= Rich Swingle =

American actor

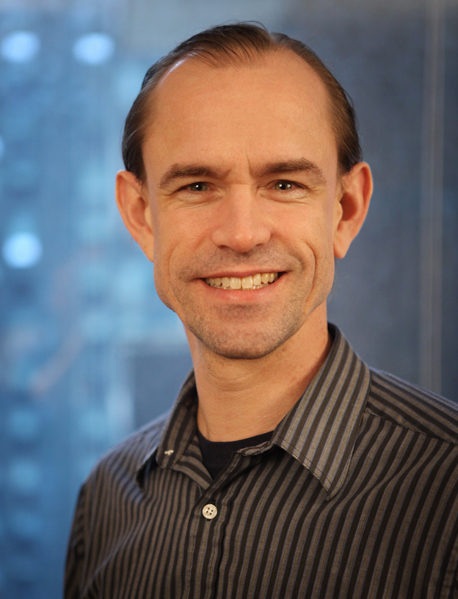
- Swingle on the set of the film Courageous Love.
- Born: May 30; Medford, Oregon, U.S.
- Occupations: Actor, director, teacher, presentation coach, producer

Rich Swingle is an American film actor, screenwriter and stage actor. He also is a Freedom Finder for Graceworks Inc. and teaches at the Rocky Mountain Christian Filmmaking Camp. After growing up on a farm in Medford, Oregon, he went on to study at George Fox University, Gordon–Conwell Theological Seminary and Hunter College, ultimately receiving a master's degree from the latter. He has appeared in numerous films, including A Christmas Snow, Indescribable, Alone yet Not Alone and Beyond the Mask, and he is well known for his one-man theatre acts.

== Biography ==
Rich Swingle was born in Medford, Oregon. His mother is a medical transcriptionist, and his father is a pilot, inventor, and retired farmer. Rich was raised on a farm that had been in the family since the 1920s. Swingle graduated from George Fox University, where "he spent many of his weekends visiting elementary schools and churches as part of the student touring drama group George Fox Players." He was named their alumnus of the year in 1999. He is an evangelical Christian and, "After years of feeling called to ministry, Rich Swingle entered Massachusetts’ Gordon–Conwell Theological Seminary, one of the country's top five evangelical seminaries," which he attended from 1991 to 1992. He received his master's degree in theatre from Hunter College, where he studied under Eric Bentley--who was a student of C. S. Lewis--Tina Howe playwriting, Patricia Sternberg (sociodrama)--a student of sociodrama's inventor, Jacob L. Moreno--and Jerome Coopersmith (screenwriting)--screenwriter An American Christmas Carol and for many episodes of the original Hawaii Five-O. He has been married to Joyce Swingle since 1998. She is currently a counselor, actor, and pastor at Westchester Chapel Church of the Nazarene in White Plains, New York.

=== Playwright and stage actor ===
Swingle has lived in New York City since 1993, where he has acted in a number of productions of both stage and film. He has performed and/or taught on six continents, in 39 nations and in hundreds of venues, mostly with a dozen one-man plays he has written or helped develop. His one man play "Beyond the Chariots" about the later life of Eric Liddell has been featured around the world and at various Olympic events. He also performed it at the Edinburgh Festival. Regarding the production and life of Eric Liddell, Swingle said, "Chariots of Fire deeply inspired me as a young man. I ran a cross-country race in China 20 years ago so that aspect of Eric's life is embedded in mine even more. I admire his deep convictions and willingness to stand behind them..." "Despite all the fame and adulation he was showered with after the Olympics and all the career opportunities that were presenting themselves at the time, Liddell chose to return to China and teach."

Swingle has performed several other one-man acts, such as "5 Bells for 9/11", a play tells the stories of three people, including firefighter Bruce Van Hine from Squad 41. "Soon after 9/11, an Indiana church asked Mr. Swingle to find a New Yorker willing to speak about his or her experiences during the tragedy. "And I realized, wait a minute, why just have one person tell their story of that day?"

=== Presentations trainer and coach ===
Since 2001 Swingle has been a Freedom Finder for Graceworks, helping presenters in a variety of fields overcome stage fright and connect with their audiences through seminars and project coaching. Swingle said, "I have seen fear visibly melt away as clients learn to connect with their listeners. It's exhilarating to see people go beyond what they thought possible!"

=== Director ===
He worked with John Kirby (acting coach on The Lion, the Witch and the Wardrobe, Déjà Vu, The Count of Monte Cristo) to co-direct Tartuffe and Our Town, during which he performed the role of the Stage Manager, and The Miracle Worker. He also directed Cyrano de Bergerac, The Jeweler's Shop, Twelve Angry Jurors, and Much Ado About Nothing, all with assistance from Patricia Mauceri and Susan Somerville Brown.

=== Teacher ===
He has performed and/or taught workshops in more 50 colleges and universities, including his alma mater, George Fox University, University of Memphis, Namseoul University in Korea, Singapore Bible College, and Asia-Pacific Nazarene Theological Seminary in the Philippines. Each spring he teaches a workshop at Princeton University. Swingle also spoke at the Ivy League Congress on Faith and Action, hosted by the Harvard University chapter of Christian Union. He has taught acting seminars and performed on the main stage at the Christian Worldview Film Festival in San Antonio, Texas.

=== Film actor ===
Since 2010 Swingle has been performed in over 30 films. He plays the lead role of Mitchell Little, which was distributed through AMC Independent starting February 12, 2016. His wife Joyce has played his fictional wife in five of those projects: Indescribable, The Unexpected Bar Mitzvah, Rather to Be Chosen, and Mayflower II, "A Matter of Perspective".

== Awards and nominations ==
Year	Title	Notes
1999	George Fox University Distinguished Alumnus of the Year Award	Youngest recipient at the time
2013	The HARK Award for Best Actor	For the role of Claud in A Christmas Snow.
2015	Aletheia Fellowship of the Arts Feature Film Awards Nominated for Best Lead Actor	For the role of Micah Maslow in The Unexpected Bar Mitzvah
2016	The Christian Film Festival Award for Best Actor	For the role of Mitchell Little in Providence
2016	The ICVM Gold Crown Winner Best Drama Under $250,000	Played the lead role of Mitchell Little in Providence
2016	The ICVM Silver Crown Winner Best Evangelistic Film	Played the lead role of Mitchell Little in Providence
2016	The ICVM Bronze Crown Winner Best Film	Played the lead role of Mitchell Little in Providence
2016	The ICVM Bronze Best Youth Film	Played the lead role of Mitchell Little in Providence
2016	The Christian Film Festival Award for Fan Favorite Best Actor	For the role of Mitchell Little in Providence
2016	The Christian Film Festival Award for Best Cast	For the role of Mitchell Little in Providence
2016	The Bare Bones International Film & Music Festival nominated for Best Ensemble Cast in a Feature Film	For the role of Mitchell Little in Providence
2016	The Bare Bones International Film & Music Festival Winner (tie) of the Bonehead Award for Best Feature Faith-Based	Played the lead role of Mitchell Little in Providence
2016	International Christian Film Festival Nominated for the Festival Award	Played the lead role of Mitchell Little in Providence
2017	International Christian Film Festival Best Lead Actor in a Short Film	For the role of Garreth in "A Matter of Perspective"
2017	International Christian Film Festival Honorable Mention for Best Short Film	Served as acting coach and played a truck driver in "One Day"
2017	Best Shorts Competition Award of Merit for a Short Film	Served as acting coach and played a truck driver in "One Day"
2017	Best Shorts Competition Award of Recognition for a Christian Short Film	Served as acting coach and played a truck driver in "One Day"
2018	International Christian Film Festival Nominated for Best Lead Actor in a Short Film	For "All God's Children"
2018	Christian Worldview Film Festival First Place for Honor Your Father Film Contest	Played lead inventor and voice of RoboDad for "RoboDad"
2018	Hollywood Divine International Film Festival Nominated for Best Comedic Performance	Played God in "All God's Children"
2018	Hollywood Divine International Film Festival Official Selection	Producer and Narrator for "Colonel Papa Cubano"
2019	International Christian Film Festival Film Festival Official Selection	Producer and Narrator for "Colonel Papa Cubano"
2019	Hollywood Divine International Film Festival Official Selection	Producer and Narrator for "Cuba Para Cristo"
2019	International Christian Film Festival Nominated for Best Lead Actor in a Short Film	For "You Should Be There"
2020	The Way of the Storyteller. Won the one week film competition	Script and casting consultant, acting coach and protagonist for "The Ledger"
2020	People's Choice: Actor of the Year nomination	International Christian Film and Music Festival
2021	People's Choice: Actor of the Year	International Christian Film and Music Festival
2021	International Christian Film Festival Nominated for Best Lead Actor in a Short Film	For "The Ledger"
2021	The Seneca Awards Nominated for Best Supporting Actor	For Camsis in The Adventum, Volume 3, by Wise King Media
2021	The Seneca Awards Nominated for Best Lead Actor	For Robert Redfern in The Unlikely Wise Man by Lamplighter Theatre
2021	The Seneca Awards Best Audio Drama	The Adventum, Volume 3 (played Camsis)
2021	Christian Family Film Festival Silver Award: Full Gospel Feature	It's a Life Worth Living (played Charles)
2022	The Seneca Awards Nominated for Best Supporting Actor	The Adventum, Volume 4 (played Camsis)
2022	The Seneca Awards Best New Show	The Titanic Waif (played two minor roles)
2022	The Seneca Awards Best Long Form Drama	Freedom: William Bradford and the American Pilgrims, Part 2 (played two minor roles)
2022	Content2022 Nominated for Best Justice - Sanctity of Life	Pray with Others Live (Joyce and Rich are on nominated program)
2022	Content2022 Nominated for Best Justice - Prayer	Pray with Others Live (Joyce and Rich are on nominated program)
2022	Content2022 Won Best Justice - Prayer	Pray with America's Leaders (Rich is on nominated program)
2022	Content2022 Nominated for Best Justice - Persecution	The Diary of Perpetua (Rich played Pudens)
2022	Content2022 Won Special Award - Martyrdom	The Diary of Perpetua (Rich played Pudens)
2022	Won Honorary Actor 2022	Great Lakes Christian Film Festival

== Bibliography ==
Year	Title	Notes
1991	The Fall	1-act based on "Les Misérables".
1992	I Come and Go at His Command	A play based on the martyrdom of Mary Dyer.
1993	A Clear Leading	The story of John Woolman, turned into a 1-man play in 1995.
1995	Big Fish Little Worm	1-man play. Monologue "Lazarus" by Sean Gaffney.
1997	Views of the Manger	A 1-man Christmas play including the monologue "Harvey Silverstein" by Mac Nelson.
1998	The Revelation	A 1-man play based on the Book of Revelation.
1999	The Acts	A 1-man play based on the Acts of the Apostles.
2001	The Fall	An adaptation of Swingle's 1-act play based on "Les Misérables" as a radio drama for Stage Shadows starring Rob Evan, reprising his Broadway role as Jean Valjean and George Merritt—of Broadway's Jekyll & Hyde (musical)—as the Bishop Welcome.
2002	Alien Immigration Training	A 1-man play.
2002	Five Bells for 9/11	A 1-man play based on interviews with those that experienced the September 11 attacks first hand.
2003	Journey to the Garden	A 1-man play based on Jesus Christ's Passion (Christianity).
2004	Beyond the Chariots	A 1-man play based on Eric Liddell.
2011	Shepherds Reflect on the 23rd Psalm	Conceived by Pastor Linda Warren, developed by Rich and Joyce Swingle for Morrison Academy in Taichung, Taiwan, and based on Psalm 23.

== Filmography ==
Year	Title	Role
1995	The Beginner's Bible: The Story of Creation	Adam and The Serpent
1995	The Beginner's Bible: The Story of Noah's Ark	Shem and Villager
1995	The Beginner's Bible: The Story of Moses	Pharaoh, Slave Master, Young Moses, Advisor to Pharaoh
1995	The Beginner's Bible: The Story of David and Goliath	Shammah, Hebrew Soldiers, Philistine Soldiers
1995	The Beginner's Bible: The Nativity	Second Shepherd, Third Wise Man, Advisor to Herod, Centurion, Villager
1995	The Beginner's Bible: The Story of Easter	Jesus, John, Villager
2010	A Christmas Snow	Claud
2011	Pawn's Move	Sheriff Hansen
2012	For the Glory	Coach Ryan
2012	Indescribable	Fredrick Lehman
2012	"Settled" (Short)	Tom
2013	Alone yet Not Alone	Speculator
2013	In His Steps	John Gray
2013	Christmas Grace	Clerk
2014	Creed of Gold	TV Reporter
2014	Confessions of a Prodigal Son	Homeless Man
2014	The Screenwriters	Forrest Woods
2014	Beyond the Mask	Dr. Bonneville
2015	Princess Cut	Nigel Livengood
2015	Polycarp	Auctioneer
2015	The Unexpected Bar Mitzvah	Micah Maslow
2015	Courageous Love	Alex Shelby, Sr.
2015	Mayflower II	Ferris Chapman
2015	Lifestone Velocity	Dr. Allister Walker
2015	The Messenger's Box	Jesus
2015	Providence	Mitchell Little
2015	Indy Christian Review (Series)	Auctioneer
2016	"A Matter of Perspective" (Short)	Garreth (lead)
2016	"One Day" (Short)	Truck Driver
2017	The King's Messengers, Episode: "Is There Really a God?" (series)	Ambassador Adam Sutherland
2017	The King's Messengers, Episode: "How Do We Talk with God?" (series)	Ambassador Adam Sutherland
2017	"Living Word" (short)	Science Teacher
2017	"All God's Children" (short)	God
2017	"RoboDad" (short)	Scientist
2018	"The Farmer and the Belle"	Belle's Manager, Conrad
2018	"There" (short)	Walter
2018	It's a Life Worth Living	Charles
2019	"Reflection" (short)	Mr. Cummings
2019	"Loneliness" (short)	Father
2019	"The Ledger" (short)	Daniel
2019	"Mine" (short)	Man
2019	Second Chances	Alan Doherety
2020	"The Whistlin' Kid: A Delantare Story"	Benson
2020	"Hope Alert"	Uncle Jarod
2020	"Thanksgiving Without"	Dad
2020	"Interrogation"	Guard
2021	Washington's Armor	Stu the Cook and voices for two French soldiers
2021	Three Days Later	Xavier
2021	The Diary of Perpetua	Pudens
2021	What's a Girl to Do? Season 1, Episodes 1, 2, 3, 4, 6, 8	Wesley
2021	Prison Letters, Episode 3	Homeless Man

=== Audio Drama / Voice Over ===
Year	Title	Role	Notes
2001	The Fall	All voices but Bishop (Broadway performer George Merritt) and Jean Valjean (Rob Evan, who played the role on Broadway)	Stage Shadows
2008	Olympic Hero in China: The Story of Eric Liddell	Narrator	Goodnews Communication International, Recorded in Hong Kong
2015	The Extraordinary Adventures of G.A. Henty: The Dragon and the Raven	Theodore the Monk opposite Brian Deacon, Olaf and Villager opposite Stephen Greif, and Ethelbert	Heirloom Audio, Recorded in London
2015	Renting to Parakletos	Jeeves Meriwether	Directed by Peter James Johnson
2017	The Giant Killer	The Giant Selfishness, Edgar	Lamplighter Theatre
2017	Escape from the Eagle's Nest	Mir Ghazan, Aabid, Captive Missionary, Faruq, and others	Lamplighter Theatre
2017	Tales of the Kingdom	Intro and Outro	Lamplighter Theatre
2017	Tales of the Resistance	Intro and Outro	Lamplighter Theatre
2017	"RoboDad" (short)	Voice of RoboDad	Light Symphony Productions
2018	The Adventum, Volume 1	Isaac and 15 other roles	Wise King Media
2019	Out of Egypt	Voice of God	Fidèle Youth Dance Company a division of Turning Pointe Dance, Colorado
2019	Airship Genesis: The Mountain Contest	Elijah	Turning Point
2020	The Adventum, Volume 3	Camsis, Advisor to Pharaoh and 7 other roles	Wise King Media
2020	Jonathan Park, Volume 15, The Defining Moment Series	Bobby and Alfred	Wise King Media
2020	Father Brown: The Invisible Man	James Welkin	St. Benedict Radio Theater
2020	Freedom: William Bradford and the American Pilgrims, Part 1	Charles Deane and Richard Clyfton	Beachglass Ministries
2021	I, Daniel	Daniel	Evergreen Media Productions
2021	The Adventum, Volume 4	Camsis, Advisor to Pharaoh	Wise King Media
2021	Freedom: William Bradford and the American Pilgrims, Part 2	Samoset and an unnamed Native American	Beachglass Ministries
2021	The Titanic Waif	Luc and Murdoch	Legacy Radio Theatre
2021	The Adventum, Volume 5	El Jib, Karima, Ohad and Pino	Wise King Media
2021	Jonathan Park, Volume 18, The One True God	Jacob Ben Dod and Bapary Babu	Wise King Media
2022	The Crown of Success	Mr. Alphabet	Lamplighter Theatre
2022	Famous Last Words, Episode 2	Doctor, German, Isaac Newton, Jailer	Light Symphony Productions
2022	Brinkman Adventures: She Is Mine	Butcher and Grandfather	Beachglass Ministries
2022	Emmanuel	Priest	Kris Komedies
2022	My Father's World	Marcus Weber and Rev. Rutledge	Wings Arising Productions
2022	Jonathan Park, Volume 20, Sound the Alarm	General Howe and a Sergeant	Wise King Media
2023	Star Spangled Adventures, Episode 10, "America on the World Stage"	Sidekicks for William Randolf Hearst and Teddy Roosevelt	Little Patriots Learning
2024	Serpent from the Beginning	Jesus	HeartMatters
2025	Famous Last Words, Episode 4	John Milton and Leo Tolstoy	Light Symphony Productions

=== Video Game ===
Year	Title	Role	Notes
2019	Airship Genesis	John the Baptist	Turning Point. Performance is on Level 11
