= Christmas Grace =

- Teaser poster
- Directed by: Keith Perna
- Written by: Keith Perna
- Produced by: Keith Perna; Daniel Knudsen
- Starring: RyanIver Klann; Tim Kaiser; Christy Storey; Rebekah Cook; Rich Swingle
- Cinematography: Timothy Jones
- Edited by: David Peterson
- Music by: Samuel Joshua
- Production companies: Bright Horizon Pictures; Crystal Creek Media
- Release date: October 7, 2014
- Running time: 84 minutes
- Country: United States
- Language: English

Christmas Grace is a Christmas-related film about two competing toy stores. It was produced by Bright Horizon Pictures and Crystal Creek Media, the latter of which created films such as Creed of Gold and Courageous Love. Filming of Christmas Grace took place around several locations in Southeastern Michigan in early 2012. The film was released on October 7, 2014.

== Plot ==
Christmas Grace tells the story of two rival toy store owners competing for business over several Christmas seasons. One of them is Gary (RyanIver Klann), a young toy store owner who runs an honest business and tries to maintain a good reputation with his customers. Things are running smoothly for Gary until his business is threatened when a much larger toy company moves to the neighborhood. The owner of this larger company, Mr. Tollman (Tim Kaiser), is a ruthless businessman who voraciously wants to grow his business and eliminate competition. Since his most immediate competition is Gary's store, he sets his target on him. As the story unfolds, it becomes evident that God is at work in the lives of these two men, and God's grace and providence work out in ways neither of them could have imagined.

== Cast ==
- RyanIver Klann as Gary
- Tim Kaiser as Jim Tollman
- Rebekah Cook as Tollman's secretary, Michelle

Christy Storey and Rich Swingle also appear in the film.

== Production ==
Principal photography began February 28, 2012, and ended March 17, 2012. Various locations throughout Southeastern Michigan were used for filming, including toy stores in Berkley and Grosse Pointe.

The interior of the Doll Hospital and Toy Soldier Shop in Berkley was used in the film, appearing as a big, corporate toy store, but the exterior of the fictional toy store is actually an Ace Hardware store. The store in Grosse Pointe is portrayed as a small, independent store; filming took place when the store was closed at night. A credit union in Highland Charter Township was used in the film. Its employees were cast as extras.

A teaser trailer was released by Crystal Creek Media on March 24, 2012, and a full trailer was unveiled on July 27, 2012.

== Release ==
Christmas Grace premiered December 5, 2013, to a nearly sold out auditorium in Royal Oak, Michigan, and was released on DVD October 7, 2014.

== Awards ==
Christmas Grace won a Stellae Award for best "4 to 14" film at the 6th annual Pan Pacific Film Festival in Los Angeles. The film was also a finalist for "Best Feature Film" in the 2014 Christian Worldview Film Festival.
