= Dinosaur Cove (film) =

- Promotional film poster
- Directed by: Daniel Knudsen
- Written by: Derrick Steele
- Produced by: Mark A. Knudsen; Michelle Knudsen
- Starring: Brayden Eaton; Jared Withrow; Holly Houk; James Pilachowski
- Music by: Sean Anthony Kisch
- Production company: Crystal Creek Media
- Distributed by: Crystal Creek Media
- Release date: June 1, 2022
- Running time: 96 minutes
- Country: United States
- Language: English

Dinosaur Cove is a 2022 family adventure film about a boy who discovers dinosaur eggs and must protect them from a crazy scientist. It was written by Derrick Steele and directed by Daniel Knudsen. The movie was produced and distributed by Crystal Creek Media.

== Plot ==
Riley Harrison is a young boy who stumbled across the unlikely discovery of dinosaur eggs near his grandfather’s oceanfront home. The eggs were laid by a pterodactyl that escaped from a secret genetics and animal cloning laboratory. A crazy scientist, who mistakenly released the dinosaur, must retrieve the specimen and the eggs that she has laid. He plans on using the animals as living targets for an exotic hunting preserve. Riley must protect the animals from the crazy scientist and look after the dinosaurs.

== Cast ==
- Brayden Eaton as Riley Harrison
- Jared Withrow as Wyatt Harrison
- Holly Houk as Dr. Theresa Starr
- James Pilachowski as Dr. Victor Vandersaurian
- Emily Buckner as Izzy Luther
- Addilyn Houk as Savannah Reeves
- Regan Miller as Mark Allen
- Cameron McCormick as Agent Russell
- Ray Morgis as Duke Harrison
- Daniel Knudsen as Dr. Terrance Walker

== Production ==
Young social media sensation Brayden Eaton was cast in the lead role of Riley Harrison. The film was directed by Daniel Knudsen who previously directed Courageous Love and ‘’SKYDOG’’. Dinosaur Cove wrapped up post-production in early 2022.

== Release ==
A trailer for ’’Dinosaur Cove’’ was released on January 28, 2022. The movie was released on June 1, 2022, after some limited theatrical and targeted promotional screenings. The Dove seal of family approval was awarded to Dinosaur Cove by the Dove Foundation.
