= Ultimatum (disambiguation) =

An Ultimatum is a demand whose fulfillment is backed up by a threat.

Ultimatum may also refer to:

== Comics ==
- Ultimatum (comics), a 2008 Marvel Comics crossover event within the Ultimate Marvel imprint
- ULTIMATUM, a fictional terrorist organization in Marvel Comics
- Ultimatum, an alternative version of Marvel Comics character Miles Morales
- Ultimatum, an Image Comics character member of Vicious Circle

== Music ==
- Ultimatum (EP), a 2005 EP by The Long Winters
- Ultimatum (Nightstick album)
- Ultimatum (Australian band), an Australian hardcore band
- Ultimatum (American band), an American heavy metal band
- "Ultimatum", a song by Shaggy from his 2005 album Clothes Drop
- "Ultimatum", a song by Ten Foot Pole
- "Ultimatum", an album by music composer Jesper Kyd for Motion Picture Advertising
- "Ultimatum", a song by Disclosure featuring Fatoumata Diawara

== Film and television ==
- Ultimatum (game show), a Quebec quiz show
- The Bourne Ultimatum (film), a 2007 film starring Matt Damon as Jason Bourne
- "Ultimatum", an episode of the animated series Justice League Unlimited
- "Ultimatum" (The Office), an episode of The Office
- The Ultimatum, a Singaporean Chinese TV drama
- The Ultimatum, a dating reality television show on Netflix
- Eternal Theater, a 2010 film formerly titled Ultimatum
- Ultimatum (1938 film), a 1938 film directed by Robert Wiene
- Ultimatum (1973 film), a Canadian drama film directed by Jean Pierre Lefebvre
- Ultimatum (1984 film), a 1984 film directed by Janusz Kidawa, featuring the 1982 seizure of the Polish embassy in Bern
- Ultimatum (1994 film), a 1994 film directed by Cirio H. Santiago
- Ultimatum (2001 film), a 2001 film directed by Yuen Wah
- Ultimatum (2009 film), a 2009 film directed by Alain Tasma
- "Ultimatum", the forty-first episode of Code Lyoko
- "The Ultimatum", the thirty-seventh episode of Avatar: The Legend of Korra

== Other ==
- Ultimatum game, an experimental economics game in which two parties interact anonymously and only once, so reciprocation is not an issue
- Ultimatum, a 1973 novel by Richard Rohmer
- Ultimatum (book), a 2009 book by Matthew Glass
- HMS Ultimatum (P34), a Royal Navy U-class submarine
