= Christmas Coupon =

- Promotional film poster
- Directed by: Daniel Knudsen
- Written by: Daniel Knudsen
- Produced by: Mark A. Knudsen; Michelle Knudsen; Tel K. Ganesan; G.B. Thimotheose
- Starring: Courtney Mathews; Aaron Noble; Nepoleon Duraisamy; Sheena Monnin; Robert Laenen; Daniel Knudsen; Drew Jacobs; Tim Kaiser
- Music by: Sean Anthony Kisch
- Production company: Crystal Creek Media
- Distributed by: Crystal Creek Media; Kyyba Films
- Release date: December 2, 2019
- Running time: 93 minutes
- Country: United States
- Language: English

Christmas Coupon is a 2019 American romantic holiday film written and directed by Daniel Knudsen. Produced by Crystal Creek Media, the film's plot follows a figure skater who falls in love with a hockey player.

== Plot ==
The movie follows Alison Grant who is a former figure skating champion. She is now teaching ice skating lessons to children at a local rink. However, her boss cancels her classes for not bringing in enough students. After being let go by the rink, Alison starts out on her own by teaching skating lessons on a friend’s pond. Alison and her nieces hand out Christmas coupons for the new class to bring in students. One of the girls who joins brings her uncle Ivan to class with her. Ivan was Alison’s old high school sweetheart who left her years before when he received an offer to play major league hockey. Initially the two are at odds with each other, but after the cold reunion passes they start to become friends again. Eventually they rekindle their relationship and fall in love.

== Cast ==
- Courtney Mathews as Alison Grant
- Aaron Noble as Ivan Hall
- Nepoleon Duraisamy as Agent Kumar
- Sheena Monnin as Lauren Holmes
- Robert Laenen as Bobby
- Daniel Knudsen as Chris McGill
- Drew Jacobs as Drew Williams
- Tim Kaiser as Nicholas Hodge
- Justin Mane as Thomas Holmes
- Tenley as Chloe Williams

Producer, Tel K. Ganesan, uncredited, appears as a man talking with Agent Kumar at the beginning of the film.

== Production ==
Courtney Mathews and Aaron Noble star in the lead roles. Mathews plays former figure skating champion Alison Grant and Noble plays the hockey player Ivan Hall. Former Miss Pennsylvania Sheena Monnin co-stars in Christmas Coupon. It is the second American film that Indian actor Napoleon was a part of. Napoleon plays Ivan Hall’s major league sports agent in the film. Christmas Coupon includes a performance of “It’s Christmas Time Again” by Broadway singer Tom Rhoads. It also includes additional original soundtrack songs performed by Drew Jacobs and Yasmeen Suri.

Principal photography for Christmas Coupon took place around the holiday season in 2018. Various locations near Detroit, Michigan were used for filming such as Farmington Hills, Northville and Lake Orion.

== Release ==
Christmas Coupon is being distributed by Kyyba Films in India and East Asia and Crystal Creek Media in all other territories. A trailer launch event was held on June 29, 2019 in Chennai, India. The Dove seal of family approval was awarded to Christmas Coupon by the Dove Foundation. The movie was released on December 2, 2019 following a sold out premiere event near Detroit, Michigan.
