= Building a Difference =

- Created by: Mick Richards
- Starring: Chris Simons
- Country of origin: United States
- No. of seasons: 3

Production
- Producer: DeepLight Entertainment
- Running time: 30 minutes

Original release
- Release: 2009

Building A Difference is a documentary television program that showcases volunteers, organizations and charities that help "build a difference" in the lives of people in desperate need. It is a production of DeerLight Entertainment of Jacksonville, Florida. Its first season host and producer is Chris Simons and the executive producer and director Mick Richards. Volume One features Northeast Florida Builders Care and was produced in association with the Northeast Florida Builders Association of Jacksonville and airs on TBN and various television stations across the country.

== History ==
Building A Difference debuted on television in 2009 as a documentary series that showcases the crew and other people, organizations and volunteers giving their time, services and efforts to help build, rebuild, reconstruct or remodel homes of deserving families who are in desperate need. It currently features many families as well as those involved with making these dreams come true. Only three seasons have been filmed so far as of 2011.

== Accreditations and awards ==
Building A Difference received the Seal of Approval from the Parents Television Council for the episode "Page-Bailie Bunch".

== Reception ==
The Dove Foundation gave the documentary a positive review, writing, "This is a wonderful inspiring documentary about a group of fantastic people and volunteers who help to make a change in one family's life. ... This is truly an amazing story of encouragement and it will encourage others to help those in need."
