= The King's Messengers =

US television program

- Genre: Teen drama Supernatural; Action
- Created by: Daniel Knudsen; Kristina Kaylen
- Starring: Christopher Veldhuizen; Daniel Knudsen; Anne Lampert; Kristina Kaylen; Damion Stevenson; Mike Tremblay
- Composer: Sean Anthony Kisch
- Country of origin: United States
- Original language: English
- No. of seasons: 1
- No. of episodes: 8

Production
- Executive producers: Mark A. Knudsen; Michelle Knudsen; Kristina Kaylen
- Production location: Detroit, Michigan
- Running time: 24 minutes
- Production company: Crystal Creek Media

Original release
- Release: June 24, 2017 – present

The King's Messengers is an American teen drama mini-series produced by Crystal Creek Media that will premiere on the PureFlix platform. It centers on Anwaar Osem (Christopher Veldhuizen) and David Sutherland (Daniel Knudsen), two refugees trying to survive in the fictional war-torn country of Zanora. The series was awarded a Dove seal of family approval from the Dove Foundation.

== Plot ==
Anwaar's parents were killed during an air raid led by forces fighting for political control of Zanora. He flees to the northern forest to escape a corrupt regime as well as the dangerous Resistance Army. While hiding out and surviving in the woods he meets David Sutherland, a fellow refugee who is also trying to escape the Resistance Army. Anwaar questions David on a computer that David has, however David will not reveal any information to Anwaar. After a close call with a Resistance soldier, David reveals that his brother Allen gave him the computer and it has something important on it. David himself does not know what the computer contains as it was entrusted to him while he narrowly escaped during a raid on the British consulate by the Resistance Army. Anwaar convinces David to do a webcast with the computer and eventually the two become friends.

== Cast and characters ==
=== Main ===
- Christopher Veldhuizen as Anwaar Osem, the son of a pastor who was recently killed by members of the Resistance Army. Anwaar serves as the inspiration for David to create the messenger message videos where they webcast segments about faith.
- Daniel Knudsen as David Sutherland is the son of the British Royal Ambassador to Zanora. Ambassador Adam Sutherland was recently killed by members of the Resistance Army fighting for political control of Zanora.
- Anne Lampert as Nema Rownan, an Office of Foreign Peace affairs director at the Alliance of Nations.
- Kristina Kaylen as Alexa Corwin, a peacekeeping correspondent for the Alliance of Nations.
- Damion Stevenson as Dmitri, a sharp I.T. professional working for the Alliance of Nations.
- Mike Tremblay as General Riven, the main antagonist in the show leading the Resistance Army.

=== Recurring ===
- Jonathan DeRoos as Braiser, a Resistance Army soldier.
- Greg Tull as Allen Sutherland, brother of David.
- Rich Swingle as British Ambassador Adam Sutherland.
- Rusty Martin Jr. from Courageous makes a cameo appearance as network news anchor.

== Episodes ==
No. overall	No. in season	Title	Directed by	Written by	Original release date
1	1	"Is there really a God?"	Kristina Kaylen	Daniel Knudsen; Kristina Kaylen	June 24, 2017
Anwaar leaves his hometown in Zanora and escapes to the northern forest. While hiding in the forest he meets David Sutherland.
2	2	"Who is God?"	Joshua Knudsen	Damion Stevenson	June 24, 2017
Anwaar and David work together to find food. A stranger named Cogan leads them to a food trap set by the Resistance Army.
3	3	"How do we walk with God?"	Joshua Knudsen	Damion Stevenson	June 24, 2017
Anwaar suggests they scope out a Resistance Army outpost to search for food. The operation goes south when they are seen and David is caught by the Resistance Army.
4	4	"Does God love us?"	Joshua Knudsen	Damion Stevenson	June 24, 2017
The Resistance Army general demands ransom money from the Alliance of Nations for the release of David Sutherland. When ransom demands are not met, he decides that David will be executed. Before David is executed, Anwaar rescues him from the Resistance Army outpost.
5	5	"Who are we in Christ?"	Joshua Knudsen	Damion Stevenson	March 1, 2019
David and Anwaar happen upon some fellow refugees who have a bible belonging to Allen Sutherland. Though this discovery excites David, Anwaar disagrees that it is something they should further pursue. Unable to come to a compromise, David sets out on his own to see if he can find his brother Allen.
6	6	"Why are we here?"	Joshua Knudsen	Damion Stevenson	March 1, 2019
Anwaar is upset to learn that David has left. In the meantime, the Resistance Army is closing in on them. An unfortunate encounter with a Resistance soldier leaves David grazed with a bullet wound. Anwaar rescues him and helps him back to camp.
7	7	"How do we fight the good fight?"	Joshua Knudsen	Damion Stevenson	March 1, 2019
Dmitri from the Alliance of Nations begins to catch on to what is happening in Zenora. With some recovered files Alexa had given him, he pieces together what is on Sutherland’s laptop. Alexa and Dmitri team up to get Anwaar and David out of Zenora.
8	8	"How do we share God’s love?"	Joshua Knudsen	Damion Stevenson	March 1, 2019
Anwaar and David receive coordinates to a Zenorian military base as they finish a webcast. While they are not sure if this message is from the Alliance of Nations or it is a trap, they decide to pursue it. Along the way they discover that the country has been further destroyed by the Resistance Army. Eventually they make it to the military base and are airlifted to safety. However, Anwaar suffered a gunshot wound in the knee leaving him unable to walk. While safely out of Zenora and receiving medical attention in a hospital, David tells Anwaar that he must get well soon because the work in Zenora is not yet finished.

== Production ==
Principal photography for The King’s Messengers took place during the summer of 2016. Most of the show was filmed on location near Detroit, Michigan with additional photography taking place in New York City. Crystal Creek Media released a trailer for the series on June 19, 2017.

== Reception ==
The first four episodes premiered as a film at the 2017 Christian Worldview Film Festival. The mini-series also received a five-Dove review rating from the Dove Foundation.
