= Eternal Theater =

- Directed by: Daniel Knudsen
- Written by: Daniel Knudsen
- Produced by: Daniel Knudsen; George W. Sarris
- Starring: Daniel Knudsen; Peter Hiett; George W. Sarris; David Konstan; David Bentley Hart; Ilaria Ramelli; Robin Parry
- Cinematography: Steve Schriemer
- Music by: Christian Le Doux
- Production company: Streetsteeple
- Distributed by: Streetsteeple
- Release date: March 1, 2024
- Running time: 90 minutes
- Country: United States
- Language: English

Eternal Theater is a 2024 American religious documentary film by filmmaker Daniel Knudsen about Christian universalism. The film follows Knudsen's journey exploring the traditional Christian teaching on hell contrasted with Universal reconciliation. The film began production in 2010 and was released during Easter 2024.

== Plot ==
The overall theme of Eternal Theater is that the narrative patterns that are most meaningful to humans celebrate the idea of ultimate redemption.

The movie begins with a discussion on narrative exploration as to why stories are meaningful to human beings. Then the film transitions to several soundbites from individuals such as agnostic Bill Nye to various Christian leaders including Tony Campolo and Rick Warren addressing thematic questions. The documentary then follows Knudsen in his early career as he began directing movies and working alongside the powerful in the religious leadership community. He recounts inconsistencies with the messages coming from the church and the teachings of Jesus. The journey led him to explore the meaning of the Biblical texts and teachings of the early Christian church about the afterlife. Knudsen points out that a closer look at the Bible reveals that the common teaching of eternal conscious torment is not consistent within the text and is also not consistent with the restoration theme that pervades scripture. He also sites quotes from many early church fathers who taught that God's ultimate plan for redemption includes all people.

The documentary features a number of well recognized Bible scholars including David Konstan, David Bentley Hart, Ilaria Ramelli and Robin Parry. The film project also features interviews with Pastor Peter Hiett and George W. Sarris. The film's basic premise is that the narrative patterns that transcend history have definable characteristics and those characteristics point towards ultimate hope.

== Production ==
Knudsen stated that he began production on the documentary in 2010, though it took him more than a decade to finish the film. The movie uses a large theater as a motif to make the comparison that God is using all of creation to tell a story. Parts of the movie were filmed in Knudsen's hometown of Dearborn and Detroit, Michigan. Filming for the documentary also took place at significant religious landmarks in the United States, Israel, Europe and the Middle East. Eternal Theater is a continuation of the “hope never dies” theme popular in a number of his movies.

== Release ==
The Dove seal of family approval was awarded to Eternal Theater by the Dove Foundation. The movie was released during the 2024 Easter season.
