= A Long Way Off =

- Film poster
- Directed by: Michael Davis; John Errington
- Written by: Jon Macy Gerald; McGlothlin
- Produced by: Michael Davis; Dianne L. Haskett; Byron M. Jones; Christy McGlothlin; Gerald McGlothlin; Andreas Wilcken Jr.
- Starring: Robert Davi; Edie McClurg; John Diehl; Jason Burkey; Dave Blamy; Zoe Myers; Johanna Jowett
- Cinematography: John Errington
- Edited by: Blake Godfrey
- Music by: Craig Brandwynne
- Production companies: Mountain Top Entertainment; Prodigafilm; Uptone Pictures
- Distributed by: CMD Distribution
- Release date: May 6, 2014
- Running time: 100 minutes
- Country: United States
- Language: English

A Long Way Off is a 2014 Christian drama film starring Robert Davi, Edie McClurg, John Diehl and Jason Burkey. The film was released on June 6, 2014, by CMD Distribution. The film is a modern retelling of The Prodigal Son Parable.

== Plot ==
In this modern day retelling of the timeless Prodigal Son Parable, young Jacob is tired of living on the family farm, submitting to the rules of his Father, Mr. Abraham. One day he demands an early inheritance from his father, who shocks his young son by agreeing to give it to him. So, he heads to the big city doing things his way without restraint, and for a while he does well-surprisingly well. He takes huge business risks and converts his small fortune into a big fortune, despite his extremely flamboyant lifestyle that attracts the wrong women, including seductive Laura, whose rich boyfriend Frank is often dangerously nearby. Jake had it all: money, ladies, prestige-but then-he loses it all and just when he thinks he's hit bottom the bottom drops some more- until he is eating out of dumpsters and eventually ends up living in a literal pig pen. Coming to his senses he heads home, determined to work in an entry-level position for his dad, who surprises him once again by running to him-but is it to kiss him or kill him?

== Music ==
The score soundtrack, music supervision and audio production to A Long Way Off was produced by Emmy nominated musician/arranger/producer Craig Brandwynne at Center Sound Productions in Raleigh, North Carolina. Center Sound Productions is notable for working on a number of independent films including Destiny Road, Don't Pass Me By, and Changeover.

== Reception ==
The Dove Foundation said "We are happy to award this movie our Dove "Family-Approved" Seal for ages twelve plus due to several drinking scenes. Here is a Biblical story for modern audiences."
