= Crystal Creek Media =

- Genre: Family
- Founded: 2005
- Headquarters: United States
- Key people: Mark Knudsen; Michelle Knudsen; Daniel Knudsen; Kristina Kaylen
- Products: Films
- Website: www.crystalcreekmedia.com

Crystal Creek Media is an independent film production company that specializes in faith-based and family films, founded in 2005. After producing several short films and promotional videos, the company began to venture into full-length films, releasing films such as Creed of Gold and Courageous Love.

The company also runs a film making training program for high school students and a regional film making networking event.

== History ==
Founded in 2005, Crystal Creek Media quickly began producing short films and promotional videos. After completing production for several short films and commercial projects, such as a promotional for the Titan Century 5000 disaster relief unit (marketed to the United States Department of Homeland Security), plans were begun for a feature film. With investors attracted and story concept approved, a script was soon in the making. Since then the company has done a number of feature films in the family and faith-based genre.

=== Film festivals ===
Crystal Creek's film Creed of Gold was shown at several film festivals and was nominated for an Adam Award for Best Feature Drama at the Sabaoth International Film Festival in Milan, Italy. Creed of Gold was also featured in the H2F2 Film Festival and won a Redemptive Storyteller Award at the Redemptive Film Festival.

Christmas Grace won a Stellae Award for Best "4 to 14" film at the 6th annual Pan Pacific Film Festival in Los Angeles.

Courageous Love won the Audience Choice Award for Best Independent Feature at the 2017 Winnipeg Film Festival.

== Lawsuit ==
Crystal Creek Media launched a lawsuit against Christian film company CMD Distribution for failing to fulfill its contractual financial obligations over the distribution of the movie Creed of Gold. In early 2017 Crystal Creek was awarded a judgment against CMD by the Superior Court of New Hanover County in the state of North Carolina.

== Filmography ==
Title	Release date	Director	Notes
Indescribable	2013	Stacie Graber	
Unexpected Places	2013	Michael Brennan	
Creed of Gold	2014	Daniel Knudsen	
Christmas Grace	2014	Keith Perna	
A Horse Called Bear	2015	Daniel Knudsen	
Courageous Love	2017	Daniel Knudsen	
The King's Messengers	2017	Kristina Kaylen & Joshua Knudsen	
Christmas Coupon	2019	Daniel Knudsen	
SKYDOG	2020	Daniel Knudsen & Tim Kaiser	
Dinosaur Cove (film)	2022	Daniel Knudsen	

== Film Camp ==
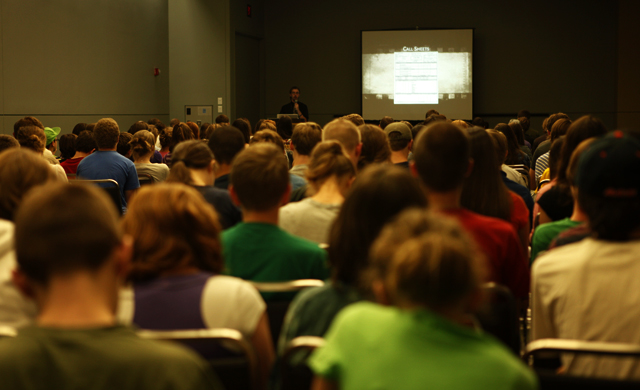
Photo from the Film Camp held in Richmond, Virginia.

Crystal Creek Media's Film Camp is a national tour designed to train young Christian artists in the discipline of filmmaking. Film Camp events have been held in Rochester, New York; Manchester, Missouri; Pasadena, California; Duluth, Georgia; Kissimmee, Florida; Oconomowoc, Wisconsin; Richmond, Virginia; Phoenix, Arizona; College Station, Texas; and Montgomery, Alabama. In addition to the live events, Film Camp also has a one semester curriculum on DVD.
