= Indescribable (film) =

- Directed by: Stacie Graber
- Written by: Joseph Graber
- Produced by: Joseph J. Graber; Daniel Knudsen
- Starring: Seth Pruski; Rich Swingle; Jason Cockerham; Danielle Duncan
- Cinematography: Timothy Jones; Ethan Ledden
- Music by: David W. Hamilton
- Production companies: Thorncrown Project; Crystal Creek Media
- Release date: April 6, 2013
- Country: United States
- Language: English

Indescribable is a 2013 film produced by Thorncrown Project in association with Crystal Creek Media, which produced films such as Creed of Gold and Courageous Love. Filming took place during June and July 2011 in Bryan, Texas. The story is based on the historical events surrounding the writing of the hymn "The Love of God". It was released to home video on April 6, 2013.

== Plot ==
Blynn Lehman, one of nine children in a family in Pasadena, California during 1917 is facing many changes. His older brother announces that he's received a draft notice from the U.S. Army. His father informs the family that they are all going to need to reduce spending to make it through their present financial struggles. As Blynn watches his older siblings begin working and saving, he decides to lead the younger kids in an attempt to help the family survive.

Blynn overhears a conversation that leads him to believe that composing a hit song could make much money. His father has already begun writing a song about the love of God, so Blynn and his siblings try to help their father finish it. Their failed attempts to compose more of the song cause Blynn to realize he doesn't understand what it means to love God. Blynn stumbles across the perfect verse to finish the song, which begins a search for the author of that verse. He eventually learns that an ancient Jewish Rabbi living in Germany during the First Crusade composed the verse that they are using to complete their father's song.

When the family receives news that their oldest brother has died in World War I, Blynn's struggle to understand God's love comes to a climax. Ultimately, he learns what it means to love God and others.

== Cast ==
- Seth Pruski as Blynn
- Rich Swingle as Papa Lehman
- Jason Cockerham as Walter
- Danielle Duncan as Fern
- Susannah Ely as Wilma
- Andrew Cook as Donald
- Rebekah Cook as Claudia
- Garry Nation as Rabbi Ben Isaac
- Joyce Swingle as Mamma Lehman

== Production ==
Indescribable was filmed during June and July 2011 in Bryan, Texas. The 25-day shoot involved 44 speaking roles, a crew of 49 and as many as 60 extras throughout the production. Joseph and Stacie Graber, husband and wife, wrote the screenplay. Indescribable included the vocals of gospel music singer Guy Penrod, who sings "The Love of God" in the film.

== Release ==
Indescribable was released to DVD in the United States on April 6, 2013.

=== Awards ===
2013 San Antonio Independent Christian Film Festival

- Finalist—Best Feature Film
- Runner-up—Best Music Score
