= List of fictional presidents of the United States (A–B) =

Lists of fictional presidents of the United States
A–B	C–D	E–F
G–H	I–J	K–M
N–R	S–T	U–Z
Fictional presidencies of historical figures
A–B	C–D	E–G
H–J	K–L	M–O
P–R	S–U	V–Z

The following is a list of fictional presidents of the United States, A through B.

== A ==
=== President Neil Anami ===
- President in: We Can Be Heroes (2020)
- Played by: Christopher McDonald
- Secretly an alien (name spelled backwards reads "I'm an alien")
- Part of an operation by the aliens to stage an invasion of Earth which captures the planet's superheroes in order to train their children to be new Heroics. Ultimately gets discovered and revealed to be subordinate to Ojo, a superpowered child also secretly the alien Supreme Commander.

=== President Truman Abbott ===
- President in: The Vegas Legacy by Ovid Demaris (1983).
- Runs for a second term when arriving in Las Vegas for his party's convention.
- Is challenged for re-nomination by former governor Hamilton Foote.
- Cuts a deal with mobsters to take on corrupt Nevada senator Randolph Godwin as a running mate.

=== President William Abbott ===
- President in: Advise and Consent
- Speaker of the House and a Representative from Colorado.
- Succeeds to presidency upon assassination of President Harley Hudson.
- Declines to run for reelection, which leads to the election contest between Orrin Knox (The Promise of Joy) and Edward M. Jason (Come Nineveh, Come Tyre).

=== President George Abnego ===
- President in: "Null-P" by William Tenn (1947 short story).
- Elected for being an average guy, and serves numerous terms with no solid opposition after his second election.
- His direct descendants continue to be elected as US presidents, then as Presidents of the World in later generations.

=== President Howard T. Ackerman ===
- President in: Command & Conquer: Red Alert 3
- President in an alternate history where the United States faces both the Soviet Union and Japanese Empire in a futuristic World War.
- Played by: J. K. Simmons

=== President John Ackerman ===
- President in: Indigo Prophecy/Fahrenheit
- Mentioned in in-game news reports.

=== President Alan Adams ===
- President in: Shadowrun
- Serves from 2049 to 2053
- Party: Democratic
- Defeats incumbent Carl Preston in the 2048 election
- 4th UCAS President and 50th US President
- President throughout the First Edition of the Shadowrun RPG
- Is succeeded by VP Thomas Steel (D) in 2053 after Adams dies the day after his second inauguration.

=== President Barbara Jacqueline Adams ===
- President in: Whoops Apocalypse
- Played by: Loretta Swit
- Succeeds to presidency upon death of the previous president. Her incompetence helps cause World War Three.
- Husband owns a weapons company that deliberately instigates World War Three to sell arms.

=== President David Jefferson Adams ===
- President in: Shattered Union
- Most unpopular President in US history, he is declared the winner of the 2008 election by Congress after a tie vote
- His administration sees increased domestic terrorism in 2010, resulting in the declaration of martial law in California in 2011
- A sham election, perpetrated by the United States Supreme Court disqualifying several more popular candidates, results in his "reelection" in 2012.
- Is killed, along with most of the federal government, when a nuclear bomb is detonated in Washington, D. C. during the inauguration on January 20, 2013.
- His death directly leads to the fragmentation of the United States and the start of the Second American Civil War.

=== President John Fitzgerald "Jack" Adams ===
- President in: Lucky Bastard by Charles McCarry (1992 novel)
- Born in 1944.
- Believes himself to be the illegitimate son of John F. Kennedy and is recruited by the KGB in college.

=== President Joshua T. Adams ===
- President in: Independence Day: Resurgence
- Investigates a crashed intact alien spacecraft in the ocean on July 5, 1996
- Commanding general of Earth Space Defense
- Sworn in as (presumably acting) president after his predecessor Elizabeth Lanford was killed by aliens along with the entirety of the United States presidential line of succession at Cheyenne Mountain Complex in 2016
- Has a wife named Janine
- Played by: William Fichtner

=== President John Quincy Adding Machine ===
- President in: Futurama, mentioned in A Head in the Polls.
- The first robot President of Earth (a position that evolved from that of President of the United States).
- As the President of Earth is directly elected, he is elected by just one vote.
- He promised not to go on a killing spree, which was a promise he was unable to keep.
- He was elected in part because of the enfranchisement of robots (with Bender being prohibited for being a convicted felon).

=== President Adler ===
- President in: Jack & Bobby
- Controversial president during the War of the Americas. Adler is criticized as a war criminal for his handling of the war and is subsequently arrested by the president of Finland during Robert McCallister's administration and charged with war crimes.

=== President P.J. Aimes ===
- President in: The Summit (TV mini-series, 2008)
- Conservative who attends a summit in Canada discussing an international tax and an anti-terrorism measure during his last year in office.
- Is willing to support the tax in exchange for support on the anti-terrorism measure, but withdraws his support when terrorists demand the tax be passed.
- Serves two terms.
- Party: Republican.
- Played by Christopher Plummer

=== President James "Jimmy" Alderdice ===
- President in: E Pluribus Bang by David Lippincott (1970 novel).
- Former governor of California, Alderdice's campaign slogan is "Law and Order, and Like it!"
- Refuses medical treatment (as a Christian Scientist) for a cold he catches while being sworn into office, and dies five days later.
- Succeeded by Vice President George Ramsey Kirk.

=== President David Alexander ===
- President in: Megiddo: The Omega Code 2
- Vice president before becoming president after the mysterious death of his predecessor. He is thrown out of office for not complying with his brother's New World order.
- Played by: Michael Biehn

=== President Josh Alexander ===
- President in: Act of Treason and Protect and Defend by Vince Flynn
- Party: Democratic
- Governor of Georgia
- Married to Jillian Rautbort Alexander
- Running mate is Mark Ross, three-term senator from Connecticut and hawkish Director of National Intelligence
- Ross is killed the day of the inauguration by CIA Director Irene Kennedy without the knowledge of Alexander. Alexander believes he died of a heart attack.
- Threatens war with Iran and US after Irene Kennedy is kidnapped and Iran sinks one of their own submarines, blaming it on the US.
- Along with Chief of Staff Byrne, Alexander uses football analogies to describe his policies.

=== President Mackenzie Allen ===
- President in: Commander in Chief
- Allen, the vice president under President Theodore Roosevelt "Teddy" Bridges, becomes the first female president in history after his death. She is married and has three children. Prior to becoming president, Allen was a prosecutor and congresswoman from Connecticut.
- When the dying Bridges and the Republican Party leadership requests her resignation in favor of a "more appropriate" leader, she refuses.
- Privately states that her main political enemy is Speaker of the House Nathan Templeton.
- Played by: Geena Davis
- Party: Independent, formerly a moderate Republican

=== President Kathy Alton ===
- President in: The Illuminati by Larry Burkett
- Widow of Mars expedition commander Colonel Lee Alton. Dies in office by electrocution from a hairdryer in her bathtub.
- Party: Democratic

=== President Dante Alvarado ===
- President in The Mandibles
- Born in Oaxaca, Mexico, and is elected in 2028.
- Elected after the Constitution is amended to permit foreign-born persons to become president.
- Renounces the national debt in the Great Renunciation, which leads to a decade-long depression.
- Party: Democratic

=== President Alvarez ===
- President in: Shooter (season 3)
- First Hispanic president.
- Previously served in the United States Marine Corps and received training at Parris Island.
- Becomes aware of a secretive cabal called Atlas operating within his government, led by Undersecretary of Agriculture Red Bama Sr. The group murders his Chief of Staff Andrew Gold, framing it to appear as a drunk driving crash.
- He is pressured into nominating Judge Raymond Brooks to the Supreme Court, which would allow Atlas to have a swing vote on the court for decades in the future. When Brooks commits suicide after being kidnapped by Bob Lee Swagger, Alvarez refuses to cooperate with the cabal any further.
- Unable to trust the majority of people in his administration, he enlists the help of FBI Special Agent Nadine Memphis and staffer Harris Downey to help bring down Atlas.
- Played by: Benito Martinez.

=== President Juanita Alvarez ===
- President in: Sunstorm
- President of the U.S. in December 2037; leaves office some time before 2042.

=== President Rose Ambrose ===
- President in: a National Lampoon article in the 1980s
- She becomes vice president under President O'Looney, and then president after inducing a fatal heart attack in him during sex.
- Tired of the presidency, Ambrose asks her aide, Wendy Hauser, to assassinate her. Although Hauser cannot go through with it, former First Lady to President O'Looney and others carry out the assassination. Ambrose is shot over 1,500 times, but it is reported that a lone gunman was responsible.

=== President Esker Scott Anderson ===
- President in: The Company by John Ehrlichman, adapted as TV miniseries Washington: Behind Closed Doors.
- Anderson is a roman à clef representation of Lyndon Baines Johnson.
- Former senator from Oregon, elected vice president with President William Arthur Curry.
- Becomes president when Curry is killed when Air Force One crashes.
- Serves eighteen months of President Curry's term, plus one full term of his own.
- Declines to run for a second term due to an illness.
- Party: Democratic
- Played by Andy Griffith

=== President Johnson P. Annarbor ===
- President in: Newsreaders
- Serves from 1889 to 1893.
- Completely forgotten by history.
- First president to be elected despite losing both the popular and electoral vote.
- Party: Republicans

=== President Caesare Appleton ===
- President in: Emperor of America
- Party: Royalty Party
- His name is a reference to Julius Caesar, his career mirrors that of Napoleon Bonaparte, and he satirizes Ronald Reagan
- Appleton is a colonel in the United States Army who defeats an attempted Sandinista invasion of Western Europe. The Royalty Party and National Rifle Association destroy Washington, D.C. with a nuclear bomb on March 18, 1990, with Appleton declaring himself president shortly after. He eventually becomes Caesare I, Emperor of America.

=== President Archer ===
- President in: Van Helsing
- Was presumably Vice-President to President Davis Park prior to the Rising and was sworn in when he was presumed to be killed by the vampires.
- Revealed in Season 4 to still be alive and leading the portions of America still under human control.
- Travels to Fort Collins to personally investigate things after her envoy is killed by the Oracle. She arrives after Jack and Violet have entered the Dark Realm to confront Dracula and returned, with Jack seemingly unharmed and Violet unconscious. Informed about everything that has happened, she offers to escort the Van Helsings and their friends to the safe zone to work together to fight the other vampires.
- Is killed by Dracula, who trapped Jack in the Dark Realm and took her form to escape. Dracula proceeds to take Archer's form in order to take over the safe zone and further her own agenda.
- Played by: Jill Teed

=== President Joseph Armando ===
- President in: Mars
- Nation's first Hispanic president. Elected sometime in the early 21st century.
- During his administration, NASA orchestrates the first crewed mission to Mars.
- Party: Democratic

=== President-Elect Robert Arthur ===
- Elected President at the end of The Manchurian Candidate
- Running mate Raymond Shaw is a mind-controlled puppet of multinational corporation Manchurian Global
- Wins against Vice President Nelson.
- Targeted by Manchurian Global to ensure they have a man in the White House.
- Raymond Shaw and his mother Elanor Prentiss-Shaw are killed in New York by Ben Marco.
- FBI cover up Marco's involvement and put the blame on Manchurian Global.
- Party: Unnamed. Implied to be Democratic

=== President Chester Z. Arthur ===
- President in: Futurama
- Served as either President of the U.S. or Earth prior to the year 3000.
- Seen only in the episode "All the Presidents' Heads"
- By 3011, his head has been preserved inside a head in a jar at the New New York Head Museum.
- Parody of Chester A. Arthur, who also resides at the Head Museum.

=== President Janice Ashby ===
- President in: An Absolutely Remarkable Thing and A Beautifully Foolish Endeavor
- President during humanity's first contact with Carl.

=== President Benjamin Asher ===
- President in: Olympus Has Fallen and London Has Fallen
- Married to Margaret Asher until her death in a car crash while travelling to a fundraiser from Camp David. He is the sole parent of their son, Connor Asher.
- Kidnapped and held hostage in 2013 when North Korean terrorists take over the White House by disguising themselves as members of the South Korean delegation. Later shot during an altercation with the terrorist leader Kang Yeonsak, but survives.
- Captured again when visiting London in 2016 by Islamic terrorists loyal to Aamir Barkawi, after several coordinated bombings and attacks in the city decimate his security detail.
- Is to be executed on an internet livestream, but survives due to a joint effort of SAS, US Secret Service and Delta Force.
- Secret Service codename: "Southpaw"
- Party: Not mentioned, but implied to be Republican.
- Played by: Aaron Eckhart

=== President Henry Ashton ===
- President in: Vantage Point
- Married to First Lady Kay Ashton.
- Administration includes White House Chief of Staff Phil McCullough and National Security Advisor Ted Heinkin.
- Previously experienced an assassination attempt which was prevented by Secret Service Special Agent Thomas Barnes.
- Hosts the World Summit Against Terrorism in Salamanca, Spain when the NSA receives intel there is a credible assassination threat against him. Therefore, he elects to have his body double attend the summit in his absence, who is later shot by terrorists loyal to a cell of the Mujahideen Brigades based in Morocco.
- At the same time, the Hotel Vesta in Salamanca is attacked by a suicide bomber and a member of the Spanish Special Forces blackmailed into working for the terrorists. Along with a corrupt member of his Secret Service detail, they succeed in killing his Secret Service team, control room and advisors, and kidnap President Ashton with the plan to transport him out of Salamanca in an ambulance.
- The kidnapping attempt is ultimately foiled by Special Agent Barnes, who uncovers the conspiracy and saves Ashton's life.
- Ashton is then evacuated by Marine One for medical treatment.
- Secret Service codename: Eagle
- Party: Unknown
- Played by: William Hurt

=== President "The Astro-nut" ===
- President in: Swan Song
- Former astronaut and senator
- Is persuaded into taking a foreign policy stance which causes World War III by his military advisors.
- Is left guilt-ridden by the nuclear destruction.
- Survives the destruction of his plane over Virginia and spends the next seven years as a hermit inside a West Virginia coal mine.
- Meets and cares for at least one refugee over the next seven years while suffering from mental and/or physical trauma that cause him to believe that he is God, fallen from the heavens, and entrusted with the duty of using the nuclear football salvaged from his plane to scourge the world in the event that "evil" triumphs in the war's aftermath.
- Is murdered by the novel's antagonist after arming his missiles, in a failed attempt to make sure they will still launch if he changes his mind.

=== President Richard Tucker Attenborough ===
- President in: Shelley's Heart by Charles McCarry (1995 novel)
- Speaker of the House, he becomes president after the resignation of impeached President Bedford Forrest Lockwood.
- Next in line of succession due to the death of Vice President Williston Graves.
- His efforts resolve a Constitutional crisis due to an election stolen by computer fraud.
- Leaves office under the provisions of the 25th Amendment as soon as Vice President Sam Clark is confirmed by the Congress due to ill health.
- Party: Democratic

=== President Nicholas Franklin Augustine ===
- President in: Acts of Mercy by Bill Pronzini and Barry N. Malzberg
- Formerly a junior senator from California
- Works closely with his chief domestic aide, Maxwell Harper, and Secret Service agent Christopher Justice to investigate a plot against him.
- Augustine is revealed to have gone insane, that neither Harper nor Justice are actual people, and that all his conversations with them throughout the book have been figments of his imagination.

=== President (A House of Dynamite) ===
- President in A House of Dynamite
- Never referred to by name in the film, and credited only as POTUS.
- Married to the First Lady, referred to only as Alison, who is on a safari in Kenya during the films events.
- Cabinet and executive staff includes Secretary of Defense Reid Baker, National Security Advisor Dr. Richard Holland, Deputy National Security Advisor Jake Baerington and Chairman of the Joint Chiefs of Staff General Rodbell.
- In office during a national crisis when an ICBM is detected over the Pacific Ocean and targeted at Chicago. Although suspected to originate from North Korea, it is also implied the missile could have been launched by Russia or China, as DSP satellites fail to capture the initial launch location.
- Ground-Based Interceptor's equipped with EKV's launched from Fort Greely, Alaska fail to take out the warhead, and additional ones from the USA's limited supply cannot be launched in case they are needed to repel further warheads, effectively dooming Chicago to be destroyed unless the warhead malfunctions.
- The President is evacuated from a basketball event with WNBA star Angel Reese and transported in The Beast to Andrews Air Force Base, where he is flown by Marine One towards the Raven Rock Mountain Complex.
- Meanwhile, the FEMA Office of National Continuity Programs evacuates various federal government officials and members of Congress, and vital staff at the White House are escorted to the PEOC bunker in case Washington, D.C. is targeted next.
- The President asks the Secretary of Defense for advice, but Baker commits suicide by jumping from the roof of The Pentagon whilst being evacuated, having been unable to secure extraction for his estranged daughter who lives in Chicago.
- Due to the severity of the situation, and receiving conflicting advice, the President quickly becomes overwhelmed. Both General Anthony Brady of STRATCOM and his military aide Lieutenant Commander Robert Reeves advise him to use the nuclear football to launch pre-emptive attacks on their enemies to deter and prevent further launches. However, DNSA Baerington urges him not to retaliate, advising the Russian Foreign Minister assured him Russia (and likely China) are not responsible, but will respond with their own nuclear weapons if they are threatened.
- The film ends when the President authenticates the nuclear launch Gold Codes, with Northrop B-2 Spirit bombers, missile silo's at Malmstrom Air Force Base and the Ohio-class ballistic submarine USS Nevada standing by to receive his orders.
- Secret Service codename: Icon
- Portrayed by: Idris Elba
- Political Party: Unspecified

== B ==
=== President Charles Bachler ===
- President in Jack Ryan Seasons 3 and 4
- Succeeded President Andrew Pickett.
- Cabinet includes Vice President Robert Fleming and Secretary of Defense Hank Galen.
- Is in office during a crisis where various members of the Russian government led by Defence Minister Alexei Petrov plan a coup d'état against President Leonid Surikov, so they can enter into war with the United States by staging a false flag attack, and as a consequence enable invasion of former territories to re-establish historic USSR borders.
- When the USS Roosevelt is targeted by the Russian warship Fearless, commanded by a captain involved with the coup, President Bachler orders the Roosevelt to stand down after the Fearless captain is taken into custody by the executive officer.
- Is also in office when a rogue element of the CIA assassinates President of Nigeria Udoh as part of a wider conspiracy to establish and control a global crime syndicate involving Nigerian ports, triads in Myanmar and drug cartels in Mexico. The conspiracy is later thwarted by CIA officer Jack Ryan and his colleagues.
- Played by: David Bedella
- Political Party: Unspecified

=== President Talcott Quincy Bailey ===
- President in: 34 East by Alfred Coppel.
- Wealthy New Englander who served as a U.S. senator.
- On his way to a summit meeting with the Soviet Deputy Premier in the Sinai Desert, his convoy was ambushed and he is captured by terrorists.
- While he is being taken prisoner, Air Force One crashes due to the pilot having a sudden heart attack and the president is mortally wounded.
- Bailey is rescued just before a nuclear war is about to be launched.

=== President Henry Baines ===
- President in: Paradise
- Serving as Vice President under President Cal Bradford, Baines relocates along with Bradford and 25,000 other Americans to an underground city, Liberty Grove, in Colorado when the world experiences an extinction event.
- Bradford and Baines remain as the official President and Vice President. Still, by and large, they're figureheads to reassure the surviving populace, as the daily operations of Liberty Grove fall mostly to Samantha Redmond, a billionaire industrialist and creator of the Liberty Grove project.
- Three years later, Bradford is murdered. Baines announces his death at a special town hall event for citizens. However, the government covers up the circumstances of his death by saying he died of natural causes to avoid panic.
- Baines is sworn in as the new President at the same event.
- During his Vice Presidency and subsequent Presidency, Baines proves to be easily rattled and shaken by the events he faces. His manner privately exasperates Redmond, and she considers him little more than a puppet. However, when Redmond is incapacitated by one of her own assassins (Secret Service Agent Jane Driscoll) turning on her, Baines takes her place at the head of the group of billionaires controlling Liberty Grove.
- Upon taking control, Baines takes steps to assert his authority, including having dissidents like Bradford's teenage son Jeremy arrested, and demoting Secret Service chief Nicole Robinson, who had partaken in a failed rebellion against the billionaires.
- When Redmond recovers, Baines attempts to assert his position as leader of the bunker over her. However, she arranges to have Driscoll assassinate him and blame Robinson's rebel group for it.
- Following Baines' murder, his position isn't replaced, with Redmond taking overt control over the billionaire council. Therefore, Baines can be considered to be the 'last' President of the United States, at least in official terms.
- Played by Matt Malloy

=== President Phil Baker ===
- President in: Supergirl
- Former vice president who becomes president when Olivia Marsdin resigns.
- Lex Luthor takes out Marsdin's original running mate so Senator Baker could take their place.
- Secretly colluding with Luthor, Baker works to persecute aliens living in America, eventually putting Ben Lockwood in charge of all alien affairs and deputizing Lockwood's "Children of Liberty" hate group.
- Arrested after his association with Luthor is exposed.
- Played by Bruce Boxleitner
- Party: Democratic

=== President Bill Baker ===
- President in: Invasion by Eric L. Harry (novel)
- Former B-movie actor, he leads the United States when it is invaded by China. Shortly before the invasion he orders the conscription of all 18–24-year-old Americans.
- Has an estranged daughter, Stephie, a soldier who is drafted into the U.S. Army.
- Presumably based on Ronald Reagan.
- Party: Republican

=== President Robert Baker ===
- President in: The Peacekeeper
- Speaks with a southern accent.
- Former Chief of Staff of the United States Army
- Running for re-election.
- Played by: Roy Scheider

=== President Samuel Baker ===
- President in: Favorite Son by Steve Sohmer (1988 novel), the NBC miniseries (played by James Whitmore), and Patriots (1990 novel)
- Former U.S. Senator from Virginia.
- Elected in 1984.
- Baker attempts to drop Vice President Daniel Eastman in favor of Texas Senator Terry Fallon as his running mate in 1988.
- In 1991 is faced with a military coup d'état by a group of fanatical Vietnam veterans who are upset that President Baker pledged to sign a nuclear arms treaty with the Soviet Union.

=== President James Ballantine ===
- President in: Tom Clancy's Ghost Recon Advanced Warfighter (2006 video game)
- Visits Mexico City to sign the fictional North American Joint Security Agreement (NAJSA) with the Mexican President and the Canadian Prime Minister.
- Survives an assassination and multiple kidnapping attempts in Mexico City during a coup d'état by Mexican soldiers opposed to NAJSA; rescued by the Ghosts Special Forces Team.

=== President William Ballard ===
- President in: Politika by Tom Clancy
- During his administration, Boris Yeltsin dies of a heart attack. A group of Russian freedom fighters attempt to spark a civil war within Russia in the hopes of overthrowing the government.
- Injured in an assassination attempt while attending Yeltsin's funeral, but survives.
- Party: Democratic

=== President John Ballentine ===
- President in: The Sentinel
- Targeted for assassination at a G8 summit in Toronto (film)
- Secret Service code name: Classic (film), Victory (novel)
- Played by David Rasche
- Party: Republican

=== President Barbie ===
- President in: the Barbie line of dolls
- Most presidential Barbie dolls are only presidential candidates but several have been depicted as presidents (e.g. the four Barbie Can be President dolls from 2012).
- SNL parodied this doll concept during the 2016 election (season 41, episode 19).
- President Barbie in the film Barbie (played by Issa Rae) is not a president of the United States but of Barbieland.

=== President Paul Barnard ===
- President in the Netflix thriller series Trinity
- His administration includes Secretary of Defense Webb Preston, who becomes involved in a conspiracy with Commander Katherine Decker, the XO of the Ohio-class submarine USS Kansas.
- Portrayed by: James Remar

=== President Cliff Barnes ===
- President in: "Conundrum" (aired May 3, 1991, Dallas (1978 TV series) episode)
- In an alternate universe where J.R. Ewing had never been born, Barnes attains a successful political career and becomes the vice president. When the president has a stroke, Barnes is promoted and, according to "Adam", the otherworldly being who guides J.R. through this alternate world, is one of the country's greatest.
- Played by: Ken Kercheval

=== President Harry Barnes ===
- President in: 24 Declassified novels
- 43rd President (1997–2001)
- Party: Republican
- Loses to David Palmer in the 2000 presidential election.

=== President Pamela Barnes ===
- President in The President's Daughter by Bill Clinton and James Patterson
- Former vice president to the novel's protagonist Matthew Keating, before she defeats him in the primary elections
- Challenged by Keating to a rematch for the upcoming election at the end of the novel

=== President Leo Barnett ===
- President in: Wild Cards
- May have had the superhuman ability to heal injuries and diseases

=== President Ashley J. Barrett ===
- President in: The Boys (season 5)
- Formerly an employee of Vought International, the conglomerate responsible for creating Compound V, a drug capable of imbuing people with superpowers, and marketing superheroes and superhero teams, namely The Seven. Originally the Director of Talent Relations, she was fired after Starlight revealed during a live broadcast of a prayer event that she was sexually assaulted by The Deep. However, Barrett would be rehired and promoted to Senior Vice President of Hero Management following the murder of the previous incumbent Madelyn Stillwell, albeit at Homelander's insistence so that he could use her as a puppet to spy on CEO Stan Edgar. After Homelander engineers the removal of Edgar, Barrett becomes CEO in his absence albeit as a puppet to Homelander, later being demoted to 'mascot' when he promotes Seven member Sister Sage to CEO. During this time, Ashley develops stress-induced trichotillomania (later developing into one of many paraphilia), requiring her to wear a wig.
- Following Secretary of Defense Robert 'Dakota Bob' Singer's election as President in 2024, Homelander leads efforts to assassinate him and install a Supe-supremacist regime under the puppet leadership of Singer's running mate Victoria K. Neuman (a corrupt closeted Supe and Stan Edgar's adopted daughter). After exposing Neuman as a Supe on live television during the certification of the election results, Homelander orders the deaths of any Vought officers who may have compromising information concerning the attempted coup d'état, leading Ashley to inject herself with Compound V for protection.
- Despite CIA-sponsored black-ops group The Boys foiling attempts on Singer's life and their leader Billy Butcher unauthorisedly assassinating Neuman, Sister Sage frames Singer for ordering Neuman's death to engineer the elevation of Speaker of the House Steven Calhoun to the presidency under the Twenty-fifth Amendment, albeit as a puppet to Homelander. Ashley is appointed as his Vice President as part of Vought's takeover of the United States government, publicly supporting actions including the internment of Starlight supporters in 'freedom camps' and the pardoning of Soldier Boy for treason (allegations manufactured by Vought to cover up his detainment by the Soviets, later the Russians).
- Now publicly identifying as a Supe, Ashley gained psychic abilities, albeit gaining a second face with its own consciousness (which she calls Bashley) which encourages her to resist Homelander.
- To improve her standing with supporters of the Calhoun administration and Homelander, Ashley is arranged to be married to Supe preacher Oh Father.
- Sister Sage encourages Ashley to read Soldier Boy's mind to aid in a plot to kill Homelander, albeit as part of a greater plot to bring about an apocalyptic human-Supe war that she would avoid in a bunker in the hope of being left in peace (offering Ashley a place there in return).
- After Homelander becomes egothetistic and injects himself with V1 (the earliest version of Compound V which grants immortality and immunity to a Supe-killing virus being developed by The Boys), he orders President Calhoun to issue several outrageous executive orders. These include dissolving all separations between church and state and declaring the Democratic Church of America (founded to legitimise Homelander's 'divinity') the official national religion, disbanding Congress to remove opposition, and banning abortions and nut milk. After Ashley reveals that Calhoun is hesitant about Homelander's demands, Homelander violently kills him in the Oval Office, automatically elevating Ashley to the presidency.
- During Homelander's announcement of his 'divinity' in a live televised address from the Oval Office, Ashley rescues The Boys from a trap along a secret tunnel to the White House. While en route to kill Homelander, The Boys kill The Deep and Oh Father.
- After The Boys depower and kill Homelander on live television, Ashley claims to have ordered the CIA to eliminate Homelander as a threat to democracy. Stating that she did nothing wrong and that she would not resign, she is unanimously impeached by Congress and removed from office.
- She is eventually succeeded by an exonerated Robert Singer.
- Ashley Barrett is one of two characters in the live-action television series based on the comics character Jessica A. "Jess" Bradley, a senior Vought American officer who is ultimately used by The Guy from Vought as a scapegoat for the unsuccessful Supe coup d'état against the United States government. The second televisual character based on her is the Supe Sister Sage (played by Susan Heyward), the 'The Smartest Person on Earth', who is also called Jessica Bradley.
- Political Party: Republican (presumably)
- Portrayed by: Colby Minifie

=== President Josiah "Jed" Bartlet ===
- President in: The West Wing
- Has relapsing and remitting multiple sclerosis
- Played by: Martin Sheen, who has been introduced at speaking engagements before audiences as "the Acting President of The United States".
- Political Party: Democratic

=== President Andy Bates ===
- President in: Deadlands: Hell on Earth roleplaying game.
- Known as "A-Bomb Andy" for his pro-nuclear war stance against the Confederacy.
- Elected as vice president in 2078, takes office in 2081 when Mary Rose Tremane disappears.
- Dies on September 23, 2081, when Washington, D.C. is hit with a nuclear missile.

=== President Joe Bauer (aka Not Sure) ===
- President in: Idiocracy
- U.S. Army Private Joe Bauer is frozen for five hundred years, and succeeds President Camacho after being Camacho's late-term appointment as Secretary of Interior (and later Vice President), sometime after 2505. Due to a record keeping mistake, is listed in official records as first name Not, last name Sure.
- Elected president due to success in ending nationwide famine by getting crops to grow, and for having the highest IQ on the planet.
- Champions a mostly unsuccessful effort to revive cultural development and education.
- Played by Luke Wilson.

=== President Buster Baxter ===
- President in: Arthur
- In one episode, Arthur imagines Buster as president.
- Played by: Daniel Brochu

=== President Baywater ===
- President in: Noah by Sebastian Fitzek
- Is a controlled puppet of a secret, worldwide society of elitists that exceeds democratic elected governments

=== Acting President Fowler Beal ===
- President in: 34 East by Alfred Coppel (novel).
- Originally Speaker of the House when the president is killed in the crash of Air Force One.
- Becomes acting president when Vice President Talcott Quincy Bailey is taken hostage by Arab terrorists in the Sinai.
- Nearly launches a nuclear attack on the Soviet Union after being persuaded by Admiral Stuart Ainsworth.

=== President "The Beast" ===
- President in: Transmetropolitan
- Dubbed "The Beast" by Spider Jerusalem, who despises him, in an editorial.
- Subsequently defeated in a landslide by candidate Gary Callahan.

=== President David Beccerra ===
- President in: Tom Clancy's EndWar
- First Hispanic US president
- During his presidency, the US launches the Freedom Star Military Space Station amid global protests.
- The U.S. and Europe engage in an arms race.
- World War III occurs between the U.S., Russia, and Europe.

=== President Tom Beck ===
- President in: Deep Impact
- During his administration, much of the Eastern Seaboard is devastated by a comet impact in the Atlantic Ocean that causes a megatsunami.
- He leads his country during the crisis and personally leads the reconstruction efforts after the second comet is destroyed.
- Nation's first African-American president.
- Played by: Morgan Freeman

=== President Raymond Becker ===
- President in: The Day After Tomorrow
- Caricature of Dick Cheney
- Played by: Kenneth Welsh
- Former vice president, succeeds President Richard Blake, who failed to escape from Washington, D.C. to the south, after his death.
- Opposed the evacuation of the United States in the wake of an ensuing environmental disaster out of fear for the U.S. economy.
- Much of the U.S. is devastated by the onset of a new Ice Age that freezes most of the Northern Hemisphere.
- Leads the government-in-exile in Mexico.
- During his first address to the nation, he orders a nationwide search-and-rescue effort after the storms dissipate.
- Party: Republican

=== President Andrew Bee ===
- President in: Line of Succession by Brian Garfield (1972 novel).
- Former congressman and senator from California
- Chosen by Vice President Elect Dexter Ethridge to be his vice president if kidnapped President Elect Clifford Fairlie is not rescued.
- Takes office after Ethridge dies from wounds received in terrorist bombing of the US Senate, and Fairlie dies during an attempted rescue mission.
- Party: Republican

=== President-elect Cyrus Rutherford Beene ===
- President-elect in Scandal Season 6
- First openly gay President-elect.
- Former White House Chief of Staff to President Fitzgerald Thomas Grant III.
- After he is fired from the White House he switches sides, managing the presidential campaign of Francisco Vargas, the Democratic Governor of Pennsylvania.
- Selected as vice presidential nominee by Vargas after he wins the Democratic primaries.
- Becomes vice president-elect after Vargas wins the 2016 Presidential Election.
- Elevated to president-elect mere hours later, after Vargas is assassinated during his victory speech in Fairmount Park on election night. Uncertainty after the election led to the Electoral College results being contested into Congress, with Republican nominee Mellie Grant ending up as president-elect instead, replacing Beene.
- After the covert assassination of Vice President Luna Vargas on Inauguration Day, Beene is nominated as her replacement but serves briefly until he is forced to resign for trying to usurp power from President Grant.
- Married to Michael Ambruso.
- Previously married to White House Press Secretary James Novak until his death.
- Played by: Jeff Perry
- Party: Democratic on paper, Republican in terms of ideology.

=== President Adam Benford ===
- President in: Resident Evil 6
- An American Government official and a former US Military officer who would eventually become President from January 20, 2011 to June 29, 2013. He was responsible for recruiting former R.PD. Officer Leon Kennedy for government service after the Raccoon City incident and considered him a close friend.
- Played by: Michael Donovan

=== President Edward Bennett ===
- President in: Clear and Present Danger
- Orders a covert war against Colombian drug lords but is exposed by Jack Ryan.
- Played by: Donald Moffat

=== President Jonathan Bennett ===
- President in: Hellbent and Out of the Dark by Gregg Hurwitz
- Has been in office for five years as of Out of the Dark, facing a tough set of midterm elections and increasing Congressional scrutiny about the aggressive extent of his foreign and defense policy.
- As Under Secretary of Defense for Policy during the 1990s, Bennett sanctions numerous off-the-books special operations using the Orphan Program, a secret US government initiative that trains teenage orphans to become highly skilled assassins.
- During his presidency, Bennett supports Charles Van Sciver, a ruthless and highly skilled Orphan, to become the Orphan Program Director. Bennett orders the assassinations of all Orphan operatives not loyal to Van Sciver to cover up his own role in sanctioning operations during his time as Under Secretary of Defense.
- Van Sciver, under Bennett's orders, eliminates former Orphans but fails to kill Evan Smoak, known as Orphan X, who had been the one to carry out the assassination of the Serbian Foreign Minister. Van Sciver is killed by Smoak, who then threatens Bennett that he will assassinate him.
- In response, Bennett assembles a team led by his close ally and Orphan A, Judd Holt, to eliminate Smoak. He also marshals the Secret Service against Smoak but does not tell them why Smoak is trying to assassinate him.
- Smoak kills Bennett's White House Deputy Chief of Staff Doug Wetzel, who had also been complicit in the assassinations. He also stages a mortar attack on Bennett's motorcade. Finally, Smoak kills Holt and the criminals he has assembled.
- The numerous attempts on his life drive Bennett into intense paranoia about how Smoak would kill him, with Smoak planting poison in the lens of Bennett's glasses. The poison slowly filters into Bennett's skin, causing him to have a fatal heart attack in the Oval Office.
- Smoak then releases evidence of Bennett's crimes to ruin his legacy after his death.

=== President Monroe Bennett ===
- President in: Salvation
- Served as vice president under President Pauline Mackenzie.
- Is in office during a time of crisis when a large asteroid codenamed "Samson" is scheduled to crash into the Earth. He tries to redirect measures taken to destroy the asteroid to have it break into smaller ones, which would be redirected to land on and decimate both Russia and China, nations he believed posed a significant threat to the United States.
- Believing Mackenzie to be too weak to proceed with such a plan, he conspires to poison her with mercury, deteriorating her health to the point where she suffered from memory loss and a stroke whilst addressing the nation in the Oval Office.
- Upon reports that the stroke is fatal, he ascends to the presidency under the 25th Amendment, and later tries to proceed with nuclear military action against Russia after it appeared they attacked a United States Navy ship. The attack was actually the work of militant hacker group RE/SYST, whose desire was to help deteriorate US-Russian relations.
- Mackenzie is later revealed to be alive and recovering in secret from the mercury poisoning, and has Secretary of Defense Harris Edwards and others loyal to her detain Bennett beneath the White House so she can appeal to the Cabinet and the military to be reinstated.
- Before he can be imprisoned for treason he is recaptured from United States Secret Service custody by members of the United States Army loyal to him. After hiding out in an abandoned military base for a week, he emerges and takes his case to the Supreme Court of the United States, arguing he is still lawfully president and his removal from office was illegal and unconstitutional. When the court appears to vote in Mackenzie's favour, he orchestrates bombing of the building which seriously injures the Chief Justice, whose swing vote in the decision had yet to be announced.
- After the Supreme Court bombing, the capital falls into chaos as infighting between United States Armed Forces factions loyal to Bennett and others to Mackenzie battle to take control. US Army and Secret Service officers loyal to Bennett lock down and infiltrate the White House, capturing and detaining Mackenzie in the Oval Office.
- As Bennett is about to address the nation, video footage of the now conscious Chief Justice is broadcast on all networks and cell phones, in which he confirms his vote in Mackenzie's favour, shifting the decision to 5-4 and rendering her the legal president. After a brief standoff, the soldiers accompanying Bennett realize they have been deceived and reaffirm their allegiance to Mackenzie, and then place Bennett under arrest along with their own commanding general who led the assault on the White House.
- Played by: Sasha Roiz

=== President Richard Benson ===
- President in: Megiddo: The Omega Code 2
- Played by: R. Lee Ermey

=== President Thomas "Tug" Benson ===
- President in: Hot Shots! Part Deux
- Former navy admiral
- Played by: Lloyd Bridges

=== President Joseph Emerson Benton ===
- President in: Ultimatum by Matthew Glass
- Elected in 2032 as the 48th president
- Main character in the novel, who faces an inevitable mass relocation of inhabitants of coastal and semi-arid locations as global warming worsens, while trying to negotiate a deal with the Chinese government on emissions cutbacks.
- Party: Democratic

=== President William F. Berndt ===
- President in: Ragland by John Van Orsdell (1972 novel).
- Former U.S. Senator.
- Dies in office from a massive heart attack.

=== President Matthew Bernstein ===
- President in: 2030: The Real Story of What Happens to America
- First Jewish President
- Former Speaker of the House
- President when massive earthquake hits Los Angeles
- Divorces wife while in office
- Party: Democratic

=== President Charles Berquist ===
- President in: The Parsifal Mosaic

=== President Berzowski (first name not given) ===
- President in: For Us, the Living by Robert Heinlein
- Becomes president in 2001

=== President Anna Bester ===
- President in: Eclipse Trilogy
- Also called "the American Margaret Thatcher", Bester is in office during a third World War with Russia.
- Towards the end of the war, Bester's administration suffers a major political scandal when it is revealed that she collaborated with the Second Alliance Security Corporation, a front organization for a global neo-fascist conspiracy.
- Party: most likely Republican

=== President Philip Bester ===
- President in: Shadowrun
- 44th U.S. President (2005–2009)
- Defeats incumbent Martin Hunt in the 2004 election.
- Defeated by Jesse Garrety in the 2008 election.

=== President "The Big Guy" ===
- President in: World War Z
- First Black president of Jamaican descent - implied to be Colin Powell, due to his military background.
- President of a bipartisan administration based in the new American capital of Honolulu.
- Succeeds his predecessor who dies of catatonic shock after the ill-fated Battle of Yonkers
- After a period of relative stability in the new world, he decides to take the United States back on the offensive against 200 million zombies
- Dies in office and is replaced by Vice President "The Wacko" (implied to be Howard Dean)

=== President Bill ===
- President in: President Bill: A Graphic Epic by William L. Brown.
- Becomes president after winning a lottery.

=== President Hosea Blackford ===
- President in: American Empire: The Center Cannot Hold
- First appears in the first novel How Few Remain.
- From the State of Dakota (North and South Dakota not having been established as separate states possibly due to the decline of the Republicans), Blackford meets Abraham Lincoln as a young man during the Second Mexican War and was inspired to pursue a political career, becoming a Socialist and serving as congressman from Dakota.
- Runs for vice president in 1920 under Upton Sinclair and the wins over Democratic incumbent Theodore Roosevelt, who was running for an unprecedented third term. The ticket is re-elected in 1924. Personally believing that the position of Vice President held little influence, Blackford described himself as a "$12,000 a year hat rack".
- Defeats Calvin Coolidge for the presidency in 1928 by a narrow margin and becomes the 30th President of the United States.
- Blackford was unable to prevent the Business Collapse in 1929. The Pacific War against Japan erupts in 1932, and the Japanese attack Los Angeles during the Socialist National Convention. Blackford is defeated by Coolidge in a landslide in the 1932 election, but Coolidge dies on January 5, 1933, of a heart attack less than a month before taking office. Coolidge's running mate, Herbert Hoover, becomes the 31st president on February 1.
- Married to Socialist congresswoman from New York Flora Blackford (née Hamburger) and had a son, Joshua Blackford. A lapsed Episcopalian, Blackford was comfortable marrying a Jew and for their son to be raised Jewish.
- Dies in 1937. At his state funeral in his native Dakota, former President Hoover and former President Sinclair serve as his pallbearers.

=== President Stephen Henry Blades ===
- President in: Letter 44 by Charles Soule (comic book series, 2013–2017)
- 44th President of the United States.
- Learns upon taking office that NASA discovered an alien artifact in asteroid belt seven years earlier, and that a secret crewed mission has been sent out to investigate it.
- First Lady: Isobel; son: Mark.

=== President Richard Blake ===
- President in: The Day After Tomorrow (2004 film)
- Caricature of George W. Bush
- Orders the mass evacuation of the south of the U.S. into Mexico, after cancelling all debt to Mexico in order for the Mexican government to agree to house the surviving US and Canadian citizens.
- Refuses to leave the White House during the snowstorm, instead still trying to get surviving people evacuated. Leaves eventually after being persuaded to evacuate to the refugee camps in Mexico.
- Dies of hypothermia after Marine One crashes due to its wings freezing, and is succeeded by Vice President Becker.
- Party: Republican
- Played by: Perry King

=== President Robert Blair ===
- President in: Saint by Ted Dekker (2006 novel)
- Survives an assassination attempt by Johnny Drake under the identity Carl Saint.
- Is President in 2033, 23 years after the Raison Crisis.

=== President George Blush ===
- President in: America 2014: An Orwellian Tale (novel)
- Fourth-term president

=== President John Blutarsky ===
- President in: Where Are They Now? A Delta Alumni Update
- Played by John Belushi

=== President Donald Blythe ===
- President in: House of Cards
- Acting President after the attempted assassination of President Frank Underwood
- Signs the Presidential Incapacitation Certificate in Chapter 43; Underwood declares himself fit and is reinstated in Chapter 45
- Party: Democratic

=== President Bolton ===
- President in: Last Resort
- Members of his administration include Secretary of Defense William Curry and Senior Advisor Amanda Straugh.
- Is under impeachment proceedings by Congress when he orders a nuclear attack on Pakistan.
- When members of the United States Navy aboard the Ohio-class ballistic missile submarine USS Colorado refuse to carry out the order, they are branded as traitors by his administration, who attempts to have them killed by another submarine, the USS Illinois.
- Bolton then has other US forces launch the attack on Pakistan, which destroy Karachi and Islamabad. His actions result in the United States becoming a pariah state and globally condemned by the United Nations. Subsequently, China uses the international turmoil as pretext to invade Taiwan and India moves troops into Pakistani-controlled regions of Kashmir.
- It is later revealed Bolton's administration had a team of United States Navy SEALs kill a nuclear weapons inspector and plant evidence that Pakistan posed an immediate threat of using both its nuclear arsenal and constructing suitcase nukes, to give the US justification for launching their own nuclear strikes.
- He is almost removed from office when members of the federal government, several former Joint Chiefs of Staff and the United States Secret Service meet in secret to organize and plot a coup d'état. The coup fails, and the lead conspirator, Speaker of the House Conrad Buell, confesses to the machinations live on C-SPAN before committing suicide in the chamber.
- Bolton is ultimately assassinated by defense lobbyist Kylie Sinclair, who feigned allegiance to his cause to get close to him despite being disgusted by his actions. Prior to shooting him, she released evidence of his administrations treachery to the press.
- Portrayed by: Peter Martorano
- Political Party: Unspecified

=== President Allison Bonner ===
- President in Steve Pieczenk's 1992 Book Maximum Vigilance.
- Former Vice President to President Donald Westview.
- Becomes President after Westview resigns after a mental breakdown.

=== President Andrew Boone ===
- President in: Swing Vote
- Incumbent President seeking re-election.
- With New Mexico's electoral college votes hanging on the decision of apolitical apathetic voter Bud Johnson, Boone attempts to win his vote by endorsing same-sex marriage and environmental protection.
- The fate of the election is left unknown, with Bud deciding to hold a debate between the two candidates, asking questions submitted via mail.
- Played by Kelsey Grammer
- Party: Republican

=== President Betty Boop ===
- Elected president in Betty Boop for President (1932)
- It is unclear whether the cartoon shows actual scenes from Betty's presidency or merely visions of her proposals
- Apparently favors the repeal of Prohibition

=== President Robert L. Booth ===
- President in: Judge Dredd
- Booth is the last President of the United States.
- He triggers the Third World War in 2070, and is deposed and sentenced for 100 years.

=== President Borman ===
- President in: "AKA Superman" (Lois & Clark: The New Adventures of Superman)
- Former president who put the Annihilator Satellite in orbit, but Congress cancelled funding before it could be activated.
- Is defeated for re-election by President Garner.

=== President Marion Bosworth ===
- President in: Call of Duty: Black Ops II and Call of Duty: Strike Team
- Former Speaker of the House
- Party: Democratic

=== President Sherman Bothwell ===
- President in: Rama II
- Nicknamed "Slugger"; former professional baseball player for the Boston Red Sox at the Fenway Dome during the 2170s and 2180s.
- Is president during the late 2190s; elected in 2196 in a landslide and is eligible for re-election in 2200.
- Originally from Missouri and is married to Linda Black, the daughter of the governor of Texas. His first wife died in a boating accident, leaving him a single father, which makes him popular with the U.S. electorate.
- He is opposed by the U.S. Christian Conservative Party.

=== President Marge Bouvier ===
- President in: "The Last Temptation of Homer" (The Simpsons)
- Native of Springfield.
- Bouvier would have been president had she not married Homer; her presidency is shown in a vision to Homer by his guardian angel. She seems to have high approval ratings.

=== President David Bowers ===
- President in: the Splinter Cell series of video games
- Leads the U.S. during the Georgian Information Crisis in Georgia and a rebellion in Indonesia, and defends South Korea during an American-Japanese conspiracy that aimed to start World War III.
- Survives a failed nuclear attack on Nashville, Tennessee, by American terrorists.
- Republican

=== President Andrew Bradford ===
- President in: The Second Lady
- During the Cold War, First Lady Billie Bradford is kidnapped by the KGB and replaced with a Soviet agent who has been surgically altered and specially trained to temporarily take her place in the international spotlight. Through her, the USSR hopes to discover an American secret that could tip the balance of global power in favor of the Soviet Union.
- Party: Democratic

=== President Cal Bradford ===
- President in Paradise
- A native of Kentucky and a 'Southern Progressive', Bradford is the son of oil baron Kane Bradford, one of the world's wealthiest men. Kane pushed Cal into politics against his wishes, and he became a United States Senator before being elected as the 47th President at the age of 42.
- During his first term, Bradford becomes aware of an impending extinction event, projected to occur as the result of the eruption of a supervolcano beneath Antarctica. Bradford, supported by the wealth of his father and other private financiers, oversees the 'Liberty Grove' project, a top-secret underground city in Colorado.
- The project is the brainchild of billionaire industrialist Samantha Redmond, an old friend of Bradford. It intends to save a selected 25,000 Americans to continue life in an idyllic setting. In the years ahead of the expected event, conspiracy theories about Colorado gather pace. This leads to an assassination attempt on Bradford, and he is saved by his lead Secret Service agent, Xavier Collins.
- On the day of the extinction event, Bradford's administration is caught unprepared, as scientific analysis had assured them they'd have weeks rather than hours of preparation. In an address to the American people, Bradford tells them the truth so they can decide how to spend their final moments before being chaotically evacuated from the White House onto Air Force One.
- On that same day, Russia and China begin a nuclear war out of a desire to be the last power standing to control what's left of global resources. Rather than launch the US nuclear arsenal in response, Bradford activates the 'blue option' - an EMP network installed after the Cuban Missile Crisis to electronically fry any nuclear exchanges at the cost of worldwide electricity. Bradford believed such a move would give the humans left behind a fighting chance of survival.
- In Liberty Grove, Bradford serves as a public figurehead for the surviving American population, extending his second term beyond its original period. However, Redmond holds control in reality.
- Upon discovering restricted information showing survivors of the cataclysm on the outside, he announces to Redmond that he intends to release the files to the residents and his family.
- However, before she and her men can silence him, Bradford is killed by Trent, a former project manager during Liberty Grove's construction, posing as the city librarian. Trent was excluded from the project after attempting to blow the whistle on fatal safety violations during excavation. He was the man who tried to assassinate Bradford. Having managed to escape ADX Florence on the day of the eruption, he killed and impersonated the librarian en route to the bunker.
- Bradford was succeeded by Vice President Henry Baines, who was also evacuated to the underground city as part of the selected 25,000.
- Fan of basketball (supporting the Kentucky Wildcats), as well as golf and music of the 1980's and 1990's.
- Married to, but estranged from First Lady Jessica Bradford. Has one son, Jeremy Bradford (named after the Pearl Jam song).
- Secret Service codename: Wildcat
- Portrayed by: James Marsden
- Political Party: Democrat

=== President Bradley ===
- President in: War in the Ice by Simulations Publications Inc. (board game)
- In 1991 war breaks out between the U.S. and the Soviet Union in Antarctica.
- Is defeated for re-election in 1992 primarily because of the war.

=== President Mike Brady ===
- President in: The Brady Bunch in the White House
- Native of California with no political experience.
- Vice President Brady assumes the presidency President Lawrence Randolph resigns. Brady then chooses his wife Carol to be his vice president. Brady has six children (three of his own, and three stepdaughters from Carol Brady's previous marriage).
- Played by: Gary Cole

=== President James 'Jim' Bragg ===
- President in For All Mankind (Season 5)
- Former Governor of Idaho, first elected in 1982 during the second term of Ronald Reagan.
- Served as running mate to Republican nominee Ellen Wilson in 1992, becoming Vice President following their ticket's victory over the Democratic nominee Bill Clinton. Having originally wanted John McCain as her running mate, Wilson reluctantly chose Bragg for his evangelism and anti-science views to balance out the Republican ticket.
- After Wilson came out as a lesbian during a live press conference in 1995, Bragg publicly broke with Wilson and unsuccessfully attempted to challenge her for the Republican nomination in 1996 after unsuccessfully attempting to persuade her to resign to avoid impeachment. He was succeeded on the Republican ticket by Secretary of State George H. W. Bush, whose backing ensured Wilson's renomination. Bragg was subsequently succeeded by Bush as Vice President following Wilson's surprise come-from-behind victory. Bragg spent several years in the political wilderness following his tenure as Vice President.
- Following Al Gore's election as President in 2000, Bragg became a talking head on conservative news channels, criticizing Gore for his liberal policies and mismanaging the space program. Winning the Republican nomination in 2004, Bragg defeated Gore in that year's election by 349 electoral votes to Gore's 189, becoming the 43rd President. Bragg promised to put 'America and Earth first' and attacked Gore for failing to deliver on his promises of economic prosperity due to the theft of an iridium-rich asteroid nicknamed 'Goldilocks' by elements of the Helios Aerospace company.
- During Bragg's first term, North Korea formed a new Mars base separate from the Happy Valley facility following their expulsion from the Mars-7 Alliance (which was subsequently renamed the Mars-6 Alliance) for providing sanctuary for the conspirators behind the theft of Goldilocks; North Korea's expulsion was complicated by Happy Valley's granting of asylum to defecting North Koreans including Lee Jung-Gil, the first man of Mars. In 2006, Bragg appointed Paul Bremer as Happy Valley's inaugural civilian governor, who announced the introduction of the Mars Peacekeepers, a uniformed law enforcement group which replaced undercover intelligence officers attached inter alia to the CIA and KGB whose use of torture against Helios workers in a bid to prevent the theft of Goldilocks resulted in rioting and the accidental shooting of then base commander Danielle Poole. In 2007, a new international alliance called the Independent Spacefaring Nations (comprising China, Brazil, Saudi Arabia, Nigeria, South Africa, Pakistan, Malaysia and Thailand) was formed to challenge the M-6's control over iridium supplies on Mars following the vetoing of UN resolutions by M-6 members the United States, the Soviet Union, France and the United Kingdom as permanent members of the UN Security Council. In 2008, the Soviet aerospace corporation Kuragin was awarded a contract by the M-6 to construct a space elevator between Happy Valley and Goldilocks, beating Helios' bid, with the two companies announcing plans to construct robotic probes to explore the moons of Jupiter and Saturn.
- During Bragg's second term, an electromagnetic radiation shield was constructed at the Happy Valley base in 2009, allowing for the permanent residence of the children of Happy Valley employees (with a school built for their education) and the construction of above-ground habitation modules. In 2011, Happy Valley witnessed the arrival of undocumented migrants fleeing economic hardship caused by global disparities in iridium access and political oppression, nicknamed 'craters' due to their stowing away in pressurized cargo crates; residing in the base's abandoned subterranean quarters, they perform off-the-books work to support themselves. In 2012, the economic boom fueled by iridium ended following the defaulting of non-M-6 nations on loans used to purchase iridium, which in turn sparked protests against M-6 iridium policy in major cities through the M-6's member countries including a weeks-long demonstration in New York's Zuccotti Park; several non-M-6 countries were reported to have boycotted the 2012 Summer Olympics.
- After Jung-Gil is framed for the murder of Yoon Tae-Min, a crater employed by Kuragin, and is aided by Ed Baldwin and other members of the Sons and Daughters of Mars in escaping to a nearby ISN base to seek asylum, and Alex Baldwin leaks several confidential documents revealing plans to automate 98% of work in Happy Valley, Mars Peacekeepers attempt to quell dissent. The MPKs' unsuccessful efforts lead to the takeover of Happy Valley Mission Control and the detention of several M-6 figures including Governor Leonid Polivanov by the SDM. After the SDM issue demands for automation plans to be cancelled and Martian representation within the M-6, Bragg announces the imposition of an embargo on Mars on behalf of the M-6.
- After embargoing Mars for six months, the M-6 forms a multinational force to invade and reclaim Mars. The offensive is conducted disastrously with the SDM destroying landing facilities on asteroid 2003LC, the OPEF Marines killing indiscriminately (including the Sheriff of Mars Palmer James and other Mars Peacekeepers), and the force's base of operations being destroyed. Following the removal of Soviet President Fyodor Korzhenko via a coup, the Soviet Union withdraws from the M-6, resulting in a ceasefire and the independence of Mars.
- Political Party: Republican
- Portrayed by: Randy Oglesby

=== President Daniel Brand ===
- President in: Amerika
- Elected in 1988 over Senator Christopher Winthrop and Congressman Devin Milford.
- President of the United States after the U.S. is crippled by a surprise Soviet EMP Attack and agrees to disarmament.
- Party: Democratic

=== President Daniel Brandenburg ===
- President in: Alternities by Michael P. Kube-McDowell (1988).
- Wins the 1976 election by defeating Republican incumbent Roland Maxwell and Democratic Party nominee Mike Mansfield.
- As president, Brandenburg personally oversees response to an incursion by people from an alternate timeline.
- Party: National

=== President Branford ===
- President in: Jack & Bobby
- Attempts to bring the War of the Americas to an end.

=== President Susan Brayden ===
- President in: DC's Legends of Tomorrow, The Flash (2014), and Arrow
- Becomes president on Earth-1 after Dominators kill the previous (unnamed) president in 2016.
- Played by: Lucia Walters.

=== President Breckinridge ===
- President in: Megiddo: Omega Code 2
- Former Secretary of State to Presidents Richard Benson and David Alexander.
- Declares himself president when Alexander is framed for his father's murder.

=== President Henry Brendan ===
- President in: Falseface, by Marilyn Sharpe.
- Vice President to President Benjamin Riker, who is killed in a skiing accident which turns out to have been an assassination.
- President Brendan is targeted for assassination at a Shuttle Launch but is saved by a pair of spies.

=== President Howard Brewster ===
- President in: Line of Succession by Brian Garfield (1972 novel)
- Defeated for re-election by Clifford Fairlie.
- When Fairlie is abducted on a goodwill mission in Spain and Fairlie's vice president-elect is killed as a result of a terrorist bombing of the Senate, Brewster attempts to remain in office.
- The line of succession is restored by Vice President Elect Dexter Ethridge's decision to choose Congressman Andrew Bee as his vice president should Fairlie not be rescued.
- Party: Democratic

=== President Breyer ===
- President in: The Venture Bros.
- Exemplifies the worst qualities of George W. Bush, Bill Clinton, and Lyndon B. Johnson, according to the showrunners
- Played by Dana Snyder

=== President Bricker ===
- President in: The Man in the High Castle
- Succeeds Franklin D. Roosevelt as president
- Unable to revive economy during the Great Depression
- Is an isolationist

=== President Teddy Bridges ===
- President in: Commander-in-Chief
- Theodore "Teddy" Roosevelt Bridges is governor of California and vice president before becoming president. His vice president is Mackenzie Allen, who becomes the first female president after he dies.
- On his deathbed after brain surgery, he asks Allen to step aside in favor of a "more appropriate" successor. He later dies, and Allen succeeds him.
- Played by: Will Lyman
- Party: Republican

=== President Hawley Briggs ===
- President in: The Red President by Martin Gross
- Former U.S. Air Force general and senator from Arkansas.
- Is appointed vice president by President Jed Hankins.
- Becomes president when Hankins is assassinated by his pro-Soviet chief of staff.
- Forces the Soviets to back down during a crisis.
- Party: Democratic

=== President Bristol ===
- President in: I, Martha Adams, by Pauline Glen Winslow (novel)
- Former left-wing U.S. Senator.
- Is vice president during a Soviet nuclear attack that destroys U.S. Strategic Forces.
- Becomes president after the U.S. surrenders and President Carmody resigns.

=== President-elect Phil Bristol ===
- President in: Protect and Defend by Eric L. Harry
- Bristol is the governor of California who wins the presidency, but is assassinated by anarchists at the Willard Hotel prior to his inauguration. He is succeeded by Gordon Davis.
- Party: Republican

=== President Henry Parker Britland III ===
- President in: My Gal Sunday by Mary Higgins Clark
- Former U.S. senator from New Jersey.
- Is elected president at the age of 35 and serves two terms.
- After he leaves office, marries a reporter turned U.S. representative.

=== President Wyndom Brody ===
- President in: "Decompression" (The Outer Limits)
- As a senator, Brody wins the New Hampshire primary and is flying to South Carolina for the primary when he is approached by a visitor from the future calling for Brody to save himself by jumping from his aircraft.
- In an alternate universe, President Brody becomes a selfish tyrant, and is killed when he jumps from his aircraft over Columbia, South Carolina.
- Played by: Bruce Boxleitner

=== President Roy Bromwell ===
- President in: Rival Schools: United by Fate
- Shown in Roy's ending in the game as a flash forward set 20 years after the events of the game (where Roy is only in high school).
- Roy's high school classmate Tiffany is shown in the sequence as the First Lady.

=== President John Broward ===
- President in: the 2000 Twilight role-playing game.
- Former Governor of Arkansas who appoints himself to the U.S. Senate, and is elected president by them.
- World War Three breaks out in 1995, and on Thanksgiving Day 1997 nuclear strikes take place in the U.S. The president and those in line of succession are killed in the exchange.
- Broward takes office after congress regroups after the attack, but the U.S. military does not recognize the legality.

=== President Abraham Brown ===
- President in: The Music Master of Babylon by Edgar Pangborn (1954)
- In 2020, he successfully guides the country through the terrible experience of a Second Civil War, in the course of which nuclear weapons are used and large parts of New York City destroyed. He lives long enough to see the world devastated in "The Final War" of 2070. In the aftermath, Brown's hometown of Newburgh, New York, becomes the center of a short-lived "North American Soviet", whose members arrest Brown and torture him to death. After the fall of the regime, Brown is revered by survivors as "a martyr who gave his life for the people". Gradually, with few records left from before the worldwide destruction, Brown's memory is conflated with that of Jesus Christ as well as Abraham Lincoln and the Biblical Abraham, to create the divine figure of "Abraham" whose worship is the basis of "The Holy Murkan Church" in Pangborn's later novel Davy.

=== President Jennifer Brown ===
- President in the Y: The Last Man television series.
- Originally a US Congresswoman and chair of the House Intelligence Committee, after a cataclysmic event simultaneously killed all mammals with a Y chromosome except for her son Yorick Brown and his pet monkey Ampersand, she was elevated to president by being elected House Speaker (a position she held for an hour) after most of the presidential line of succession died (the sole known surviving member being disqualified due to being born outside of the United States).
- With the remnants of the US Government having to relocate to the Pentagon, her administration is occupied with the aftermath of the event, namely rioting, failing infrastructure, internal displacement, shortages and the Arizona state government being held hostage by a militia demanding an explanation for the die-off.
- A power struggle ensues when Regina Oliver, the Secretary of Veterans Affairs to deceased Republican President Ted Campbell, is found alive in an Israeli field hospital, believed to have been killed as a result of the die-off. Being the sole surviving eligible member of the previous presidential line of succession, Oliver is widely considered a 'fringe lunatic', with Yorick describing her as an 'anti-immigrant, anti-government, anti-vaxxer with a Twitter following' but is reinstated to her position in the Cabinet to placate her. A caucus of surviving Republican congresswomen, senators and other officials led by Kimberly Campbell Cunningham, President Campbell's politically active daughter, seek to reinstall a Republican administration and to restore a cis-male population (and, by extension, the patriarchy and basis of their previous influence), but are hesitant due to Oliver's fringe ideologies.
- To resolve the reproductive crisis, Brown secretly orders Culper Ring operative Agent 355 to bodyguard Yorick outside of the Pentagon and to locate geneticist Dr Allison Mann. After reported sightings of Yorick and suspicions of a conspiracy, Brown admits to and defends the cover-up when pressed by Oliver and Kimberly, losing support amongst the Cabinet as Agent 355 killed two pilots who had helped rescue Yorick from New York (viewed by the Cabinet as either being on Brown's direct orders or the actions of a rogue agent) and as Yorick is seemingly now outside of government control or protection.
- Shortly after Brown is removed from office, Yorick's ex-girlfriend Beth DeVille (who had rejected his offer of marriage just before the die-off) leads a raid on the Pentagon to take control of its amenities, accidentally shooting and killing the newly installed President Oliver in the process and allowing Brown to escape after learning that Yorick is still alive. However, Brown and DeVille along with Sam Jordan (a friend of Brown's daughter, Hero) are captured and detained by surviving members of the Culper Ring.
- In the original comic book series, Jennifer Brown was elevated to Secretary of the Interior after the Secretary of Agriculture Margaret Valentine (based on Ann Margaret Veneman) was sworn in as president. Brown originally served as the Representative for Ohio's 22nd district (which ceased to exist following the die-off), and was an anti-abortion Democrat.
- Party: Democratic.
- Played by: Diane Lane.

=== President Paul Buckingham ===
- President in: Deterrence
- Vice President Buchanan resigns during his term.
- Warns China against military action in 2007.
- Dies in office in October 2007, succeeded by appointed Vice President Walter Emerson.
- Played by: James Handy.

=== President Porter Brunreich ===
- President in: the Timeline Wars series by John Barnes.
- Porter Brunreich, an exceptionally intelligent and gifted ten-year-old girl, accompanies her mother and flees Pittsburgh to escape her abusive and violent father. She and her mother board a plane to Seattle. A war takes place across millions of alternate timelines. A slave society from an alternate timeline instructs terrorists under their control to stage a hostage crisis at Seattle Airport and kill Porter. Her mother saves her by sacrificing herself. Porter is deeply traumatized and guilt-ridden after seeing her mother die, and for some months lives on the city streets. She is adopted by Mark Strang, an agent of the Timeliners opposing the "Masters". As a teenager, she becomes a world class musician, and tours many countries. The attempts on her life continue: In Oslo, she kills two assailants with a gun; in Weimar, Porter and her companions are nearly killed, but manage to time travel to when Julius Caesar crossed the Rubicon and started his march to seize power in Rome. Porter fascinates Caesar by playing the Roman lyre and performing modern musical pieces on it. He tries to rape Porter, but her bodyguard Paula kills him. With great difficulty, Porter and her companions are brought to late 20th-century Europe. When she is elected, she informs the world about the war across the timelines. The world could not afford to remain disunited, divided into various countries acting at cross purposes.

=== Censor Bryan ===
- President in: A Different Flesh
- In an alternate timeline where Homo erectus (called "sims") and megafauna from the Pleistocene era survived in the Western Hemisphere, Britain's American colonies secede earlier in 1738 to form the Federated Commonwealths of America, the development of a British absolutist monarchy being cited as the main impetus. The constitution of the Federated Commonwealths is modelled more so on the Roman Republic than that of the real-life United States, with the country being governed by two chief executives who can veto each other. Censors serve a single non-renewable five-year term and serve as senators for life (alongside commonwealth governors) after leaving office.
- Serving as one of the two censors in 1988, Bryan calls for an investigation into the handling of a riot by sims' rights activists protesting the use of sims for HIV research. The investigation was vetoed by Bryan's opposite, Censor Jennings.

=== President John Robert Burgess ===
- President in: The Talbott Agreement by Richard M. Garvin and Edmond G. Addeo (1968 novel).
- Widower and former U.S. Senator from Pennsylvania.

=== President Cecily Burke ===
- President in: The First
- From the Midwestern United States.
- Presumably elected in 2032, and is stated to have lost Missouri during the election.
- In office in 2033 during the disastrous maiden voyage of Providence I, a planned mission to Mars, which explodes due to rocket malfunction.
- Attempts to remain neutral during the legislative debate to fund the Providence II mission, as the Providence Program was started in her predecessors administration.
- Is hounded by her opponents for wasteful spending towards NASA and private space company Vista during their lengthy preparations for the Providence II mission, threatening to have the Speaker of the House table a bill to freeze funding should they not speed up the process.
- After repairs to the Mars Ascent Vehicle fail, President Burke informs both NASA and Vista CEO Laz Ingram she will not be supporting the Providence II mission. However, the mission goes ahead when all the astronauts on the mission legally acknowledge the increased risks.
- Played by: Jeannie Berlin

=== President Rachel Burke ===
- President in: An Acceptable Loss
- She previously served as Vice President of the United States, where she helped develop the "Total Victory" strategy to fight the war on terror.
- During this time, she encourages and oversees a catastrophic nuclear strike on the city of Homs, Syria, known as Plan 712. The attack wiped out over 100,000 people but succeeded in killing the leaders of multiple international terrorist groups (including ISIS, Al-Queda, Hezbollah, Al-Nusra Front and Jaysh al-Sham), as well as a rogue scientist from the Atomic Energy Organization of Iran, who were meeting in the city to discuss strategy.
- Following the attack, Burke was later elected President and was running for re-election when she attempted to silence her former national security advisor Dr. Elizabeth Lamm from leaking controversial details of the operation's approval.
- Burke offers Lamm the position of United States Secretary of State, but she is rebuffed.
- Despite refusing to have Lamm assassinated, her White House Chief of Staff takes matters into his own hands and has Lamm killed by a parcel bomb.
- Played by: Jamie Lee Curtis

=== President Hugo Burlap ===
- President in: Whoops Apocalypse
- Former circus clown from Cleveland, Ohio.
- Dies in office after a reporter hits him in the stomach at President Burlap's request to show how fit he is.

=== President Burns ===
- President in: "Trial by Fire" (The Outer Limits)

=== President Clint Bushton ===
- President in: RollerCoaster Tycoon 3
- He is one of the five VIPeeps (Very Important Peeps) in the game.
- Name is derived from the surnames of George W. Bush and Bill Clinton.

=== President Burke ===
- President in: Modern Combat 4: Zero Hour
- Captured by Edward Page during a conference in Hawaii. Later rescued by Cpl. Blake and Extracted by Lt. Downs and Walker in a transport helicopter.
