= Daniel Knudsen =

American actor

- Born: 28 February 1988 (age 37); Dearborn, Michigan, U.S.
- Education: Thomas Edison State University
- Occupation(s): Director, actor, producer,
- Years active: 2005–present
- Website: www.danielknudsen.com

Daniel Knudsen (/kəˈnuːtsən/) is an American film director, actor and film producer. He is also a co-founder of Crystal Creek Media.

== Biography ==
Daniel Knudsen was born in Dearborn, Michigan. His father is a commercial airline pilot and his mother was a former saleswomen for Michigan Bell. In 2005 he began his involvement with movies and later went on to study digital media production in college. He graduated from Thomas Edison State University in 2009 and has worked in the film industry ever since.

=== Career ===
Kundsen began his career working as an intern on films while he was still in highschool. The first feature he directed was the thriller Creed of Gold. The film was nominated for an Adam Award for best feature drama at the Sabaoth International Film Festival in Milan, Italy and won a Redemptive Storyteller Award at the Redemptive Film Festival. Since then he has produced and directed other films including Indescribable, Christmas Grace, Courageous Love and Christmas Coupon. Many of Knudsen’s film projects feature a theme about hope surviving in adverse situations.

=== Lawsuit ===
Knudsen's Crystal Creek Media launched a lawsuit against Christian film company CMD Distribution for failing to fulfill its contractual financial obligations over the distribution of the movie Creed of Gold. In early 2017 Crystal Creek was awarded a judgment against CMD by the Superior Court of New Hanover County in the state of North Carolina.

=== Personal life ===
Knudsen is an avid carpenter and loves music. He stated in an interview that he sees Divinity as “the life force that animates all things.”

== Filmography ==
Director

- Late for Church (2007)
- Creed of Gold (2014)
- A Horse Called Bear (2015)
- Courageous Love (2017)
- Christmas Coupon (2019)
- SKYDOG (2020)
- Dinosaur Cove (film) (2022)
- Eternal Theater (2024)

Producer

- Late for Church (2007)
- Indescribable (2013)
- Unexpected Places (2013)
- Christmas Grace (2014)
- The King's Messengers (2017)
- Christmas Coupon (2019)
- SKYDOG (2020)
- Dinosaur Cove (film) (2022)

Actor

Year	Title	Role
2013	Unexpected Places	Mysterious Passenger
2014	Christmas Grace	Worship Leader
2014	Creed of Gold	Coffeehouse Barista
2015	A Horse Called Bear	Paramedic
2017	Courageous Love	Jason Kwilos
2017	The King's Messengers	David Sutherland
2019	Christmas Coupon	Chris McGill
2020	SKYDOG	Colt Lifestone
2022	Dinosaur Cove (film)	Terrance Walker
2024	Eternal Theater	Himself
