= The First of May (film) =

- Directed by: Paul Sirmons
- Written by: Gary Rogers; Gail Radley (novel)
- Produced by: Gary Rogers; Paul Sirmons
- Starring: Julie Harris; Charles Nelson Reilly; Robin O'Dell; Tom Nowicki; Joe DiMaggio; Dan Byrd; Mickey Rooney
- Cinematography: Stephen Campbell
- Music by: Tom Backus
- Distributed by: CMD Distribution
- Release date: 1998
- Running time: 111 minutes
- Country: United States
- Language: English

The First of May (also known as Two for the Show) is a 1998 independent film by Paul Sirmons and Gary Rogers, starring Dan Byrd, Julie Harris, Charles Nelson Reilly, Robin O'Dell, Tom Nowicki, Joe DiMaggio, and Mickey Rooney. It premiered on 12th October, 1998, in Buena Vista, Florida, at the FMPTA Annual Party. The film is based on the 1991 novel The Golden Days by Gail Radley. The circus people call Cory "the first of May" as it's their term for a newcomer.

It is notable for being the last film in which Joe DiMaggio appeared.

== Plot ==
Cory is a foster child who has come and gone from a series of foster homes and foster parents. He is sent to Dan and Michelle who wish to adopt him, but Cory is warned that he'll go to a home for delinquents if he has any more problems with his foster family.

Soon after his unenthusiastic arrival, Cory is forced to join a group of children to sing at an aged care facility. He meets Carlotta, a former circus worker and performer who is one of the residents. She is as indifferent as Cory; the two form a friendship that grows.

When Cory overhears that Michelle has at last fallen pregnant, he fears he will be sent to a delinquent home. Cory runs away and goes to Carlotta's facility to say goodbye. Carlotta insists Cory helps her escape; the pair run away to join the circus.

== Cast ==
- Dan Byrd as Cory
- Julie Harris as Carlotta
- Mickey Rooney as Boss Ed
- Charles Nelson Reilly as Dinghy
- Tom Nowicki as Dan
- Robin O'Dell as Michelle
- Gerard Christopher as Zack
- Mikki Scanlon as Loralie
- Joe DiMaggio as Joe

== Awards ==
- Dove Award (issued by The Dove Foundation)
- Kidsfirst! Best of the Fest Award
- Best of Fest Award (issued by the Chicago International Children's Film Festival)
- Best Film Award Feature Drama (issued by Burbank Film Festival)
- Best Film Awards Child Actor Performance (issued by Burbank Film Festival)
- Marcinek - Children's Jury Special Mention for a Movie and Special Mention by Professional Jury for Julie Harris as Foreign Actor at 18th Ale Kino! International Young Audience Film Festival
