= A Horse Called Bear =

- Promotional film poster
- Directed by: Daniel Knudsen
- Written by: Penny Carlisi
- Produced by: Penny Carlisi
- Starring: Nicholas Ryan Gibbs; Wayne E. Brown; Austin Farnsworth; Katelyn Grace Farnsworth; Allison Marie Farnsworth; Dawn Storey; Kristina Kaylen
- Music by: Samuel Joshua
- Production companies: Reveal Film Group; Spinel Entertainment; Crystal Creek Media; Mist Entertainment
- Distributed by: CMD Distribution
- Release date: May 26, 2015
- Running time: 91 minutes
- Country: United States
- Language: English

A Horse Called Bear is a 2015 American family drama film about recently orphaned boy who inherits a horse. It was produced by Penny Carlisi and directed by Daniel Knudsen. The film was awarded the Dove seal of family approval from the Dove Foundation and was released May 26, 2015.

== Plot ==
A Horse Called Bear tells the story of Ethan who inherits his mother's horse after she dies unexpectedly in a car accident. Being a city kid he has no desire to own a horse and tells the lawyer managing his mother's estate to sell it. The horse was purchased by one of the ranch hands to use as a training horse for young riders. Ethan then moves across the country to live with his grandparents. While living with them he learns that the horse is still kept nearby at his uncle's horse ranch. He is hired by his uncle and begins to work at the ranch with his mom's horse "Bear." During this time he falls in love with the horse and eventually buys it back.

== Cast ==
- Nicholas Ryan Gibbs as Ethan Riley
- Wayne E. Brown as Otto Brown
- Austin Farnsworth as Austin Baker
- Katelyn Grace Farnsworth as Katelyn Baker
- Allison Marie Farnsworth as Allison Baker
- Dawn Storey as Gloria Brown
- Kristina Kaylen as Rachel

Ryan-Iver Klann and Daniel Knudsen also appear in the film.

== Production ==
Principal photography for A Horse Called Bear took place in August and September 2013. Various locations in and around Howell, Michigan were used for filming.

== Release ==
A Horse Called Bear premiered at the Historic Howell Theater and was released on DVD May 26, 2015.

== Awards ==
The film was a semifinalist for "Best Feature Film" in the 2015 Christian Worldview Film Festival. The film was also part of the official selections at the 2015 International Christian Film Festival in Orlando, Florida.

== See also ==
- List of films about horses
