= Mauceri =

Mauceri is a surname. Notable people with the surname include:

- John Mauceri (born 1945), American conductor, producer, educator, and writer
- Patricia Mauceri (born 1950), American actress
