= Indescribable =

Indescribable may refer to:

- "Indescribable" (song), a song written and recorded by contemporary Christian singer-songwriter Laura Story and later also recorded by fellow Christian musician Chris Tomlin
- Indescribable (film), a film based on the events surrounding the writing of the hymn, "The Love of God"
- Indescribable, an American Thoroughbred racehorse and winner of the 2009 Kentucky Cup Distaff Stakes

== See also ==
- Indescribable cardinal, a term used in mathematics to describe a certain kind of large cardinal number that is hard to describe in some language Q
- The Indescribable Wow, the fifth (studio) album from American singer-songwriter Sam Phillips (record producer)
