= Unexpected Places =

Unexpected Places may refer to:

- Unexpected Places (2012 film), a film directed by Michael Brennan
- Unexpected Places (1918 film), an American silent comedy-drama film
- Unexpected Places (song), a song by The Academy Is...
