= Saving Grace (1986 film) =

1986 film by Robert M. Young

- Video release poster
- Directed by: Robert M. Young
- Written by: Robert M. Young; Richard Kramer; David S. Ward (as Joaquin Montana); Tom Conti
- Based on: "Saving Grace" by Celia Gittelson
- Produced by: Herbert F. Solow
- Starring: Tom Conti; Fernando Rey; Erland Josephson; Giancarlo Giannini; Donald Hewlett; Edward James Olmos; Patricia Mauceri; Marta Zoffoli
- Cinematography: Reynaldo Villalobos
- Edited by: Peter Zinner
- Music by: William Goldstein
- Production company: Embassy Pictures
- Distributed by: Columbia Pictures
- Release date: May 2, 1986
- Running time: 112 minutes
- Country: United States
- Language: English
- Box office: $18,209

Saving Grace is a 1986 comedy-drama film directed by Robert M. Young, produced by Herbert F. Solow, and starring Tom Conti, Giancarlo Giannini and Edward James Olmos. It is based on the eponymous novel by Celia Gittelson with screenplay by Richard Kramer and David S. Ward under a different name.

It was the last film to be distributed by Embassy Pictures.

The film was rediscovered after the election of Pope Leo XIV, who shares his papal name with the main character.

== Plot ==
Cardinal Giuseppe Bellini has been elected Pope Leo XIV. A year after his election, the youthful Pope longs to be involved in ordinary people's lives again, as he was when he was a priest. During an audience, the Pope communicates with a young deaf mute girl whose village has no priest. Accidentally locked out of the Vatican, the Pope travels to Montepetra, a small impoverished and demoralized village, his identity concealed by his beard growth. He realizes that the people need to rebuild a dilapidated aqueduct but, more importantly, that they must regain their community spirit and self-sufficiency. Without expertise and, initially, only the help of some street-wise orphans, he starts construction. All this is watched skeptically by a mysterious neighbour and opposed by local thugs led by Ciolino whose ill-gotten gains depend on the village remaining overly dependent on outsiders.

== Cast ==
- Tom Conti as Cardinal Giuseppe Bellini/Pope Leo XIV
- Fernando Rey as Cardinal Stefano Biondi
- Erland Josephson as Monsignor Francesco Ghezzi
- Giancarlo Giannini as Abalardi
- Donald Hewlett as Monsignor Colin McGee
- Edward James Olmos as Ciolino
- Patricia Mauceri as Lucia
- Marta Zoffoli as Isabella
- Guido Alberti as Cardinal Augusto Morante
- Massimo Sarchielli as Fortunato
- Massimo Serato as Monsignor Betti
- Margherita Horowitz as the nun interpreter
- Carlo Monni as the pizzeria owner

== Production and release ==
The movie was shot in Italy: in the cities of Rome, Mantua and the ghost town of Craco.

Saving Grace premiered in the United States on May 2, 1986, and in the Philippines on April 11, 1987.

== Critical reception ==
The film received mixed to positive reviews. Walter Goodman of The New York Times said, "There's no more engaging actor around than Tom Conti, but not even he, with the assistance of such notables of international moviedom as Giancarlo Giannini, Erland Josephson and Fernando Rey, can lift Saving Grace out of its slough of sentiment." Time Out wrote: "Despite a plot veiled in about as much mystery as an uncracked soft-boiled egg, Saving Grace does retain a certain Disneyesque charm as an innocent modern fable". Variety and TV Guide appreciated the cast and the direction, but expressed criticism about Conti's appearance considered too young for the part. TV Guide defined the movie as "a small but well-told parable that is perfect for family viewing".
