= CMD Distribution =

Christian film distribution company

- Company type: LLC
- Genre: Film distribution
- Founder: Byron M. Jones
- Headquarters: Wake Forest, North Carolina, United States
- Number of locations: United States, Brazil, Sri Lanka and South Africa
- Website: CMDDistribution.com

CMD Distribution is an American independent faith and family film distribution company, headquartered in Wake Forest, North Carolina. The company distributes, acquires and markets Christian and family-friendly films.

CMD Distribution has distributed films such as Creed of Gold and Two for the Show, known for starring Mickey Rooney and being the last film in which Joe Dimaggio appeared.

The company was forced to close after the Family Christian Stores filed for Chapter 11 Bankruptcy and the closer of Allegro

== Lawsuit ==
Crystal Creek Media launched a lawsuit against CMD Distribution for failing to fulfill its contractual financial obligations over the distribution of the movie Creed of Gold. In early 2017 Crystal Creek Media was awarded a judgment against CMD Distribution by the Superior Court of New Hanover County in the state of North Carolina.

Unfortunately, CMD was in the process of filing bankruptcy at the time due to the collapse of its biggest customer Allegro Media.

== Films ==
- Another Chance
- Creed of Gold
- Doonby
- Gibsonburg
- A Horse Called Bear
- Like a Country Song
- A Long Way Off
- Never Alone
- Quigley
- Two for the Show
- Unwanted Presence
- War Flowers
