= David Konstan =

American classicist and academic (1940–2024)

- Born: November 1, 1940
- Died: May 2, 2024 (aged 83)
- Occupations: Classicist; academic

Academic background
- Education: Columbia University (BA, MA, PhD)

(Jay) David Konstan (November 1, 1940 – May 2, 2024) was an American classicist and academic, known for his work on notions of emotion and beauty in the ancient world, as well as others on Latin poetry, Epicurean philosophy, the Greek novel, ancient ideas of friendship, and other topics. A Professor of Classics at NYU, he previously spent three decades teaching at Brown University, where he was John Rowe Workman Distinguished Professor Emeritus of Classics and Professor Emeritus of Comparative Literature.

Konstan received his B.A. (in mathematics), M.A., and Ph.D. (in Latin) degrees, all from Columbia University. In the Fall of 2016, Konstan was a Fellow at the Swedish Collegium for Advanced Study in Uppsala, Sweden.

Konstan died May 2, 2024, at the age of 83.

== Bibliography ==
One of his books has been reviewed in The Wall Street Journal.

Some of his books are:

- The Emotions of the Ancient Greeks: Studies in Aristotle and Classical Literature
- A Life Worthy of the Gods: The Materialist Psychology of Epicurus
- Before Forgiveness: The Origins of a Moral Idea
- Friendship in the Classical World
- Roman Comedy
- Sexual Symmetry: Love in the Ancient Novel and Related Genres
- Greek Comedy and Ideology
- Some Aspects of Epicurean Psychology
- Catullus' Indictment of Rome: The meaning of Catullus 64
