= Sheena Monnin =

American beauty pageant contestant (born 1985)

- Born: February 20, 1985 (age 41); United States
- Education: Master's degree in psychology
- Occupation: Business consultant
- Height: 5 ft 7 in (1.70 m)
- Beauty pageant titleholder
- Title: Miss Pennsylvania USA 2012 (Resigned)
- Hair color: Brunette
- Eye color: Brown
- Major competitions: Miss Florida Teen USA 2003; Miss Florida USA 2005 (Top 15); Miss Florida USA 2006; Miss Texas USA 2007 (Top 15); Miss Texas USA 2008; Miss Texas USA 2009; Miss Pennsylvania USA 2010 (1st Runner-Up); Miss Pennsylvania USA 2011 (1st Runner-Up); Miss Pennsylvania USA 2012 (Winner) (Resigned); Miss USA 2012 (Unplaced)

Sheena Monnin (born February 20, 1985) is an American former beauty pageant titleholder most widely known for the defamation suit brought against her by the Miss Universe Organization.

== Biography ==
Monnin was named Miss Pennsylvania USA 2012 and competed at the Miss USA 2012 pageant, though she failed to place.

Monnin was sued by Donald Trump for $5 million for calling the pageant "rigged." She alleged that the Miss Universe Organization had predetermined the results of the Miss USA 2012 pageant.

A default judgment was entered due to faulty legal advice from her lawyer, who failed to prepare for or attend the arbitration hearing. Monnin was told by her lawyer that she didn't need to attend the hearing. Because she failed to show up for court, the judge entered a default judgment against her for $5 million. She later sued her attorney and was able to recover expenses and also resolve the lawsuit.

== Miss USA 2012 controversy ==
In June 2012, Monnin said that another contestant, Karina Brez (as Miss Florida USA), saw the names of the top five on a telecast paper in the same order in which they were later called out. Brez later said she had made her comment jokingly. Brez went on to then say that she made the whole thing up, changing her story more than once. Monnin stepped down when what she said were those same contestants were named to the Top 5. Fox News reported an unnamed second contestant had confirmed Monnin's account: "I thought it might be because she didn't make the top 15 cut, but at that point [Monnin] was able to reveal to me at least four of the five names who went on to be the top girls. She couldn't remember the fifth because she was so upset"

On the night of the Miss USA awards, Monnin made a Facebook post resigning her position:

I have decided to resign my position as Miss Pennsylvania USA 2012. Effective immediately I have voluntarily, completely, and utterly removed myself from the Miss Universe Organization. In good conscience I can no longer be affiliated in any way with an organization I consider to be fraudulent, lacking in morals, inconsistent, and in many ways trashy.

I do not support this system in any way. In my heart I believe in honesty, fair play, a fair opportunity, and high moral integrity, none of which in my opinion are part of this pageant system any longer.

Thank you all for your support and understanding as I walk a road I never dreamed I’d need to walk, as I take a stand I never dreamed I’d need to take. After 10 years of competing in a pageant system I once believed in, I now completely and irrevocably separate myself in every way and on every level from the Miss Universe Organization. I remove my support completely and have turned in the title of Miss Pennsylvania USA 2012.

Immediately following Monnin's resignation, The Trump Organization publicly denied Monnin's allegations. In an interview with Good Morning America (ABC News), Donald Trump accused her of "loser's remorse", saying "She lost and if you look at her compared to the people who were in the top 15, you would understand why she's not in the top 15. It's a very, very sad situation." He went on to defend the honesty of the final round judging: "Ernst & Young is one of the great, respected accounting firms. They do the tabulation. It's not like we care who the final contestants are. You take the 16 and you go down to 10 to five and then you have a winner and then it's all tabulated. The judges are all celebrities and they make their pick and that's the end of it."

The pageant organizers initiated an arbitration proceeding against Monnin for defamation and damages, arguing that they lost a $5 million BP sponsorship and reputation because of her allegations. Monnin refused to renounce her claims. In the December 30, 2012 default judgment, an arbitrator ruled that she must pay the pageant organization $5 million for direct damages, but did not award the other demands of the organizers.

According to an interview with Monnin's father by The Daily Beast, the other demands included that Monnin remove from her Facebook page all references to Trump or the pageant. He said that when he conveyed the message she would not remove the material, Michael Cohen "threw a fit on the phone. He basically said if I went along with my daughter I was an idiot. And said that she should apologize and if she didn’t want to, then ‘Game on,’ and he slammed the phone down. And that was the end of the conversation."

On July 2, 2013, Federal Judge J. Paul Oetken upheld the decision that Monnin must pay Donald Trump and the Miss USA pageant for direct damages caused by calling the pageant "fraudulent". The decision was based on the legal principle that arbitrations are rarely voided.

A November 4, 2013 lawsuit against her prior lawyer was reported by TMZ to have been settled for "somewhere north of a million bucks", and a deal was made to settle with Trump for "more than a million bucks". Her father told The Daily Beast that she "no longer speaks publicly about the lawsuit." and "She’s fine. She’s moved on with her life. She’s not had to rescind what she said." The Beast noted that the judgment "was satisfied in August 2014", and speculated that she might be under a gag order as part of the deal.

Jeff Lee, a judge for Miss Universe, later told GQ that since 2005, Donald Trump would pick as many as six semifinalists to go on to the final round, allegedly in response to the failure of Oleksandra Nikolayenko to progress in 2004. GQ reported that "the international finals are rigorously judged" but described "massaging" at lower stages, quoting Anya Ayoung-Chee (2008 Miss Trinidad and Tobago) who said "You kind of know the thing is fixed and predetermined. Still, you make the most of it and just make sure people recognize you anyway."

Preceded by Amber-Joi Watkins	Miss Pennsylvania USA (Resigned); 2012	Succeeded by Jessica Billings
