= Unexpected Places (2012 film) =

- Directed by: Michael Brennan
- Written by: Penny Carlisi
- Produced by: Penny Carlisi; Daniel Knudsen
- Starring: Penny Carlisi; Tim Torok; Wayne E. Brown
- Cinematography: Megan Farnsworth
- Music by: Samuel Joshua
- Production companies: Reveal Film Group; Crystal Creek Media
- Release date: December 1, 2012
- Running time: 112 minutes
- Country: United States
- Language: English

Unexpected Places is a 2012 film produced by Reveal Film Group in association with Crystal Creek Media. The film is a redemption story of a wayward son played by Tim Torok. It was directed by Michael Brennan, while being co-produced, written-by and starring Penny Carlisi.

== Plot ==
Cody is a troubled son who continues to make bad choices into his adult life. His mother (Pam) feels unbearable grief as she watches him grow up. Cody struggles with addiction and crime while Pam is hurt by all the relationships in her life including her marriage. Her faith is shaken and she feels more alone than ever, but God intervenes to open both their eyes to redemption and a new life.

== Cast ==
- Penny Carlisi as Pam
- Tim Torok as Cody Farmer
- Wayne E. Brown as Alan
- Deputy M. Young as himself

Daniel Knudsen makes a cameo appearance.

== Production ==
Unexpected Places was filmed on location in the Milford, Brighton, and Howell area with an all-volunteer cast and crew. Eleven scenes were shot at Brighton Nazarene Church, and four scenes took place at the Livingston County Jail. An actual Livingston County Sheriff Deputy plays the role, and does the stunt driving. Principal photography took place for four months throughout 2011.

== Release ==
Unexpected Places premiered December 1, 2012 in Brighton, Michigan. There is an additional parallel novel written by Michael Brennan being released, plus a soundtrack CD of the film by Samuel Joshua. It was released to home video on July 2, 2013.
