= Patricia Mauceri =

American actress

- Occupation: Actress
- Years active: 1976–present
- Website: www.patriciamauceri.com

Patricia Mauceri is an American actress. She is best known for playing the role of Carlotta Vega on the ABC soap opera, One Life to Live.

== Early life and career ==
Mauceri played Angie Perrini Frame on Another World in 1977. She has had small roles in films such as Saving Grace and Die Hard with a Vengeance, and appeared in television shows such as Law & Order and The Sopranos.

Mauceri portrayed Carlotta Vega on the ABC soap opera, One Life to Live from 1995 until March 25, 2009. She was reportedly replaced in the role after voicing personal religious objections to a planned storyline in which Carlotta would be supportive of a gay relationship.

Mauceri has served on the theatre faculty of the MasterWorks Festival since 2005.

A short documentary about Mauceri was filmed by Olive Tree Pictures. In 2017 she portrayed Jenny Sanchez in the faith-based movie Courageous Love.

== Filmography ==
=== Film ===
Year	Title	Role	Notes
1979	Natural Enemies	Girl in Brothel	
1986	Saving Grace	Lucia	
1994	Don Juan DeMarco	Doña Querida	
1995	Die Hard with a Vengeance	Miss Thomas	
1997	I Think I Do	Ms. Rivera	
1998	Went to Coney Island on a Mission from God... Be Back by Five	Mrs. Muñoz	
2001	Jump Tomorrow	Consuelo	
2001	Don't Say a Word	Sofia	
2006	Freedomland	Judge	
2017	Courageous Love	Jenny Sanchez	
2017	Longing	—N/a	Short film
2018	The Farmer and the Belle	Maria	Filming

=== Television ===
Year	Title	Role	Notes
1976	Kojak	Yolanda	Episode: "Where Do You Go When You Have Nowhere to Go?"
1977	Another World	Angie Perrini Frame	
1980	As the World Turns	Andrea Andropolous	
1990	The Baby-Sitters Club	Mrs. Stewart	Episode: "Dawn and the Dream Boy"
1991	Law & Order	Mrs. Fermi	Episode: "Out of Control"
1994	Ghostwriter	Mrs. Michaels	Episode: "What's Up with Alex?: Part 1"
1994	Lifestories: Families in Crisis	Lourdes	Episode: "POWER: The Eddie Matos Story"
1995–2009	One Life to Live	Carlotta Vega	Recurring role
1997	Law & Order	Virginia Watts	Episode: "We Like Mike"
1999	Now and Again	Realtor #1	Episode: "One for the Money"
2000	Law & Order	Belinda Rojas	Episode: "Vaya Con Dios"
2001	Law & Order	Female Friend	Episode: "Soldier of Fortune"
2001	100 Centre Street		Episode: "The Bug"
2001	The Sopranos	Marie	Episode: "Army of One"
2001	Boss of Bosses	Nina Castellano	TV film
2004	Rescue Me	Franco's Mom	Episode: "Revenge"
2005	Law & Order: Trial by Jury	Judge Francesco Caruso	Episode: "The Abominable Showman"
2009	Royal Pains	Benny's Mom	Episode: "Strategic Planning"
2021-2023	Manifest (TV series)	Director Zimmer	8 episodes
