= Matthew Glass =

Matthew Glass is the pseudonym of an Australian-born author and doctor who is living and working in Britain.

He is the author of Ultimatum (2009); End Game (2012); and Fishbowl (2015).

His novels are noted for their complex and hyper-realistic depiction of international relations, especially with regard to diplomacy and economics.

Ultimatum is an eco-thriller set in the years 2032 and 2033.

End Game is a geopolitical thriller set in 2018. It was re-released with the name Trigger Point in March 2012.

Fishbowl is a social-networking thriller set in the early 21st century. The social network in Fishbowl is clearly inspired by Facebook but works with AI-generated avatars that can be used by corporations for user-targeted selling.

== Bibliography ==
- Glass, Matthew, Ultimatum. 2009. Atlantic Monthly Press, New York. (ISBN 0-8021-1888-7).
- Glass, Matthew, End Game. 2010. Corvus. (ISBN 9781848877740).
- Glass, Matthew, Trigger Point. 2012. Atlantic Monthly Press, New York. (ISBN 0-8021-1997-2)
