= Creed of Gold =

- Promotional film poster
- Directed by: Daniel Knudsen
- Written by: Mark A. Knudsen
- Produced by: Mark A. Knudsen; Michelle Knudsen
- Starring: Taylor Lindsey; Ellen Lawrence; Nicholas Willeke; Vanessa Ewing; Alexander Ganahl; William Greene; Dr. Jay L. Wile
- Cinematography: Stephen Higginbotham
- Music by: Samuel Joshua
- Production company: Crystal Creek Media
- Distributed by: Crystal Creek Media
- Release date: August 12, 2014
- Running time: 102 minutes
- Country: United States
- Language: English

Creed of Gold is a 2014 film about fictional corruption at the Federal Reserve. It was produced by Crystal Creek Media and directed by Daniel Knudsen. Filming of Creed of Gold took place in several locations near Indianapolis, Indiana and Detroit, Michigan with some additional photography taking place on location in New York City.

== Plot ==
Creed of Gold begins with a flashback during the Bolshevik revolution in Russia. A reporter hides a list with names of powerful bankers who financed the revolution. The list is discovered seventy years later by a Russian history professor. The professor's son Adam eventually inherits the list and begins to research the names on it. Adam Smith is an incoming freshman at a fictional American school called Havenhurst University. In his Money & Banking class he is assigned to work on a term paper with Kirsten Stanford. Kirsten is a wealthy girl from upstate New York and her father is on the board of governors of the Federal Reserve. The two do not see eye to eye but eventually work things out and begin researching together. Their work is being thwarted by a greedy Federal Reserve board member named Stuart Wornwall. Wornwall is secretly stealing money from the Federal Reserve Bank of New York by programing the computer system to misappropriate funds every time the Federal Reserve buys and sells bonds from the US Government. Adam and Kirsten uncover Wornwall's family history through the list. This discovery links Wornwall's family fortune back to the offenses committed during the Bolshevik revolution.

The film was released August 12, 2014.

== Cast ==
- Taylor Lindsey as Adam Smith
- Ellen Lawrence as Kirsten Stanford
- Nicholas Willeke as Cody Williams
- Vanessa Ewing as Jenell Slone
- Alexander Ganahl as Byron Tackitt
- William Greene as Stuart Wornwall
- Dr. Jay L. Wile as Gerald Steinberg
- Sehul Viras as Wornwall's Hitman
- Michael Meyer as Mr. Stanford
- Amy Meyer as Mrs. Stanford

== Production ==
Principal photography began June 10, 2010 and ended July 12, 2010. Various locations near Indianapolis, Indiana were used for filming, including the Indiana World War Memorial Plaza, Taylor University, the Columbia Club and the Indianapolis Union Station. The Indiana State House doubled as the interior of the Federal Reserve Bank of New York.

The film took three years to complete and secure international distribution. The movie trailer was released by Crystal Creek Media on June 29, 2012.

== Themes ==
The main theme is that certain actions may escape the boundaries of International law but they are still wrong because they are a violation of Natural law. Ron Paul's campaign advisor Doug Wead has a special feature on the DVD about what is going on with the Federal Reserve and its impact on American citizens and the rest of the world.

Though the film deals with complex topics it was awarded the Dove seal of family approval from the Dove Foundation.

On some movie posters created after the film's release, Creed of Gold's tagline is shown as "Where we go one we go all," which is a phrase used as a slogan by the QAnon political conspiracy theory movement.

== Release ==
Creed of Gold premiered in Indianapolis, Indiana and was released August 12, 2014.

== Awards ==
The film was nominated for an Adam Award for best feature drama at the Sabaoth International Film Festival in Milan, Italy and won a Redemptive Storyteller Award at the Redemptive Film Festival.

== See also ==
- October Revolution
