= Courageous Love =

- Promotional film poster
- Directed by: Daniel Knudsen
- Written by: Mark A. Knudsen
- Produced by: Mark A. Knudsen; Michelle Knudsen; Penny Carlisi; Tim Kaiser
- Starring: Jared Withrow; Jessica Koloian; Kristina Kaylen; Patricia Mauceri
- Music by: Bryan Atkinson
- Production company: Crystal Creek Media
- Distributed by: Crystal Creek Media; Pure Flix Entertainment
- Release date: February 14, 2017
- Running time: 100 minutes
- Country: United States
- Language: English

Courageous Love is a romantic drama film about a newly appointed engineering company president who falls in love with one of his employees while working undercover at a different branch office. It was produced by Crystal Creek Media and directed by Daniel Knudsen. Filming of Courageous Love took place in the summer of 2014 near Detroit, Michigan, with some additional photography taking place on location in New York City.

== Plot ==
Courageous Love is about a young man named Alex Shelby who is appointed president of his father's company Shelby Engineering shortly after his parents are tragically killed. At the annual company banquet a server accidentally pours punch all over Alex. He then goes to the kitchen and puts on an apron to cover up the spill. After that he begins helping the cooks with the event instead of attending as the newly appointed president. The company is floundering financially as new building contracts dry up. Under pressure Alex signs an unwise contract landing him in a situation to finish a building on a very tight deadline. A purchase order mix-up causes the building to be delayed due to the delivery of wrong materials. Michelle Long, who is the head of purchasing at the Manhattan branch of Shelby's company, takes the fall for this delay. When Alex comes to Manhattan to work things out at the downtown office, Michelle remembers him as the caterer from the banquet. On the spur of the moment, Alex tells her that he is a new employee at this office. He then works undercover to figure out what went wrong with the building project. While working undercover as a graphic designer, Alex and Michelle fall in love. Alex is forced to make tough decisions when he has to choose between saving his company or his relationship with Michelle.

== Cast ==
- Jared Withrow as Alex Shelby
- Jessica Koloian as Michelle Long
- Kristina Kaylen as Kayla Long
- Patricia Mauceri as Jenny Sánchez
- Tim Kaiser as John Grame
- Holly Houk as Julie Shelby
- Michael Tremblay as Darren Chambers
- Nathan Jacobson as Clay Dorcette
- Kurt Hierholzer as Ron
- Greg Wolfe as Storman
- Daniel Knudsen as Jason Kwilos

== Production ==
Principal photography for Courageous Love took place in June 2014. Various locations in and around the Detroit, Michigan, area were used for filming. This movie is actress Patricia Mauceri's first film performance since her role of Carlotta Vega on the ABC soap opera, One Life to Live.

== Release ==
Courageous Love premiered at Emagine Novi and will release February 14, 2017. Crystal Creek Media is partnering with Pure Flix Entertainment for a streaming release on the PureFlix platform. The movie was originally titled “Rather to be Chosen” but was changed to “Courageous Love” shortly before the wide release of the film. The Dove seal of family approval was awarded to Courageous Love by the Dove Foundation.

== Awards ==
Courageous Love was featured at the 2017 Winnipeg Film Festival along with Queen of Katwe and Star Wars: The Force Awakens. Courageous Love won the audience choice award for Best Independent Feature. The film was also an official selection at the 2016 Christian Worldview Film Festival.
