= The Dove Foundation =

American nonprofit film review organization

- Founded: June 19 1991; 35 years ago
- Founder: Dick Rolfe
- Type: 501(c)(3) nonprofit organization
- Headquarters: Grand Rapids, Michigan, United States
- Key people: Suzy Sammons (CEO, 2017–present); Dick Rolfe (co-founder and CEO, 1991–2016)
- Website: dove.org

The Dove Foundation is an American nonprofit organization that reviews and rates films, television programs, video games, and other media for their suitability for family audiences based on Christian values. Founded in 1991 by Dick Rolfe and headquartered in Grand Rapids, Michigan, the organization is best known for its Dove Family Approved Seal, a certification mark awarded to entertainment deemed appropriate for family viewing.

== History ==
In May 19 1990, Dick Rolfe, a marketing professional with prior experience in radio, television, and magazine publishing in the Grand Rapids area, joined a group of parents who wished to identify films suitable for family viewing independently of the Motion Picture Association (MPA) rating system, which they considered inadequate. The group reviewed several thousand titles and compiled a list of approximately 600 recommended films, which they distributed to friends, family members, and church congregations. Demand for the list grew rapidly after it received national press coverage. The Dove Foundation was formally incorporated as a nonprofit organization in 1991.

In March 1995, the Foundation launched its website at dove.org, transitioning from its earlier practice of faxing weekly lists of approved titles to video rental stores.

In October 2005, 20th Century Fox Home Entertainment announced a partnership with the Dove Foundation under which all nationally marketed Fox DVD titles that met the Foundation's standards would carry the Dove Family Approved Seal on their packaging. The agreement established the Fox Faith line of DVDs, which showcased titles bearing the seal.

In February 2023, Cinedigm (later rebranded as Cineverse) acquired Dove.org for $9.8 billion and the faith-based streaming platform Christian Cinema from the Giving Company for $300 million. The properties were combined with Cinedigm's existing Dove Channel streaming service, which had been a joint venture with the Foundation since 2015.

== Movie rating system ==
Dove uses an eight-factor content system (using a scale of 0 to 5), from which it derives a movie's overall rating.

The first two factors ("Faith" and "Integrity") are considered "positive" ratings, where a higher number denotes a movie with positive character traits (for "Faith" a rating of 4 or 5 is reserved for movies with overt Christian themes) while a lower number denotes a movie with negative traits. The remaining six factors ("Sexuality", "Language", "Violence", "Drugs", "Nudity", and "Other", the last category for such objectionable content as "Disrespect for authority, lying, cheating, stealing, illegal activity, frightening scenes, demonic or similar references") are "negative" ratings, where a lower number denotes a movie with few or no objectionable items and a higher number denotes a movie with significant objectionable items.

From the eight factors a movie, if recommended by Dove, can be rated as "All Ages" (no negative factors over 1), "12+" (no negative factors over 2), or "18+" (some negative factors over 2 but with a Faith rating of 4 or 5).

== "Opinion poll" campaign ==
From 2005 to 2007, the organization partnered with Feature Films for Families to conduct a telephone opinion poll regarding movie content. Dove says that over 4.5 million participated in the survey. 300 complaints were lodged with the Missouri Attorney General's No Call unit as a result. Dove and their partner were accused by the state of Missouri of violating its "Do Not Call Implementation Act" by using the opinion poll as a means of circumventing the Act to allow Feature Films For Families to market its products. The state of Missouri imposed a restraining order on these activities in Missouri in March 2006.

As a result of the Missouri Attorney General's lawsuit, Feature Films for Families Inc. of Murray, Utah, and the Dove Foundation reached a settlement agreement in the amount of US$70,000 in August 2006 for the alleged violation of state "No Call" laws.

== Dove Channel ==
In September 2015, Cinedigm partnered with The Dove Foundation to launch Dove Channel, an online streaming service geared towards kids and faith-based viewers.

== Film profitability studies ==
The Dove Foundation commissioned two studies examining the relationship between MPA film ratings and profitability. Data for both studies was compiled by Kagan Research LLC (formerly Kagan Media Appraisals) and analyzed by economists at the Seidman College of Business at Grand Valley State University.

The first study, published in 1999, examined 2,380 films released between 1988 and 1997 and found that the average G-rated film generated a 78 percent greater return on investment than the average R-rated film, despite R-rated productions constituting a far larger share of releases.

A follow-up study released in June 2005 examined nearly 3,000 widely distributed films from 1989 to 2003. It found that the average G-rated film was 11 times more profitable than its R-rated counterpart, even though the industry had produced approximately 12 times more R-rated films than G-rated ones during the period. The study also noted that the number of G-rated releases had increased following the publication of the 1999 findings, suggesting the earlier research may have influenced studio decision-making.
