= List of fictional United States presidencies of historical figures (P–R) =

Lists of fictional presidents of the United States
A–B	C–D	E–F
G–H	I–J	K–M
N–R	S–T	U–Z
Fictional presidencies of historical figures
A–B	C–D	E–G
H–J	K–L	M–O
P–R	S–U	V–Z

The following is a list of real or historical people who have been portrayed as President of the United States in fiction, although they did not hold the office in real life. This is done either as an alternate history scenario, or occasionally for humorous purposes. Also included are actual US presidents with a fictional presidency at a different time and/or under different circumstances than the one in actual history.

== P ==
=== Sarah Palin ===
- In the time travel-themed card game Chrononauts, specifically the 2009 expansion pack The Gore Years, the player can cause Sarah Palin to become the first female President in 2008. This is a consequence of Al Gore winning the 2000 presidential election, as John McCain is the Republican nominee for 2004 and he selects Palin as his running mate (mirroring McCain's actual decision in 2008). This raises Palin's national profile enough to win the Republican primaries of 2008, before narrowly prevailing over Vice President Joe Lieberman in the general election.

=== Nancy Pelosi ===
- In the comic series The Boys, created by Garth Ennis and Darick Robertson, after Victor K. "Vic the Veep" Neuman, formerly Vice President to Robert "Dakota Bob" Shaefer, was killed by Homelander as part of his ultimately unsuccessful coup against the United States in issue #65, House Speaker Nancy Pelosi became Acting President in issue #66, serving until after the 2008 elections.

=== Mike Pence ===
- In a flashback episode of the Fox post-apocalyptic series The Last Man on Earth, Mike Pence is mentioned in news broadcasts as being the 46th President of the United States. During his presidency he creates the Federal Pandemic Agency in a last-ditch attempt to prevent the spread of the mysterious deadly virus sweeping across the planet. However, Pence himself eventually succumbs to the virus, and his entire line of succession is quickly eliminated by the virus along with nearly everyone else on earth.
- President in the television series Years and Years. Mike Pence wins the 2024 U.S. presidential election, succeeding Donald Trump after he won re-election in 2020. He becomes president at a time of heightened tensions with China, after President Trump authorized a nuclear strike against the Chinese artificial island Hong Sha Dao days before Pence had entered office. During his presidency the U.S. faces international sanctions after the nuclear attack, and the United Nations threaten to withdraw their headquarters from New York. Former President Trump is mentioned as still holding some influence in the Pence administration, with Pence being regarded as a puppet. Due to being isolated on the world stage, the U.S. and the Republican Party drift further to the right, with Roe v. Wade and Obergefell v. Hodges both being overturned and the speaking of Spanish being banned in public spaces by 2027 (in addition to Trump's likeness being carved into Mount Rushmore).
- In the anthology And the Last Trump Shall Sound by Harry Turtledove, James K. Morrow and Cat Rambo, Mike Pence succeeded Donald Trump as president in 2024 after his death during a second coronavirus pandemic. During his presidency, Roe v. Wade was overturned in 2026 with abortion being criminalized and thousands of women dying as a result of illegal procedures; concentration camps were established near the US-Mexican border to imprison migrants, illegal immigrants and political opponents; non-Christians including Jews, Muslims and Sikhs fell victim to fatal religious and racist attacks; and LGBTQ+ peoples were persecuted and eventually classified as sex offenders. Congress became a Republican-dominated rubber stamp, state autonomy in Democratic states was undermined with state governments being removed and replaced with right-wing puppets for non-compliance with federal orders, Christian fundamentalism was endorsed by the federal government, and news broadcasters including CNN and MSNBC became right-wing subsidiaries of Fox as part of restrictions on freedom of the press. Pence's vice president was Lindsey Graham. In The Breaking of Nations by Harry Turtledove, Pence unsuccessfully opposed the secession of the West Coast states of California, Washington and Oregon as Pacifica and the northeastern states of New York, New Jersey, Connecticut, Maine, Massachusetts, New Hampshire, Rhode Island and Vermont as Newtopia, the last states to be controlled by Democrats. And in The Purloined Republic by James Morrow, Pence managed to serve a third term as president by serving as Devin Nunes's running mate in 2032, whereupon Nunes resigned the presidency to allow Pence to succeed him, either sidestepping or manipulating the Twenty-second Amendment. Rick Santorum was appointed as his new Vice President. Pacifican porn star Polly Nightingale attempted to sabotage Pence's presidency by impersonating his spiritual advisor.

=== Frederic Courtland Penfield ===
In The Land Leviathan by Michael Moorcock Frederic Courtland Penfield becomes a nominal 'president' over a de facto, skeletal 'United States', in Washington, D.C. – in an alternate history world devastated by titanic wars and with the US having turned to violent racism an re-introduced Black Slavery. Penfield's capital has been surprisingly immune from bombing and missile attack, as the government had fled into subterranean shelters at the beginning of the Great War. Penfield's rule is challenged by rebellious Black slaves led by Paul Robeson.

=== Frances Perkins ===
In Amerika Strikes Back! by Paul Lally, on December 8, 1941, Nazi Germany reveals its possession of secretly developed nuclear weapons, destroying Washington D.C. and Manhattan in a sudden devastating attack. President Roosevelt and most of his cabinet perish, along with Congress and the Supreme Court. With the federal government effectively decapitated, the US is thrown into chaos, each state acting on its own. Secretary of Labor Frances Perkins, sole survivor of the Executive Branch, is sworn as the first female President – an honor which she would have greatly liked to avoid. Germany threatens further attacks which would destroy Chicago, Miami, Pittsburgh and other major American cities. President Perkins has no choice but to give in and sign a Pact of Neutrality, the US obliging itself to stand aside as the Nazis take over the rest of the world. However, with President Perkins' tacit support General George Patton puts together an underground group called the "Sons of Liberty" and formulates a daring and desperate plot which may yet save something from the jaws of this colossal defeat.

=== Ross Perot ===
- Perot is president in the cartoon Eek! The Cat and voiced by Charlie Adler.
- In the Smiling Friends episode "Mr. President", main character Pim Pimling cites President Ross Perot as having won the 1996 United States presidential election as an example of an upset in the United States' political history.

=== George S. Patton ===
- President Patton, presumably George S., is mentioned in The Number of the Beast by Robert A. Heinlein. In reading an almanac from our universe, it is noted that Dwight D. Eisenhower served two terms but only one of them corresponded with his terms in the parallel universe, meaning that he either served from 1949 to 1957 or 1957–1965.
- In the novel Patton's Spaceship (part of the Timeline Wars series by John Barnes), General George Patton was one of the American commanders who in 1945 valiantly resisted the invading armies which Nazi Germany sent across the Atlantic, but were overwhelmed. After being defeated by Rommel's armored columns at the Second Battle of Gettysburg, Patton led the remnants of his forces in a fighting retreat all the way to the West Coast and embarked them on boats across the Pacific, meeting in Australia with Field Marshal Montgomery at the head of surviving British troops. The Nazis proceeded to establish a collaborator Nazi regime in the US, which between 1952 and 1960 murdered no less than 14,000,000 American citizens. A further German attack overwhelmed Australia, New Zealand and the Philippines, but Patton and other exile generals managed to hold together the Free Zone in much of East Asia, where all who continued to resist the Nazis congregated – Americans, British, Soviets, Chinese, French, Jews, Blacks and numerous other nationalities and ethnic groups – together with the country's own Vietnamese population. Hanoi became the political and military headquarters of the Free Zone, where Patton established a strong working partnership and personal friendship with the Vietnamese General Giap, while keeping contact by submarine with the anti-Nazi Resistance active in the US and other countries. In 1961 the Free Zone seemed on the verge of defeat, with a heavy German invasion sowing destruction at Singapore, one of its main bases, and the Germans deploying devastating new technologies. However, Edward Teller had been building up a secret Nuclear Program, based at the village of Điện Biên Phủ, while Wernher von Braun – who defected from the Nazis and came over to Patton's side – developed Intercontinental Ballistic Missiles. The Nazi spy satellite, launched from Cape Canavral, discovered the base and the Nazis launched a heavy attack on Điện Biên Phủ and were beaten off with difficulty. However, Teller obtained an unexpected plentiful source of Plutonium, making it possible for the Free Zone to launch its deadly surprise in the last moment before the Nazis could fully bring their own new weapons into play. ICBMs shot from Vietanam, loaded with hydrogen bombs, traveled around the world, destroyed Berlin and turned Germany into a radioactive wasteland. With the Nazis destroyed, their dependent Fascist regimes in various countries collapsed and underground groups took power. Patton, leading his forces to retake the United States, declared he would not use nuclear arms on American soil, but was intransigent in insisting that the 18,000,000 members of the American Nazi Party "would never be allowed to vote, hold office or own property" and that their properties would be handed to Blacks who had been re-enslaved under the Nazi regime. This stiffened the American Nazis' resolve not to surrender, but in a whirlwind campaign Patton utterly defeated the American Nazi army within less than a hundred days of his landing. A year later Patton won the first free elections and became president, defeating the opposing candidate John F. Kennedy who had been the captain of a Free Zone submarine.

=== William Dudley Pelley ===
- President in the Reich-5 timeline of GURPS Infinite Worlds. In this timeline Giuseppe Zangara succeeded in assassinating Franklin Delano Roosevelt in 1933. His successors Garner, Lindbergh and Wallace proved unable to handle the Great Depression, and America stood by while Hitler conquered Europe and Japan took over most of Asia, Australia, New Zealand, and Oceania. In 1944 Japan attacked Guam, the Philippines and Hawaii; in the ensuing chaos the far-right William Dudley Pelley was able to get elected president. Pelley quickly assumed dictatorial powers, and his blatant theft of the 1948 election from Robert A. Taft triggered wholesale civil war. The president called for aid from Nazi Germany, which quickly sent 40 Wehrmacht divisions through Canada. The pro-democracy resistance collapsed after Werner Heisenberg developed the atomic bomb which was used on four American cities in 1950. A second attempt at rebellion in 1976 failed, and America ended up as a (very) junior partner of the World-Axis that dominates the planet and seeks to conquer other timelines.

=== Colin Powell ===
- Colin Powell is president of a post-Communist United States in Kim Newman and Eugene Byrne's Back in the USSA, serving as a parallel to Boris Yeltsin.
- Powell is also mentioned to have been president in an episode of SeaQuest 2032.
- Powell was also mentioned as having been president in the 2000 movie Deterrence set in the then future year 2008. An aircraft carrier had been named after him, and he was mentioned to have taken heroic action in a crisis involving Venezuela.

=== Elvis Presley ===
- In a parallel universe featured in the Lois & Clark: The New Adventures of Superman Season Two episode "Tempus, Anyone?", Presley had been president prior to 1996, at which time he was still alive.
- In the short story That'll Be the Day by Jack C. Haldeman and Barbara Delaplace in the alternate history novel Alternate Tyrants edited by Mike Resnick, an amendment to the US constitution lowers the voting age and America's youth elects Elvis Presley for president. As president, he establishes an ageist dictatorship, bans all types of music except for rock 'n roll, and fosters an unstable political system violently dominated by musicians.
- In the short story Them Old Hyannis Blues by Judith Tarr contained in the anthology Alternate Kennedys edited by Mike Resnick, Elvis Presley is the President of the United States while John F. Kennedy and his brothers are famous rock singers. Meanwhile Mick Jagger is an underground leader and John Lennon is the United States Secretary of State.
- In the short story "Ike at the Mike" by Howard Waldrop, jazz clarinetist Dwight D. Eisenhower performs at the White House for President Joseph P. Kennedy Jr. (described as the first two-term president since Huey Long), and remembers the ineffectual presidency of Al Smith; in the audience, Senator Presley considers his own presidential ambitions.
- In the Elseworlds comic book Elseworld's Finest: Supergirl & Batgirl by Tom Simmons, Matt Haley and Barbara Kesel, Elvis Presley is the incumbent president in 1998.
- In the novel Patton's Spaceship (part of the Timeline Wars series by John Barnes), there is a passage where the protagonist explains to travelers from a faraway alternative history timeline: "I am from one of the timelines where Elvis Presley never went into politics" – clearly implying that there were timelines where he did and in which it made a lot of difference.

== Q ==
=== Dan Quayle ===
- In Knight Rider 2000, Dan Quayle is president in 2000.
- Quayle was portrayed as having become president in an October 1988 Saturday Night Live sketch "Dan Quayle: President".

== R ==
=== Ayn Rand ===
- In the alternate history novel The Probability Broach as part of the North American Confederacy Series by L. Neil Smith in which the United States became a libertarian state in 1794 after a successful Whiskey Rebellion and George Washington being overthrown and executed by firing squad for treason, Ayn Rand served as the 22nd president of the North American Confederacy from 1952 to 1960. After Harriet Beecher Stowe and Rose Wilder Lane, she was the third woman to hold the office of the presidency. During her presidency, Ayn Rand becomes the first president to travel to the Moon.

=== Nancy Reagan ===
- Nancy Reagan was President of the United States in 1986 in one of alternate realities depicted in The Coming of the Quantum Cats by Frederik Pohl. She was considered a strong and assertive president, who successfully guided her version of the US through the major crisis of an invasion from a different reality. Her husband Ronald, known as the First Gentleman, was mostly disregarded. In this reality, John F. Kennedy was a Senator from Massachusetts who was married to a woman named Marilyn.

=== Ronald Reagan ===
- In the alternate history novel Warlord of the Air by Michael Moorcock which depicts a world in which World War I never took place, Ronald Reagan was a jingoistic Boy Scout troop leader in California in 1973. The novel was published in 1971, during his second term as Governor of California.
- In a parallel universe designated Earth-81426 featured in the comic book What If? Volume 1 No. 26 (April 1981), Ronald Reagan ran against the incumbent Democratic president, Jimmy Carter, and the New Populist Party candidate Captain America in 1980. While he stated that Captain America was one of the United States' greatest heroes, Reagan questioned whether the American people should elect a man whose face they had never seen. Captain America eventually won the election and revealed that Steven Rogers was his secret identity after being inaugurated as the 40th president on January 20, 1981.
- In one of the alternate realities depicted in The Coming of the Quantum Cats by Frederik Pohl in which the United States' political spectrum had shifted far to the right and the country had eventually become a police state, Ronald Reagan was a prominent left-wing activist who was regarded as a threat to national security by the US government in 1986. He was married to Jane Wyman and had previously been a moderately famous actor.
- In another of the alternate realities depicted in The Coming of the Quantum Cats by Frederik Pohl, Ronald Reagan was the mostly disregarded First Gentleman of the United States whereas his wife Nancy Reagan was the president.
- In a parallel universe designated Earth-267 featured in the comic book The Avengers No. 267 (May 1986), Ronald Reagan was president in 1986. In that year, he presided over a ceremony welcoming two new members, Storm and Colossus, to the Avengers in the Avengers Mansion in Manhattan, New York City. He and everyone else in attendance at the ceremony was killed by a bomb planted by Kang the Conqueror.
- In one of the timelines featured in the novel Replay by Ken Grimwood, Ronald Reagan defeated the incumbent president, Gerald Ford, in the Republican Party's presidential primaries in 1976 and went on to defeat Jimmy Carter in that year's election, taking office as the 39th president on January 20, 1977. In November 1979, President Reagan sent troops to Iran in response to 65 American citizens being taken hostage after a group of Iranian students who supported the Iranian Revolution took over the US Embassy in Tehran. Within less than a month, at least 132 Iranian revolutionaries had been killed while US casualties stood at 17 dead and 26 wounded. A group calling themselves the November Squad launched a terrorist attack on Madison Square Garden in New York City. The death toll was estimated to be 682. The November Squad threatened to conduct further attacks on American soil until all US forces were withdrawn from the Middle East. Reagan ordered further air strikes against rebel bases in the mountains east of Tabriz, where the Ayatollah Ruhollah Khomeini was believed to be hiding. Andrei Gromyko, the Soviet Minister of Foreign Affairs, expressed his nation's "sympathy with the freedom fighters of the Islamic Jihad."
- In the alternate history Dark Future novel series by Kim Newman, Ronald Reagan never entered politics and was best known for playing Maxwell Smart in Get Smart.
- In the short story "Dispatches From the Revolution" by Pat Cadigan contained in the anthology Alternate Presidents edited by Mike Resnick, Lyndon B. Johnson persevered and decided to run for a second full term in 1968. This caused widespread protests in the United States, eventually leading to a bomb being planted at the Democratic National Convention in Chicago, Illinois in August 1968. The explosion killed Johnson, Vice President Hubert Humphrey, Senator George McGovern of South Dakota and Senator Eugene McCarthy of Minnesota. While the official history stated that Senator Robert F. Kennedy of New York was likewise killed in the explosion, he was actually killed by a Chicago policeman. The chaos at the Convention led to a revolution. Ronald Reagan was elected president in 1968 and turned the US into an autocratic state. He used nuclear weapons to end the Vietnam War, leading to the vast majority of the Vietnamese people being wiped out.
- In the short story "Huddled Masses" by Lawrence Person, also contained in the anthology Alternate Presidents edited by Mike Resnick, Ronald Reagan lost the 1984 election to Walter Mondale, who became the 41st president. As a result, the Sandinista National Liberation Front movement expanded, causing a civil war in Mexico. This was followed by an invasion from the United States and a massive influx of Latin American refugees into the American Southwest.
- In the short story "A Dream Can Make a Difference" by Beth Meacham contained in the anthology By Any Other Fame, Ronald Reagan, the incumbent Governor of California, was defeated in his bid for re-election in 1970 to his Democratic opponent and fellow former Hollywood star Marilyn Monroe, who survived her drug overdose on August 5, 1962 and subsequently decided to enter politics. She later became the first female president in 1980 with the former Governor of Georgia, Jimmy Carter, as her vice president. After only 69 days in office, President Monroe was assassinated in Washington, D.C. on March 30, 1981 by John Hinckley Jr. Carter succeeded her as president.
- A deleted scene from the pilot episode of Sliders featured a reference to Ronald Reagan. In the first parallel universe seen on the series, Reagan had never been elected president and was serving as the Mayor of San Francisco in 1994. He vowed to bring law and order back to the streets of the city and, to that end, allowed private citizens to own handguns. This was regarded as a radical and ill-advised step, indicating that the Second Amendment to the United States Constitution which protects the right to keep and bear arms had never been passed in this universe. This version of Reagan likewise had an acting career before entering politics, though he left acting considerably later than his counterpart on Earth Prime. His best known acting role was as the first Howard "Mr. C" Cunningham in the hugely popular sitcom Happy Days during the 1970s. After he left the series, he was replaced in the role by Tom Bosley. However, Reagan was widely considered to be the definitive "Mr. C".
- In a parallel universe featured in the Sliders Season Two episode "Greatfellas" in which Prohibition was never repealed, Ronald Reagan served as president during the 1980s, though it is not made clear if he served two terms as he did in real life. At some point during his presidency, Reagan removed much of the power from the federal government in an attempt to return autonomy to the states. This attempt failed as the Mafia, which had grown rich on selling alcohol illicitly to the American public since 1920, vested said autonomy in their own organisation. Consequently, the US was severely weakened. In 1996, the Greenfields and the DeBellos, the two crime families which controlled California and Nevada respectively, attempted to merge their families in a play for missile command of the nuclear arsenal west of the Rocky Mountains. Their plan was for those two states as well as Oregon and Washington to secede from the Union. With the help of Rembrandt Brown, the Deputy Director of the FBI, and his task force, the Incorruptibles, the merger was stopped. District Attorney (and gubernatorial candidate) Joe Biacchi was subsequently revealed to be one of the families' co-conspirators. Reagan was running against Biacchi for the position of Governor of California and won the election in a landslide. This version of Reagan did not suffer from Alzheimer's disease and governed the state until his death in 1998.
- In the short story "Mahogany Dreams" by Lyn Nichols contained in the anthology Alternate Tyrants edited by Mike Resnick, Ronald Reagan defeated the Democratic incumbent Jimmy Carter in the 1980 election in a landslide, as he did in real life. After only 69 days in office, Reagan was assassinated in Washington, D.C. on March 30, 1981 by John Hinckley Jr. as the culmination of an effort to impress Jodie Foster. After William Henry Harrison, who died on his 32nd day in office on April 4, 1841, he was the second shortest-serving president in US history. He was succeeded by his vice president, George H. W. Bush, who became the 41st president. However, Alexander Haig, the Secretary of State, was determined to preserve the presidency from continued denigration and plotted to remove his rivals and place himself in the Oval Office, including Bush.
- In the alternate history novel American Empire: The Victorious Opposition as part of the Southern Victory Series by Harry Turtledove, Ronald "Dutch" Reagan was a radio broadcaster in Des Moines, Iowa during the 1930s. He broadcast football games and had a tremendous talent for capturing and holding audiences' attention by making every play sound exciting.
- In the alternate history novel Russian Amerika by Stoney Compton, Ronald Reagan was the president of the Republic of California in 1987. However, this is a possible incongruity, as he was born in Tampico, Illinois, which it and most of the state of Illinois remains part of the United States.
- In the alternate history novel The Man with the Iron Heart by Harry Turtledove, Ronald Reagan was a moderately famous film star during the 1940s. Diana McGraw, the founder of the Mothers Against the Madness in Germany, met Reagan as well as several other actors at Gilmore Field while on an anti-occupation political four of Los Angeles in 1947. Reagan gave a blistering three-minute speech attacking President Harry S. Truman and the failure of his government to locate Reinhard Heydrich and defeat the German Freedom Front.
- In the alternate history novel 11/22/63 by Stephen King, Ronald Reagan defeated the incumbent President Hubert Humphrey in the 1976 election.
- In the alternate history novel Surrounded by Enemies: What if Kennedy Survived Dallas? by Bryce Zabel, Ronald Reagan defeated his Democratic opponent Jerry Brown, his successor as Governor of California, in 1976 and became the 38th president. His predecessor was Richard Nixon.
- In the alternate history novel Hammer of Angels by G.T. Almasi, Ronald Reagan was elected in 1976 and lost his 1980 reelection campaign.
- In Frank Miller's 1986 comic The Dark Knight Returns and its two-part film adaptation, taking place on Earth-31 (within the DC Universe) in an alternate 1986, Ronald Reagan is not only the president but also knows Superman's secret identity as Clark Kent. He instructs Superman to take down Batman after his vigilante actions cause the government some concerns.
- In the 2004 mockumentary film CSA: The Confederate States of America, Ronald Reagan served as President of the Confederacy sometime during the 1980s (probably 1982 to 1988). At one point in the film, a newspaper called CSA Today (a parody of USA Today) shows a picture of Reagan nominating John Ambrose Fauntroy V (a Confederate political dynast) as the CS Secretary of Commerce, and a blurb quoting a Canadian prime minister saying "Mr. Reagan, tear down this wall!" (referring to the 'Cotton Curtain' erected along the Confederate-Canadian border).
- In the second season of the television series For All Mankind, set in an alternate timeline where Alexi Leonov being the first man on the Moon leads to an accelerated space race, Ronald Reagan was elected as the 39th President in 1976, defeating incumbent Democrat Ted Kennedy, albeit after Ohio's electoral votes were contested in the Supreme Court. Subsequently being re-elected in 1980, Reagan presides over increased tension between the United States and the Soviet Union over space superiority, culminating in an armed US-Soviet standoff at the Jamestown moon base. After witnessing the handshake between Danielle Poole and Stephan Alexseev during the Apollo-Soyuz mission, Reagan seeks a peaceful resolution to tensions with Soviet Premier Yuri Andropov, culminating in a lunar peace treaty dividing the Moon into US and Soviet spheres of influence. Reagan was succeeded by Gary Hart in 1985.
- In the alternate history novella anthology Then Everything Changed by Jeff Greenfield, Gerald Ford wins the 1976 election after clarifying his statement that "There is no Soviet domination of Eastern Europe and there never will be under a Ford administration" during the second presidential debate, albeit winning a narrow electoral vote majority and losing the popular vote to Jimmy Carter. In 1980, Ronald Reagan secures the Republican nomination relatively unchallenged. To present himself as the change candidate following twelve years of Republican administrations, Reagan nominates Sandra Day O'Connor as his running mate. He is ultimately defeated by the Democratic candidate Gary Hart, owing to public backlash against economic recession after twelve years of Republican administrations, the campaign management of John Sears, Reagan's poor performance in the only presidential debate and an ad produced by the Hart campaign highlighting inconsistencies in his positions.
- In If Kennedy Lived by Jeff Greenfield, John F. Kennedy survives an assassination attempt in Dallas on November 22, 1963 as the installation of a plexiglass bubbletop on the Ford Lincoln sufficiently warned the Secret Service of the first shot fired by Lee Harvey Oswald. Kennedy went on to win re-election in 1964 albeit with Stuart Symington as his running mate following Lyndon B. Johnson's resignation. Due to Kennedy's withdrawal from Vietnam, fulfilment of the Civil Rights Act and stewardship of a strong economy, the 1968 election comes to be dominated by social issues, principally crime and hippie counterculture. Ronald Reagan secures the 1968 Republican presidential nomination over Richard Nixon on the third ballot at the Republican National Convention, nominating as his running mate Gerald Ford, who had previously served as Barry Goldwater's running mate in 1964. With the Reagan-Ford ticket running against Democratic nominee Hubert Humphrey and his running mate Albert Gore, Alabama Governor George Wallace decided against running as a third-party presidential candidate owing to his agreement with Reagan's policies and positions. With commentators saying that the election would be close, the events of the novel ends two days before Election Day (with the result of the election left unknown).

=== Robert Redford ===
- At the end of the comic Watchmen by Alan Moore, Robert Redford is rumored to be considering running against the Republican incumbent Richard Nixon, who will be seeking a fifth term, in the 1988 election. The 2019 TV series follow-up confirms he was indeed elected (albeit, in 1992) and remains the current President due to repeal of the Twenty-second Amendment during Richard Nixon's presidency. His administration saw the elimination of fossil fuels and the establishment of reparations in the form of tax-exempt status for the direct descendants of racial injustice. Henry Louis Gates Jr. served as his Secretary of the Treasury, and John Grisham was a Supreme Court Justice.

=== Thomas Brackett Reed ===
- In the alternate novel The Great War: American Front as part of the Southern Victory Series by Harry Turtledove, it was mentioned that Thomas Brackett Reed was elected president as a Democrat during the late 19th century. The timeframe of his term(s) is never disclosed. However, evidence in the book supports that Reed served from 1897 to 1902, which would make one of the four presidents in the timeline to die in office. The first and second presidents to die in office were William Henry Harrison and Zachary Taylor (who both died the same way they did in real life) and Al Smith was killed during a Confederate bombing raid on Philadelphia in 1942. He was lionized as a hero of the Remembrance culture that controlled the country in the period between the Second Mexican War (1881–1882) and the Great War (1914–1917). President Reed pledged to support Haiti's continued independence, refusing to allow the Confederate States of America to invade the island by entering into a treaty to protect Haiti from any Confederate attack. In the 20th century, Reed's profile appeared on the United States half dollar coin.

=== Keanu Reeves ===
- Keanu Reeves is mentioned as president in the Only Fools and Horses episode Heroes and Villains, although it turns out only to be a part of Rodney Trotter's nightmare.

=== Condoleezza Rice ===
- In the parallel universe featured in the 2006 BBC Four adaptation of the short story Random Quest by John Wyndham, Condoleezza Rice was the President in 2006. At the time, the United States and Japan are on the verge of war due to Japan's threatening behavior towards Indonesia and the Philippines over the course of the previous year. The South East Asian Crisis began when Japan discovered large oil deposits in the South Pacific in 2005. In this universe, the Soviet Union never pursued the policies of glasnost and perestroika and, as such, the Cold War intensified and the superpowers' influence on the world stage dwindled. The power vacuum was filled by the People's Republic of China, which was the most powerful country in the world by the mid-2000s. NASA and the China National Space Administration engaged in joint missions. One of these is the Juno mission, which involved the launch of an unmanned Jupiter polar explorer from Cape Canaveral in 2005. It took 15 months to reach Jupiter.

=== Nelson Rockefeller ===
- In a parallel universe, designated Earth-712 featured in the comic book The Avengers No. 147 (May 1976), Nelson Rockefeller was president in 1976. His immediate predecessor was Hubert Humphrey. In this universe, Richard Nixon never had a political career.
- Nelson Rockefeller is mentioned as the sitting president's immediate predecessor in Michael P. Kube-McDowell's novel Alternities. He is described as having had a difficult term in office.

=== Eleanor Roosevelt ===
- In the alternate history comic DC Comics Bombshells Annual 1, Amanda Waller mentions that Eleanor Roosevelt is president, but has the polio her husband had in the real world.

=== Franklin D. Roosevelt ===
- In H. G. Wells' The Shape of Things to Come (published 1934), Franklin Roosevelt was elected in 1932, valiantly but hopelessly tried to end the Great Depression. Roosevelt's New Deal proved a total failure and the country's depression steadily increased. In foreign policy, Roosevelt granted independence to the Philippines, accompanied by guarantees against aggression by other countries. This led the US to a short and inconclusive naval war with Japan; the United States Navy broke through a Japanese blockade and got to Manila. Later on, both the US and Japan broke off fighting due to their increasing economic disintegration, no longer able to wage external war and hardly able to keep control over their own national territories. Roosevelt, in charge of a country disintegrating into chaos, was in no condition to involve the US in the European War between Germany and Poland which broke in January 1940. He was the last US president to hold any real power over the entire territory between the Atlantic and the Pacific, with later presidents having real authority only in the environs of Washington, D.C.
- In The Man in the High Castle, by Philip K. Dick, Franklin Roosevelt was elected in 1932 but, before he could take office, he was assassinated by Giuseppe Zangara on February 15, 1933. Consequently, the vice president-elect, John Nance Garner, took office as the 32nd president on March 4, 1933. President Garner was re-elected in 1936, but failed to combat the Great Depression and the US remained strongly isolationist. He was succeeded in by John W. Bricker as the 33rd president in the 1940 election, a Republican who also failed to confront the economic and foreign policy issues. As a result of their combined presidencies, the Axis powers won World War II and proceeded to invade and conquer the United States in 1948. In the alternate history novel-within-a-novel The Grasshopper Lies Heavy by Hawthorne Abendsen, Roosevelt was not assassinated and went on to serve two terms. When he declined to run for a third term in 1940, his fellow Democrat Rexford Tugwell was elected as the 33rd president.
- In The Trinity Paradox by Kevin J. Anderson and Doug Beason, the well-intentioned interference of a time traveller caused the boosting of Nazi Germany's nuclear program, and New York City was devastated in June 1944 by a radioactive dust missile fired from a German U-boat—with the result that voters lost confidence in Franklin Roosevelt, who lost the 1944 election to Thomas E. Dewey. In his term, President Dewey instituted the policy of regularly using nuclear arms in whatever war the US was involved in, first against Germany and later against the Soviet Union and North Korea.
- In Robert Heinlein's "For Us, The Living: A Comedy of Customs" — written in the direct aftermath of the Democrats' heavy losses in the 1938 mid-term elections—by 1938–39 Franklin Roosevelt's New Deal is hopelessly derailed, with his own party failing to defend the president's economic policies against the constant attacks by his opponents. By the 1940 election Roosevelt proves unelectable, and his downfall drags the Democratic Party to ruin; Roosevelt is then killed in an accident in 1944. In politics, there is a sharp drift to the Right, culminating in an extreme-right dictatorship in the late 1940s – which, however, proves short-lived and after which the pendulum would swings sharply to the Left again, with Fiorello H. La Guardia—at the time of writing a reformer Mayor of New York City and outspoken supporter of Roosevelt, despite being nominally a Republican—picking up FDR's torch. Several decades later, a John Delano Roosevelt is mentioned among the six highly regarded reformers who revise the US Constitution and institute a new Libertarian regime.
- In the short story "A Fireside Chat" by Jack Nimersheim contained in the anthology Alternate Presidents edited by Mike Resnick, Franklin Roosevelt was elected as vice president on a ticket with James M. Cox in 1920 after his Republican opponent Warren G. Harding died of a stroke. Five weeks after the election, however, President-elect Cox was assassinated by an anti-League of Nations activist, meaning that Roosevelt took office as the 29th president on March 4, 1921. At only 38 years old, he was the youngest man to ever serve as president. Shortly after the Nazi Party rose to power as a result of the Burgerbrau Putsch in 1922, Roosevelt and the Chancellor of Germany, Adolf Hitler, established an alliance in order to maintain the balance of power.
- In the short story "Truth, Justice, and the American Way" by Lawrence Watt-Evans, also contained in Alternate Presidents edited by Mike Resnick, Franklin Roosevelt lost the 1932 election to the Republican incumbent Herbert Hoover as a result of Al Smith, the Democratic nominee in 1928, running as a third party candidate and splitting the Democratic Party votes. He ran again in 1936 and 1940, losing both times to Henry L. Stimson. Consequently, the Munich Agreement prevented World War II. In 1948, Adolf Hitler was overthrown and killed by a cabal of generals and Hermann Göring succeeded him as the second Führer, continuing to serve in that position until at least 1953. Due to the survival of Nazi Germany, totalitarianism and antisemitism grew stronger across the world well into the 1950s.
- In the short story "Kingfish" by Barry N. Malzberg, another story contained in Mike Resnick's edited anthology Alternate Presidents, Franklin Roosevelt was defeated in 1936 by his fellow Democrat, Senator Huey Long of Louisiana, who ran as an independent with Roosevelt's vice president, John Nance Garner, as his running mate. In 1938, President Long invited Adolf Hitler to visit Washington, D.C. and allowed for him to be assassinated via a bomb, triggering war with Nazi Germany.
- In "No Other Choice" by Barbara Delaplace, also contained in the anthology Alternate Presidents edited by Mike Resnick, an ill Franklin Roosevelt loses the 1944 election to the Governor of New York, Thomas E. Dewey, who became the 33rd president. In 1945, President Dewey eventually decided to drop the atomic bomb on Tokyo rather than Hiroshima, leading to the deaths of eight million Japanese civilians.
- In the Worldwar series by Harry Turtledove, Franklin Roosevelt led the United States into World War II, declaring war on the Empire of Japan and Nazi Germany, following the Japanese attack on Pearl Harbor on December 7, 1941. However, the war was disrupted by the invasion of Earth by the Race on June 5, 1942. Roosevelt escaped the destruction of Washington, D.C. by one of the Race's atomic bombs and provided his country with strong and inspiring leadership as it desperately battled the Race. While his location was kept secret, he was able to broadcast speeches via radio and film. He was also able to visit the crucial explosive-metal bomb project located in Denver, Colorado, where he discussed fighting the Race with General Leslie Groves at length. However, the grueling conditions which he endured while the United States fought off the invading Race and the stress of leading his country at such a desperate time took a great toll on his health and he died in 1944. As Vice President Henry A. Wallace had been killed when the Race destroyed Seattle, Washington earlier that year, Roosevelt was succeeded as the 33rd president by Cordell Hull, the Secretary of State.
- In the Elseworlds one-shot comic book Superman: War of the Worlds, Franklin Roosevelt was killed in the Martian invasion of 1938. He was succeeded as the 33rd president by John Nance Garner, who had been his vice president. Garner's own vice president was Lex Luthor.
- In Fredric Brown's What Mad Universe?, Franklin Roosevelt—like everybody else in the world—was faced with the most crucial crisis in human history—a total Space War against the monstrous, insectoid Arcturians (usually nicknamed "Arcs") with whom no negotiation or compromise was possible and whose manifest aim was to completely exterminate every last human being. The crisis broke out in the very beginning of Roosevelt's first term, and the acute danger was brought home to Americans when in June 1933 Chicago was totally destroyed in an Arcturian raid, with the loss of five million lives. As Roosevelt made clear to the American public, there was no question that the US, like all other countries, had to give up some of its sovereignty to the World War Council and give generously to the Common War Effort of Humanity—especially to maintain the Space Navy commanded by the Space Hero Dopelle, which was all that stood between Humanity and total extinction. The destruction of Rome in the same year propelled Italian Americans and Catholics in general to be especially vehement in calling for "Bloody Revenge on The Arcs!", and both were prominently represented among recruits crowding the Space Navy recruitment centers. The US kept considerable autonomy in its internal affairs, with the Constitution, Presidency and Congress intact (more or less). The US did agree to let the WBI (World Bureau of Investigation) have jurisdiction in its territory, including the right to arrest American citizens—needed in order to maintain global security against the common dire threat. And a relaxation of Constitutional guarantees was inevitable due to the Arcturians' ability to take over the body of a human being and infiltrate such spies into the human population. Bitter experience had shown that due to the Arcturians' mental and physical powers, it was difficult to capture such spies and if captured they could easily escape—and that a single loose Arcturian spy might well cause the loss of millions of human lives. Therefore, Roosevelt obtained the authorization for law enforcement agents—and even for private citizens—to shoot to kill at any suspected Arcturian spy. The loss of hundreds of innocent lives, every time a spy scare broke out, was considered a regrettable lesser evil. Another unpalatable but necessary war measure which Roosevelt implemented was the imposition of "Mistout", a completely impenetrable artificial darkness spread overnight all throughout the main cities—since ordinary blackout was not enough to hide them from raiding Arcturian ships. The Mistout did prevent other cities from sharing the fate of Chicago and Rome, but at the price of making it impossible to police city streets at night; the totally dark night streets became the haunt of murderous criminal gangs, forcing law abiding citizens to barricade themselves at home until first light and putting a complete end to any kind of night life. As the President patiently explained, all that was a necessary sacrifice, vitally needed in order to survive and eventually win the war. Finally, there was the major worldwide economic crisis precipitated when the Arcturians flooded Earth with enormous quantities of perfectly forged money, causing a galloping inflation. It was solved by creating a new kind of paper notes which the Arcturians were unable to duplicate. All the world currencies were replaced by the Credit—with each country backing its own currency but all of them being in Credits and all kept at par and globally interchangeable. Fred M. Vinson, placed by Roosevelt in charge of the transition from Dollars and Cents to Credits, did it smoothly and effectively. Altogether, Franklin Roosevelt was a highly successful war leader, inspiring confidence and getting Americans used to the hitherto unimaginable situation of being totally involved in a war of survival against murderous extraterrestrials. Roosevelt did not live to see the end of the Arcturian War, which at the time of his death entered a long tense stalemate which would only be broken in 1954.
- In the 2003 alternate history short story "Joe Steele" by Harry Turtledove, Franklin Roosevelt, the Governor of New York, was one of the two front runners for the Democratic presidential candidate in 1932. The other was Congressman Joe Steele of California. After two days of voting at the Democratic National Convention in Chicago, neither candidate had the necessary two-thirds majority to secure the nomination. Steele arranged for the Governor's Mansion in Albany, New York to be set on fire. Governor Roosevelt was killed in the blaze. Nothing tied the fire to Steele, who secured his party's nomination. Steele defeated the extremely unpopular Republican incumbent Herbert Hoover with John Nance Garner as his running mate. He was inaugurated as the 32nd president on March 4, 1933, and went on to create a brutal dictatorship in the United States. He was elected to an unprecedented six terms from 1932 to 1952 before dying in office on March 5, 1953. The 84-year-old Garner briefly succeeded him as the 34th president but was soon overthrown and executed at the order of J. Edgar Hoover, whose reign proved to be even more tyrannical than Steele's.
- In the 2015 alternate history novel Joe Steele, also by Turtledove and an expansion to the 2003 short story, New York Governor Franklin D. Roosevelt and California Congressman Joe Steele became the front runners for the party's presidential nomination. Roosevelt pledged his New Deal plan. Steele touted his Four Year Plan, which included collectivizing farms, updating the country's power grid, and nationalizing the banks. Steele secretly attended the convention in Chicago, a fact known only to his close advisers: Vince Scriabin, Lazar Kagan, and Stas Mikoian. AP reporter Charlie Sullivan also knew after running into Steele and Scriabin in a hotel elevator. As Sullivan backed Steele over Roosevelt, he kept his peace. Conversely, Roosevelt remained in Albany, New York as was the custom. After the first day of balloting, Roosevelt held a press conference in Albany, during which he extolled the virtues of his proposed New Deal. He also implied Steele's Four Year Plan was proof of Steele's authoritarian tendencies, and that as the child of Russian immigrants, Steele didn't truly understand how America worked. Meanwhile, in Chicago, after two days of votes, although Roosevelt had a slight lead, neither candidate had the needed two-thirds majority. Realizing he might lose after another day of voting, Steele directed Scriabin to have Roosevelt burned alive at Executive Mansion in Albany. As Roosevelt's legs were rendered useless by polio, he was unable to escape the building in time and was killed. Roosevelt's wife, Eleanor and several members of the mansion's staff are also killed in the fire. With his primary opponent gone, Steele became the party's presidential nominee, choose John Nance Garner as his running mate, and won the election against Herbert Hoover later in November. The Roosevelt's would be buried in Hyde Park.
- In the alternate history short story "News from the Front" by Harry Turtledove, Franklin Roosevelt faced harsh criticism from and strict scrutiny by the American press following the United States' entry into World War II on December 11, 1941. The press attacked the Roosevelt administration for not being prepared for the attack on Pearl Harbor on December 7, 1941, as well as bringing on the attack by ignorantly imposing an oil embargo on the Empire of Japan. As the war progressed, the press began to constantly second-guess the Roosevelt administration and to ponder the value of the war. Furthermore, the press revealed important American military secrets, questioning the morality of spying on the Axis powers, decrying the poor state of American technology and giving away planned attacks days before there were to take place, leading to their failures. More importantly, the Battle of Midway (June 4–7, 1942) proved to be a complete disaster. During the first half of 1942, protests against the war began to appear throughout the country and a group of celebrities took it upon themselves to sale to Japan and Nazi Germany to offer peace. The British Prime Minister Winston Churchill faced similar problems in his own country. Matters came to a head when Vice President Henry A. Wallace broke with the administration and publicly attacked Roosevelt's honesty and competence. Calls for impeachment grew louder throughout the United States and, finally, Congress began the impeachment process in June 1942. Although the story ends while Roosevelt is still president, it is heavily implied that he will be impeached and removed from office and that Wallace will succeed him as the 33rd president.
- In the Days of Infamy alternate history series by Harry Turtledove, Franklin Roosevelt received a declaration of war against the Empire of Japan after Japanese forces attacked and conquered the territory of Hawaii from December 1941 to February 1942. Roosevelt also received such a declaration against Nazi Germany. Although Roosevelt saw Germany as a greater threat, Japan was the more immediate one and so he was forced to abandon his "Germany first" policy, instead directing the military to retake Hawaii. The Japanese occupation of Hawaii was harsh particularly for American prisoners of war who were imprisoned in camps, where they were worked to death. The citizenry was subject to the whims of the occupiers. Curfews were imposed, rationing was at a bare minimum, and civilians and POWs alike were expected to bow to Japanese soldiers as they passed on the street. The Japanese created a puppet government, ruling through a member of the Hawaiian Royal Family installed as King in the 'Iolani Palace. The United States eventually retook Hawaii in 1943. Consequently, Roosevelt was widely expected to win a fourth term in 1944 in spite of his declining health.
- In the alternative timeline featured in the Star Trek: The Original Series novel Provence of Shadows by David R. George III, a sequel to the television episode "The City on the Edge of Forever", in which the 23rd century Starfleet officer Dr. Leonard McCoy saved the social worker Edith Keeler from being killed in a traffic accident in 1930, Keeler went on to found the American Pacifist Movement, a large and influential peace organisation. On February 23, 1936, Franklin Roosevelt met with Keeler during a visit to New York City, where they discussed both the social issues of the day, as well as importance of maintaining the United States' neutrality toward the military conflicts then spreading through Europe. The growth of Keeler's organization in the following years managed to influence Roosevelt's foreign and military policies, forcing him to assume a less aggressive stance against the Axis powers in the early years of World War II. Because of these changes, the Empire of Japan did not attack Pearl Harbor on December 7, 1941 as in the original timeline, and the United States' entry into the war was delayed by several years. On December 29, 1941, Roosevelt paid an official visit to Atlanta, Georgia. In response, the Republican Governor of Georgia invited the American Pacifist Movement to hold a rally at the state capitol on the same day. Roosevelt was eventually succeeded by Harry S. Truman, presumably under the circumstances as in reality. By 1944, the United Kingdom had been invaded and conquered by Nazi Germany whereas Australia and New Zealand were conquered by Japan. The Axis powers subsequently attacked the Territory of Hawaii and other territories in the Pacific, finally drawing the United States into the war. The war continued until well into the 1950s. The Nazis dropped an atomic bomb in Atlanta in 1954. As Spock told Captain James T. Kirk in "The City on the Edge of Forever", Nazi Germany would eventually defeat the United States, securing the Axis' ultimate victory in the war. Consequently, the United Federation of Planets was never founded, as it had been in 2161 of the original timeline. Against this background unfolds the story of Dr. Leonard McCoy: resigned to being abandoned by his crewmates from the USS Enterprise, McCoy had planned to settle in his native Georgia in 1932—but was accosted by two other vagabonds on the train and found himself in Hayden, South Carolina. After performing an emergency tracheotomy later that year, he revealed himself to be a physician and was offered a partnership in the practice of Dr. William Lyles. He became Hayden's sole physician following Lyle's death in 1934. In the war of the 1950s, a Nazi fighter plane was shot down over Hayden and crashed on the edge of town—whereupon McCoy was stabbed and killed by the pilot, to whom he had been attempting to render medical aid.
- In the alternate history novels Settling Accounts: Drive to the East, Settling Accounts: The Grapple and Settling Accounts: In at the Death, all part of the Southern Victory Series by Harry Turtledove, Franklin Roosevelt was a lifelong Socialist politician in spite of being a relative of the staunch Democratic president, Theodore Roosevelt. He lost the use of his legs when he contracted poliomyelitis in the 1920s. If not for this, some speculated, Roosevelt might have become president himself. Nonetheless, he served as Secretary of War from 1933 to 1937 and as Assistant Secretary of War from 1937 to 1945. He oversaw the project to build a superbomb as well as intelligence on other countries' own superbomb projects during the Second Great War (1941–1944). Roosevelt first rose to prominence, ironically, as Secretary of War in Democrat President Herbert Hoover's cabinet. His Socialist views on domestic policy were out of step with Hoover's laissez-faire approach to government. However, Roosevelt's views on foreign policy were perfectly aligned with the Democrats, particularly as it applied to the Confederate States of America. Upon the election of Socialist Al Smith as the 32nd President in 1936, Roosevelt was, to all appearances, demoted to Assistant Secretary of War. In fact, however, he willingly embraced relative obscurity as a kind of disguise, hiding from the Confederate States the importance of what he was engaged on. As Jake Featherston, the President of the Confederate States of America, began sabre-rattling and war seemed imminent, Roosevelt was given the responsibility of overseeing the United States superbomb project in Hanford, Washington. Roosevelt maintained that position throughout the Second Great War, even after Smith was killed and Charles W. La Follette succeeded him as president. Although the CS was the first country in North America to use a superbomb, detonating it on the outskirts of Philadelphia, Roosevelt's programme produced two such bombs for the US, accelerating the victory of the United States and the German Empire on July 14, 1944.
- In Harry Turtledove's The War That Came Early, President Franklin Roosevelt was faced in October 1938 with the outbreak of World War II, when the Munich Conference failed, Hitler invaded Czechoslovakia and Britain and France declared war on Germany. The United States remained neutral when but Roosevelt began to slowly guide the country towards re-armament. In October 1939, with Germany retreating on the Western Front and stalled out on the Eastern Front, Roosevelt proposed a general cease-fire, all boundaries be returned to the status quo ante bellum, but Hitler rebuffed Roosevelt's suggestion. While the U.S. remained neutral, Roosevelt, viewing the war in Europe at least as one against liberty on the part of the Germans, sent arms to Britain and France, including a fleet of obsolete destroyers. He also offered to mediate an end to the war between the Soviet Union and Japan, but while the USSR readily accepted the offer, Japan did not, and the Japanese went on to conquer Vladivostok and eastern Siberia. In mid-1940, while Roosevelt began his campaign for an unprecedented third term, Britain and France reached a peace with Germany, and joined Germany in a war against the USSR. Disgusted, Roosevelt announced at a speech in Philadelphia in October 1940 that the U.S. would no longer ship arms to Britain and France, and would additionally stop shipping scrap metal and oil to Japan until Japan left China. Despite the break with the two-term tradition, Roosevelt was able to win the presidential election of 1940 handily, defeating Republican Wendell Willkie and isolationist candidate Alf Landon. While it appeared the United States had a brief reprieve from the war, on January 12, 1941, just over a week before Roosevelt was inaugurated for a third time, Japanese forces attacked United States possessions, including the Philippines and Hawaii. The next day, Roosevelt asked for, and received, a declaration of war. On January 20, Roosevelt addressed the country immediately after his third swearing-in. He reminded the country of his pledge that no Americans would die in foreign wars, but that Japan had made that decision for the U.S. He also reminded the country that whoever won in Europe, liberty would be the loser. After that statement drew a cry of "No European war!", Roosevelt reiterated that there would be no American involvement in the war in Europe, but that the U.S. would achieve victory in the Far East and become strong enough to defeat any other enemy. The so-called big switch didn't last. In London the pro-German government of Horace Wilson was toppled by the British military in the spring of 1941, and the new government re-declared war on Germany immediately.] France followed suit at the end of the year, withdrawing its troops from the Soviet Union and relaunching its war against Germany. Roosevelt resumed sending them supplies, and for their part the French supplied the Spanish Republicans who started winning the ongoing Spanish Civil War in which the US was not directly involved. On some occasions German U-boats attacked American ships. Nevertheless, American public opinion and Congress would not accept direct involvement in the European War, feeling that the war against Japan was quite enough. On that front, things went badly for the U.S. throughout 1941 and into 1942. The Japanese Navy mauled the US fleet in the Philippines, an attack that also claimed the life of General Douglas MacArthur. The surviving ships were forced to flee and they headed south to Java, making Surabaya their port of operations. Ships from the US and the UK also gathered at the port, creating an allied fleet. By mid-February, the fleet was called into action when Japanese forces landed on eastern Borneo, in order to capture the military bases there. However, the subsequent Battle of the Java Sea was a terrific defeat for the over-confident and badly coordinated allies. Japan was able to consolidate its hold in Southeast Asia, and began to redouble it attacks on Hawaii. Determined to regain momentum, the U.S. launched the largest task force the world had ever seen against in an attempt to retake Wake Island. That subsequent battle proved an even greater disaster for the U.S. than Java Sea, with the US losing all of its aircraft carriers. Midway fell shortly after, leaving Hawaii as the USA's most forward defense post. Despite this series of set backs, the Democrats were able to hold a majority with some losses in the 1942 Congressional election. In the top secret realm of military affairs, Roosevelt met another setback when a project for a new and powerful bomb was declared a boondoggle and cancelled. As this remained a secret, Roosevelt avoided criticism from opponents. 1944 proved to be the turning point in the Pacific. While Japan began the year with free rein to bomb Hawaii with relative impunity throughout 1942 and into 1943, even using biological weapons, by early 1944, a dramatic raid on Midway succeeded in driving the Japanese out. Meanwhile, after months of tension Hitler decided to declare war on the United States when German U-boats attacked several American merchant ships in March, 1944. Now Roosevelt had the complete justification to enter the European war he sent US troops across the Atlantic, but when he barely began preparations several German military leaders—considering Hitler's act to be mad and suicidal—formed the Committee for the Salvation of the German Nation, with General Heinz Guderian as their leader, and assassinated Hitler in April. Guderian and the Committee triumphed in the subsequent civil war, and fighting ceased on all fronts in Europe, with no American troops having taken part. As the war in Europe ended before the U.S. could involve itself, Roosevelt remained an observer of the European peace process. He established an alliance with the Soviet Union to facilitate a quick end to the war with Japan. For his part, Joseph Stalin was eager to get American help in regaining Vladivostok and eastern Siberia, and possibly moving further into Japanese territory. Meanwhile, with the Spanish Civil War having ended with the total victory of the Republicans, left-wing American volunteers of the Abraham Lincoln Brigade who had been fighting in Spain since 1937 started coming home—though some remained in Spain, married Spanish wives and gained the citizenship of the grateful Spanish Republic. At Roosevelt's direction, the State Department took no position towards them, neither approving nor disapproving.
- In the alternate history novel Dominion by C. J. Sansom, World War II ended in June 1940 when the British government, under the leadership of the Prime Minister Lord Halifax, signed the Treaty of Berlin with Nazi Germany. Franklin Roosevelt was steadfast in his opposition to the Nazis and the Treaty, which resulted in him losing the 1940 election to his Republican opponent Robert A. Taft, who became the 33rd president. Taft pursued a policy of non-intervention, signing a peace treaty with the Empire of Japan in 1941. He was re-elected in 1944 and 1948 but was defeated by his Democratic opponent Adlai Stevenson in 1952. Shortly after his election in November 1952, The Times, which was owned by the pro-Nazi British Prime Minister Lord Beaverbrook, speculated that Stevenson would follow in Roosevelt's footsteps and pursue an interventionist foreign policy when it came to European affairs.
- In Franz Ferdinand Lives! A World Without World War I (2014) by Richard Ned Lebow in which neither World War I nor World War II took place, Franklin Roosevelt was elected in 1936 and served two unremarkable terms. He was succeeded by Thomas E. Dewey.
- Clash of Eagles by Leo Rutman, in December, 1941. Nazi Germany has vanquished the United Kingdom and launches a major invasion across the Atlantic. German forces under Erwin Rommel land in Quebec and sweep down Canada, New England, and the Ohio Valley to New York City and declared the eastern United States an occupied territory. The rest of the United States remains unoccupied but perilously exposed to further attacks. President Franklin Roosevelt and the government administration evacuate the endangered Washington, D.C. and flee westward to California. Eventually, he would be able to return victoriously after a courageous rebellion in New York has driven the Nazis out.
- In David Mason's The Shores of Tomorrow, the slave-holding South dominated a technologically backward US from its foundation until the 1940s, when a series of Northern rebellions broke out. Admiral Franklin Roosevelt, leading a Northern Rebel naval force, was killed in the Battle of Long Island Sound. His sacrifice was not in vain, eventually the Northern secessionists won and established three Free Republics.
- In another timeline featured in the same David Mason book, the United States in the early 20th century went through turbulent upheavals, civil strife and coups with various Presidents rapidly rising and soon being overthrown and executed. Franklin Roosevelt, nicknamed "The Quiet Dutchman", was a major power broker and kingmaker who made and broke Presidents and did not seek or need the formal title himself.
- In Len Deighton's novel SS-GB (and the TV miniseries based on it), Nazi Germany successfully invaded and occupied Britain in 1940–1941—harsh news for US President Franklin Roosevelt. Roosevelt allowed the exile Rear Admiral Connolly to create a British government-in-exile in Washington DC, after Winston Churchill was captured and executed by the Germans. However, Roosevelt dithered about granting Connolly's government full diplomatic recognition. There was a long judicial battle before Connolly's people were given possession of the British Embassy in Washington, with the Nazi-collaborating government in London employing some of the best lawyers in America—and Roosevelt retained the US Embassy in London, in charge of the Nazi-friendly Ambassador Joseph Kennedy. Later on, Roosevelt welcomed in Washington the exile teenage Queen Elizabeth II, who was crowned in New Zealand at the age of fifteen after her father, King George VI was killed when the British Underground tried to get him out of the Tower of London. Roosevelt also authorized the secret sending of American Marines to raid and destroy the British nuclear bomb research laboratory at Bringle Sands in Devon – both to keep it out of Nazi hands and to gain vital nuclear information for the Americans' own program. The British Underground, in contact with the Americans, hoped that eventually the US would go to war with Germany and Britain would be liberated. This seemed to be also Roosevelt's long-term intention, but in 1941 (when the story is set) this seemed quite far off. Though the Bringle Sands raid could be considered an act of war, the Nazis—involved in a complicated power struggle among themselves—chose to ignore it. At the end of the book Roosevelt was biding his time, preparing for a war with Tojo's Japan and in the meantime keeping a facade of cordial relations with Germany—Hermann Göring and Joseph Goebbels being on board the first non-stop Lufthansa flight from London to New York. Meanwhile, the Manhattan Project (possibly under a different code name in this history) is progressing.
- In Newt Gingrich and William Forstchen's book "1945", Adolf Hitler did not declare war on the United States after Pearl Harbor. As a result, President Franklin Roosevelt had no pretext to take the US into the European war—much as he would have liked to do it. In the following years, the US concentrated its full military potential on Japan alone, achieving a complete victory by conventional means. At the same time, Roosevelt downgraded the Manhattan Project and in 1945 the US was still far from possessing a nuclear bomb. Meanwhile, Nazi Germany decisively defeated the Soviet Union and forced Britain to sign a peace recognizing German domination of Europe. Having won the war against Japan in 1944, Roosevelt declined to run again, and surprisingly designated as his heir Andrew Harrison, the (fictional) Junior Senator from Nebraska (the book does not explain why Harrison was preferred over Harry Truman). It was Harrison who had to bear the dire results of the above developments – when Hitler launched a surprise invasion of Britain, sent commandos under Otto Skorzeny to destroy the nuclear facility at Oak Ridge, Tennessee and seemed ahead of the US in the race to gain a nuclear bomb.
- Given the high number of World War II-centered alternate history fiction, Franklin Roosevelt appears in many stories as president and his presidency is usually altered accordingly.

=== Theodore Roosevelt ===
- In And Having Writ... by Donald R. Bensen, Theodore Roosevelt was re-elected in 1912 and 1916, succeeding the 27th president, Thomas Edison, who served one term. As with Grover Cleveland, he was counted twice in the numbering of the presidents: as the 26th president from 1901 to 1909 and the 28th president from 1913 to 1921. In 1909, he helps the four aliens Raf, Ari, Valmis, and Dark to escape house arrest in New York, all four which were placed under house arrest under the orders of President Thomas Edison earlier that year. While attending the demonstration of an experimental Moon rocket in 1925, Roosevelt was killed when the device's engines exploded.
- In the alternate history short story "The Bull Moose at Bay" by Mike Resnick contained in his edited anthology Alternate Presidents, Theodore Roosevelt was the subject of an assassination attempt carried out by John Flammang Schrank in Milwaukee, Wisconsin on October 14, 1912, as he was in reality. Whereas he was shot in the chest on that occasion in real life, Schrank's bullet missed him in the story. Running as the Progressive Party candidate, Roosevelt went on to defeat both the extremely unpopular incumbent Republican president, William Howard Taft, and their Democratic opponent, Woodrow Wilson, in the 1912 election. He therefore became the 28th president, having previously served as the 26th president from 1901 to 1909. He entered office as the most popular president since Abraham Lincoln or perhaps even Thomas Jefferson. During his second presidency, Roosevelt was a strong supporter of civil rights and women's suffrage, arguing that he could not be the president of all the people when six out of ten adults in the United States could not vote either for him or his opponent as they saw fit. Shortly after the sinking of the passenger liner RMS Lusitania by the German U-boat U-20 on May 7, 1915, Roosevelt brought the United States into the Great War, resulting in the defeat of Germany by the US and its allies within less than a year. This made the United States a world power. In spite of this and the fact that the economy was experiencing a boom, Roosevelt was widely expected to lose the 1916 election to Wilson. At his 58th birthday party on October 27, 1916, Roosevelt attributed his consistently poor performance in the polls to the fact that his erstwhile colleagues in the Republican Party were bitter that he had run as a Progressive Party candidate in 1912 and defeated Taft. He claimed that the Republicans owned three-quarters of the newspapers in the United States whereas the Democrats owned the remaining quarter, meaning that the vast majority of the press coverage was hostile. He expressed regret that his vice president, Charles Evans Hughes, would be voted out of office along with him as he believed that Hughes would have otherwise been elected president in 1920 and would have done an excellent job.
- In the alternate history novel 1901 by Robert Conroy, President William McKinley died of a sudden heart attack in 1901 after being overwhelmed by the invasion of Long Island by Germany. Theodore Roosevelt succeeded him as the 26th president and went on to win the war against Germany that results in Kaiser Wilhelm II getting overthrown and replaced by his son Wilhelm III as a puppet ruler.
- In the short story "Ten Days That Shook the World" by Kim Newman and Eugene Byrne contained in the anthology Back in the USSA, Theodore Roosevelt was re-elected in 1912 as the Progressive Party candidate. He became the last democratically elected President of the United States. Before he could take office, he was assassinated in Chicago, Illinois, on December 19, 1912, by the sharpshooter and exhibition shooter Annie Oakley when personally attempting to break up a labor strike with the help of the Rough Riders at the Union Stockyards. Consequently, Vice President-elect Charles Foster Kane, an extremely wealthy newspaper mogul, was inaugurated as the 28th president on March 4, 1913. Although Kane was a Progressive, his vice president, William Jennings Bryan, was a Democrat whereas his Secretary of War, Warren G. Harding, was a Republican. During his presidency, Kane led the United States into greater levels of oppression, class division and bureaucratic incompetence and corruption. President Kane brought the United States into the Great War following the sinking of the passenger liner RMS Titanic on October 9, 1914, an extremely unpopular decision among the American public. Kane rigged the 1916 election, defeating the Democratic candidate Woodrow Wilson and the Republican candidate former president William Howard Taft as Roosevelt had done in 1912. By February 1917, Wilson had been assassinated and many believed that Kane's agents were responsible. Wilson came to be regarded as a martyr by those opposed to Kane's regime. Within months of his re-election, the United States had become politically and socially unstable with overwhelming civil unrest, stemming from the massive and seemingly pointless loss of American lives in the mud of the Western Front and the increasingly gap between the "robber barons" and the workers as well as the massive corruption and the resulting exploitation of ordinary people. The Socialist Party of America, led by Eugene V. Debs, gained considerable report among the disenfranchised populace and soon the unrest led to outright civil war. After the storming of the White House by the Socialist faction on July 4, 1917, Kane was shot and killed by Oakley, as Roosevelt had been four and a half years earlier. This resulted in the establishment of the United Socialist States of America (USSA) with Debs as its first president. Washington, D.C. was renamed "Debs, D.C." in his honor. After Debs' death in 1926, he was succeeded by Al Capone, who proceeded to turn the USSA into a brutal dictatorship, creating a cult of personality around himself and executing his rivals.
- In the Southern Victory alternate history series by Harry Turtledove, Theodore Roosevelt was the 28th president of the United States, serving from March 4, 1913, to March 4, 1921. He is best remembered as being the president during the Great War (1914–1917), and is one of the most highly esteemed presidents in US history. Not long after his 20th birthday in 1878, Roosevelt headed west, reinventing himself as a rancher in the Montana Territory. He was engaged to Alice Hathaway Lee at the time. In time, Roosevelt acquired a substantial ranch. When the Second Mexican War (1881–1882) began, Roosevelt attempted to join a volunteer regiment, only to learn the territory was not raising any. He raised a cavalry regiment of his own, Roosevelt's Unauthorized Regiment, which he equipped and fed his own expense until they were provisionally accepted into the US Regular Army as the First Montana Volunteer Cavalry. He patrolled the border with the Dominion of Canada until British General Charles George Gordon invaded Montana. Roosevelt took part in the Battle of the Teton River, which saw Gordon's defeat. He and Colonel George Armstrong Custer competed for coverage of their respective heroics in the newspapers, touching off a lifelong rivalry between the two. During the ceasefire, Roosevelt had a one-night stand with a widow near Fort Benton. Roosevelt was elected president in 1912, defeating the Socialist candidate Senator Eugene V. Debs. When Archduke Franz Ferdinand, the heir apparent to Austria-Hungary, was assassinated in Sarajevo on June 28, 1914, Roosevelt vowed to support his Central Powers allies, leading to a declaration of war against the Confederate States of America. During the war, Roosevelt made frequent visits to military positions. On the Roanoke Front, he once narrowly had his life saved by Chester Martin. He was re-elected by a huge margin in the wartime election of 1916, once again defeating Debs. Roosevelt led the United States to its first wartime victory since the First Mexican War (1846–1848) and altered the balance of power on the North American continent by expelling the British from Canada, creating the Republic of Quebec, and placing severe arms and economic restrictions on the Confederate States. After the war, labor unrest broke out across the country, and Roosevelt's Democratic Party was seen as a part of the problem rather than of the solution. In 1918, control of Congress passed to the Socialists for the first time. In 1920, Socialist candidate Upton Sinclair defeated Roosevelt's unprecedented bid for a third presidential term. Sinclair became the 29th president as well as the first member of his party to hold the office. Roosevelt quietly left the political stage while his successor rolled back many of his policies and pursued a wide variety of personal interests, including aviation and big game hunting. He died suddenly of a cerebral hemorrhage while golfing in 1924. Upon his request, he was buried in Arlington County, West Virginia, the former estate of Robert E. Lee. Arlington had been in Confederate territory until Roosevelt avenged the United States' defeat in the War of Secession (1861–1862), making the interment site a fitting one. Roosevelt is considered the greatest, most beloved, and most memorable president in US history. In the last category, he is approached by only George Washington, Thomas Jefferson and Abraham Lincoln. Of the four, he is the only one remembered in an entirely positive light as Washington and Jefferson were from Virginia and Lincoln lost the War of Succession. In the Confederacy, Roosevelt was remembered as a fearsome enemy, but the memory was wreathed in a healthy respect. Roosevelt's burial in Lee's onetime home offended many Confederates, especially in the Freedom Party. Confederate States President Jake Featherston frequently reflected on how "another Theodore Roosevelt" would make "a dangerous enemy," and was relieved that such presidents as Hosea Blackford, Herbert Hoover, Al Smith and Charles W. La Follette were considerably less formidable. In the 1930s, a film based on the exploits of Roosevelt's famous Unauthorized Regiment during the Second Mexican War was released to critical acclaim. Roosevelt was played by Marion Morrison. Despite being a staunch Democrat, he was a relative of the lifelong Socialist politician Franklin D. Roosevelt, who served as Secretary of War from 1933 to 1937 and Assistant Secretary of War from 1937 to 1945.
- In Mike Resnick's story Over there, Theodore Roosevelt in 1917 managed implement his to plan of raising volunteers to fight in World War I (which came to naught in actual history). Roosevelt blackmailed President Woodrow Wilson, threatening to run again for the Presidency in 1920 and/or to go to France under a British or French commission, if not getting an American one. With the President's reluctant authorization, Roosevelt did raise a revived force of Rough Riders and took it to France, but Wilson ordered General Pershing keep them away from the front and avoid any chance of Roosevelt getting killed. Disobeying orders and determined to recreate his glorious moment of San Juan Hill, Roosevelt led his men to a completely futile and suicidal head-on attack on entrenched German machine-gun positions, getting all of them (including himself) killed. On hearing of his end, President Wilson said "He was either a Hero or a Fool, either way I hope we have no more like him".
- In the alternate history world state depicted in H. G. Wells' A Modern Utopia, Theodore Roosevelt is arrested by police for his "disruptive influence". The rulers of this Utopian society consider Roosevelt to be "unstable" and unfit to be entrusted with any position of authority.
- On the online timeline of the 2004 mockumentary CSA: The Confederate States of America, Theodore Roosevelt served in the Spanish–American War in the Battle of San Juan Hill as part of the Rough Riders much like he does in reality. A journal excerpt describes the assault he led up Kettle Hill, "With a pistol in one hand an a saber in the other, he spurred his mount forward. His face grew flushed; his glasses clouded with steam; a wide grin covered his face. He saw the Spanish fleeing before him. He fired at one of them, who fell as neatly as a jackrabbit". The alternate version of the Spanish–American War would spark a resurgence in the Manifest Destiny and the Confederacy's continued expansion south that would continue well into the 1920s and would include all of the Caribbean, Mexico, Central and South America as part of the nation's conquered territories. Theodore Roosevelt would eventually become Confederate President after 1901.
- In S.M. Stirling's series Tales From the Black Chamber, Theodore Roosevelt is elected again to the Presidency in 1912 after William Howard Taft died shortly before the 1912 Republican National Convention, allowing him to win the Republican nomination, and it is him rather than Woodrow Wilson who takes the United States into World War I. Also, in this alternative history, Imperial Germany has far more powerful weapons that those it had in actual history, with a real ability to strike across the Atlantic and kill tens of thousands of American citizens. To foil such plots, President Roosevelt relies especially on the band of dedicated secret agents known as The Black Circle.
- In the alternate history short story "Compadres" by S.M. Stirling collected in the anthology Alternate Generals II (2002) edited by Harry Turtledove, The American territory of annexation following the end of the Mexican–American War in 1848 included Chihuahua. Decades later, Pancho Villa would become a Senator of the State of Chihuahua and is later the running mate of President Theodore Roosevelt (who still served as president as he did in reality) in the 1904 presidential election.

=== Richard Russell Jr. ===
- In one of the parallel universes featured in Warlords of Utopia by Lance Parkin, the Dixiecrat Richard Russell became president in the 1940s and kept the United States out of World War II, leading to Axis victory.
