= Gather 'Round (TV series) =

Educational TV series

Gather 'Round was an educational series syndicated on numerous PBS stations from September 1, 1978, until January 1, 1979, broadcast in repeats into the early-1980s. The series was a production of CTI/Glad and was shown mainly during weekday in-school telecasts. The programs generally ran for 15 minutes or less. They were hosted/narrated by Paul M Lally and featured the charcoal drawings of Rae Owings. As Lally told stories, Owings would draw pictures with a charcoal pencil, illustrating the story as it was being told. Lally and Owings were also responsible for behind the scenes production work on other shows such as Cover to Cover (produced by WETA-TV), and The Word Shop.
