= American Empire: The Center Cannot Hold =

Book by Harry Turtledove

- First edition (US)
- Author: Harry Turtledove
- Cover artist: Big Dot Design
- Language: English
- Series: American Empire
- Genre: Alternate history novel
- Publisher: Del Rey Books
- Publication date: June 25, 2002
- Publication place: United States
- Media type: Print (Hardcover & Paperback)
- Pages: 512
- ISBN: 0-345-44421-3
- OCLC: 49952193
- Preceded by: American Empire: Blood and Iron
- Followed by: American Empire: The Victorious Opposition

American Empire: The Center Cannot Hold is the second book in the American Empire alternate history series by Harry Turtledove. It takes place during the period of the Roaring Twenties and the Great Depression (specifically from 1924 to March 4, 1934). During this era in Turtledove's Southern Victory world, the Confederate States of America, stretching from Sonora to Virginia, is led by Whigs (with the fascist Freedom Party gaining more and more power) while the United States of America (which has been occupying Canada, Newfoundland, The Bahamas, Bermuda, and the Sandwich Islands) is controlled by Socialists.

The title is derived from the apocalyptic vision appearing in Yeats' poem The Second Coming: "Things fall apart; the centre cannot hold; / Mere anarchy is loosed upon the world, / The blood-dimmed tide is loosed, and everywhere / The ceremony of innocence is drowned; / The best lack all conviction, while the worst / Are full of passionate intensity."

== Plot summary ==
The new medium of "the wireless" (TL-191's name for a radio) offers novel ways for politicians to reach the people. Jake Featherston is the first politician to realize its potential, and soon people sitting in their homes can hear his raspy, thundery voice shouting from their radio sets, telling them the "truth" about the Yankees, Whigs, and Black Southerners. Even with this broadened appeal to the masses, the Freedom Party's hopes ebb further with Featherston's defeat at the polls in 1927 against incumbent Whig Burton Mitchel III. The Confederate people are just starting to enjoy the fruits of peace and prosperity, and the War and black uprisings are coming to be seen as part of the past, despite Featherston and his stalwarts doing their utmost to keep them alive in the collective memory. Things change when, in early 1929, the world's stock markets crash and financial and economic depression results.

In the 1928 US Presidential Election, Socialist Vice President Hosea Blackford and his running mate Hiram Johnson defeat Democratic candidate Calvin Coolidge by a narrow margin after finally taking the electoral votes from Pennsylvania and New Jersey. Blackford also carries the electoral votes from New York, Ohio, Indiana, Wisconsin, Colorado, and California. Coolidge is able to capture all six of the New England states (including his home and birth states of Massachusetts and Vermont), Kentucky, Houston, Kansas, Montana, Idaho, and Nevada. It was a closer race than the 1924 election had been, but Coolidge ultimately conceded to Blackford over the telephone. The two would meet for a rematch in the following election four years later.

When the Great Depression occurs, Burton Mitchel III is blamed in the Confederacy. In the U.S. which came out of the 1920s with a booming economy and with the Canadian revolt having been crushed in 1925, newly elected President Hosea Blackford takes the heat, with shantytowns and slums being named "Blackfordburghs". Millions lose their jobs, and in Utah, (under military occupation since 1916), a fanatical Mormon sniper guns down Governor-General John J. Pershing. When Japan and the U.S. go to war in 1932 after Japan is caught smuggling weapons to Pacific Canada (the occupied Canadian province of British Columbia) by the U.S.S. Remembrance, and Japanese bombers attack Los Angeles. In the 1932 presidential election, President Blackford is defeated by Calvin Coolidge and his running mate Herbert Hoover in a landslide. However Coolidge is never able to take office. On January 5, 1933, he dies of a heart attack about a month before he could take office. (In real life, Former President Coolidge died of a heart attack on the same date.) Vice President-Elect Hoover assumes the presidency, practicing Coolidge's campaign policy of government non-intervention in the economy.

At the same time in the C.S.A., whole cities are echoing to the boot-steps of marching Freedom Party Stalwarts, their ranks flowing once more with angry citizens, preparing for Election Day 1933. Jake Featherston attacks the Mitchel Administration with the venom and hate, blaming Mitchel for the Crash, and condemning his ineffectual response to the floods that devastated the Mississippi River valley in 1927. Confederates respond well to Featherston's rants. During the 1933 Confederate States Presidential Election, Featherston and his running mate Willy Knight defeat Whig candidate Samuel Longstreet and Radical Liberal candidate Cordell Hull. On taking the oath of office on March 4, 1934, the world holds its breath: "Freedom" is on the march.

In Europe, the storm clouds are also beginning to gather. The final vestiges of the Bolshevik Communist revolution were crushed by 1927; among the last holdouts was the Volga town of Tsaritsyn under the "Man of Steel" and his second in command the "Hammer". Under Tsar Mikhail II, Russia remains a primarily agricultural, backward country. Frequent anti-Semitic pogroms and foreign loans manage to deflect further restlessness but the latter were a contributing factor in the 1929 crash when Austria-Hungary demanded the repayment of a loan that Russia was unable to fulfill.

Austria-Hungary itself remains a united empire but only the Austrians and Hungarians feel any loyalty to the Habsburg Dynasty monarchs. In fact, the multi-ethnic federation seems to be held together only by German financial and military aid. The Ottoman Empire also appears to be in the same boat, undertaking the genocide of its Armenian population. Despite strong censure from the United States, and more lukewarm protests from Berlin, the Turks continue the genocide until the Ottoman Empire is nearly devoid of Armenians.

Kaiser Wilhelm II rules a strong Germany and his troops continue to occupy Belgium, Ukraine, and the puppet Kingdom of Poland, but post-war relations with the U.S. soured to the point that many people on both sides of the Atlantic believed that Germany and the United States would someday be engaged in a full-fledged war. The Business Collapse puts an end to that, however, and the old allies reassert themselves once more.

After the Third Republic is overthrown around 1930, France finds itself under Action Française and a new monarchy under King Charles XI, who begins talking about the return of Alsace-Lorraine to French rule. In the United Kingdom, the fascist-inspired "Silver Shirts" under Oswald Mosley hold similar views, and support Action Française, though they never become more than a minority in the British Parliament. Italy never comes under Benito Mussolini's Fascist rule but, other than this, little information is provided about its history in this alternative timeline.

In the Pacific, Japan is far from quiet. Prior to the Pacific War with the United States, Japan pressured both France and the Netherlands to cede Indochina and the East Indies, respectively, with proper compensation. Britain fears that its Pacific colonies of Hong Kong, Malaya, Singapore, and possibly India will also be invaded and annexed by Japan; however, Japan shows no interest in doing so. Japan also gains much influence in the Nationalists' Republic of China during this period and seems to have established a puppet state of Manchukuo in the northeast of Manchuria as well. This empire is in addition to Japan's possessions in the Philippines and Guam, which were "liberated" from Spain in the early years of the 20th century (eliminating our history of American temporary colonization).

== Work ==
- American empire--the center cannot hold. Random House, Inc. 2002. ISBN 978-0-345-44421-9.

== Literary significance and reception ==
Roland Green in his review for Booklist described this novel as "another harrowing and literate installment in Turtledove's standard-setting alternate history". Jeff Guinn of the Fort Worth Star-Telegram described the plot as "reasonably intelligent, with solid premises".
