= Settling Accounts: The Grapple =

Book by Harry Turtledove

- First edition (US)
- Author: Harry Turtledove
- Cover artist: Big Dot Design
- Language: English
- Series: Settling Accounts series
- Genre: Alternate History
- Publisher: Del Rey Books
- Publication date: July 2006
- Publication place: United States
- Media type: Print (Paperback & Hardback)
- ISBN: 0-345-45725-0
- OCLC: 62697178
- Dewey Decimal: 813/.54 22
- LC Class: PS3570.U76 S475 2006
- Preceded by: Settling Accounts: Drive to the East
- Followed by: Settling Accounts: In at the Death

Settling Accounts: The Grapple by Harry Turtledove is the third book in the Settling Accounts tetralogy, an alternate history setting of World War II known as the Second Great War in North America. It is part of the Southern Victory, which supposes that the Confederate States of America won the American Civil War. It takes place in the Southern Victory Series Earth in 1943.

== Plot summary ==
U.S. General Irving Morrell's campaign to drive Confederate forces out of Pennsylvania and Ohio is successful, and now pushes them through Kentucky, Tennessee, and ultimately Georgia. At the Battle of Chattanooga, American forces land paratroopers on top of Missionary Ridge and Lookout Mountain, rather than fight their way to the top in hard-fought battles. Having gained Chattanooga, Morell seems bent on driving to the Atlantic Ocean through Georgia, thus cutting the Confederate territory in two. Confederate General George Patton, does less well on the defense than he did in the attack on Ohio two years before, his pugnacious instincts making him squander irreplaceable resources on futile attempts at counter-attack.

The murder of blacks in gas chambers at Camp Determination in Texas continues, while U.S. General Abner Dowling's Eleventh Army attempts to attack it and shut it down. With only marginal forces at his disposal, this proves difficult. Dowling does send air support to bomb the railways on which horribly crowded cattle cars full of blacks are brought in. However, the advance takes too long; the sound of distant U.S. artillery had aroused some hope among the condemned black inmates, but when the U.S. forces finally arrive, they find nothing but enormous mass graves with not a single survivor, the extermination operation having been transferred to an "improved camp" in Eastern Texas. Among the innumerable victims is Scipio. Despite this setback, Confederate blacks continue to find ways to resist. In Richmond, the Confederate capital, blacks rebel, seeking not to save their lives but to die with weapons in hand and exact a price from their murderers. Meanwhile, fighting continues among black guerrilla bands in the Georgia countryside.

As the war rages, the race between American and Confederate physicists to build a "uranium (i.e., nuclear fission) bomb" continues. The Confederates desperately try to recover from Confederate President Jake Featherston's strategic blunder of initially not taking the bomb seriously and having held up research for over a year. They launch an air raid on the U.S. nuclear project in the state of Washington, to which the Americans reply in kind by bombing Washington University at Lexington, Virginia, the center of Confederate nuclear research. Meanwhile, Germany seems ahead of both the North American powers in the construction of a uranium bomb.

On the European Front, German and Austrian forces are gradually pushing the French, British and Russian forces back. Irish and Serb uprisings continue, and Ukraine remains a battleground for both sides. The Russians are unable to concentrate on Alaska, though it never gets invaded due to the fact that the US and Russia were engaged with other enemies and saw no reason to divert resources to a territory that is seen of no value. In Virginia, ground fighting seems largely quiet, but both sides are able to launch air strikes against the other, although the Confederates are not able to launch attacks quite as often due to heavy losses. The Mormon rebellion in Utah is suppressed (for the third time) and the U.S. characters debate the morality of various ways of dealing with the problem again. It seems a set of contingency plans to deport all Mormons from Utah, possibly to the Sandwich Islands, are drawn up. Meanwhile, the Canadian rebellion is fully active, prompting units which had been fighting in Utah to be transferred to Canada. The troops from the U.S.-backed Republic of Quebec are not numerous enough or motivated enough to hold off the Canadian guerrillas. Fighting in Sequoyah appears to be back-and-forth, with both sides sabotaging the oil wells there. A general advance seems to be made in Arkansas, and U.S. forces are pressing the offensive in the C.S. states of Sonora and Chihuahua.

Allegiances at the top of the Confederate government are beginning to show strain as losses to the Confederacy increase. There is pronounced tension between Brigadier General Clarence Potter and President Jake Featherston, Camp Determination administrator Jefferson Pinkard and Confederate Attorney General Ferdinand Koenig, and between Koenig and Featherston. Featherston engages in shouting matches with his commanding officers over their tactics. Angered with his generals, Featherston puts all his faith in "wonder weapons" to win the war. Most ominously, despite the increasingly desperate military situation, Featherston continues to divert considerable resources to the extermination program as being justified and necessary, since "The War Against the Negroes" is a most important goal which must be "fought" and "won" by total extermination and making the Confederate territories "Negro-free".

At sea, the Imperial Japanese threat to the Sandwich Islands ends with a naval victory at Midway, and American forces retake that island. Neither side has any real desire to pursue the war further, and there are strong hints that the Japanese might attack the British possessions of Hong Kong, Singapore, Malaya, and even India. The U.S. Navy also smuggles arms to a nascent rebellion in the Confederate State of Cuba, in which a teenage Fidel Castro participates. The United States is able to recapture Bermuda in a costly action and is threatening to move naval forces to the South Atlantic, to cut off food shipments from Argentina to the United Kingdom. U.S. President Charles W. La Follette asks the Confederate States for unconditional surrender. Featherston replies with a defiant speech, and launches two long-range rockets from bases in Virginia onto Philadelphia. Damage from the rocket-bombs is light, but the psychological damage is much heavier.

== Publication history ==
The Grapple is the third book in the tetralogy, following 2005's Settling Accounts: Drive to the East and 2004's Settling Accounts: Return Engagement, and preceding Settling Accounts: In at the Death, released in 2007. It was released in the United States on July 25, 2006. The book was released in the United Kingdom on October 5, 2006.

== Reception ==
Publishers Weekly gave the book a mixed review, saying that "One may question the appropriateness of using the Holocaust as a springboard for an entertainment" but that "While somewhat repetitious and a bit preachy in spots, Turtledove's latest proves that third time is the charm". Stranger Horizons also gave the book a mixed review stating that the book was "extremely formulaic" and that characters "often repeat familiar exposition and stock phrases as if to make sure that they reach their five-page quota", but that " what appeals most about Turtledove's writing is the strength of his concepts, which more than survive his inconsistent handling of them".
