= Cover to Cover (1965 TV program) =

Educational television series

Cover to Cover is an educational program broadcast on public television in the United States and Canada from the 1960s to the 1990s. Its host, John Robbins, would introduce young readers to one or two books, then draw scenes as a portion of the book was read. Robbins would then encourage his viewers to find the book in question and read the rest of the story. The program was also known by several other titles, always following the same general format.

== Format ==
At the beginning of each segment, the genial Robbins, a former elementary school teacher, would introduce a book, generally aimed at readers aged nine to twelve, corresponding to grades 4, 5, and 6 in the United States. Robbins or another narrator would then read an episode from the book, while the camera would shift to film of Robbins illustrating a scene from the passage being read. Using colored pencils, Robbins would bring the story to life for the viewer; as the picture was completed, the passage being read would generally end with a cliffhanger. Other illustrations, including watercolor paintings, were provided by artists such as Jeanne Turner and Gloria Kamen. At the end of each program, Robbins would encourage the viewer to find the book at a library and read the rest of the story.

Some programs featured a single book, while others profiled two books, and two illustrations from shorter passages. Millions of schoolchildren were first exposed to great books, as well as art and illustration, through Robbins' work. Many of the books were Newbery Medal winners. Among the books profiled over the years were: Little House in the Big Woods, Call It Courage, Misty of Chincoteague, Caddie Woodlawn, A Bear Called Paddington, The Witch of Blackbird Pond, Island of the Blue Dolphins, The Cricket in Times Square, A Wrinkle in Time, The Mouse and the Motorcycle, A Wizard of Earthsea, Sounder, The Toothpaste Millionaire, The Dark is Rising, Bridge to Terabithia, and Tuck Everlasting. Narrators included Paul Lally and Jane Symons.

== Production ==
The first version of Cover to Cover was a locally produced program airing in Washington, D.C., where Robbins lived, in 1965. Two years later, a group in Bloomington, Indiana, decided to produce the program for national distribution. Ray Gladfelter served as the producer for this and subsequent series. In 1973, Gladfelter's company, the "Instructional Television Cooperative" (ITVC) assumed production, and the first color episodes were filmed. Subsequent series were produced by Gladfelter's company, which was renamed "Children's Television International" (CTI) in 1979. Although the same format was used, the title changed frequently, and the program was variously known as The Book Bird, Storybound, and Readit. Later productions used variations of the original title: Books from Cover to Cover, More Books from Cover to Cover, and Read on: Cover to Cover. The last series was produced in 1996.

All of these programs were produced under the auspices of the Greater Washington Educational Television Association, or WETA. They were distributed on public television stations throughout the United States and Canada, and were a fixture of children's programming blocks on PBS for many years.
