= John Robbins (illustrator) =

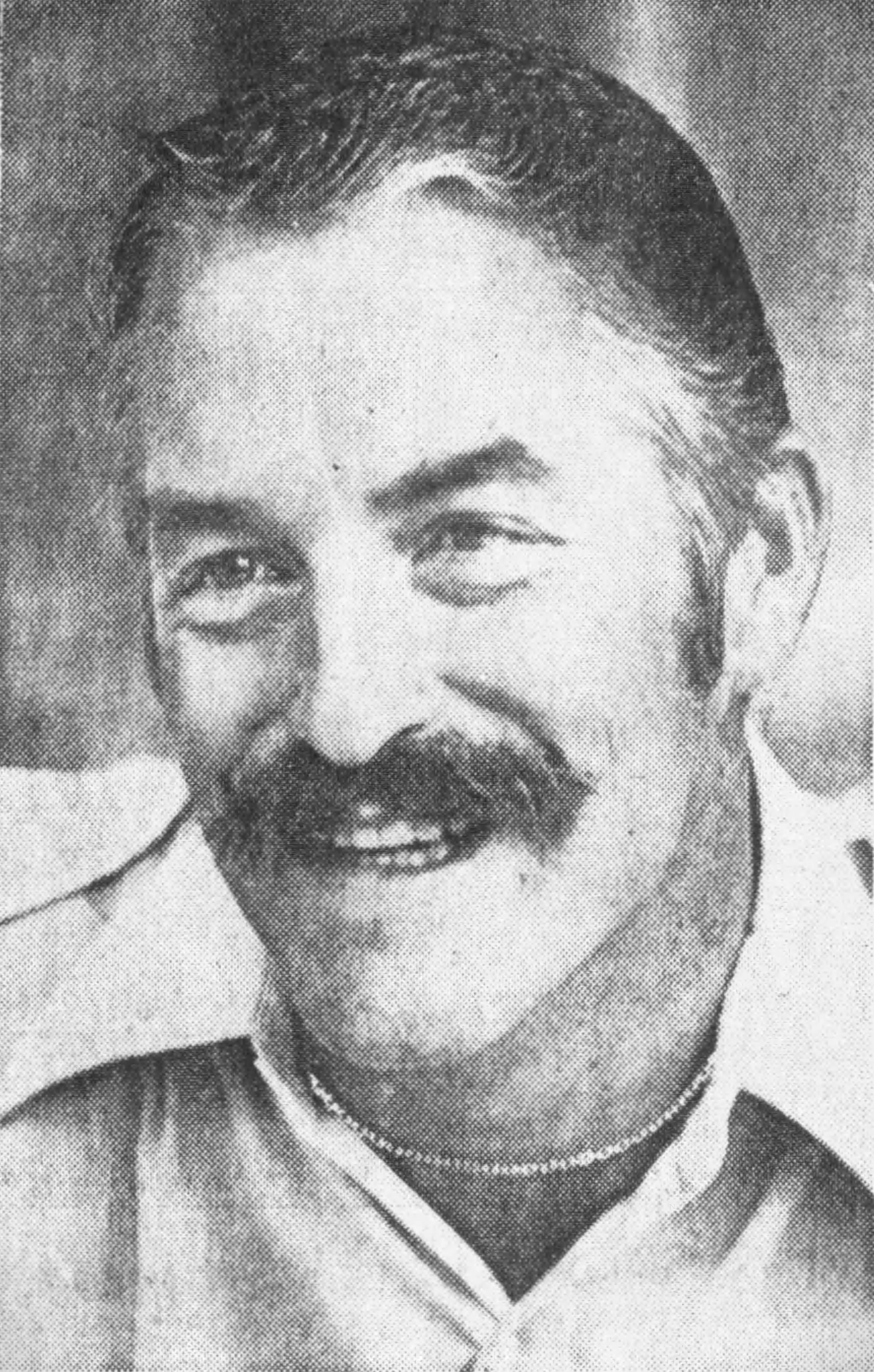
- Robbins in 1977
- Born: John Nelson Robbins, Jr. January 18, 1938; Greensboro, North Carolina, U.S.
- Died: December 11, 2016 (aged 78); U.S.
- Occupations: Illustrator and educator
- Known for: Hosting the television program Cover to Cover from the 1960s to the 1990s

John Nelson Robbins, Jr. (1938–2016) was an illustrator and educator, who hosted the public television program Cover to Cover, aired in the United States and Canada from the 1960s to the 1990s.

== Background ==
Robbins was born at Greensboro, North Carolina on January 18, 1938, and studied art and music at East Carolina University. During summer breaks, he played the piano in various jazz ensembles. In 1959, he took a job as a fifth-grade teacher at Forestville Elementary School in Prince George's County, Maryland.

== Collaboration with WETA ==
In 1962, Robbins was hired by the Greater Washington Educational Television Association (WETA), with the title of "Studio Teacher of Language Arts", in order to develop educational programming for elementary school students. Robbins collaborated with WETA for twenty-six years.

In his signature program, Cover to Cover, Robbins would introduce young readers to one or two books, from which he or another narrator would read excerpts. As the story unfolded, Robbins illustrated a scene from the passage being read, bringing the story to life using colored pencils or other media. Viewers watched the picture develop as they listened to the story, usually ending with a cliffhanger or another dramatic point in the narrative. Robbins would then display the original book, and encourage children to visit the library, and read the books in question. The original series was followed by others with the same format, but varying titles, including More Books from Cover to Cover, Readit, Storybound, and The Book Bird. The series were broadcast on PBS stations across the country during their original run, and in reruns until the 1990s.

Robbins created other programming for WETA, including Portraits: The Americans, featuring biographical profiles of figures from American history, Across Cultures, about people and cultures from around the world, The Short Story, aimed at high school students, a production of the ballet The Unicorn, the Gorgon, and the Manticore, and another of Gian Carlo Menotti's opera The Old Maid and the Thief.

Robbins received numerous awards for his work in educational television. In 1966, he received two National Educational Television Awards, for Cover to Cover and a poetry series, Mr. Smith and Other Nonsense. Robbins received two awards from the National Academy of Television Arts and Sciences for programs that he produced and hosted in 1969 and 1970, and he was honored with a Producer's Lifetime Achievement Award by the National Academy for School Television and Video in 1992.

== Other endeavors ==
Robbins traveled around the country, speaking to elementary school students about reading and using their imaginations to create their own stories. In 1989, he published The Tooth Fairy is Broke, a book aimed at children aged five to seven.

In a 1978 interview, Robbins said, "I also do a lot of traveling. I go and spend several weeks in one state, speaking to librarians, kids, and college groups." His hobbies included birdwatching, playing the piano, sailing, and water skiing.

Robbins died on December 11, 2016, following an extended illness.
