= American Empire: The Victorious Opposition =

2003 book by Harry Turtledove

- First edition
- Author: Harry Turtledove
- Cover artist: Big Dot Design
- Language: English
- Series: American Empire
- Genre: Alternate history novel
- Publisher: Del Rey Books
- Publication date: July 29, 2003
- Publication place: United States
- Media type: Print (Hardcover & Paperback)
- Pages: 512
- ISBN: 0-345-44423-X
- OCLC: 51817182
- Dewey Decimal: 813/.54 21
- LC Class: PS3570.U76 A84 2003
- Preceded by: American Empire: The Center Cannot Hold
- Followed by: Settling Accounts: Return Engagement

American Empire: The Victorious Opposition is the third and final book in the American Empire alternate history series by Harry Turtledove, and the seventh in the Southern Victory series of books.

== Plot summary ==
The book covers the period March 5, 1934 (the day after Jake Featherston's inauguration as President of the Confederate States) to June 22, 1941 (the commencement of Operation Blackbeard).

The United States are able to end a war with Japan, but are beginning to prepare for a fourth war against its southern neighbor—but slowly and reluctantly, as the memories of Great War carnage make the population skeptical of calls for increased military spending. In the Confederacy, Featherston and his fascist Freedom Party enact sweeping changes to all aspects of life, including purging and expanding the Army, abolishing the Supreme Court, and using concentration camps to kill off Whig and Radical Liberal politicians before using them to eliminate the black population of the Confederate States. To solidify popular support, Featherston makes good on his campaign promises to mechanize Confederate agriculture and bring electricity to communities across the CSA, including an equivalent of the TVA. These measures also have the effect of war preparations, ensuring that the C.S. will fight their next conflict as a full-fledged, advanced industrial nation. The old-style, somewhat complacent Confederate elites—the planter class—are eclipsed in political life by the mass-based, militaristic Freedom Party, driven by Featherston's burning vision of national greatness and revenge.

As these changes are taking place, representatives of the former Confederate states of Kentucky and Houston along with Sequoyah begin calling for a return to the Confederacy, with Confederate partisans in Houston launching an armed uprising against the U.S. Army. Union President Al Smith (who defeated Herbert Hoover and his running mate William Borah in the 1936 Presidential Election) allows himself to be swayed by the peace factions in the U.S. and gives in to the Confederate territorial demands. Smith is also able to win reelection in 1940 over Democratic candidate Robert A. Taft by a narrow margin. Republican Party candidate Wendell Willkie comes in third place in the election, carrying the electoral votes from his home state of Indiana. On January 7, 1941, plebiscites are held and Kentucky and Houston vote to return to the Confederacy with Houston also rejoining Texas. Featherston promises not to remilitarize them, or to ask for Sequoyah (which due to a massive number of white settlers, voted pro-U.S.) or other former C.S. territory such as the annexed areas of northern Virginia north of the Rappahannock River, northeastern Arkansas, and northwestern Sonora. Within weeks, Featherston breaks his promise and plants his modernized and expanded Confederate Army on the Ohio River, convincing Smith that the time to face Featherston down has finally come.

Tensions rise in Europe when Germany's longtime ruler Wilhelm II dies on June 4, 1941. The new Kaiser Wilhelm III refuses to return the former French territory of Alsace-Lorraine that France's ruling party Action Française had demanded. The United Kingdom, France and the Confederacy soon declare war on Germany, with Russia joining in days later.

With war breaking out in Europe, Jake Featherston feels it is time to have his revenge against his greatest enemy: the United States of America. On the first day of summer in 1941, he orders Operation Blackbeard to begin. The next day — June 22, 1941 — the Confederate States of America bring the war to North America with a surprise attack on Philadelphia and invasion of southern Ohio.

== Literary significance and reception ==
Jackie Cassada in her review for Library Journal called it a "solid choice". Peter Canon of Publishers Weekly said that this volume of Turtledove's saga "may be the strongest and most compelling since the opener". Roland Green reviewing for Booklist agreed that this was the most powerful volume in the series describing the novel as "busy, to be sure, but almost impossible to praise too highly".
