= Southern Victory =

Series by Harry Turtledove

- Author: Harry Turtledove
- Country: United States
- Language: English
- Genre: Alternate history
- Published: 1997–2007

The Southern Victory series or Timeline-191 is a series of eleven alternate history novels by author Harry Turtledove, beginning with How Few Remain (1997) and published over a decade. In the series, the Confederate States defeats the United States of America in the American Civil War, making good its attempt at secession and becoming an independent nation. Subsequent books build on this alternate timeline through the mid-1940s.

The secondary name is derived from General Robert E. Lee's Special Order 191, which detailed the C.S. Army of Northern Virginia's invasion of the Union through the border state of Maryland in September 1862. Union soldiers found a copy of the order on September 13, which helped General George B. McClellan of the Army of the Potomac prevail over Lee at the Battle of Antietam. Turtledove creates a divergence by positing that the Union does not find the order.

== Books in the series ==
The Southern Victory series consists of 11 books, published between 1997 and 2007. The first book in the series is How Few Remain, and the remaining 10 form three sub-series: The Great War (1998–2000) trilogy, The American Empire trilogy (2001–2003), and The Settling Accounts (2003–2007) tetralogy. (The author changed some aspects of the timeline and narrative between How Few Remain and the remainder of the series, producing some inconsistencies.)

- How Few Remain (1997)
- The "Great War" Trilogy
  - American Front (1998)
  - Walk in Hell (1999)
  - Breakthroughs (2000)
- The "American Empire" Trilogy
  - Blood and Iron (2001)
  - The Center Cannot Hold (2002)
  - The Victorious Opposition (2003)
- The "Settling Accounts" Tetralogy
  - Return Engagement (2004)
  - Drive to the East (2005)
  - The Grapple (2006)
  - In at the Death (2007)

== Fictional chronology ==
After recovering the lost copy of Special Order 191 before it falls into Union hands, Confederate forces catch George B. McClellan's Union Army by surprise and destroy it on the banks of the Susquehanna River in 1862. Occupying Philadelphia, the Confederacy gain diplomatic recognition from the United Kingdom and France, who mediate a peace deal by which the Confederacy achieves independence. President Abraham Lincoln considers his failure to issue the Emancipation Proclamation, along with the possibility of the U.S. finding its own European allies in the future.

The United States cannot afford Alaska, but proceeds with its war against the natives of the Great Plains. Meanwhile, the Confederacy admits Kentucky, Sequoyah, and Cuba as new states, and negotiates the purchase of Sonora and Chihuahua from Mexico in 1881. Republican President James G. Blaine uses this as a casus belli to declare a renewed war, drawing Britain and France back into the conflict. The Union, despite its advantage in manpower and resources, lacks competent leadership, and struggles to take Confederate territory while also facing a revolt in Utah. The Louisville campaign devolves into trench warfare, while Britain and France shell U.S. ports and northern Maine is annexed to New Brunswick. The Union capitulates in early 1882, recognizing the Confederate acquisitions, while the Republicans are soon voted out of government.

In the wake of the war's loss, Lincoln leads his loyal faction of the Republican Party into merging with the nascent Socialist Party of America, changing US politics as this becomes the second major party, supplanting the Republicans afterward. Over the rest of the decade, manumission of slaves is nominally implemented throughout the Confederacy ― easing relations with Britain and France, which had both abolished slavery much earlier — although the black population continues to live in apartheid-like conditions. The U.S. secures an alliance with the new German Empire amid a national atmosphere of revanchism.

=== Great War ===
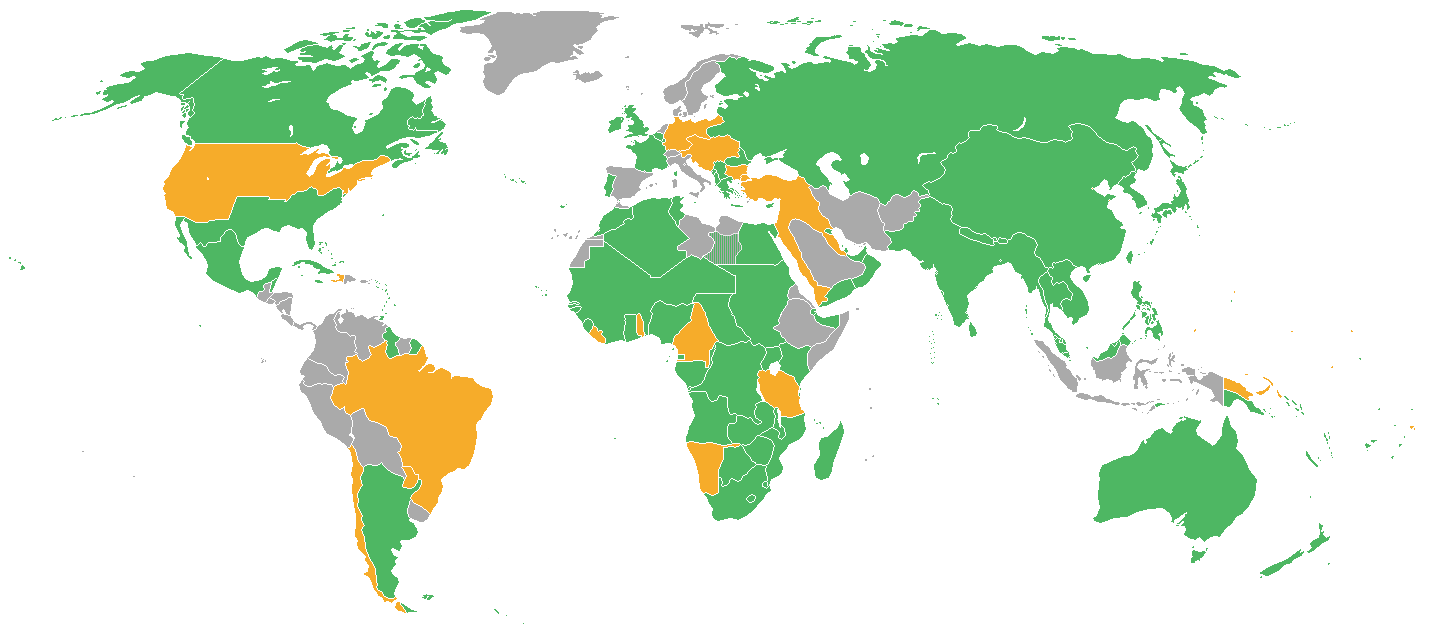
Map of the world with the participants in The Great War in the Southern Victory history. The "Entente" (sometimes referred to as "The Allies") are depicted in green, the "Central Powers" in orange, and neutral countries in grey.

Upon the assassination of Archduke Franz Ferdinand, Britain, France, and Russia go to war with Germany and Austria-Hungary. Presidents Theodore Roosevelt and Woodrow Wilson order the U.S. and C.S. militaries to mobilize following their respective allies, and fighting soon breaks out. Industrialized warfare and the absence of European intervention favors the Union side, and much of the Confederate officer corps is made up of heirs of great 19th-century generals with no particular talent of their own. An invasion of Maryland and Pennsylvania overruns Washington, D.C., but is unable to take Baltimore, while the Union launches attacks on Sonora and Canada, along with the capture of the British Sandwich Islands. As winter falls, a stalemate settles in across trench lines in Kentucky, Pennsylvania, Virginia, Manitoba, Southern Ontario, and the St. Lawrence River. The U.S. faces another rebellion in Utah and the C.S. faces a black socialist revolt, which takes a year to subdue.

In 1916 a new technical advance is introduced: the "barrel". George Armstrong Custer develops a doctrine for armored cavalry, but his tactics are not adopted and the first offensive is a failure. The U.S. successfully advances in Canada and defends Hawaii in a large naval engagement; the C.S. hopes that attrition and war weariness might knock the U.S. out, but pro-war President Roosevelt wins reelection, and the Confederacy is forced to begin recruiting black troops with a promise of civil rights after the war. The following year sees breakthroughs in Tennessee and Quebec using Custer's massed barrel tactics, while a simultaneous advance in Virginia recaptures a devastated Washington. With Union troops approaching its capital, the C.S. sues for peace, with it suffering the same fate as Germany in our timeline. Territorial changes include Kentucky and the western half of Texas (henceforth known as Houston) being annexed into the U.S. as states. The C.S. States of Arkansas, Sonora, and Virginia lose territory to the U.S. states of Missouri, New Mexico, and West Virginia respectively, and Sequoyah is placed under occupation by U.S. forces. Canada barring the U.S.-allied Republic of Quebec is annexed by the U.S. under occupation. In Europe, army mutinies lead to France's exit from the war; Italy never enters it, while Russia is wracked by revolution. Brazil also joins the Central Powers along with Chile and Paraguay against Argentina, and increasingly isolated, Britain capitulates as well, ending the war.

=== American Empire ===
Flag of the Confederate States Freedom Party.

Jubilant at having finally beaten the Confederates, the U.S. soon encounters strikes and labor unrest, fueling political gains by the Socialist Party. The Confederacy experiences hyperinflation and a growth in reactionary extremism, with ex-sergeant Jake Featherston gaining popularity via his tirades against the "stab in the back". He comes to lead the C.S. Freedom Party, reorganizing it around his own ambitions with a loyal paramilitary wing and a radio propaganda program. However, Featherston loses several bids for office, and a Freedom Party assassination of Confederate President Wade Hampton V drains much of his support until the crash of 1929. With the ranks of his party swelled by popular unrest, Featherston finally becomes President in 1934, and sets about establishing control over the government, the police force, and the expanding army. He demands the return of former Confederate territory in forms of Kentucky, Sequoyah and Houston; after negotiating for plebiscites to be held in those states, Kentucky and Houston vote for re-admittance whilst Sequoyah votes to remain part of the United States.

Elsewhere in the world, the Great War results in independence for Quebec and Ireland, as well as other concessions by Britain; Canada falls under harsh U.S. rule while Germany sets up puppet states in Belgium, Poland, and Ukraine. Tensions seem to be rising between the two powers until the depression hits. The Russian, Austro-Hungarian, and Ottoman Empires remain intact but fragile; Japan builds an empire in east Asia and carries on a brief war with the U.S. Like the Confederacy, Britain and France witness the rise of reactionary regimes. In Britain, the 1935 general election results in the creation of a Conservative-Silvershirt coalition headed by Winston Churchill and Oswald Mosley, and in France Action Française overthrows the Third Republic and re-establishes the monarchy under Charles XI. When France demands the return of Alsace-Lorraine and the new Kaiser refuses, Britain, France, Russia, and the Confederacy declare war on Germany. On June 22, 1941, Featherston launches his surprise invasion of the U.S.

=== Settling Accounts ===
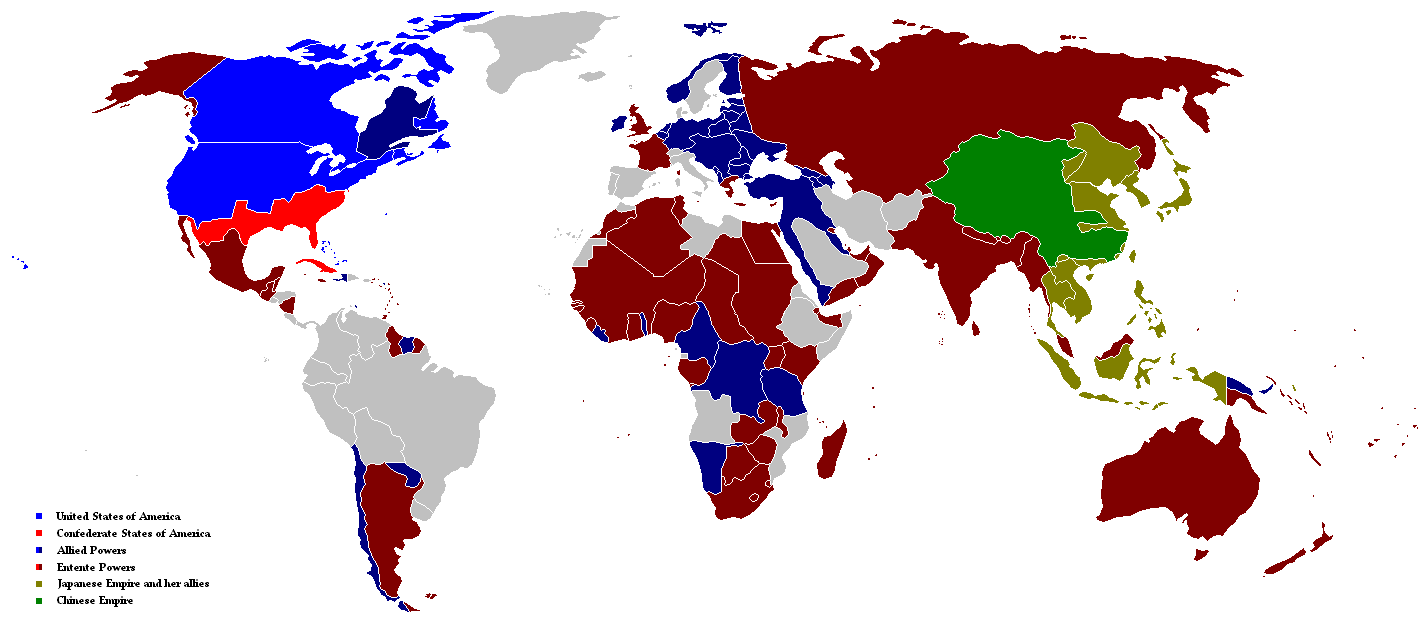
World map showing participants in the "Second Great War". The Entente are depicted in brown, the C.S. in red, the Central Powers in blue, the Japanese Empire in dark gray, the Chinese Empire in green, and neutral countries in grey.

Against Union expectations, Confederate forces under George Patton drive into Ohio under cover of massive bombing raids, cutting U.S. industry off from its raw materials, but the front soon stalls there and in Virginia. The U.S. Navy suffers reverses against the Royal Navy and Imperial Japanese Navy. However, despite U.S. President Al Smith getting killed during a Confederate bombing raid on Philadelphia, the U.S. does not surrender. In response, the Confederacy launches a major offensive aimed at Pittsburgh, where its army is surrounded and annihilated in urban fighting. Meanwhile, the Confederacy begins "population reductions" against its black population, using poison gas at camps in Louisiana and Texas, which are forced to evacuate as U.S. troops advance. Using blitzkrieg-like tactics, the U.S. Army is also able to push through Kentucky and Tennessee toward Atlanta.

In Europe, the Germans lose Ukraine and the Left Bank of the Rhine, but defend East Prussia and Poland. Britain occupies Ireland, but its Norwegian campaign fails spectacularly. Backed by Austria-Hungary and Bulgaria, Germany begins counter-offensives in 1942. With both Russia and Austria-Hungary facing ethnic uprisings, the German Army is able to win at Kyiv and threaten Petrograd, as well as retake the Low Countries. Having won the race for a nuclear weapon, Germany destroys Petrograd with an atomic bomb; as more belligerents acquire the technology, the list of cities targeted grows to include Philadelphia, Newport News, Charleston, Paris, Hamburg, London, Norwich, and Brighton. Russia, France, and Britain sue for peace.

With Texas seceding, Patton surrendering in Alabama, and Featherston killed by a black guerrilla while trying to escape, the Confederacy surrenders unconditionally. U.S. forces hold trials for crimes against humanity and take extreme measures against the remaining bands of guerrillas, while generally aided by the scattered remaining black population. In 1945, new President Thomas E. Dewey pledges to reintegrate the southern states into the Union and to continue the alliance with Germany, while suppressing the development of nuclear weapons by their enemies France, Japan, and Russia.

== Reviews and reactions ==
Reviewer Lionel Ward notes that although the series "ends in an apparent happy ending", "integrating the Confederate territories into the United States would be an impossible mission"—"an open-ended military occupation of a very large sullen population, which would inevitably burst into rebellion sooner or later(...) A far more reasonable policy, never even considered, would have been to revive the Confederate Whig Party under US auspices and make a pragmatic agreement with a rehabilitated Confederacy". Ward concludes:

The series ends with the US holding by the tail not one tiger but two [The Confederate territories and Canada, occupied since 1917], plus a big aggressive wildcat [The Mormons in Utah]. [...] In this history, the post-1945 United States has nothing like the dominant global position it had in the equivalent period of actual history. There are several rival powers with both the means and the motive to make trouble for the US and actively foment rebellion.

== See also ==
- American Civil War alternate histories
- The Guns of the South, another Harry Turtledove-written novel dealing with a C.S. victory
