= Settling Accounts: Drive to the East =

2005 book by Harry Turtledove

- First edition (US)
- Author: Harry Turtledove
- Cover artist: Big Dot Design
- Language: English
- Series: Settling Accounts series
- Genre: Alternate History
- Publisher: Del Rey Books
- Publication date: August 2005
- Publication place: United States
- Media type: Print (Paperback & Hardback)
- ISBN: 0-345-45724-2
- OCLC: 56955875
- Dewey Decimal: 813/.6 22
- LC Class: PS3570.U76 S473 2005
- Preceded by: Settling Accounts: Return Engagement
- Followed by: Settling Accounts: The Grapple

Drive to the East is the second book in Harry Turtledove's Settling Accounts series of alternate history novels.

It is set in an analog of World War II known as the Second Great War in North America, fought between the United States and Confederate States. It was released in August 2005. It follows Return Engagement and precedes The Grapple in the tetralogy. It takes the Southern Victory Earth from 1942 to 1943.

== Plot summary ==
As the title suggests, the novel contains analogues of historical 1942 battles, such as the German drive to, and the Battle of Stalingrad. In the novel, Confederate armies in occupied Ohio drive into Pennsylvania with Pittsburgh as their objective, codenamed Operation Coalscuttle. It also involves analogues of the Battle of Midway, the Manhattan Project, and the Holocaust.

By the summer of 1942, the U.S. push under General Daniel MacArthur into northern Virginia has stalled in the face of fierce opposition. This allows General George Patton to concentrate his forces in Ohio for a renewed push into western Pennsylvania. Aided by improved armor and assault tactics, his troops quickly advance across eastern Ohio to Pittsburgh's outskirts. However Brigadier General Irving Morrell, who now commands the U.S. defense of the Ohio Front, prevents the CSA from enveloping Pittsburgh as planned and forces them into a street to street fight.

Meanwhile, Jefferson Davis Pinkard enjoys rapid advancement through the Freedom Party hierarchy as he begins to develop the machinery required to implement Jake Featherston's Final Solution to the "Negro problem". His Camp Determination is now so efficient that it is able to swallow and extinguish the entire Negro population of Jackson, Mississippi (including Richard Wright) as reprisals against local insurgents. In Augusta, Georgia's now ghettoized Negro district, Scipio, a former slave and Marxist rebel during the Great War, manages for a time to skirt the ever increasing terror descending across the CSA's Negro population. Eventually, he too is swallowed up and finds himself in a cattle car heading towards a bleak future. Elsewhere in Georgia, captured U.S. fighter pilot Jonathan Moss escapes from a POW camp and joins a small band of Negro rebels.

At sea, Lt. Sam Carsten's ship, USS Remembrance, is sunk by an Imperial Japanese carrier attack and the Sandwich Islands (our universe's Hawaii) are threatened with capture. Nevertheless, he finds himself promoted and placed in charge of a destroyer escort, where he spends time patrolling Atlantic sea lanes and engaging in special operations. George Enos Jr.'s destroyer is nearly sunk in an engagement near Japanese-held Midway due to lack of sea-borne air power. However, when two escort carriers manage to reach Oahu, the tide begins to turn. In a climactic battle, George's fleet sinks a Japanese carrier guarding Midway.

In this history, the Pacific War against Japan is treated as essentially a sideshow, getting only a trickle of resources - since the US are facing a dangerous invasion of their industrial heartland. Strategic aims in the Pacific are confined to recapturing Midway to remove the threat to the Sandwich Islands, and characters consider the idea of conducting an island-hopping war all the way to the Japanese home islands (as the US did in World War II) as an unrealistic fantasy. Also, in this history, the Philippines and Guam are long-standing and recognized possessions of the Japanese, which they had wrested from Spain during the Hispano-Japanese War between the late 1800s and early 1900s and to which the US laid no claim.

The CSA have pressured their weak ally, Emperor Francisco José II of Mexico, into reluctantly providing troops to reinforce the Coalscuttle attack. Under cover of an early November storm, General Morrell leads an armored breakthrough against the poorly equipped Mexicans protecting Patton's flank. Joining up with another salient coming out of West Virginia, he traps the bulk of Patton's army, and drives deep into Ohio. Featherston, beginning an apparent descent into madness, gives the trapped army maniacal orders to hold its ground rather than attempt a breakout. When the promised resupply by air fails, Patton is ordered to escape by air and CSA resistance near Pittsburgh collapses. The sequence of events is similar to that which led to the destruction of the German Sixth Army in Battle of Stalingrad during our timeline's World War II.

Jonathan Moss spends most of the book as a frustrated POW held at Andersonville, Georgia, under conditions unpleasant but far more tolerable than of the infamous War of Secession POW camp of the same location. He and others manage to escape after a tornado blows down the camp's fences. He and another escaped POW join a black guerrilla band whose capable leader took up the nom de guerre Spartacus. During a raid on Plains, Georgia, Moss kills Jimmy Carter, a young Confederate naval officer on leave, in front of his mother as he tries to rally the townspeople against the raiding blacks.

General Abner Dowling is transferred from the Virginia front to take up command of the 11th Army and open a new front by invading Texas, in order to prevent the Confederates from moving forces from there to reinforce the main front around Pittsburgh. By February 1943, his forces are approaching Lubbock, Texas, and - still unknown to him, but highly alarming for Pinkard and the Freedom Party High Command - threatening to capture Camp Determination and expose its litany of horrors. Both sides are working desperately to develop a nuclear weapon, although the US is slightly in the lead. Featherston's increasingly irrational conduct of the war raises suspicions and leads Generals Clarence Potter and Nathan Bedford Forrest III to consider a plot to overthrow him.

== Reception ==
Publishers Weekly gave the book a moderately good review, stating that "As in the previous volume, Turtledove comes up with convincing analogues to events during WWII, such as the Confederate army's Stalingrad-like defeat around Pittsburgh. On the other hand, his portrait of the führer-like Featherstone is less persuasive". SF Site also gave the book praise mixed with some criticism, saying that "Unfortunately, Drive to the East is very much a middle book in a series" but also that the book was "a worthy sequel".
