= Settling Accounts: In at the Death =

Book by Harry Turtledove

- First edition (US)
- Author: Harry Turtledove
- Cover artist: Big dot Design
- Language: English
- Series: Settling Accounts
- Genre: Alternate history
- Publisher: Del Rey Books
- Publication date: July 27, 2007
- Publication place: United States
- Pages: 609 pp (hardcover)
- ISBN: 0-345-49247-1
- OCLC: 85766664
- Dewey Decimal: 813/.54 22
- LC Class: PS3570.U76 S477 2007
- Preceded by: Settling Accounts: The Grapple

Settling Accounts: In at the Death is the last novel of the Settling Accounts tetralogy that presents an alternate history of World War II known as the Second Great War that was released July 27, 2007. It brings to a conclusion the multi-series compilation by author Harry Turtledove, a series sometimes referred to as Southern Victory. It covers the time period from 1943 to 1945.

== Plot introduction ==
This alternative history began with the Confederate States of America winning the American Civil War, here called the War of Secession, in 1862, followed by the Second Mexican War between the United States and Confederate States of America in the 1880s which is also won by the South. Thirty-five years later the North, allied with the Central Powers, wins an alternative World War I, known as the Great War, over the South and its allies, the Triple Entente. As in our actual timeline, another World War follows two decades later, and the North and its primary ally, Germany, win the Second Great War against the Confederates and their allies, including primarily the United Kingdom and France.

== Plot ==
The United States' campaigns mirror Sherman's march to the sea as U.S. armies drive through the center of the Confederacy, while a second U.S. force drives into Virginia to capture Richmond. The horrific nature of war taints the main characters of the series, formerly wholly sympathetic, as virtually all of the beloved heroes of previous books resort to brutal war crime tactics nearly as horrifying as the other side's, but get away without punishment simply because their side is winning. The Confederacy (with some quiet help from the United Kingdom) manages to produce a fission bomb. The bomb is smuggled via truck into the de facto U.S. capital of Philadelphia, and detonated; however, the bomb explodes only on the city's outskirts west of the Schuylkill River. While causing horrific casualties, the bombing does not damage any government buildings. In retaliation, the United States drops two nuclear bombs on Newport News, Virginia, and Charleston, South Carolina. The Newport News bomb narrowly misses Confederate President Jake Featherston.

Texas declares independence from the Confederacy and signs a separate peace with the United States. Jake Featherston attempts to escape to the Deep South but his Douglas C-47 Skytrain is shot down. While Featherston survives the crash landing, he gets sighted and killed by a black guerrilla fighter named Cassius. The fourth and presumably final war between the United States and Confederate States ends officially on July 14, 1944, at 6:01 pm after an unconditional surrender is signed between General Irving Morrell and the new (and outgoing) Confederate President Don Partridge.

The United States commences a full occupation of the former Confederate States and Canada, though Texas apparently remains independent but still hosts American soldiers in its territory. For the first time in 83 years, the Stars and Stripes flies over the whole of the pre-1861 United States territory, and Americans express their determination never to let go of the former Confederate territories, after Featherston came so close to crushing them.

Meanwhile, American forces, to their horror, discover concentration camps for blacks, built by the Confederacy as part of their extermination campaign against their black population, known in the story as "population reductions." The United States government subsequently initiates crimes against humanity trials. Among those found guilty and hanged for participating in or inciting the black Holocaust are Confederate Attorney-General Ferdinand Koenig, Freedom Party chief propagandist Saul Goldman, Camp Determination commandant Jefferson Pinkard, and his aide Vern Green.

The Confederates are bitter and far from being reconciled to their fate; they constantly attack the occupying US forces, despite grim retaliations including the execution of civilian hostages. Though outlawed, the Freedom Party is still very much an active underground force.

Moreover, despite dissolving the Confederate government and declaring its firm intention never to let it rise again, the United States refrains from formally annexing and (re)admitting Southern states back into the Union (with the exception of Kentucky, Tennessee, and Houston, which once again split from Texas), since any free elections would likely fill Congress with the United States' most staunch enemies. Rather, the former Confederate territories are left in the same legal limbo in which Canada has been since 1917 (being offered neither independence nor civil liberties) and kept under an open-ended, harsh military rule.

Despite the enormous victory won by the US, the war has not truly ended, but rather changed its form. To their chagrin, most of the soldiers and sailors conscripted "for the duration" are not discharged but set to occupation duty. The US is faced with the daunting task of keeping under indefinite harsh military occupation a vast satellite bloc with hostile populations, with the conquered Confederate Nations being added to the previously held Canadian ones, as well as the smaller Mormon Utah.

And at the same time, the Nuclear Age has been launched with the destruction of three cities in North America and six in Europe. The first city that Germany uses a superbomb on is Petrograd, which results in most of the city getting destroyed and Russia suing for peace. After the bombing, the Russian capital relocates to Moscow. The second city Germany uses a superbomb on is Paris, which results in most of the city getting destroyed and King Charles XI getting killed in the blast. The new King of France Louis XIX takes the throne and sues for peace. The United Kingdom uses its first superbomb to destroy Hamburg. In response, Germany destroys London, Brighton, and Norwich with three superbombs. Prime Minister Winston Churchill, Oswald Mosley, and King Edward VIII are able to evacuate London before the bombing, knowing the Germans would strike back. After the three British cities are bombed, Britain builds a second superbomb. However, before the nuclear bomb can strike a major German city, it is shot down in German-occupied Belgium, where it explodes harmlessly somewhere between Bruges and Ghent. This results in Winston Churchill being ousted as Prime Minister in a no-confidence vote. Churchill's succeeded by Horace Wilson, who seeks a cease-fire with Germany. Oswald Mosley is also ousted as Chancellor of the Exchequer in a non-confidence vote.

The United States and Germany are determined in trying to prevent Russia and Japan from going nuclear, but these efforts are apparently doomed to failure; moreover, these erstwhile allies themselves seem likely to drift into a Cold War, glaring at each other across the Atlantic. Moreover, aside from the nuclear issue, Japan is presenting an unresolved problem to the US, as Japan has won the Battle of Midway, consolidated its hold on the Western Pacific and Eastern Asia and established a concrete threat to Australia. Having to deal with the Confederacy - either as a belligerent neighbor or as a rebellious occupied block of nations - the US can spare only limited resources for confronting Japan, and the idea of "an island-hopping campaign" across the Pacific is rejected out of hand by one character.

Meanwhile, Democratic candidate Thomas E. Dewey and his running mate Harry S. Truman defeat Socialist President Charles W. La Follette and his running mate Jim Curley in the 1944 United States presidential election. Harold Stassen comes in third place, running as a Republican, carrying electoral votes from the four states of Indiana, Kansas, Minnesota, and Wisconsin. However, because it expected a Socialist victory rather than a Democratic one, the Chicago Tribune had written out headlines the night of the election proclaiming "La Follette beats Dewey".

At his inauguration on February 1, 1945, President Thomas Dewey pledges to continue the occupation of the former Confederate States with the intent to integrate the southern states back into the Union. He also pledges to continue La Follette's policy of racial equality in the armed services. Addressing the international stage, Dewey proposes a continued partnership with America's ally, the German Empire. The "Dewey Doctrine" would allow the United States and Germany to police the world and prevent the proliferation of superbomb technology to former enemies France, Japan, and Russia.

== Reception ==
Stranger Horizons compared the book positively to the preceding one in the series, saying that it was "more engaging than the comparative disappointment of The Grapple, which now appears to have been written because Turtledove had a bit too much for even three packed books, and not quite enough for four really satisfying ones". Publishers Weekly also gave a positive review, saying that the book was a "satisfying if predictable conclusion" to the series. SF Site's review was also positive, saying that "In at the Death forms an excellent coda to this massive series of eleven novels".
