= Settling Accounts: Return Engagement =

2004 book by Harry Turtledove

- First edition (US)
- Author: Harry Turtledove
- Cover artist: Big Dot Design
- Language: English
- Series: Settling Accounts series
- Genre: Alternate History
- Publisher: Del Rey Books
- Publication date: August 2004
- Publication place: United States
- Media type: Print (Paperback & Hardback)
- ISBN: 0-345-45723-4
- OCLC: 56762349
- LC Class: PS3570.U76 S48 2004
- Preceded by: American Empire: The Victorious Opposition
- Followed by: Settling Accounts: Drive to the East

Settling Accounts: Return Engagement is the first book of Harry Turtledove's Settling Accounts series of alternate history novels.

An analog of World War II known as the Second Great War is being waged on American soil between the United States and the Confederate States. This series is part of a larger series of novels. For convenience's sake, many Turtledove fans refer to this as the Southern Victory series. It takes the Southern Victory Series Earth from 1941 to 1942.

== Plot summary ==
Following the plebiscites for the United States to return the occupied states of Kentucky and Houston to the Confederacy in early 1941, Confederate President Jake Featherston breaks his solemn vow and re-militarizes them, essentially declaring war against the United States in act if not in word. US President Al Smith hurries to prepare for war, but his country is sent reeling by Operation Blackbeard, the Confederate attack into Ohio at 3:30 am on June 22, 1941. Soon afterward, British Prime Minister Winston Churchill and the rest of the Entente powers announce hostilities against the U.S.

The U.S. under General Abner Dowling and Colonel Irving Morrell fight desperately, but the 1930s-era unwillingness of the U.S. to adequately meet the danger posed by Featherston's remilitarization of the C.S. tells, in the form of armed forces which are woefully unprepared to meet the intense Confederate combined arms attack. By 1942 the Confederate army has reached the shores of Lake Erie and cut the U.S. in two. Meanwhile, the Mormons in Utah are once again rebelling, prompting a swift response from the U.S. Army, but compounding the difficulties for the U.S. just as in the last war. A U.S. counterattack in Virginia bogs down, and the Confederates are preparing a second offensive for the summer of 1942 when Al Smith is killed in a bombing raid on the capital city of Philadelphia when the bunker underneath the Powel House is destroyed and the building itself is severely damaged. A shaken Charles W. La Follette is sworn in as President of a nation fighting for its survival.

Meanwhile, in the Confederacy, the murderous persecution of blacks is escalating towards a full-scale genocide. Another hint of things to come is provided when Featherston makes a strategic blunder in rejecting the offer of a physics professor to start research towards producing nuclear weapons, believing that the professor just wants government money to finance an abstruse scientific project – while it is hinted that the U.S. has started a version of the Manhattan Project, located in the state of Washington and overseen by Assistant Secretary of War Franklin D. Roosevelt, who in this world harbors no presidential ambitions.

== Reception ==
Publishers Weekly praised the book in their review, saying that "The insights into racial politics elevate this novel to a status above mere entertainment". SF Site's review was more mixed, saying that the book has "too many major characters, and no wow factor".
