= The Coming of the Quantum Cats =

1986 novel by Frederik Pohl

- Cover of the first edition.
- Author: Frederik Pohl
- Cover artist: Todd Schorr
- Language: English
- Genre: Science fiction
- Published: 1986 (Bantam Books)
- Publication place: United States
- Media type: Print (Hardcover & Paperback)
- Pages: 243
- ISBN: 0-553-05129-6
- OCLC: 232354143

The Coming of the Quantum Cats is a 1986 science fiction novel by American writer Frederik Pohl. It was originally serialized in Analog science-fiction magazine, January–April 1986.

== Plot introduction ==
The novel proposes invasions from alternate Earths in alternate universes. None of these universes are quite like our universe; however, they all have some element or other in common, many of which Pohl develops to satiric effect.

- In one universe, Nancy Reagan is the President of the United States and her mostly disregarded husband Ronald is known as "The First Gentleman". John F. Kennedy is a Senator from Massachusetts who is married to a woman called Marilyn.
- In another universe, America's political spectrum has shifted far to the right; Ronald Reagan remained true to his early left-wing politics and is still married to his first wife Jane Wyman.
- In the past of some of the worlds, the young revolutionary Joseph Dzhugashvili (not known in these worlds as Joseph Stalin) had escaped from Russia to America in the 1900s, taking with him the proceeds of a robbery (the 1907 Tiflis bank robbery) conducted on behalf of the Bolsheviks and using the money to set himself up as a big American capitalist.

The book presents multiple versions of three characters—Dominic DeSota, Nyla Christophe, and Larry Douglas—and their interactions as different versions of the characters travel from one Earth to another. Dominic DeSota is the main character, with most of the book told from the divergent viewpoints of three of his avatars (see following), with brief glimpses of numerous additional Dominic DeSotas scattered throughout the novel as varying between a nuclear scientist and a hunter scrabbling for bare existence in the ruins left after a nuclear holocaust.

The book seems to argue in favor of the idea that social conditions rather than heredity shape a person's character and behavior (the nature versus nurture debate). As depicted again and again in the course of the book, people born with precisely the same genetic heritage can - given different social conditions - develop completely different character traits (timid or assertive, benevolent or predatory, etc.)

=== Origin of the title ===
The title refers to the famous thought-experiment known as "Schrödinger's Cat", where the outcome of a real-world event depends on a quantum event. By some interpretations, the real-world object, in this case a cat, must be in two states simultaneously until it is observed. However, the story is more closely related to the many-worlds interpretation of quantum mechanics where all possible outcomes of an event occur, each in its own parallel universe. The same concept was treated, somewhat more pessimistically, in Larry Niven's short story "All the Myriad Ways".

== Plot summary ==
The novel begins with Nicky DeSota as a timid mortgage broker in a fascist America, who draws the unwelcome attention of Nyla Christophe, an agent of the FBI (a brutal, full-fledged secret police in his world), who is investigating a break-in at a government lab by someone who proves to be a Dominic DeSota from an alternate universe. Used as a pawn by Christophe's con-man boyfriend Larry Douglas to entrap a left-wing activist and former actor (who turns out to be Ronald Reagan), he is later detained and brought to New Mexico to unravel a mystery.

The focus then shifts to another Dominic DeSota, a United States Senator having an affair with Nyla Christophe Bowquist, who in this world is a famous violinist. Contacted by the military, he travels to Sandia National Laboratories, where he meets an identical version of himself—a "Cat" from an alternate universe. As Senator DeSota interviews his alternate-universe counterpart, the man vanishes after offering a cryptic warning. As the senator leaves the building, the base commander and he are captured by a detachment of troops led by Major Dominic P. DeSota, the commander of a military force from yet another universe.

Major DeSota's mission is revealed to be to secure the parallel-world research facilities of Senator DeSota's universe, which is the first step in a larger military operation. In Major DeSota's universe (which is subsequently designated Paratime Gamma), a militaristic United States is engaged in a tense standoff with the Soviet Union, and wants to use Senator DeSota's universe (Paratime Epsilon) to launch sneak attacks against them. After being transported to Paratime Gamma, Senator DeSota manages to escape by distracting his guard, Sgt. Nyla Sambok (Gamma's version of Nyla Christophe) and escaping through a portal with a scientist to Paratime Tau—the home universe of Nicky DeSota.

After being discovered in the desert, Senator DeSota and the scientist—who is Larry Douglas from another universe—are captured and interrogated by Agent Christophe. In an interrogation session involving the senator, the scientist, and their counterparts from Paratime Tau, Douglas reveals that he is from Paratime Alpha, and that he was forced by the military in Paratime Gamma to give them the ability to travel between universes. As Agent Christophe begins to pressure Douglas to give her government similar assistance, the other FBI agent with her and she are rendered unconscious by knockout darts fired by Dominic DeSota—the same one who had escaped interrogation in Sandia.

DeSota brings the entire group back to his universe—Paratime Alpha—where he explains that since the senator's escape that Paratime Gamma has invaded the Epsilon's Washington DC in a failed bid to capture the president. He also reveals that travel between universes is creating a growing problem of "ballistic recoil", where the boundaries between the universes are growing weaker, causing matter and energy to cross unintentionally from one universe to the next (something depicted in interludes between the chapters). He brings the travelers to Washington DC, where they cross over to Paratime Epsilon in an effort to help stop the invasion.

Before they can help, however, every "Cat" located in a different universe disappears, along with any scientists involved in paratime research. There, they are informed that they have been transported by a group of more advanced alternate Earths to stop ballistic recoil before it escalates and the barriers between universes become irreparably permeable. The "Cats" are relocated to New York City on a new Earth, one being resettled after its inhabitants wiped themselves out. There, the paratime transplants gradually settle into new lives.

Six months after his arrival, Nicky DeSota returns to New York to propose to Agent Christophe. Now working on a collective farm in Palm Springs, he has embraced the opportunity for a new life and developed into a much more confident man. After considering his proposal, the Nyla of his world accepts. On their trip back to California, however, Nicky reveals to her his expectation that their transplantation has not solved the problem of paratime travel—that with an infinite number of Earths, the number of them that will develop the ability to cross into alternate worlds will only increase, so many that the problem of ballistic recoil may prove to be unavoidable.

== Characters ==
- Nicky DeSota, Senator DeSota, Major Dominic P. DeSota, Dominic DeSota-Arbenz - versions of Dominic DeSota, being respectively a mortgage broker, a US Senator, an Army officer and a traveller among the parallel worlds: The last of these belongs to an enlightened society where it is customary for a husband to add his wife's family name after his own.
- Nyla Christophe (three versions) who are Nicky DeSota's FBI tormentor, world-famous violinist who is Dominic DeSota's mistress, and Major DeSota's aide (who is in love with her boss)
- Larry Douglas a.k.a. Lavrenti Dzhugashvili, (three versions), boyfriend of a Nyla, a friend of Senator DeSota (as Lavrenti), and a captive scientist: All are grandsons of alternate versions of Iosif Vissarionovich Dzhugashvili, known in our universe as Joseph Stalin - who in these timelines escaped to America with the proceeds of the Tbilisi bank robbery, using the proceeds to set himself up a big American capitalist.

== Reception ==
Dave Langford reviewed The Coming of the Quantum Cats for White Dwarf #89, and stated that "Pohl, a reliably thoughtful author, goes one better than his semi-happy finale. As with nuclear weapons, the crosstime technology can't be uninvented, while there's an infinity of potential new inventors..."

== Reviews ==
- Review by Dan Chow (1986) in Locus, #303 April 1986
- Review by Anthony Low (1986) in Fantasy Review, April 1986
- Review by Don D'Ammassa (1986) in Science Fiction Chronicle, #82 July 1986
- Review by Everett F. Bleiler [as by E. F. Bleiler] (1986) in Rod Serling's The Twilight Zone Magazine, October 1986
- Review by Eugene Lin (1986) in Thrust, #25, Winter 1986
- Review by Ken Lake (1987) in Vector 138
- Review by David V. Barrett (1987) in Vector 138
- Review by Lee Montgomerie (1987) in Interzone, #21 Autumn 1987
- Review [French] by Jonathan Dornet (1988) in A&A, #113-114
- Review by Chris Bailey [as by Chris C. Bailey] (1989) in Paperback Inferno, #80
