= Paul M. Lally =

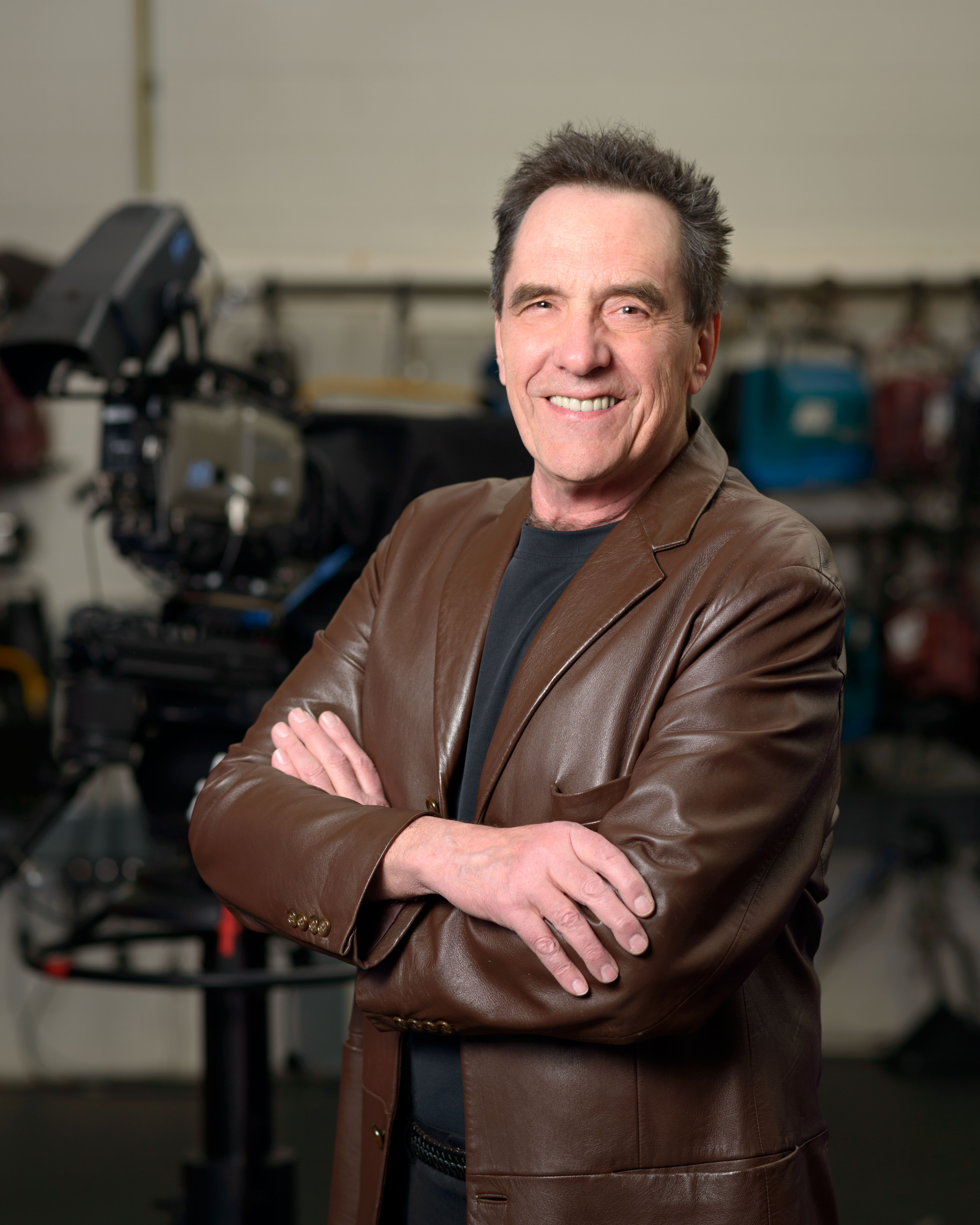
- Lally in 2016

Paul M. Lally is a North American television producer, writer, and director.

== Career ==
Lally directed over 100 episodes of Mister Rogers’ Neighborhood

His PBS screenwriting credits include Alias Jimmy Valentine, an O. Henry adapted screenplay for American Playhouse, and episodic writing for Mister Rogers’ Neighborhood. His commercial screenplay credits include Little Red Riding Hood and Hansel and Gretel for Walt Disney Productions.

He was host and narrator of four public television storytelling series; Gather 'Round, Teletales, Gentle Giant" and A Fairy Tale Comforter for Children.

His PBS executive producing credits include Ciao Italia with Mary Ann Esposito, an Italian how-to cooking series broadcast nationwide on PBS stations.

He wrote and directed Golden: The Hobey Baker Story

He narrated American music composer Ward Dilmore's The Nightingale and The Snow Queen, as performed by the ballet troupe Petit Papillon, under the direction of Patricia Walker.

His fourteen novels include the alternate military history trilogies RISE AGAIN and AMERIKA, and the novels, RIDE THE TITANIC, BAR HARBOR GOLD, SILK, BATTLESHIP BOYS, and the FLYBOY trilogy.
