= Karen Olsson (disambiguation) =

Karen Olsson is a writer.

Karen Ols(s)on may also refer to:

- Karen Olsson (politician)
- Karen Olson, charity worker
- Karen Olson (The Faculty), fictional character

== See also ==
- Karen Olsen (disambiguation)
- Karin Olsson (disambiguation)
