= Moody Theater =

Theater and studio for Austin City Limits

- ACL Live
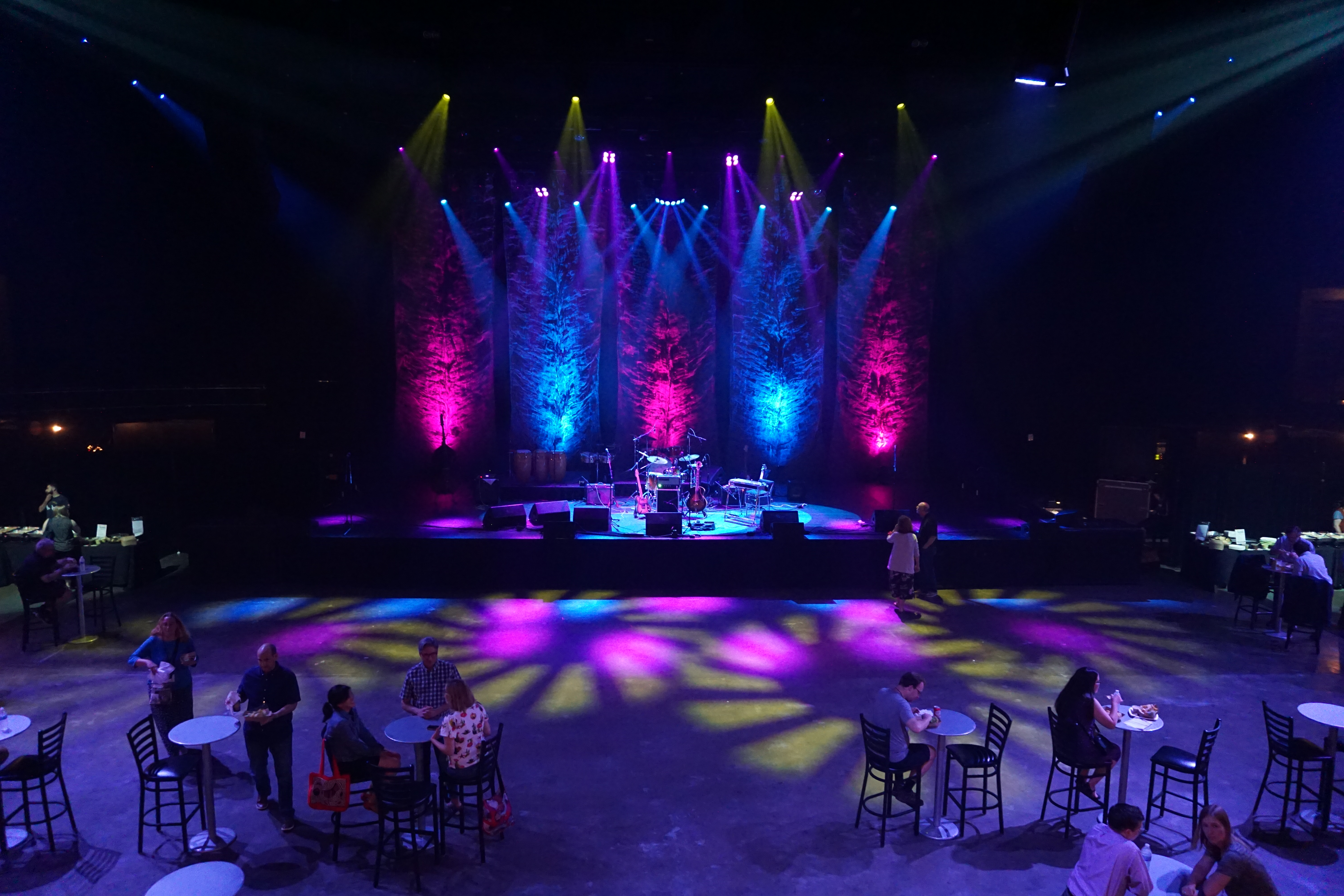
- Interactive map of Moody Theater
- Full name: Austin City Limits Live at The Moody Theater
- Address: 310 W Second St; Austin, TX 78701-4609
- Location: Block 21, Second Street District, Downtown Austin
- Coordinates: 30°15′55″N 97°44′49″W
- Owner: Opry Entertainment Group
- Capacity: 2,750

Construction
- Groundbreaking: October 13, 2007
- Opened: February 10, 2011
- Cost: $40 million
- Architect: Andersson-Wise Architects
- Structural engineer: Thornton Tomassetti
- Services engineers: JJA, Inc.
- General contractor: Austin Building Company

Website
- acl-live.com

Austin City Limits Live at The Moody Theater (ACL Live or Moody Theater) is the theater and studio for Austin City Limits, completed in February 2011 as part of the Block 21 complex.

The Moody Foundation of Galveston granted $2.5 million to KLRU, the largest single gift ever received by the PBS station, to help equip the new home of Austin City Limits on Second Street (Willie Nelson Boulevard) in Downtown Austin, Texas with high-definition production equipment. In recognition, the venue is called Austin City Limits Live at The Moody Theater.

The theater/studio holds 2,750 fans, up from the capacity of 320 at its old space on the University of Texas at Austin campus, and hosts an estimated 100 concerts and 100 private events a year, in addition to the Austin City Limits tapings. KLRU gets 45 days a year, rent-free, to produce each season of program.
