= Bibliography of Richard Nixon =

This bibliography of Richard Nixon includes publications by Richard Nixon, the 37th president of the United States, and books and scholarly articles about him and his policies.

== Primary sources ==
- The Public Papers of the Presidents of the United States, Richard Nixon, 1969-1974, 6 vol. (Washington: U.S. Government Printing Office, 1970-1975).
- Foreign Relations of the United States: Nixon-Ford Administrations

=== By Richard Nixon ===
- The Challenges We Face: Edited and Compiled from the Speeches and Papers of Richard M. Nixon (1960) ISBN 0-7581-8739-4
- Six Crises, Doubleday (1962) ISBN 0-385-00125-8. Written following Nixon's loss to John F. Kennedy in the 1960 United States presidential election, this memoir includes the six major professional crises of Nixon's life to that point, including—in addition to the campaign against Kennedy—the Alger Hiss trial, the Checkers speech, and the Kitchen Debate with Nikita Khrushchev.
- "The Second Office", The World Book Encyclopedia Year Book 1964, Field Enterprises Educational Corporation, 1964, ASIN B000K6CGVU.
- “Asia After Viet Nam”. Foreign Affairs, Vol. 46, No. 1, October 1967. Published by the Council on Foreign Relations.
- RN: The Memoirs of Richard Nixon. Simon & Schuster (Reprint, 1978) ISBN 0-671-70741-8
- The Real War. Sidgwick Jackson (1980) ISBN 0-283-98650-6. Written as a cri de coeur against what Nixon saw as serious threats to U.S. security from Soviet expansionism in the late 1970s.
- Leaders. Random House (1982) ISBN 0-446-51249-4. A character study of various leaders that Nixon came to know during his career.
- Real Peace. Sidgwick & Jackson Ltd (1984) ISBN 0-283-99076-7

External videos
- Part One of Booknotes interview with Nixon on Seize the Moment, February 23, 1992
- Part Two of Booknotes interview, March 1, 1992

- “Reagan and Gorbachev: Superpower Summitry”. Foreign Affairs, Vol. 64, No. 1, Fall 1985. Published by the Council on Foreign Relations.
- No More Vietnams Arbor House Publishing (1987) ISBN 0-87795-668-5
- 1999: Victory Without War Simon & Schuster (1988) ISBN 0-671-62712-0
- “American Foreign Policy: The Bush Agenda”. Foreign Affairs, Vol. 68, No. 1, America and the World 1988. Published by the Council on Foreign Relations.
- In the Arena: A Memoir of Victory, Defeat, and Renewal. Simon & Schuster (1990) ISBN 0-671-72318-9. A more personal memoir than RN: The Memoirs of Richard Nixon, shows Nixon's reflections on life, politics and personal philosophy.
- Seize the Moment: America's Challenge in a One-Superpower World. Simon & Schuster (1992) ISBN 0-671-74343-0
- Beyond Peace. Random House (1994) ISBN 0-679-43323-6. Completed two weeks before his death and published posthumously.

=== By other authors ===
- Burns, Arthur F. (2010). Ferrell, Robert H. (ed.). Inside the Nixon Administration: The Secret Diary of Arthur Burns, 1969-1974. University Press of Kansas. ISBN 9780700617302. LCCN 2010021333.
- Dean, John. Blind Ambition (1976).
- Drury, Allen. Courage and Hesitation: Notes and Photographs of the Nixon Administration (1971).
- Ehrlichman, John D. Witness to Power: The Nixon Years (1982).
- Gergen, David. Eyewitness to Power: The Essence of Leadership (2000).
- Haldeman, H. R. ('Bob') The Haldeman Diaries: Inside the Nixon White House (1994), abridged version; complete diaries were published on CD-ROM by Sony.
- Kissinger, Henry. White House Years (1979).
- Kissinger, Henry. Years of Upheaval (1982).
- Nixon, Edward & Karen Olson. The Nixons: A Family Portrait (2009). ISBN 978-1-935359-05-0.
- Price, Raymond. With Nixon (1977).
- Safire, William. Before the Fall: An Inside View of the Pre-Watergate White House (1975).
- Stans, Maurice H. One of the President's Men: Twenty Years with Eisenhower and Nixon (1995).

== Secondary sources ==
- Hall, Mitchell K. ed. Historical Dictionary of the Nixon-Ford Era (2008) 285pp
- Small, Melvin (2011). Small, Melvin (ed.). A Companion to Richard M. Nixon. Malden, MA: Wiley Blackwell. Archived from the original on June 17, 2015 – via Questia.

=== Biographies ===
- Aitken, Jonathan. Nixon: A Life (1993).
- Ambrose, Stephen E. Nixon: The Education of a Politician 1913–1962 (1987).
  - Ambrose, Stephen E. Nixon: The Triumph of a Politician, 1962–1972 (1989).
  - Ambrose, Stephen E. Nixon: Ruin and Recovery 1973–1990 (1991).
- Black, Conrad. Richard M. Nixon: A Life in Full (2007).
- Crowley, Monica. Nixon in Winter: His Final Revelations About Diplomacy, Watergate, and Life Out of the Arena (1998).
- Endicott, Michael A. After Watergate: The Renaissance of Richard Nixon (2018).
- Farrell, John A. Richard Nixon: The Life (2017).
- Greenberg, David. Nixon's Shadow: The History of an Image (2003). Important study of how Nixon was perceived by media and scholars.
- Hoff, Joan. Nixon Reconsidered (1994).
- Morgan, Iwan. On Nixon (2002).
- Morris, Roger. Richard Milhous Nixon: The Rise of an American Politician (1990) (ISBN 978-0805018349).

External videos
- Booknotes interview with Tom Wicker on One of Us: Richard Nixon and the American Dream, April 7, 1991, C-SPAN

- Parmet, Herbert S. Richard Nixon and His America (1990).
- Pipes, Kasey S. After the Fall: The Remarkable Comeback of Richard Nixon (2019).
- Reeves, Richard. President Nixon: Alone in the White House (2002).
- Schoenebaum, Eleanora. Political Profiles: The Nixon/Ford years (1979) online, short biographies of over 500 political and national leaders.
- Thomas, Evan. Being Nixon: A Man Divided (2016)
- Wicker, Tom. One of Us: Richard Nixon and the American Dream (1991).

=== Political studies ===
- Bochin, Hal W. Richard Nixon: Rhetorical Strategist (1990)
- Congressional Quarterly, Inc. CQ Almanac (Annual, 1947-1975), 900+ pages each; highly detailed reports on national politics.
  - Congress and the Nation: vol. III 1969-1972 Summarizes the annual almanacs; DOI: https://doi.org/10.4135/9781483302669
  - Congress and the Nation, 1973-1976, Vol. IV DOI: https://doi.org/10.4135/9781483302676
- Dallek, Robert (2007). Nixon and Kissinger: Partners in Power. Harper Collins. ISBN 978-0-06-072230-2.
- Dobbs, Michael. King Richard: Nixon and Watergate: An American Tragedy (2021)
- Evans, Rowland and Robert D. Novak. Nixon in the White House: The Frustration of Power (1971).
- Friedman, Leon and William F. Levantrosser, eds. Richard M. Nixon: Politician, President, Administrator (1991), essays by scholars.
- Friedman, Leon and William F. Levantrosser, eds. Watergate and Afterward: The Legacy of Richard M. Nixon (1992), essays by scholars.
- Genovese, Michael A. The Nixon Presidency: Power and Politics in Turbulent Times (1990).
- Greene, John Robert. The Limits of Power: The Nixon and Ford Administrations (1992).
- Gellman, Irwin. The Contender: Richard Nixon: The Congress Years, 1946 to 1952 (1999)
- Gellman, Irwin. The President and the Apprentice: Eisenhower and Nixon, 1952-1961 (2015)
- Kraus, Sidney (1977). The Great Debates: Kennedy vs. Nixon, 1960. Bloomington, IN: Indiana University Press. Archived from the original on May 31, 2014 – via Questia.
- Mason, Robert (2004). Richard Nixon and the Quest for a New Majority. Chapel Hill, NC: University of North Carolina Press. Archived from the original on April 7, 2019 – via Questia.
- Matusow, Allen J. Nixon's Economy: Booms, Busts, Dollars and Votes. U. Press of Kansas, 1998. 323 pp.
- Marvillas, Anthony Rama. "Nixon in Nixonland." Southern California Quarterly, 2002, 84(2): 169–181. ISSN 0038-3929.
- Perlstein, Rick. Nixonland: The Rise of a President and the Fracturing of America (2008) 881 pp.
- Reichley, A. James (1981). Conservatives in an Age of Change: The Nixon and Ford Administrations. Washington, DC: Brookings Institution. Archived from the original on April 7, 2019 – via Questia.
- Schudson, Michael. Watergate in American Memory: How We Remember, Forget, and Reconstruct the Past (1993)/
- Small, Melvin. The Presidency of Richard Nixon (2003).
- Thomas, G. Scott (2011). A New World to Be Won: John Kennedy, Richard Nixon, and the Tumultuous Year of 1960. Santa Barbara, CA: Praeger. Archived from the original on April 7, 2019 – via Questia.
- Summers, Anthony. The Arrogance of Power The Secret World of Richard Nixon (2000)
- Weiner, Tim. One Man Against the World: The Tragedy of Richard Nixon (2015)
- White, Theodore. The Making of the President 1960 (1961), narrative history
  - White, Theodore. The Making of the President, 1968 (1969)
  - White, Theodore. The Making of the President, 1972 (1973)
- Wills, Garry. Nixon Agonistes: The Crisis of the Self-Made Man (1969)
- Woodward, Bob and Carl Bernstein. All The President's Men (1974)
- Woodward, Bob and Carl Bernstein. The Final Days (1976)

=== Foreign policy ===
- Andrew, Christopher. For the President’s Eyes Only: Secret Intelligence and the American Presidency from Washington to Bush (1995), pp 350–96.
- Bundy, William. A Tangled Web: The Making of Foreign Policy in the Nixon Presidency. 1998. 647 pp. online review
- Daum, Andreas W.; Gardner, Lloyd C.; Mausbach, Wilfred, eds. America, the Vietnam War, and the World: Comparative and International Perspectives (Publications of the German Historical Institute) (2003)
- Gaddis, John Lewis Strategies of Containment: A Critical Appraisal of Postwar American National Security Policy 1982.
- Goh, Evelyn. "Nixon, Kissinger, and the 'Soviet Card' in the U.S. Opening to China, 1971–1974." Diplomatic History 2005 29(3): 475-502. ISSN 0145-2096 Fulltext in Ingenta and Ebsco; Kissinger's use of the "Soviet card" in relations with China between 1971 and 1974 offers diplomatic historians an interesting, if not yet conclusive, perspective on the rise and fall of détente and the problems of "triangular diplomacy." Kissinger sought to play up the Soviet threat to the Chinese as a way of promoting closer relations with the PRC. While at times he suggested a U.S.-PRC alliance, declassified sources indicate that his suggestions were more hyperbole than actual U.S. policy. He was really using the Soviet threat as a means to a closer relationship with China, but one that was still subordinated to improved U.S.–Soviet relations. Unfortunately for Kissinger and the Nixon administration, the triangular diplomacy failed because of Chinese suspicions and the Watergate crisis.
- Herschensohn, Bruce. An American Amnesia: How the U.S. Congress Forced the Surrenders of South Vietnam and Cambodia (2010)
- Kimball, Jeffrey P. Nixon's Vietnam War (2002)
- Levantrosser, William F. ed. Cold War Patriot and Statesman, Richard M. Nixon (1993), essays by scholars and senior officials.
- Preston, Andrew; Logevall, Fredrik (2008). Preston, Andrew; Logevall, Fredrik (eds.). Nixon in the World: American Foreign Relations, 1969-1977. New York: Oxford University Press. Archived from the original on January 25, 2019 – via Questia.
- Shawcross, William. Sideshow: Kissinger, Nixon, and the Destruction of Cambodia (1979), Simon and Schuster. Strong critique of Cambodia policy. Kissinger responds directly to Shawcross' claims in appendix to Years of Upheaval.
- Thornton, Richard C. The Nixon-Kissinger Years: Reshaping America's Foreign Policy (1989)
- Tucker, Nancy Bernkopf. "Taiwan Expendable? Nixon and Kissinger Go to China" Journal of American History 2005 92(1): 109–135. ISSN 0021-8723 Fulltext in History Cooperative and Ebsco. Analyzes U.S. policy toward China and finds that Nixon and Kissinger pursued a deeply flawed and ultimately harmful path toward establishing relations with Communist China. Nixon and Kissinger operated in secrecy in order to hide the "collateral damage" of their China policy, particularly the damage it did to the former U.S. client state of Taiwan.
- Warner, Geoffrey, “Nixon, Kissinger, and the Breakup of Pakistan, 1971,” International Affairs (London), 81 (Oct. 2005), 1097–1118.

=== Domestic policy and matters ===
- Brinkley, Douglas. Silent Spring Revolution: John F. Kennedy, Rachel Carson, Lyndon Johnson, Richard Nixon, and the Great Environmental Awakening (2022) excerpt
- Bryce, Emma. "America’s Greenest Presidents' New York Times Sept 20, 2012; a poll of scholars ranks Theodore Roosevelt as #1 followed by Nixon, Carter, Obama, Jefferson, Ford, FDR, and Clinton online
- Burke, Vincent J. Nixon's Good Deed: Welfare Reform (1974)
- Flippen, J. Brooks. Nixon and the Environment (2000).
- Hood, J. Larry. "The Nixon Administration and the Revised Philadelphia Plan for Affirmative Action: A Study in Expanding Presidential Power and Divided Government" Presidential Studies Quarterly 23 (Winter 1993): 145–67
- Kotlowski, Dean J. Nixon's Civil Rights: Politics, Principle, and Policy (2001).
- Kotlowski, Dean J.; "Richard Nixon and the Origins of Affirmative Action" The Historian. Volume: 60. Issue: 3. 1998. pp. 523 ff.
- Kotlowski, Dean J. "Deeds Versus Words: Richard Nixon and Civil Rights Policy." New England Journal of History 1999–2000 56(2–3): 122–144. Abstract: Political considerations and his own personal views gave President Nixon a mixed record in the area of civil rights, which included such advances as the implementation of affirmative action, school desegregation, and other types of economic support promoting racial equality, but opposed busing, ignored women, and made compromises to placate Southern conservatives.
- Kutler, Stanley I. The Wars of Watergate: The Last Crisis of Richard Nixon. (1990).
- McAndrews, Lawrence J.; "The Politics of Principle: Richard Nixon and School Desegregation" The Journal of Negro History, Vol. 83 #3, 1998 pp 187+
- Olson, Keith W. Watergate: The Presidential Scandal That Shook America. (2003). 220 pp.
- O'Reilly, Kenneth Nixon's Piano: Presidents and Racial Politics from Washington to Clinton (1995)
- Matusow, Allen J. Nixon's Economy: Booms, Busts, Dollars, and Votes (1998)
- Schell, Jonathan "The Time of Illusion" Vintage (1976)
- Soden, Dennis, ed. The Environmental Presidency (SUNY, 1999) online
- Sussman, Glen, and Byron W. Daynes. "Spanning the century: Theodore Roosevelt, Franklin Roosevelt, Richard Nixon, Bill Clinton, and the environment." White House Studies 4.3 (2004): 337-355. online
- Train, Russell E. "The environmental record of the Nixon administration." Presidential Studies Quarterly 26.1 (1996): 185-196. online

=== Cultural studies ===
- Feeney, Mark. Nixon at the Movies: A Book About Belief. Chicago: University of Chicago, 2004.
- Frick, Daniel. Reinventing Richard Nixon: A Cultural History of An American Obsession, 2008.
