= Texas Monthly Talks =

American interview television show

Texas Monthly Talks was a thirty-minute interview show on public television networks across the state of Texas hosted by Evan Smith, then Editor Emeritus of Texas Monthly magazine. Produced by Dateline NBC veteran Lynn Boswell, the show addressed contemporary issues in Texas politics, business and culture. Premiering in February 2003, the show was an original production of KLRU-TV, the PBS station serving Austin and Central Texas. In 2010, the series was succeeded by Overheard, with the same format, host and producer; the renaming was necessary because Smith had resigned his position at the magazine and had become Editor in Chief of the Texas Tribune.

On Texas Monthly Talks Smith regularly interviewed public figures from Austin and around Texas, such as Bill Powers, the president of the University of Texas at Austin, mayors Bill White of Houston, Tom Leppert of Dallas, and Texas Governor Rick Perry. His guests also included notables in national politics, such as presidential candidates Howard Dean, John Kerry, Bill Bradley, John McCain, Joe Biden, Mike Huckabee, Bill Richardson, Hillary Clinton, and John Edwards; in business, such as Southwest Airlines co-founder Herb Kelleher and Whole Foods Market CEO John Mackey; in the media, such as New York Times columnists Maureen Dowd and Frank Rich and newscasters Jim Lehrer, Walter Cronkite, Dan Rather, Bob Schieffer, and Tom Brokaw; and in entertainment, such as directors Francis Ford Coppola, John Sayles, and David Lynch, singers Ted Nugent and Billy Gibbons, novelist Salman Rushdie, and actresses Lauren Bacall, Lily Tomlin, and Debra Winger.

In 2006, the show won a Lone Star Emmy Award for interview program. In 2009, an episode with Billy Bob Thornton won a Lone Star Emmy Award for arts or entertainment program.

== Guests by season ==
=== Season eight ===
- Mike Leach, head football coach of the Texas Tech University Red Raiders
- E. J. Dionne, columnist and author
- Francisco Cigarroa, Chancellor of the University of Texas System
- Madeleine Albright, former U.S. Secretary of State
- Buzz Aldrin, former astronaut
- Taylor Branch, author
- Gail Collins, New York Times columnist
- Jane Smiley, novelist
- Richard Linklater, director
- Morley Safer, broadcast journalist
- Michael Williams, Texas Railroad Commissioner and Republican candidate for the U.S. Senate
- Augie Garrido, University of Texas baseball coach
- Jon Meacham, editor of Newsweek
- David Brancaccio, host of Now on PBS
- Julian Castro, mayor of San Antonio
- Mark Halperin and John Heilemann, authors
- Tim Matheson, actor
- Thomas Haden Church, actor
- Jake Silverstein, author and editor of Texas Monthly
- Cecile Richards, president of the Planned Parenthood Federation of America
- Frank Deford, sportswriter
- Arianna Huffington, founder of The Huffington Post
- Anna Deavere Smith, actress and playwright
- The Right Rev. Andrew C. Doyle, the Ninth Bishop of the Episcopal Diocese of Texas
- Gwen Ifill, journalist
- Sally Ride, astronaut

=== Season seven ===
- Matthew McConaughey, actor
- Lily Tomlin, comedian
- Rick Noriega, state representative and 2008 Democratic nominee for U.S. Senate
- John Cornyn, U.S. Senator from Texas
- Boone Pickens, energy magnate
- Rick Riordan, author
- Susan Orlean, author
- Roy Blount Jr., author
- Mark McKinnon, Matthew Dowd, and Douglas Brinkley, pundits
- Tom Kite, golfer
- John Sharp, former Texas comptroller and Democratic candidate for the U.S. Senate
- Jerry Patterson, Texas Land Commissioner
- David Dewhurst, Lieutenant Governor of Texas
- Joe Straus, Speaker of the Texas House of Representatives
- Carl Hiaasen, author
- Abraham Verghese, author
- Bryan Burrough, author
- Roy Spence, advertising executive
- John Mendelsohn, president of M.D. Anderson Cancer Center
- Billy Bob Thornton, actor
- Mary Ellen Mark, photographer
- Dee Dee Myers, former White House press secretary
- Douglas Brinkley, author and historian
- Sonny Rollins, musician
- Jody Conradt, college basketball coach
- Jeffrey Toobin, author and CNN commentator

=== Season six ===
- Lance Armstrong, athlete
- Tina Brown, author and editor
- Robert Draper, author
- Mark Halperin, ABC News political analyst
- Clayton Williams, oilman and 1990 Republican gubernatorial candidate
- Bill Richardson, Governor of New Mexico and 2008 Democratic presidential candidate
- Ethan Hawke, actor
- Carly Fiorina, former CEO and chairman of the board of Hewlett-Packard
- Bill White, mayor of Houston
- Carl Bernstein, author
- Mike Huckabee, former governor of Arkansas and 2008 Republican presidential candidate
- Burton Tansky, president and CEO, The Neiman Marcus Group
- Jim Lehrer, broadcast journalist
- Francis Ford Coppola, director
- Silvestre Reyes, U.S. Congressman from El Paso and Chair of the House Select Committee on Intelligence
- Bud Shrake, novelist
- John Sayles, director
- Jeff Daniels, actor
- Bob Dole, former U.S. senator from Kansas and 1996 Republican presidential candidate
- Tom Daschle, former U.S. senator from South Dakota and former Senate Democratic leader
- Hillary Clinton, U.S. Senator from New York and 2008 Democratic presidential candidate
- Tom Leppert, mayor of Dallas
- Elsa Murano, president of Texas A&M University
- Debra Winger, actress
- Billy Gibbons, musician
- Don McLeroy, chairman of the State Board of Education
- Lyle Lovett, musician

=== Season five ===
- Mack Brown, head coach of the University of Texas Longhorns
- James Baker, former secretary of state
- Rick Perry, Governor of Texas
- Chris Bell, Democratic gubernatorial candidate
- Al Franken, radio personality and author
- Carole Keeton Strayhorn, Independent gubernatorial candidate
- Tom Brokaw, broadcast journalist
- Kinky Friedman, Independent gubernatorial candidate
- Gregory Curtis, author and former editor of Texas Monthly
- Judith Ivey, actress
- Dorothy Bush Koch, presidential kin/author
- John Kerry, U.S. Senator from Massachusetts and 2004 Democratic party nominee for president
- Lawrence Wright, author
- Gore Vidal, author
- Margaret Spellings, U.S. Secretary of Education
- Pete Laney, former Speaker of the Texas House of Representatives
- Steven Weinberg, Nobel Prize-winning physicist
- David Lynch, director
- Tom Vilsack, former governor of Iowa and 2008 Democratic presidential candidate
- Ray Suarez, broadcast journalist
- Tom Craddick, Speaker of the Texas House of Representatives
- John Edwards, former U.S. senator from North Carolina and 2008 Democratic presidential candidate
- Calvin Trillin, author
- Betty Buckley, actress
- Ted Nugent, musician
- Bob Schieffer, broadcast journalist
- Bill Bradley, former U.S. senator from New Jersey
- Christopher Hitchens, author
- Michael Beschloss, historian
- Norman Pearlstine, former editor in chief of Time Inc.

=== Season four ===
- Dan Rather, broadcast journalist
- Larry Faulkner, outgoing president of the University of Texas at Austin
- Mark Halperin, head of ABC News Political Unit
- Karen Olsson and Nate Blakeslee, authors/journalists
- Bruce Babbitt, former governor of Arizona and 1988 Democratic presidential candidate
- Wallace Jefferson, Chief Justice of the Texas Supreme Court
- Greg Abbott, Attorney General of Texas
- Maureen Dowd, columnist
- John McCain, U.S. Senator from Arizona
- John Cornyn, U.S. Senator from Texas
- Ralph Neas, head of People for the American Way
- Dick DeGuerin, attorney
- Louis Sachar, novelist
- Bill Powers, incoming president of the University of Texas at Austin
- Ana Marie Cox, blogger
- Frank Rich, columnist
- Doris Kearns Goodwin, historian
- Joe Biden, U.S. Senator from Delaware
- Salman Rushdie, novelist
- Elizabeth Crook, novelist
- Walter Cronkite, broadcast journalist
- Paul Begala, political strategist/broadcast journalist
- Stephen Harrigan, novelist
- Jack S. Blanton, philanthropist
- Jane Fonda, actress
- Kris Kristofferson, singer and actor
- Karenna Gore Schiff, author
- Dave Hickey, critic

=== Season three ===
- Tom Craddick, Speaker of the Texas House of Representatives
- Joel Osteen, preacher
- Liz Carpenter, former presidential press secretary
- Matthew Dowd, political strategist
- Robert MacNeil, broadcast journalist
- Kinky Friedman, 2006 candidate for Texas governor
- John Shelby Spong, former Episcopal Bishop of Newark
- Jack Valenti, former LBJ aide/former head of the Motion Picture Association of America
- Lauren Bacall, actress
- Billy Joe Shaver, singer
- Al Franken, radio personality and author
- Ruth Reichl, editor of Gourmet magazine
- Anita Perry, first lady of Texas
- Liz Smith, gossip columnist
- Ronnie Earle, Travis County District Attorney
- Linda Ellerbee, broadcast journalist
- Isabel Allende, novelist
- Joaquin Jackson, former Texas Ranger
- William Broyles Jr., screenwriter
- Jim Lehrer, broadcast journalist

=== Season two ===
- Kay Bailey Hutchison, U.S. Senator from Texas
- Ben Crenshaw, professional golfer
- Ben Barnes, former speaker of the Texas House and former lieutenant governor of Texas
- Mark Yudof, chancellor of the University of Texas System
- Will Wynn, Mayor of Austin
- Joe Jamail, attorney
- Luci Baines Johnson and Lynda Johnson Robb, daughters of Lyndon B. Johnson
- Gloria Feldt, then president of Planned Parenthood Federation of America
- John Mackey, CEO of Whole Foods Market
- Ralph Nader, activist and perennial presidential candidate
- Darrell Royal, former head coach of the Texas Longhorns
- Sarah Bird, novelist
- Joaquin Castro and Julian Castro, state representative and councilmember from San Antonio, respectively
- Anna Quindlen, columnist
- Carole Keeton Strayhorn, Texas comptroller
- Donald Evans, U.S. Commerce Secretary
- Bruce Sterling, novelist
- Julie Speed, artist
- Jim Hightower, syndicated columnist
- Bob Edwards, radio personality
- Helen Thomas, White House reporter/columnist
- Larry Flynt, pornographer
- Harry Benson, photographer
- Ray Benson, singer
- Arianna Huffington, author/blogger
- Kitty Kelley, biographer
- P. J. O'Rourke, author/humorist
- Kirbyjon Caldwell, preacher
- Catherine Crier, author/broadcast journalist
- Seymour Hersh, journalist
- Oscar Casares, novelist
- Peter Bogdanovich, director

=== Season one ===
- Sherron Watkins, Enron whistleblower
- Bill Bradley, former U.S. senator from New Jersey
- Anna Deavere Smith, playwright
- Carole Keeton Strayhorn, Comptroller of Texas
- Richard Holbrooke, diplomat
- David Dewhurst, Lieutenant Governor of Texas
- Robert Caro, historian
- Mack Brown, head coach of the University of Texas Longhorns
- Michael Dell, computer mogul
- Shawn Colvin, singer
- Gwen Ifill, host of Washington Week in Review
- Howard Dean, 2004 presidential candidate
- Kinky Friedman, singer and mystery writer
- Sarah Weddington, attorney and pro-choice activist
- Sidney Blumenthal, author and former aide to Bill Clinton
- Henry Cisneros, former mayor of San Antonio and former HUD Secretary
- The Flatlanders (Jimmie Dale Gilmore, Joe Ely, and Butch Hancock), singers
- Pat Green, singer
- Ann Richards, former governor of Texas
- Laura Miller, Mayor of Dallas
- Herb Kelleher, co-founder of Southwest Airlines
- Tim McCanlies, director
- Susan Combs, Agriculture Commissioner of Texas
- Molly Ivins, syndicated columnist
- Mark McKinnon, political strategist/media guru
- Peter Marzio, director of the Museum of Fine Arts, Houston
- Nellie Connally, former first lady of Texas
- Jerry Hall, model and actress
- Richard Linklater, director
- Norman Lear, TV producer
