= Daytripper =

Daytripper or day-tripper may refer to:

- Day-tripper or daytripper, a person undertaking a day trip, a recreational activity
- "Day Tripper", a song by the Beatles
- Daytripper (comics), a Marvel Comics character, Amanda Sefton, created in 1976 and part of the X-Men stories
- Daytripper (DC Comics), a series from DC Comics' imprint Vertigo, created in 2010
- The Daytripper, an American TV show
