= Fred J. Maroon =

Fred Joseph Maroon (Note: Arabic: فؤاد جوزاف مارون, romanized: Fūʾād Jōzēf Mārūn) (September 24, 1924 – November 5, 2001) was an American photographer who worked in a breadth of photographic categories over his career. A trained architect, he worked in fashion, travel, portraiture, food and architectural photography but is probably best known for his extensive coverage of the Nixon administration before, during and through the Watergate scandal. He was the father of guitarist Paul Maroon from indie rock band The Walkmen.

== Early life ==
Born to a Lebanese family in New Brunswick, New Jersey, Maroon began his interest in photography with a Kodak Brownie camera. His mother famously threw it out a second-story window one day claiming he was wasting too much time with it and ignoring his paper route. He served as a signalman in World War II and studied architecture at the Catholic University of America in Washington, DC, where he was editor-in-chief of the school yearbook, The Cardinal. In 1950 he won a scholarship from Columbia University to study architecture at the Ecole des Beaux-Arts in Paris, France, and during his time there, Life magazine offered to make him a "stringer" in their Paris bureau. From 1950 to 1951 he studied architecture and also traveled extensively through post-war Europe. He went to 19 different countries capturing the history, devastation and rebirth he found on the continent.

== Career ==
Though he returned to New York City to practice architecture, his photographs of Europe caught the eye of Edward Steichen, then the curator of the Museum of Modern Art, for an exhibition he was doing called Always the Young Strangers. it was this exhibition that led to Maroon's permanent professional move from architecture to photography.

Through the second half of the 20th century, Maroon did a series of coffee-table books and photographed for many leading magazines. Among these were his most exotic work, a series of eight fashion stories he did in the late 1960s and early '70s in remote and challenging locations. In addition to two fashion stories in the USSR (Leningrad and Moscow, both in 1967) were Mongolia (1966) and Afghanistan (1968.)

His most significant historical work was made during the Nixon administration. Maroon later wrote: "After Kennedy and Johnson nobody seemed to be running stories on the Nixon White House. The big news magazines just didn't like him, so I proposed a book." That book was Courage and Hesitation, which was published just as stories about Watergate began to break. Maroon curtailed all other stories for a couple years, realizing that something of great significance was taking place and he needed to cover it. The resulting collection begins with Nixon's 1972 reelection campaign and runs through his resignation in 1974. Because of what Maroon described as the "negative and worrisome mood" of the country, he locked away 576 rolls of Watergate film and did not allow most of his pictures to be published until 1999, when he brought out The Nixon Years, 1969–1974, White House to Watergate (Abbeville Press). The Smithsonian did an exhibition of these photographs in that year as well.

Through the 1980s and 1990s Maroon authored a series of coffee-table books on a variety of subjects, ranging from the modern US Navy Keepers of the Sea (co-authored by Edward L. Beach, Jr.) and the food of chef Jean-Louis Palladin. He also did three books on his hometown of Washington, DC. In his final two major projects, Maroon went back to his roots focusing on architectural photography. In 1993 he authored The United States Capitol and in 1996 The Supreme Court of the United States. Both books were coauthored by his wife Suzy Maroon. Each book was done under the jurisdiction of the historical society of that building and each was a thorough architectural study featuring interiors, exteriors and historic details. Over the course of these projects and his many years in Washington, DC, Maroon developed what many consider the definitive photographic collection of the city.

After his death, the Maroon family decided that the entire photographic collection would be donated to the Briscoe Center for American History at the University of Texas.

== Bibliography ==
- The Nixon Years (1999); text by Tom Wicker
- The Supreme Court of the United States (1996); text by Suzy Maroon
- The United States Capitol (1993); text by Suzy Maroon; introduction by Daniel J. Boorstin
- The Catholic University of America: Century Ended, Century Begun (1991)
- Jean Louis: Cooking with the Seasons (1989); recipes by Jean-Louis Palladin
- The English Country House: A Tapestry of Ages (1985); text by Mark Girouard
- Maroon on Georgetown (1983)
- Keepers of the Sea (1983); text by Edward L. Beach, Jr.
- The Egypt Story (1981); text by P.H. Newby
- These United States (1977); text by Hugh Sidey
- Courage and Hesitation (1971); text by Allen Drury
- Washington Magnificent Capitol (1966); text by A. Robert Smith and Eric Sevareid)
