= Family Promise =

U.S. non-profit organization

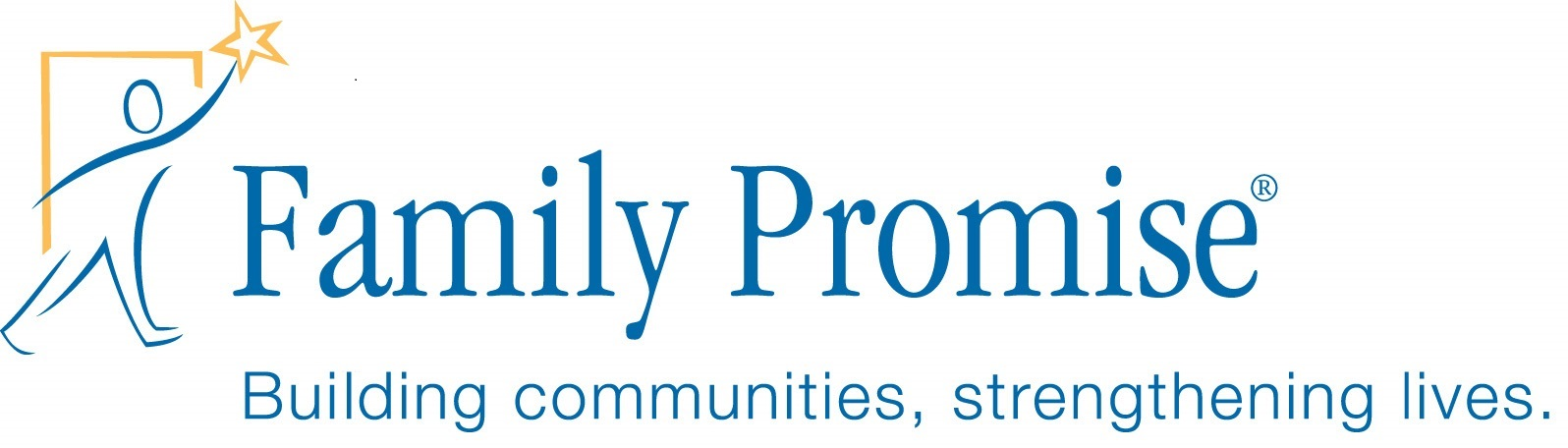
- Formation: 1988
- Founder: Karen Olson
- Type: Non-profit
- Registration no.: 501(c)(3)
- Headquarters: Summit, New Jersey
- Location: United States
- Key people: Cheryl Schuch (CEO)
- Website: familypromise.org
- Formerly called: Interfaith Hospitality Network

Family Promise (formerly National Interfaith Hospitality Network) is a national 501(c)(3) nonprofit organization in the United States, founded by Karen Olson in 1988. Family Promise primarily serves families with children who are homeless or at risk of homelessness, with the mission of "help[ing] homeless and low-income families achieve sustainable independence through a community-based response."

Family Promise organizes congregations, social service agencies and community members into volunteer coalitions called Affiliates that provide emergency shelter and wraparound services to homeless and at-risk families. The model of the core program emphasizes sustainability and relies on resources that are already available to the locales served. Though each Affiliate coordinates its own programming for transitional housing, case management, family mentoring, financial literacy classes and childcare, all receive staff training and program assistance from the national office.

The national office of the organization is located in Summit, New Jersey, from where national staff develop new Affiliates and provide technical assistance to existing ones. Presently, Family Promise draws on the efforts of more than 180,000 active volunteers from both secular community organizations and a 6,000 congregation-strong interfaith coalition operating across more than 200 affiliates, in 42 U.S. states.

== History ==
In 1982, philanthropist Karen Olson was on her way to a New York City business meeting for her work as a marketing executive for Warner–Lambert (now Pfizer), where Olson developed promotional campaigns for consumer products. On impulse, Olson stopped outside Grand Central Terminal to buy a sandwich for a homeless woman she had noticed previously. As Olson handed the woman the sandwich and started to walk away, the woman held onto her hand to initiate conversation. Olson realized that the homeless woman wanted more than just a sandwich, that she wanted human interaction. She learned the woman, whose name was Millie, was once married and had two children. Through the conversation, Olson learned how homelessness can cause profound feelings of diminished self-worth and disconnection from society. The encounter motivated Olson and her sons to begin handing out bagged lunches to homeless people in the city.

Olson soon learned that homelessness also impacted many persons in her own home community of Union County, New Jersey, and she was surprised by the large proportion of children in the homeless population. She decided to leave her marketing career and instead focus on helping families in need. Olson organized a conference of 200 people from the local religious and service communities, and brought their attention to the high incidence of homelessness among families in the county. Through subsequent meetings, the new group concluded that traditional shelters could not adequately address the challenges homeless families faced, but that the community itself did have the services and resources necessary to move families from homelessness to sustainable independence.

Olson and the group went on to establish the Interfaith Council for the Homeless of Union County in October 1986, a network consisting of initially eleven diverse congregations that would provide shelter and meals to families on a rotating basis. The Interfaith Council coordinated with the local YMCA for morning shower arrangements and to use their space as a day center where the Council would help families connect with services and job opportunities. The Council also negotiated with a local car dealer for a generous discount on a van which would serve to transport the families. Within six weeks from the start of the Interfaith Council's programming, all the families being served were able to secure affordable housing.

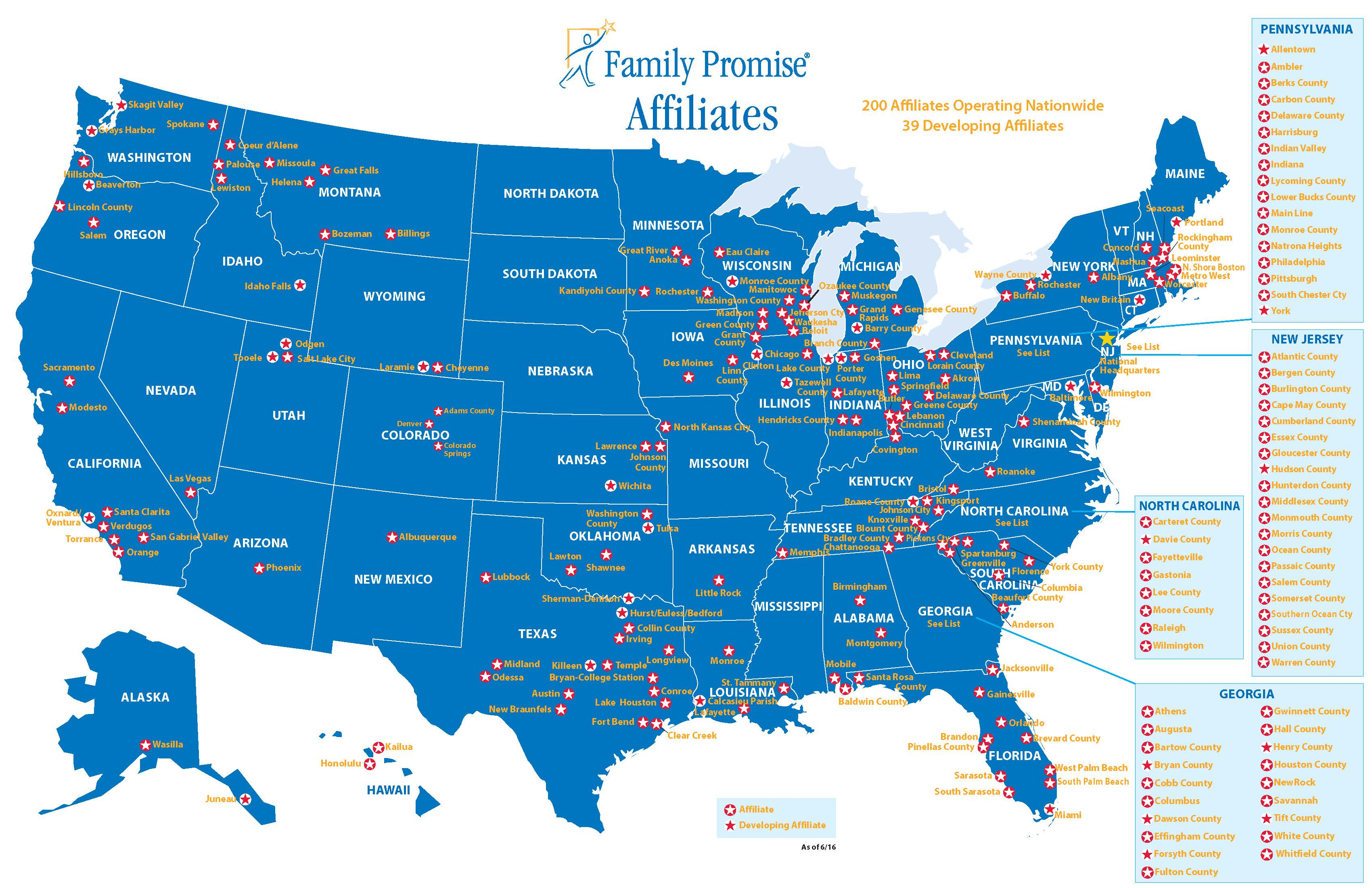
Family Promise Affiliate Map

The Interfaith Council for the Homeless of Union County developed and implemented Family Promise's core emergency shelter program, which became the model for similar initiatives across the country. Soon after the Union County network opened its doors, a second New Jersey network of congregations began Interfaith Council operations and the model continued to spread. In 1988, Olson organized the initiatives in New Jersey and those started in other states into the National Interfaith Hospitality Network (NIHN) and opened a central office in Summit, New Jersey. The national office helps each Affiliate tailor programming to their localized needs of community outreach, family mentoring and social advocacy. National programming was also expanded from providing emergency shelter to focus on addressing the underlying causes of homelessness through provision of long-term assistance to low-income families in the form of job training, parenting classes, a financial literacy curriculum and transitional and permanent housing.

In January 2003, NIHN became Family Promise to reflect the broad range of programming the organization offers in its mission to end family homelessness. The new name was intended to convey both 'promise' in the sense of commitment of communities to families in need and also 'promise' in the sense of inherent potential of each family to achieve independence. Most Affiliates adopted the name change, though some opted to continue operating under older Interfaith Hospitality Network (IHN) moniker. Olson retired as President of Family Promise in January 2016; Claas Ehlers, Family Promise's then-Director of Affiliate Services, succeeded Olson as President. Family Promise has more than 200 Affiliates across 42 states and to date has served more than 700,000 individuals, the majority of whom are children.

== Volunteers ==
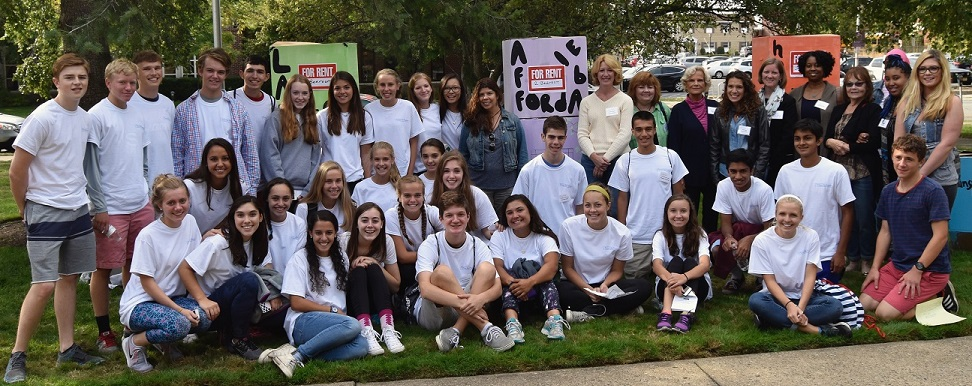
Volunteers at the 2015 Union County, New Jersey All Pursue the Promise fundraising event

Each Family Promise Affiliate engages between 800 and 1,000 volunteers every year, and these volunteers also function as a support system for the families the Affiliate serves. The personal interaction of volunteers with homeless persons helps the community see the "human face" of homelessness, to realize the nigh impossibility of parenting while homeless and understand the heighten vulnerability of children. Volunteers maintain the host congregations' facilities and also help guests find housing, jobs and job training opportunities. Volunteers often remain in contact with former guests, either informally as individuals or through organized extended support programs, helping the newly housed families maintain long-term self-sufficiency. Many Affiliates' programs and services also benefit from volunteers' particular skills, e.g. accounting, legal, medical and dentistry expertise.

== Family Promise National ==
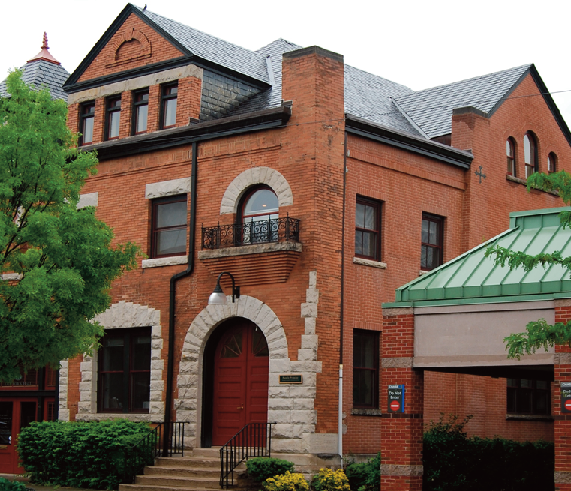
Office building in Summit, New Jersey

Family Promise's national office works to support existing Affiliates and to develop Affiliates in communities where there is both an identified critical need for services as well as strong community support for providing those services. The national office assesses the degree of need, meets with local leadership and offers guidance on organizing community support. It provides training and support for activities such as recruiting host congregations, securing a day center, forming a board of trustees, hiring staff, developing budgets and raising funds. After an Affiliate is opened, the national office provides ongoing support through technical assistance and training to ensure the Affiliate's programming remains viable over the years.

Family Promise National recognizes Affiliates' work through Family Promise Week, an annual event held during the third week of October. The national office helps participating Affiliates coordinate with local officials and personalities to celebrate the accomplishments of the Affiliate in the community they serve as well as to encourage the community to contribute funds, goods and time to the cause of ending family homelessness.

== Core programs ==
While Affiliates manage their programming according to their respective needs, the national office maintains close involvement with certain core programming for all Affiliates nationwide.

=== The Family Promise Program ===
Family Promise focuses on building community coalitions that can better utilize already available resources. The organization is nonsectarian and the program "'does not focus on the faith of the volunteer' but instead emphasizes the importance of service;" while congregations provide shelter space, both guests and volunteers come from diverse backgrounds. Congregations recruit volunteers to assist families during their overnight stays at houses of worship, while social agencies provide space for use as a day center where families can receive the appropriate services. Each Affiliate is typically supported by 800 to 1,000 volunteers from ten to thirteen houses of worship. Host congregations provide overnight shelter, meals and support services on a rotational basis for up to five families for one week every two or three months. The families who participate in the program are referred to as guests, and the program itself is often called the rotation (in reference to the rotation of congregations that providing shelter and services).

The Family Promise model is intended to be quickly replicated and implemented, while still featuring:

- Homelike Accommodations: Host congregations provide overnight lodgings and meals in a safe, private setting that allows families to sleep, stay together.
- Short Development Lead Time: Use of existing facilities eliminates the need for time to buy and renovate buildings.
- Cost Efficiency: Re-purposing existing facilities and using volunteer effort help to keep the cost of operating a Family Promise Affiliate very low relative to the cost of operating a traditional emergency shelter. The program "is funded through donations, grants and fundraising, and the first-year annual budget is estimated at $100,000 to $125,000, compared to the estimated $1 million it takes to run the typical homeless shelter."
- Comprehensive Support Services: Local social service agencies coordinate with the Director and Case Manager of an Affiliate to provide 24/7 facilities and day programs such as employment training, childcare and healthcare, and also to provide intensive case management. The Affiliate's Case Manager works closely with each family to develop individualized plans for reaching their employment, education and skills development goals, with an overriding emphasis on securing permanent affordable housing.

The strategy enables Family Promise to quickly re-house families, with, on average, 74% of families finding permanent affordable or supportive housing within nine weeks of entering the Family Promise rotational program. A fully operational Family Promise Affiliate can serve up to 200 homeless and low-income individuals annually through the rotational program.

=== Just Neighbors ===
Just Neighbors is an interactive poverty awareness curriculum that uses videos, simulations, role play, group discussion and practical exercises to help participants understand what it means to live in poverty and learn how poverty inhibits the development of children. The program consists of nine one-hour long sessions that can be used as stand-alone lessons.

=== Family Mentoring ===
Family Mentoring is a program that matches trained volunteers with families at risk of homelessness to help the latter build skills related to household budgeting, nutrition management, employment retention and parenting. Mentoring relies on supportive peer relationships to provide continued support to families who have graduated from Family Promise's rotational program.

=== Voices Uniting ===
Voices Uniting mobilizes clergy, volunteers and former program guests as an advocacy group working to affect local and state policies that help alleviate poverty and address homelessness. Voices Uniting had previously worked to support the passage of the Homeless Emergency Assistance and Rapid Transition to Housing (HEARTH) Act (a component of Helping Families Save Their Homes Act of 2009, which amended and reauthorized the McKinney–Vento Homeless Assistance Act), and the establishment of the National Housing Trust Fund (NHTF). Voices Uniting continues to lobby for adequate funding of the NHTF through its support for H.R. 1213, The Common Sense Housing Investment Act of 2013, which seeks to fund the NHTF through reform of the mortgage interest deduction.

Voices Uniting is presently engaged in the Making Homeless Families Count campaign in support of S. 256, the Homeless Children and Youth Act of 2015, which would have the United States Department of Housing and Urban Development amend its definition of homelessness to include families living 'doubled up' with friends or family as well as those temporarily staying in motels.

=== Houses for Change ===
Houses for Change is an educational crafts project that raises awareness on the issue of homelessness and raises funds for homeless shelters, food banks or other charities. Long-time Family Promise volunteer Mark Wasserman started the program to engage youth in the issue of family homelessness through practicing saving and charity habits. Children decorate house-shaped cardboard boxes to look like houses and fill them with spare change over time, much like a piggy bank. Families bring their filled boxes back to the organization that arranged the project for a communal donation to any charity of their choosing. Houses for Change has been adopted as a service project by various organizations, including schools, the United Way and the YMCA. Since 2010, the program has engaged more than 30,000 children and youth in raising more than $400,000 for charitable causes.

=== New Beginnings ===
Woodforest National Bank has partnered with Family Promise to launch New Beginnings, a comprehensive financial literacy curriculum designed to address the most pressing financial challenges of low-income families. The program was designed with the assumption that housing stability is in large part dependent on the ability to manage personal funds, and the curriculum covers a range of subjects including developing household budgets and understanding interest.

== Partnerships ==
Family Promise has partnerships with a number of corporations, including PetSmart, Woodforest National Bank and the Cabot Creamery Cooperative. These partnerships provide volunteer opportunities for corporate employees and have also resulted in several unique programs for the benefit of the homeless families Family Promise serves.

=== Woodforest National Bank ===
The Bank has partnered with Family Promise to provide funds and technical assistance for New Beginnings, the financial literacy curriculum.

=== PetSmart Promise ===
PetSmart provides accommodation and care for the pets of homeless families, providing a way for families to remain together with their animal companions while the families participate in the Family Promise program. Nearly 70 percent of U.S. households, including five to ten percent of homeless persons, have pets. A major concern for people seeking to escape abusive situations or unstable living circumstances is the welfare of their animal companion, but most shelters do not accept pets. Family Promise and PetSmart opened the first PetSmart Promise in Phoenix, Arizona, in 2012 and had 12 pet sanctuaries by end of 2015. The PetSmart Promise program offers both on-site pet sanctuaries and free off-site boarding at PetsHotels, as well as the option of pet-fostering programs for families at Affiliates without access to a sanctuary or PetsHotel.

=== Cabot Creamery Partnership ===
The Cabot Creamery Cooperative donates its goods to Family Promise Affiliates across the nation. The company also recognizes their volunteers through the annual Cabot Community Celebrity Award.

== Accountability and recognition ==
Charity Navigator has awarded Family Promise a 4/4 star rating (reflecting a current score of 99.97/100 percent) for sound fiscal management and organizational commitment to transparency and accountability four years in a row. The high marks indicate an organization's adherence to good governance and responsible execution of its mission. Family Promise's annual financial reports and IRS Form 990 filings are available on its website. In 1992, Family Promise was awarded one of twenty-one Points of Light by then-President George H.W. Bush and Barbara Bush.
