= Block 21 =

Mixed-use development in Austin, Texas, U.S.

Coordinates: 30.2657°N 97.7470°W

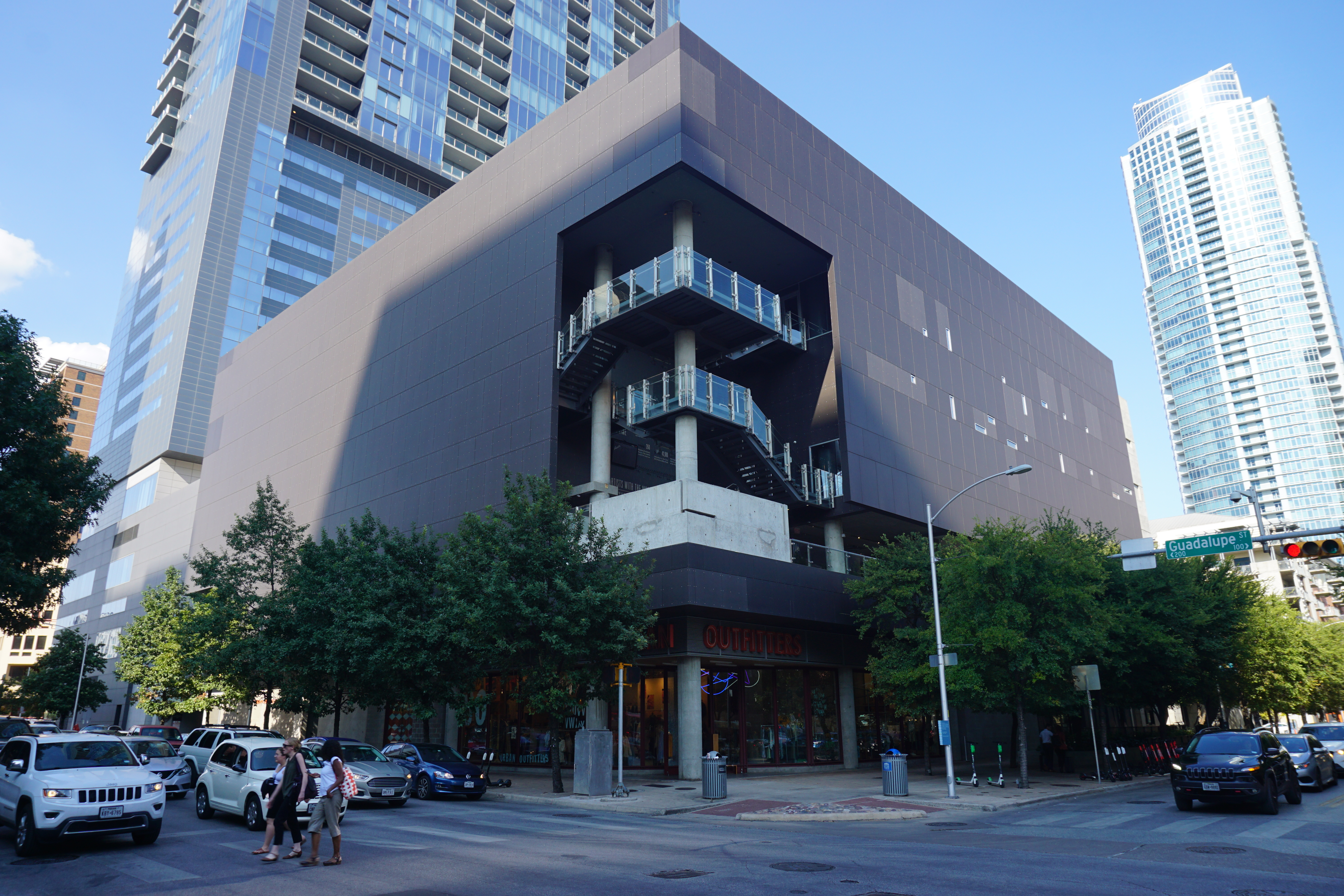
Block 21

Block 21 is a $300 million mixed-use development complex located in the Second Street District of Downtown Austin, Texas.

Austin's eighth-tallest building, the W Austin Hotel and Residences and Austin City Limits Live at The Moody Theater, the live venue where Austin City Limits is recorded, are located here, as well as 53,000 square feet (4,900 m^{2}) of shops, restaurants and office space.

The complex has been lauded for its eco-friendliness.

Block 21 was sold to Nashville based Ryman Hospitality Properties in 2022, and the Austin City Limits Live Moody Theater and 3TEN theater are operated as part of the firm's Opry Entertainment Group portfolio.
