= Karen Olsen =

Karen Olsen may refer to:

- Karen Olsen (weather presenter) on One News (New Zealand)
- Karen Olsen (Coronation Street), fictional character
- Karen Olsen, character in Familien Olsen

== See also ==
- Karen Olsen Beck
- Karen Olsson (disambiguation)
- Karin Olsson (disambiguation)
