= Austin City Limits =

American television music program

- Created by: Bill Arhos; Paul Bosner; Bruce Scafe
- Directed by: Bruce Scafe (1976–1977); Charles Vaughn (1978); Clark Santee (1979); Allan Muir (1980–82); Gary Menotti (1983–present)
- Narrated by: Terry Lickona (1979–present)
- Theme music composer: Gary P. Nunn
- Opening theme: "London Homesick Blues"
- Country of origin: United States
- No. of seasons: 50
- No. of episodes: 900

Production
- Running time: 60 minutes
- Production company: Austin PBS

Original release
- Network: PBS
- Release: January 3, 1976 – present

Austin City Limits is an American live music television program recorded and produced by Austin PBS. The show helped Austin become widely known in the United States as the "Live Music Capital of the World", and is the only television show to receive the National Medal of Arts, which it was awarded in 2003. It also won a rare institutional Peabody Award in 2011 "for its more than three decades of presenting and preserving eclectic American musical genres". Austin City Limits is produced by Austin PBS under the Capital of Texas Public Telecommunications Council. The show was created in 1974 by Bill Arhos, Bruce Scafe, and Paul Bosner.

Beginning in season 15 (1990), Austin City Limits began broadcasting in Dolby Surround, and continued until season 24 (1999). From 1976 to 2004 (seasons 1-29), the show was broadcast in NTSC. From 2004 to 2007 (seasons 30-32), the show was broadcast in HDTV 720p. Beginning in season 33 (2007–2008), the show began broadcasting in widescreen 1080i.

== Format ==
Each episode begins with a preview of the artist as read by executive producer Terry Lickona, which leads into an opening credit sequence. After the credits, Lickona would introduce the artist. The camera was usually positioned during the performance to permit various closeup shots. After the performance, there was an interview segment. After the interview segment, Lickona would introduce the next artist, and another interview segment, followed by the closing credits. The show consisted of two artists in a half-hour format, as well as one artist in a one hour format. Beginning in season 30 (2004–2005) and continuing to today, Lickona would ask the artist a question. Beginning in season 46, Lickona appeared on camera to introduce that night's performance, as well as the interview segments. The show was originally taped at KLRU's Studio 6A during the first 36 seasons (1976-2011). Beginning in season 37 (2011-2012), the show moved to its current home at the Moody Theater.

== Songwriters Special ==
Beginning in season 5 (1980), Austin City Limits introduced its Songwriters Special, which remained in use until season 34 (2008–2009). The first Songwriters Special included performances by Willie Nelson, Floyd Tillman, Hank Cochran, Red Lane, Whitey Shafer, and Sonny Throckmorton.

== Television pilot ==
The pilot was shot on October 17, 1974, and starred Willie Nelson. (B.W. Stevenson was actually taped the night before, but the recording was deemed unusable). The deliberate lack of production slickness plus attention to audio detail pleased even the notoriously TV-shy Nelson. Lead Marketer Ken Waggoner, and Austin City Limits creator Bill Arhos pitched the pilot to PBS as part of its 1975 pledge drive. The show's success as a fundraiser was enough for Arhos to get Austin City Limits green-lighted as a series.

== Availability ==
The show inspired the creation of the Austin City Limits Music Festival, an annual live music festival at Zilker Park in Austin. In 1982, Bill Arhos returned to Austin City Limits as the executive producer starting in season 7, and he stayed until his retirement in season 24 (1999). In 2015, Arhos died at the age of 80. In 2014, he was inducted into the Austin City Limits Hall of Fame. Some of the performances from Austin City Limits have been released as CDs and DVDs in the Live from Austin, TX series. Full episodes can also be viewed online at the show's official website. There is an Austin City Limits store at the Austin Bergstrom International Airport.

On June 21, 2012, the Rock and Roll Hall of Fame and Museum in Cleveland, Ohio, announced that nearly 40 years of Austin City Limits footage would be digitally archived "in perpetuity" at the Museum's new Library and Archives; recordings from more than 800 live performances will be made available to the public.

On September 9, 2018, Austin City Limits Radio was launched in Austin at 97.1 FM (utilizing a leased HD Radio subchannel of KGSR (93.3-HD2)), with an eclectic playlist representative of the television show's history.

== Syndication ==
In 1981, Austin City Limits began syndicating to local stations under the moniker Austin City Limits Encore. MTV Live (formerly Palladia HD) acquired rerun rights to the series in 2016 under the moniker Best of Austin City Limits. From 2002 to 2003, CMT (formerly Country Music Television) repackaged several country music-themed episodes under the moniker Best of Austin City Limits. When Austin City Limits aired on CMT, episodes ran for 42 minutes to make room for commercials, and began with an introduction by Charlie Robison and Tara McNamara. From 1992 to 1993, TNN repackaged older Austin City Limits performers under the moniker Austin Encore. The program also aired on CMT Canada from 1998 to 2002.

== Production ==
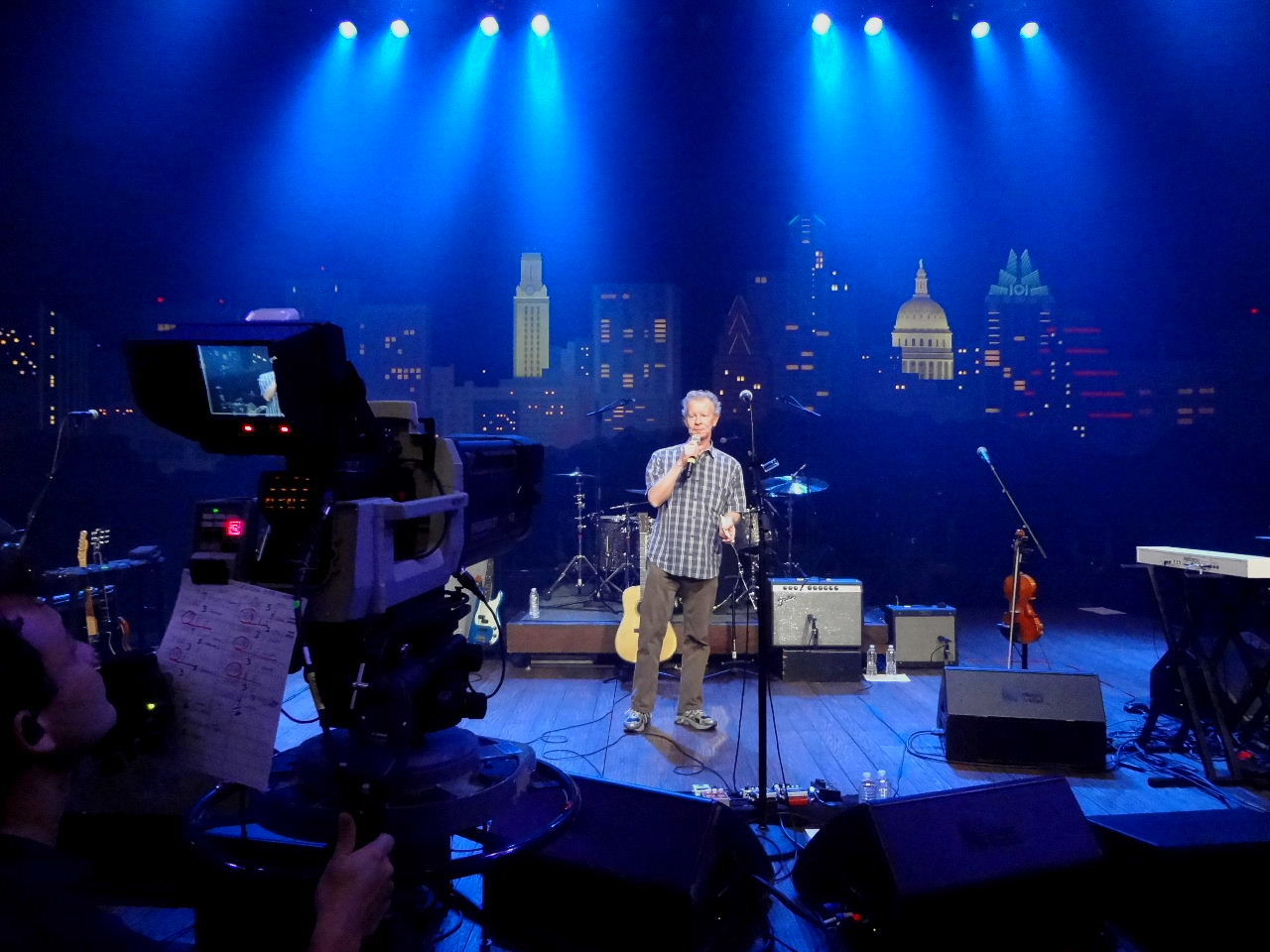
Terry Lickona – producer of Austin City Limits

Joe Gracey was talent coordinator during season 1. Executive producer Dick Peterson joined KLRU in 1984 and was promoted to Executive producer of Austin City Limits in 2000. Executive producer Terry Lickona joined the program in 1979 during season 4 as a producer and followed Peterson after Peterson's retirement in 2009. The first director of Austin City Limits was Bruce Scafe, who was the director for the show's first two seasons in 1976 and 1977; Charles Vaughn took over as producer-director in season 3 (1978); Clark Santee took over as director in season 4 (1979); Allan Muir took over as director in season 5 (1980), and he continued until season 7 (1982); Gary Menotti replaced Allan Muir as the show's current director starting in season 8 (1983). The boom crane used throughout the show's tenure at studio 6B was the original boom crane used in The Wizard of Oz.

== Venues ==
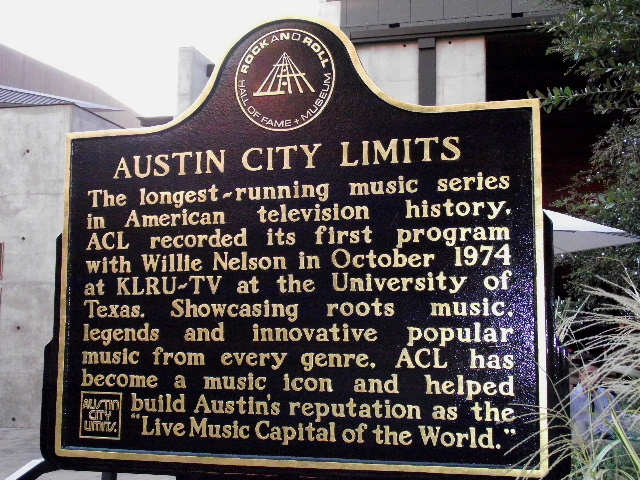
Austin City Limits sign at ACL Live – Moody Theater in Austin, TX (2012)

For the first 36 seasons, Austin City Limits was taped at Studio 6A in the Communications Building B on the University of Texas at Austin campus, on a stage featuring a mock skyline of Austin in the background, which was introduced in season 7 (1982). The studio had a seating capacity of approximately 800, but due to limited access to fire exits the audience size was limited to 300. In 2010, the show and its original studio were inducted into the Rock and Roll Hall of Fame. A plaque near the entrance to Communications Building B commemorating the occasion proclaims Austin City Limits as the "longest running music show in the history of American television". On February 26, 2011, Austin City Limits held its first taping in its new purpose-built Austin City Limits Live at The Moody Theater in downtown Austin's Block 21. The additional seating capacity of 2,750 is used for an estimated 100 concerts and 100 private events per year at the venue.

== 40th season ==
On December 2, 2014, in celebration of Austin City Limits' 40th season, a DVD titled Austin City Limits Celebrates 40 Years was released.

== Hall of Fame ==
Established as part of the 40th anniversary of Austin City Limits in 2014.

- Bill Arhos (2014)
- Stevie Ray Vaughan and Double Trouble (2014)
- Darrell Royal (2014)
- Lloyd Maines (2014)
- Willie Nelson (2014)
- Asleep at the Wheel (2015)
- Townes Van Zandt (2015)
- Loretta Lynn (2015)
- ACL Season One Crew (2015)
- Guy Clark (2015)
- Flaco Jiménez (2015)
- Dick Peterson (2016)
- B. B. King (2016)
- Bonnie Raitt (2016)
- Kris Kristofferson (2016)
- The Neville Brothers (2017)
- Roy Orbison (2017)
- Rosanne Cash (2017)
- Marcia Ball (2018)
- Ray Charles (2018)
- Los Lobos (2018)
- Lyle Lovett (2019)
- Buddy Guy (2019)
- Shawn Colvin (2019)
- Alejandro Escovedo (2021)
- Wilco (2021)
- Lucinda Williams (2021)
- Sheryl Crow (2022)
- Joe Ely (2022)
- John Prine (2023)
- Trisha Yearwood (2023)
- Garth Brooks (2024)
- My Morning Jacket (2025)
- Brandi Carlile (2026)

== Sets ==
For the first 36 seasons, Austin City Limits was taped in Studio 6A, with sets designed by Augie Kymmel and Robert Sertner. The sets included one resembling a dark room, another featuring red and blue lights, a third with horse fences, as well as the most iconic set with the Austin skyline backdrop. The show moved to the Moody Theater in season 37 (2011–12).

== Theme song ==
In season 1, a soundcheck was run by producer Paul Bosner. From 1977 to 2004 (seasons 2–29), Austin City Limits used Gary P. Nunn's "London Homesick Blues" as the show's theme song. From 1982 to 1998 (seasons 7–23), the opening theme music was performed by John Mills. From 2000 to 2004 (seasons 25–29), the opening theme music was arranged by Tequila Mockingbird. From 2004 to 2007 (seasons 30–32), the opening theme music was composed by Austin musician Charlie Sexton. From 2011 to 2014 (seasons 37–39), the opening theme music was "An Introduction", written and performed by Explosions in the Sky. The opening sequence was created by Jonathan Jackson. For season 40, "Travis County Line" by Austin native Gary Clark Jr. became the theme. In season 41, a new theme music was introduced. For seasons 43–44, "History of Women" by The Black Angels became the theme. For season 45, the opening theme music was "Hot Thoughts" by Spoon. For season 46, the opening theme music was "Colors" by Black Pumas.

== See also ==
- Sessions at West 54th: a short-lived public television series that also featured music performances
- Soundstage: similar program from WTTW in Chicago
- Music of Austin
- Austin City Limits Music Festival
