= Karin Olsson =

Karin Olsson may refer to:

- Karin Olsson (canoeist) (born 1961), Swedish sprint canoer
- Karin Margareta Olsson (born 1975), Swedish bobsledder
- Karin Olsson (politician), see List of members of the parliament of Sweden, 1994–1998
- Karin Olsson (karateka) (born 1964), Swedish karateka

== See also ==
- Karen Olsen (disambiguation)
