= The Daytripper =

- Genre: Travel documentary
- Created by: Chet Garner
- Directed by: Chet Garner; Daniel Mecey; Richard Lozano
- Starring: Chet Garner
- Country of origin: United States
- Original language: English
- No. of seasons: 15
- No. of episodes: 178

Production
- Executive producer: Chet Garner
- Running time: 25 minutes
- Production companies: Hogaboom Road, Inc.

Original release
- Network: PBS
- Release: October 9, 2009

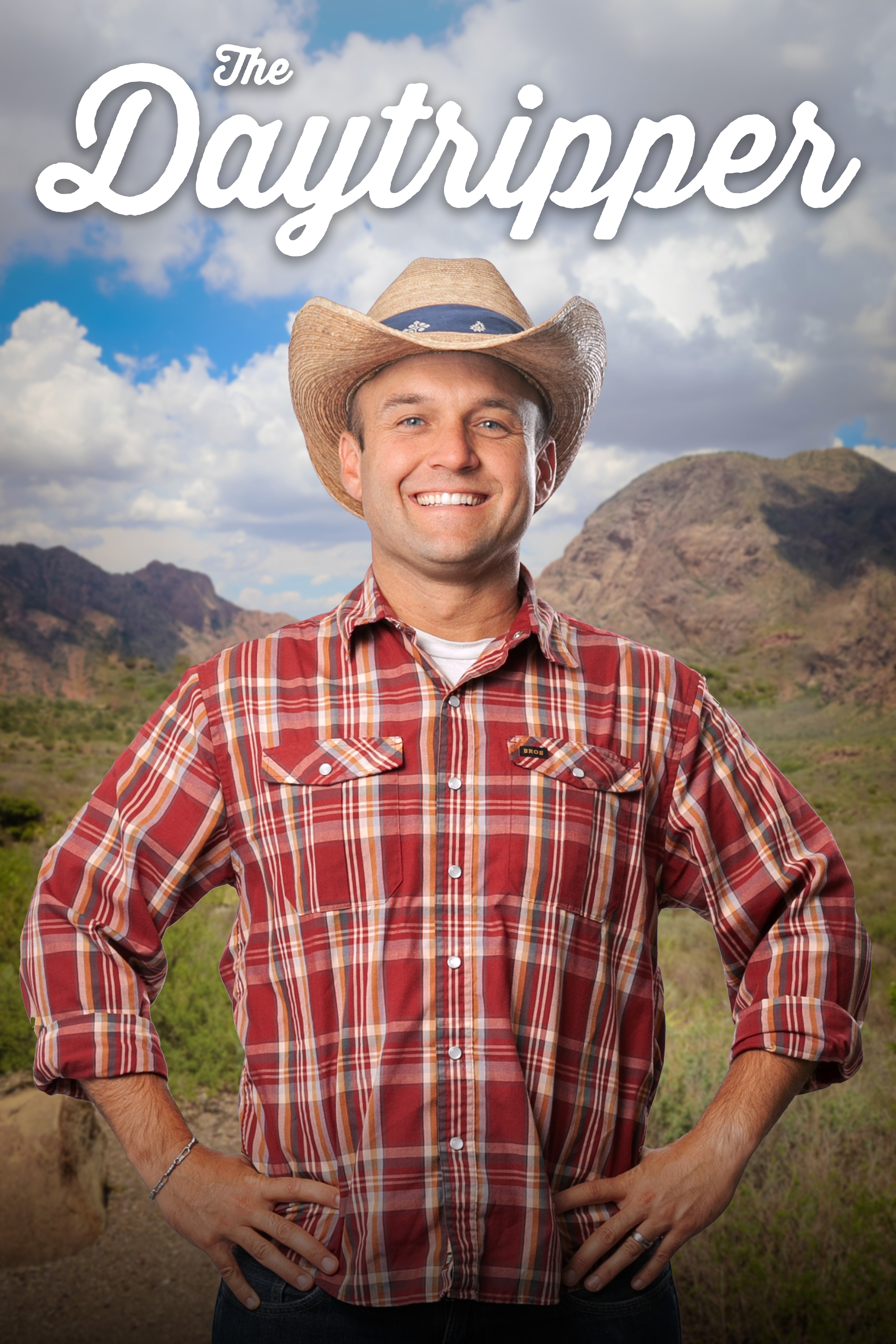
Chet Garner, Host and Executive Producer of The Daytripper TV series

The Daytripper is a Texas travel program, hosted by Chet Garner as he travels the state with his crew. The Daytripper is a 19-time Lone Star Emmy Award winning travel show airing on PBS that highlights the culture, outdoors and food of a single tourist destination or area within each episode.

Synopsis: "It’s no secret that Texas is big. Alright, more than big. Texas is HUGE!! And exploring Texas ain’t no small vacation, it’s a lifetime endeavor. But what if you only have one day? Well that’s where we come in. From the well-known landmarks to the completely obscure dives and hideaways – and all within a day’s reach. We created The Daytripper to inspire folks to get out and explore their own backyard. Adventure is much closer than you realize. I’ll see you on the road."

The series first aired on Austin's PBS station, KLRU, and was titled "The Austin Daytripper." However, the concept expanded and the show condensed its name to "The Daytripper" to have a wider appeal. The show is now produced by Hogaboom Road, Inc., a production company located in downtown Georgetown, TX that specializes in creating Texas content.

The Daytripper has aired 15 seasons. Episodes are broadcast on PBS affiliate stations in Texas and many other states around the country. They are also available for viewing online.

== The Daytripper World Headquarters ==
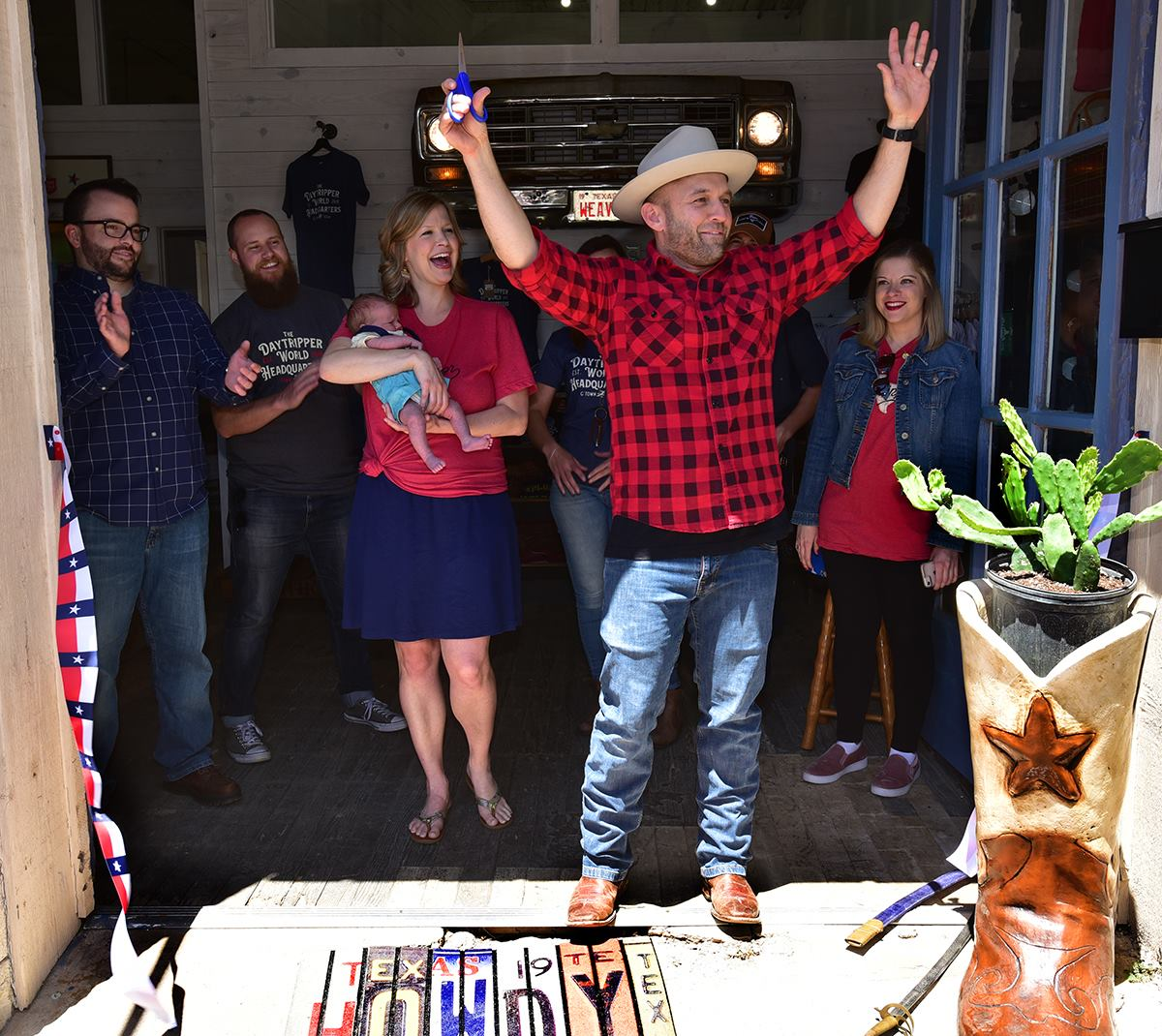
Chet cuts the ceremonial red ribbon for the Daytripper World Headquarters grand opening on April 26, 2019.

On April 26, 2019, The Daytripper announced the grand opening of its brick-and-mortar store located just off the main square in Georgetown, TX. The Daytripper World Headquarters has become a popular location for Daytripper fans from around the United States to come and visit. The store showcases many products made by local Texas artists and businesses.

== The Daytripper Field Guide App ==
On March 2, 2020 (Texas Independence Day), The Daytripper released its first official app for both Apple and Android devices. The Daytripper Field Guide is a free way for people to find food & fun using a geolocated map.

== The Talkin' Texas Podcast ==
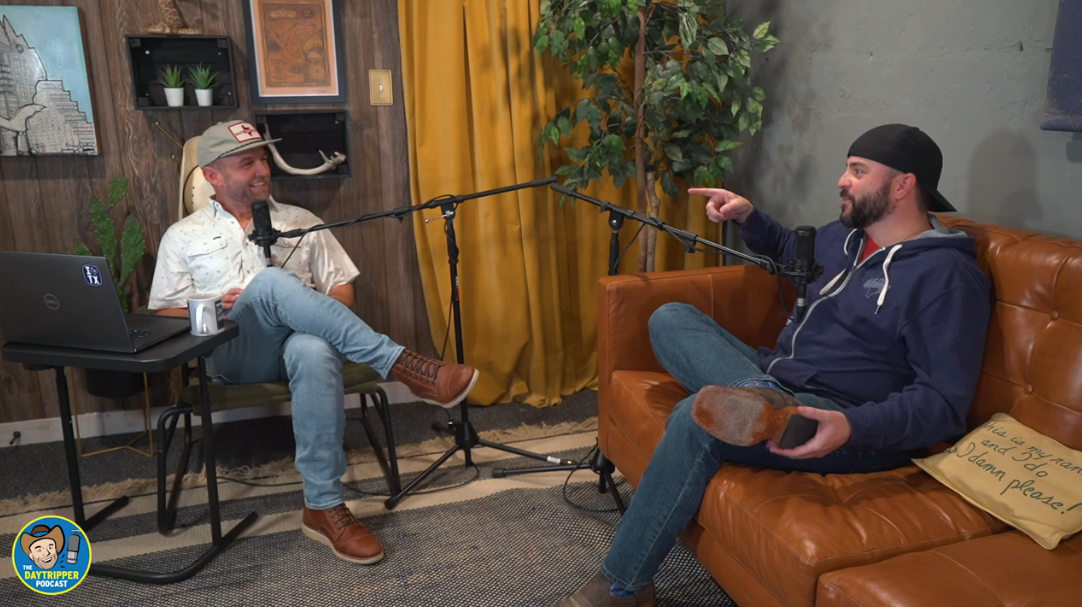
Chet Garner and Daniel Mecey "Talk Texas" on the Daytripper Podcast

"Talkin' Texas" is a podcast hosted by The Daytripper, Chet Garner, and co-host Daniel Mecey, where they discuss various Texas-related topics, including new episodes of 'The Daytripper' TV show, Texas news, Texas music minute, viewer questions and fan "rants and musings." The Texan podcast is a companion to the Daytripper television show, a travel and lifestyle series exploring different locations and stories across Texas. The Talkin' Texas podcast has started in 2015 with an audio only version but moved to a video and audio format in April of 2020.

== The Daytripper Episodes ==
=== Season 1 (2009) ===
No. overall	No. in season	Title	Directed by	Original release date
1	1	"Waco, TX"	Chet Garner	Oct 7, 2009
2	2	"Bastrop, TX"	Chet Garner	Oct 15, 2009
3	3	"Burnet, TX"	Chet Garner	Oct 22, 2009
4	4	"Luling to Shiner"	Chet Garner	Oct 29, 2009
5	5	"Fredericksburg, TX"	Chet Garner	Nov 4, 2009

=== Season 2 (2010–2011) ===
No. overall	No. in season	Title	Directed by	Original release date
6	1	"Brenham, TX"	Chet Garner	Oct 21, 2010
7	2	"Natural Bridge and Canyon Lake, TX"	Chet Garner	Oct 28, 2010
8	3	"Lockhart, TX"	Chet Garner	Nov 4, 2010
9	4	"Wimberley, TX"	Chet Garner	Nov 10, 2010
10	5	"Beaumont, TX"	Chet Garner	Nov 19, 2010
11	6	"Bryan-College Station, TX"	Chet Garner	May 19, 2011
12	7	"Llano, TX"	Chet Garner	May 26, 2011
13	8	"Galveston, TX"	Chet Garner	Jun 2, 2011
14	9	"Mineral Wells, TX"	Chet Garner	Jun 9, 2011
15	10	"South Austin, TX"	Chet Garner	Jun 23, 2011

=== Season 3 (2011–2012) ===
No. overall	No. in season	Title	Directed by	Original release date
16	1	"Fort Worth, TX"	Chet Garner	Oct 21, 2011
17	2	"Huntsville, TX"	Chet Garner	Nov 3, 2011
18	3	"Smithville, TX"	Chet Garner	Nov 9, 2011
19	4	"Spicewood, TX"	Chet Garner	Nov 16, 2011
20	5	"Goliad, TX"	Chet Garner	Nov 30, 2011
21	6	"South Padre Island, TX"	Chet Garner	May 9, 2012
22	7	"Jefferson, TX"	Chet Garner	May 16, 2012
23	8	"Killeen, TX"	Chet Garner	May 24, 2012
24	9	"Marfa, TX"	Chet Garner	May 31, 2012
25	10	"Return to Bastrop, TX"	Chet Garner	Jun 21, 2012

=== Season 4 (2012–2013) ===
No. overall	No. in season	Title	Directed by	Original release date
26	1	"Kemah, TX"	Chet Garner	Oct 11, 2012
27	2	"Stephenville, TX"	Chet Garner	Oct 18, 2012
28	3	"La Grange, TX"	Chet Garner	Oct 25, 2012
29	4	"Denton, TX"	Chet Garner	Nov 1, 2012
30	5	"Dripping Springs, TX"	Chet Garner	Nov 8, 2012
31	6	"Van Horn, TX"	Chet Garner	Nov 15, 2012
32	7	"Corpus Christi, TX"	Chet Garner	May 2, 2013
33	8	"Nacogdoches, TX"	Chet Garner	May 9, 2013
34	9	"Fort Davis, TX"	Chet Garner	May 16, 2013
35	10	"San Antonio, TX"	Chet Garner	May 23, 2013
36	11	"Kingsland, TX"	Chet Garner	May 30, 2013
37	12	"Amarillo, TX"	Chet Garner	Jun 6, 2013
38	13	"Georgetown, TX"	Chet Garner	Jun 13, 2013

=== Season 5 (2013–2014) ===
No. overall	No. in season	Title	Directed by	Original release date
39	1	"El Paso, TX"	Chet Garner	Oct 3, 2013
40	2	"Johnson City, TX"	Chet Garner	Oct 10, 2013
41	3	"San Marcos, TX"	Chet Garner	Oct 17, 2013
42	4	"Houston, TX"	Chet Garner	Oct 24, 2013
43	5	"Spooky, TX"	Chet Garner	Oct 31, 2013
44	6	"Arlington, TX"	Chet Garner	Apr 24, 2014
45	7	"Abilene, TX"	Chet Garner	May 8, 2014
46	8	"Lufkin, TX"	Chet Garner	May 15, 2014
47	9	"Mason, TX"	Chet Garner	May 22, 2014
48	10	"Orange, TX"	Chet Garner	May 29, 2014

=== Season 6 (2014–2015) ===
No. overall	No. in season	Title	Directed by	Original release date
49	1	"State Fair of Texas, TX"	Chet Garner	Sep 29, 2014
50	2	"Marble Falls, TX"	Chet Garner	Oct 6, 2014
51	3	"Lubbock, TX"	Chet Garner	Oct 13, 2014
52	4	"Port Lavaca, TX"	Chet Garner	Oct 20, 2014
53	5	"Grapevine, TX"	Chet Garner	Oct 27, 2014
54	6	"Athens, TX"	Chet Garner	Dec 8, 2014
55	7	"Baytown, TX"	Chet Garner	Dec 15, 2014
56	8	"Kingsville, TX"	Chet Garner	Dec 22, 2014
57	9	"Round Rock, TX"	Chet Garner	Apr 29, 2015
58	10	"Monahans, TX"	Chet Garner	May 6, 2015
59	11	"Schulenburg, TX"	Chet Garner	May 13, 2015
60	12	"Devils River, TX"	Chet Garner	May 20, 2015
61	13	"Tomball, TX"	Chet Garner	May 27, 2015

=== Season 7 (2015–2016) ===
No. overall	No. in season	Title	Directed by	Original release date
62	1	"East Austin, TX"	Chet Garner	Sep 30, 2015
63	2	"Granbury, TX"	Chet Garner	Oct 3, 2015
64	3	"Alpine, TX"	Chet Garner	Oct 14, 2015
65	4	"Blanco, TX"	Chet Garner	Oct 21, 2015
66	5	"Rockport-Fulton, TX"	Chet Garner	Oct 28, 2015
67	6	"Balmorhea, TX"	Chet Garner	Jan 6, 2016
68	7	"Sulphur Springs, TX"	Chet Garner	Jan 13, 2016
69	8	"San Angelo, TX"	Chet Garner	Jan 20, 2016
70	9	"Dallas, TX"	Chet Garner	Feb 20, 2016
71	10	"New Braunfels, TX"	Chet Garner	Feb 27, 2016
72	11	"Richmond, TX"	Chet Garner	May 13, 2016
73	12	"Turkey, TX"	Chet Garner	May 20, 2016
74	13	"Hillsboro, TX"	Chet Garner	May 28, 2016

=== Season 8 (2016–2017) ===
No. overall	No. in season	Title	Directed by	Original release date
75	1	"Big Bend National Park (Part 1)"	Chet Garner	Oct 6, 2016
76	2	"Big Bend & Terlingua, TX"	Chet Garner	Oct 13, 2016
77	3	"Taylor, TX"	Chet Garner	Oct 20, 2016
78	4	"Conroe, TX"	Chet Garner	Oct 27, 2016
79	5	"Boerne, TX"	Chet Garner	Nov 3, 2016
80	6	"San Antonio, TX"	Chet Garner	Feb 9, 2017
81	7	"Palestine, TX"	Chet Garner	Feb 16, 2017
82	8	"Glen Rose, TX"	Chet Garner	Feb 23, 2017
83	9	"Port Aransas, TX"	Richie Lozano	May 11, 2017
84	10	"Mt. Pleasant, TX"	Richie Lozano	May 18, 2017
85	11	"Laredo, TX"	Richie Lozano	May 25, 2017
86	12	"San Saba, TX"	Richie Lozano	Jun 1, 2017
87	13	"Victoria, TX"	Richie Lozano	Jun 8, 2017

=== Season 9 (2017–2018) ===
No. overall	No. in season	Title	Directed by	Original release date
88	1	"Belton, TX"	Richie Lozano	Oct 7, 2017
89	2	"North Padre Island, TX"	Richie Lozano	Oct 14, 2017
90	3	"Hico, TX"	Richie Lozano	Oct 21, 2017
91	4	"Lake Travis, TX"	Richie Lozano	Oct 28, 2017
92	5	"Houston, TX"	Richie Lozano	Nov 4, 2017
93	6	"Sweetwater, TX"	Richie Lozano	Feb 3, 2018
94	7	"Round Top, TX"	Richie Lozano	Feb 10, 2018
95	8	"Jacksonville, TX"	Richie Lozano	Feb 17, 2018
96	9	"Bandera, TX"	Richie Lozano	May 5, 2018
97	10	"Nocona, TX"	Richie Lozano	May 12, 2018
98	11	"Seminole Canyon, TX"	Richie Lozano	May 19, 2018
99	12	"Route 66, TX"	Richie Lozano	May 26, 2018
100	13	"100th Episode Special"	Chet Garner	Jun 2, 2018

=== Season 10 (2018–2019) ===
No. overall	No. in season	Title	Directed by	Original release date
101	1	"Bellville, TX"	Richie Lozano	Oct 6, 2018
102	2	"Colorado Bend State Park, TX"	Richie Lozano	Oct 13, 2018
103	3	"Crockett, TX"	Richie Lozano	Oct 20, 2018
104	4	"Pflugerville, TX"	Richie Lozano	Oct 27, 2018
105	5	"Rockwall, TX"	Richie Lozano	Nov 3, 2018
106	6	"Brownsville, TX"	Richie Lozano	Feb 2, 2019
107	7	"Uvalde, TX"	Richie Lozano	Feb 9, 2019
108	8	"Frisco, TX"	Richie Lozano	Feb 16, 2019
109	9	"Midland, TX"	Richie Lozano	May 4, 2019
110	10	"Odessa, TX"	Richie Lozano	May 11, 2019
111	11	"Port Isabel, TX"	Richie Lozano	May 18, 2019
112	12	"Seguin, TX"	Richie Lozano	May 25, 2019
113	13	"Wichita Falls, TX"	Richie Lozano	Jun 1, 2019

=== Season 11 (2019–2020) ===
No. overall	No. in season	Title	Directed by	Original release date
114	1	"Return to Waco, TX"	Richie Lozano	Oct 5, 2019
115	2	"Davis Mountains, TX"	Chet Garner	Oct 12, 2019
116	3	"Kerrville, TX"	Richie Lozano	Oct 19, 2019
117	4	"Longview, TX"	Daniel Mecey	Oct 26, 2019
118	5	"Salado, TX"	Chet Garner	Nov 2, 2019
119	6	"Port Arthur, TX"	Chet Garner	Feb 1, 2020
120	7	"Brady, TX"	Chet Garner	Feb 8, 2020
121	8	"Tyler, TX"	Richie Lozano	Feb 15, 2020
122	9	"Waxahachie, TX"	Chet Garner	May 2, 2020
123	10	"Spring, TX"	Richie Lozano	May 9, 2020
124	11	"Palacios, TX"	Richie Lozano	May 16, 2020
125	12	"McKinney, TX"	Chet Garner	May 23, 2020
126	13	"Texas Capital, TX"	Richie Lozano	May 30, 2020

=== Season 12 (2020–2021) ===
No. overall	No. in season	Title	Directed by	Original release date
127	1	"Lampasas, TX"	Daniel Mecey	Oct 3, 2020
128	2	"Texas Burger Road Trip"	Richie Lozano	Oct 10, 2020
129	3	"Texas Swimming Hole Road Trip"	Daniel Mecey	Oct 17, 2020
130	4	"Texas World Food Tour"	Daniel Mecey	Oct 24, 2020
131	5	"Texas Revolution Road Trip"	Daniel Mecey	Oct 31, 2020
132	6	"Luckenbach, TX"	Daniel Mecey	Feb 6, 2021
133	7	"Texas Tacos Road Trip"	Daniel Mecey	Feb 13, 2021
134	8	"Strangest Road Trip"	Daniel Mecey	Feb 20, 2021
135	9	"Graham, TX"	John Mark Clawson	May 1, 2021
136	10	"Texas BBQ Road Trip"	Daniel Mecey	May 8, 2021
137	11	"Texas State Parks Road Trip"	Daniel Mecey	May 15, 2021
138	12	"Adrenaline, TX"	Daniel Mecey	May 22, 2021
139	13	"Largest, Longest, Tallest, Smallest Road Trip in Texas"	Daniel Mecey	May 29, 2021

=== Season 13 (2021–2022) ===
No. overall	No. in season	Title	Directed by	Original release date
140	1	"Lajitas & Big Bend State Park"	Daniel Mecey	Oct 7, 2021
141	2	"West Austin, TX"	Daniel Mecey	Oct 14, 2021
142	3	"Lake Jackson, TX"	Daniel Mecey	Oct 21, 2021
143	4	"Corsicana, TX"	Daniel Mecey	Oct 28, 2021
144	5	"Haunted Texas Road Trip"	Daniel Mecey	Nov 4, 2021
145	6	"Kilgore, TX"	Daniel Mecey	Feb 4, 2021
146	7	"Paint Rock, TX"	Daniel Mecey	Feb 11, 2021
147	8	"National Parks Road Trip"	Daniel Mecey	Feb 18, 2021
148	9	"Gruene, TX"	Daniel Mecey	May 6, 2022
149	10	"Liberty Hill, TX"	Daniel Mecey	May 6, 2022
150	11	"Castroville, TX"	Daniel Mecey	May 13, 2022
151	12	"Fort Worth, TX"	Daniel Mecey	May 27, 2022
152	13	"Dallas, TX"	Daniel Mecey	Jun 3, 2022

=== Season 14 (2023–2024) ===
No. overall	No. in season	Title	Directed by	Original release date
153	1	"Iconic Houston"	Daniel Mecey	Oct 7, 2023
154	2	"Kyle, TX"	Daniel Mecey	Oct 12, 2023
155	3	"Canton, TX"	Daniel Mecey	Oct 19, 2023
156	4	"Brownwood, TX"	Daniel Mecey	Oct 26, 2023
157	5	"1836 Texas"	Daniel Mecey	Nov 4, 2024
158	6	"Giddings, TX"	Daniel Mecey	Feb 3, 2024
159	7	"Canadian, TX"	Daniel Mecey	Feb 10, 2024
160	8	"Centerville, TX"	Daniel Mecey	Feb 17, 2024
161	9	"McGregor, TX"	Daniel Mecey	May 1, 2024
162	10	"Borger, TX"	Daniel Mecey	May 8, 2024
163	11	"Big Spring, TX"	Daniel Mecey	May 15, 2024
164	12	"Helotes, TX"	Daniel Mecey	May 22, 2024
165	13	"Temple, TX (Viewer's Choice)"	Daniel Mecey	May 29, 2024

=== Season 15 (2024-present) ===
No. overall	No. in season	Title	Directed by	Original release date
166	1	"Austin's Forty Acres & Beyond"	Daniel Mecey	Oct 7, 2024
167	2	"Menard, TX"	Daniel Mecey	Oct 14, 2024
168	3	"Denison, TX"	Daniel Mecey	Oct 21, 2024
169	4	"Eastland & Cisco, TX"	Daniel Mecey	Oct 28, 2024
170	5	"Karnes County, TX"	Chet Garner	Jan 2, 2025
171	6	"Bulverde, TX"	Daniel Mecey	Jan 9, 2025
172	7	"Plano, TX"	Daniel Mecey	Jan 16, 2025
173	8	"Jasper, TX"	Daniel Mecey	Jan 23, 2025
174	9	"Hutto, TX"	Daniel Mecey	May 1, 2025
175	10	"Mexia, TX"	Daniel Mecey	May 8, 2025
176	11	"Katy, TX"	Daniel Mecey	May 15, 2025
177	12	"Coleman, TX"	Daniel Mecey	May 22, 2025
178	13	"Paris, TX"	Daniel Mecey	May 29, 2025

=== Season 16 (2025) ===
No. overall	No. in season	Title	Directed by	Original release date
179	1	"Grand Prairie, TX"	Daniel Mecey	Oct 6, 2025
180	2	"Florence, TX"	Daniel Mecey	Oct 13, 2025
181	4	"Albany, TX"	Daniel Mecey	Oct 20, 2025
182	3	"San Antonio, TX"	Daniel Mecey	Oct 27, 2025
183	5	"Rusk, TX"	Daniel Mecey	Nov 3, 2025
184	6	"Corpus Christi, TX"	Daniel Mecey	Feb 9, 2026
185	7	"Gatesville, TX"	Daniel Mecey	Feb 16, 2026
186	8	"Yorktown, TX"	Daniel Mecey	Feb 23, 2026
187	9	"Montgomery, TX"	Daniel Mecey	April 30, 2026
188	10	"Sonora, TX"	Daniel Mecey	May 7, 2026
189	11	"Elgin, TX"	Daniel Mecey	May 14, 2026
189	12	"Palo Pinto Mountains, TX"	Daniel Mecey	May 21, 2026
190	13	"Goldthwaite, TX"	Daniel Mecey	May 28, 2026

== Awards ==
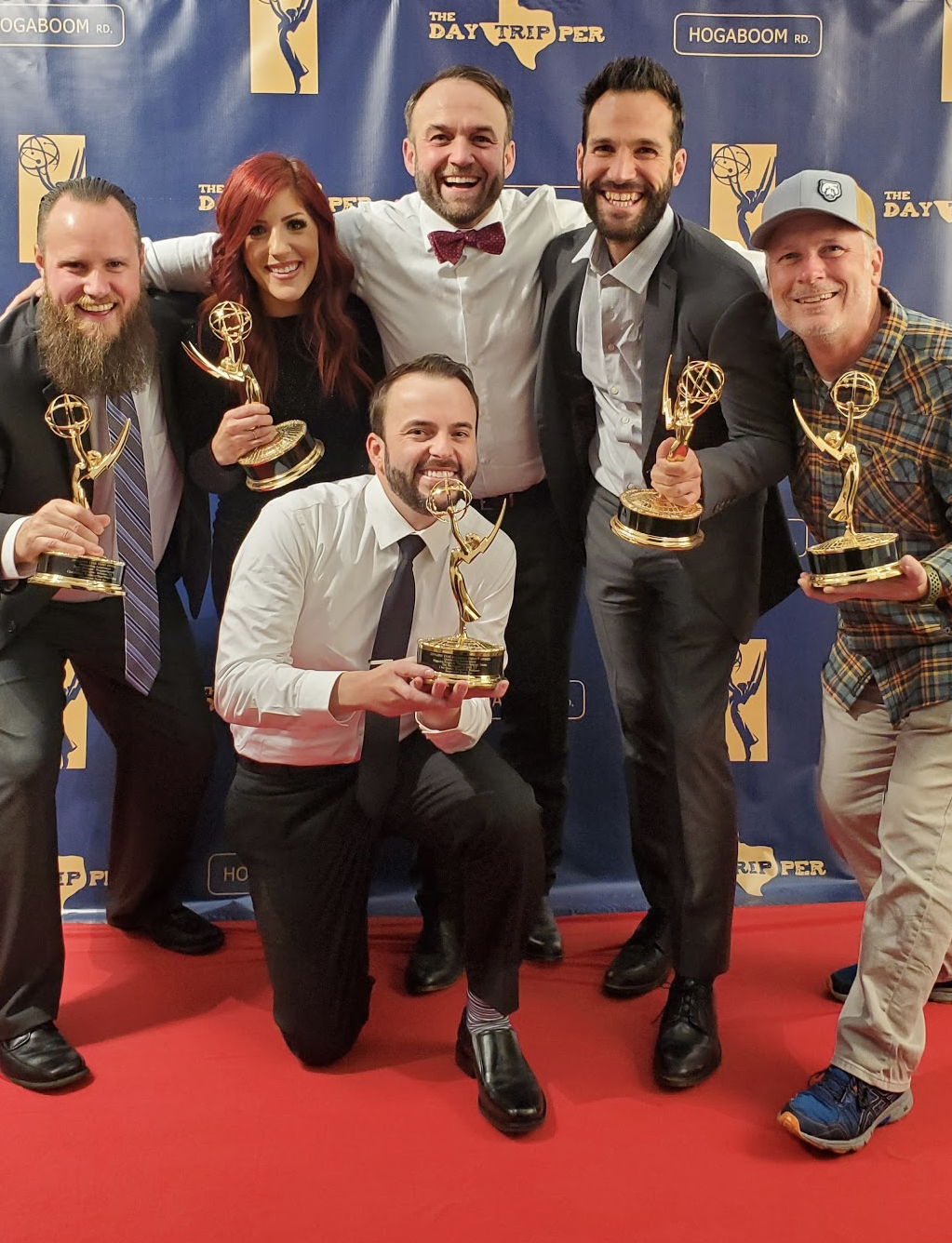
The Daytripper team wins "Best Texas Heritage" Program in the 2020 Lone Star Emmy Awards.

2025

- Lone Star Emmy Award Winner– Outstanding Program Host
- Lone Star Emmy Award Nomination– Outstanding Magazine Program (Paris, TX)
- Lone Star Emmy Award Nomination- Outstanding Texas Heritage Program (Mexia, TX)
- Lone Star Emmy Award Nomination– Outstanding Historical/Cultural Program (Menard, TX)

2024

- Lone Star Emmy Award Winner– Outstanding Magazine Program (Helotes, TX)
- Lone Star Emmy Award Winner - Outstanding Texas Heritage Program (Giddings, TX)
- Lone Star Emmy Award Winner– Outstanding Program Host

2023

- Lone Star Emmy Award Winner– Outstanding Program Host
- Lone Star Emmy Award Winner – Outstanding Magazine Program (North Dallas, TX)
- Lone Star Emmy Award Nomination – Outstanding Editor (Daniel Mecey)

2022

- Lone Star Emmy Award Winner – Outstanding Program Host
- Lone Star Emmy Award Nomination – Outstanding Magazine Program (Corsicana, TX)
- Lone Star Emmy Award Nomination – Outstanding Historic/Cultural Program (Castroville, TX)
- Lone Star Emmy Award Nomination – Outstanding Texas Heritage Program (Gruene, TX)

2021

- Lone Star Emmy Award Nomination – Outstanding Program Host
- Lone Star Emmy Award Winner – Outstanding Magazine Program (Graham, TX)
- Lone Star Emmy Award Nomination – Outstanding Texas Heritage Program (Luckenbach, TX)

2020

- Lone Star Emmy Award Winner – Outstanding Program Host
- Lone Star Emmy Award Nomination – Outstanding Politics/Government Program (Texas Capital)
- Lone Star Emmy Award Winner – Outstanding Texas Heritage Program (Tyler, TX)
- Lone Star Emmy Award Nomination – Outstanding Magazine Program (Longview, TX)

2019

- Lone Star Emmy Award Nomination – Outstanding Program Host
- Lone Star Emmy Award Winner – Outstanding Magazine Program (Seguin, TX)

2018

- Lone Star Emmy Award Winner – Outstanding Program Host
- Lone Star Emmy Award Nomination – Outstanding Magazine Program (Hidden Houston, TX)

2017

- Lone Star Emmy Award Nomination – Outstanding Magazine Program (San Saba, TX)
- Lone Star Emmy Award Nomination – Outstanding Texas Heritage Program (San Antonio, TX)

2016

- Lone Star Emmy Award Winner – Outstanding Program Host
- Lone Star Emmy Award Nomination – Outstanding Texas Heritage Program (New Braunfels, TX)

2015

- Lone Star Emmy Award Nomination – Outstanding Program Host
- Lone Star Emmy Award Nomination – Outstanding Texas Heritage Program
- Lone Star Emmy Award Nomination – Outstanding Magazine Program (Athens, TX)

2014

- Lone Star Emmy Award Winner – Outstanding Program Host

2013

- Lone Star Emmy Award Winner – Outstanding Magazine Program-Series (San Antonio, TX)
- Lone Star Emmy Award Winner – Outstanding Program Host
- Lone Star Emmy Award Nomination – Outstanding Texas Heritage Segment

2012

- Lone Star Emmy Award Winner – Outstanding Magazine Program-Series (Marfa, TX)
- Lone Star Emmy Award Nomination – Outstanding Program Host
- Lone Star Emmy Award Nomination – Outstanding Texas Heritage Program/Special

2011

- Lone Star Emmy Award Winner – Outstanding Achievement in a Texas Heritage Program/Special (Brenham, TX)
- Lone Star Emmy Award Nomination – Outstanding Program Host
- Lone Star Emmy Award Nomination – Outstanding Editor – Program (non-news)

2010

- Lone Star Emmy Award Winner – Outstanding Texas Heritage Program/Special (Bastrop, TX)
- Lone Star Emmy Award Nomination – Outstanding Program Host
- Lone Star Emmy Award Nomination – Outstanding Achievement in a Magazine Program
