= KLRU =

Television station in Austin, Texas

- Austin, Texas; United States
- Channels: Digital: 22 (UHF); Virtual: 18
- Branding: Austin PBS

Programming
- Affiliations: 18.1: PBS; for others, see § Subchannels

Ownership
- Owner: Capital of Texas Public Telecommunications Council

History
- First air date: May 4, 1979 (satellite of KLRN until 1986)
- Former call signs: KLRU-TV (May 4, 1979–August 22, 1979)
- Former channel numbers: Analog: 18 (UHF, 1979–2009)
- Call sign meaning: disambiguation of its former television partner KLRN

Technical information
- Licensing authority: FCC
- Facility ID: 8564
- ERP: 700 kW
- HAAT: 357.5 m (1,173 ft)
- Transmitter coordinates: 30°19′19″N 97°48′12″W

Links
- Public license information: Public file; LMS
- Website: www.austinpbs.org

KLRU (channel 18), branded as Austin PBS, is a PBS member television station in Austin, Texas, United States, owned by the Capital of Texas Public Telecommunications Council. In 2022, KLRU moved into its "Austin Media Center" studios located on the Austin Community College Highland Campus, which was redeveloped from the former Highland Mall. KLRU occupies 45,000 square feet (4,181 m^{2}) in what was previously the mall's Dillard's department store. The station's transmitter is located in the West Austin Antenna Farm in unincorporated Travis County. In addition to airing program content from PBS, it produces original programming including the national music series Austin City Limits.

KLRU was founded in 1979 as a full-time satellite of San Antonio PBS member KLRN. That station had long doubled as the PBS member for Austin as well, but provided a marginal signal at best to much of Austin's inner ring. Soon after KLRU was brought on line, its owner, the Southwest Texas Public Broadcasting Council, laid the groundwork for repurposing it as a full-fledged PBS station for the Austin area. This culminated in 1986, when KLRU severed the electronic umbilical cord with KLRN and became a separately-programmed station. A year later, the Capital of Texas Public Broadcasting Council was formed as KLRU's owner.

== History ==
When KLRN in San Antonio was built, it was intended to serve as the National Educational Television station for both San Antonio and Austin. While there was interest in building a public television station in Austin, there was not enough funding until the University of Texas at Austin got involved. It had studios in both cities (in Austin, at the Jesse H. Jones Communications Center on the UT campus). In hopes of providing enough signal to reach both San Antonio and Austin, the transmitter was located in New Braunfels, a suburb of San Antonio located halfway between the two cities. This arrangement proved insufficient to cover all of Travis and Williamson counties, and reception in Austin had been poorer than expected due to intervening hilly terrain. It did not help that Austin is 54 mi (87 km) north of New Braunfels, leaving it with only secondary coverage from KLRN.

The Southwest Texas Public Broadcasting Council, owner of KLRN, filed to build a new television station on Austin's non-commercial reserved channel 18 in 1975 and received a construction permit on September 3, 1976. It was to serve as a full-time satellite of KLRN, and was primarily intended to reach up to 100,000 homes in Austin's inner ring where KLRN coverage was poor or nonexistent. Austin ABC affiliate KVUE leased space on its transmitter for the new station.

In 1978, KLRN began a public fundraising drive to raise the money to build KLRU. Its construction enabled 23 additional school districts to benefit from the station's educational programming. The transmitter was activated on April 24, 1979, and programs began May 4. Born at a time when its ownership was embroiled in other controversies involving operations, the station's first license was only for one year due to misrepresentations over matching donations during the fund drive.

From the moment KLRU signed on, officials envisioned a future in which KLRN and KLRU were separate, locally-focused PBS member stations. Only a year after KLRU hit the airwaves, it received its own Austin-based governing board, though it continued under the ownership of the Southwest Texas Public Broadcasting Council. In 1984, KLRN moved to a new tower in San Antonio. Two years later, for financial reasons, officials began exploring an outright split of the two stations. In particular, they believed a split would allow KLRU to be "a better (corporate) citizen" in Austin and use its longstanding ties to UT to increase local programming. The split was approved in September 1986 and took place in two stages. Separate branding for both stations was instituted on October 1, 1986. In 1987, the two stations officially went their separate ways when the Southwest Texas Public Broadcasting Council split into two nonprofit organizations, with KLRU coming under the ownership of the Capital of Texas Public Broadcasting Council.

In addition to the Austin market, KLRU claims Bell and Falls counties, which are in the Waco–Temple–Bryan market, as part of its primary coverage area. It became the default PBS member for the western half of the Waco market via cable after KNCT ended its membership with PBS on August 31, 2018.

On November 4, 2019, the station dropped its call sign brand after 33 years and rebranded as "Austin PBS" to coincide with PBS' rebranding the same day and the 50th anniversary of the parent network.

== Programming ==
=== Programs produced by KLRU ===
- Arts In Context – Documentary series focusing on creativity and the arts. klru.org/artsincontext
- Austin City Limits – A PBS music program that helped establish Austin as the "Live Music Capital of the World".
- Austin Now – A weekly series that examines people, ideas, and issues that define Austin. (not currently in production)
- Austin Revealed – An oral history project sharing the stories of Austin's past and present to encourage discussion and thought around the city's future.
- BBQ with Franklin – Cooking tips from Aaron Franklin.
- Blackademics TV –Top Black Studies scholars engage with projects and research focused on education, performance and youth empowerment.
- Central Texas Gardener – A natural gardening program hosted by Tom Spencer.
- Civic Summit – KLRU's program for discourse on public affairs. klru.org/civicsummit
- Docubloggers – A high-tech look at the life of Austin. (no longer in production)
- In Context – A series on design, architecture, and art. (no longer in production, became Arts In Context)
- The Intergalactic Nemesis – A 17-part live-action graphic novel- a mash-up of a radio play and comic book.
- Juneteenth Jamboree – Celebrate the history and rich culture of African Americans in Central Texas. klru.org/juneteenth
- Overheard – A weekly interview series, formerly known as Texas Monthly Talks; it is hosted by Texas Tribune editor Evan Smith. klru.org/overheard
- Painted Churches of Texas – Documentary on the painted churches located in Central Texas.
- Special Session – Seen while the Texas State Legislature is in session, it is a magazine show that looks at issues that are important to Texans; it is hosted by Paul Stekler. (not currently in production)
- SXSW Presents – A feature and short film series presented by the SXSW Film Festival in association with the Austin Chronicle weekly newspaper.
- What's That, Buzz? – A 12-part web series that explores the world of sound effects and Foley. Learn how sounds effects are made and how professionals in the field do their job.

=== Programs produced in Austin and presented by KLRU ===
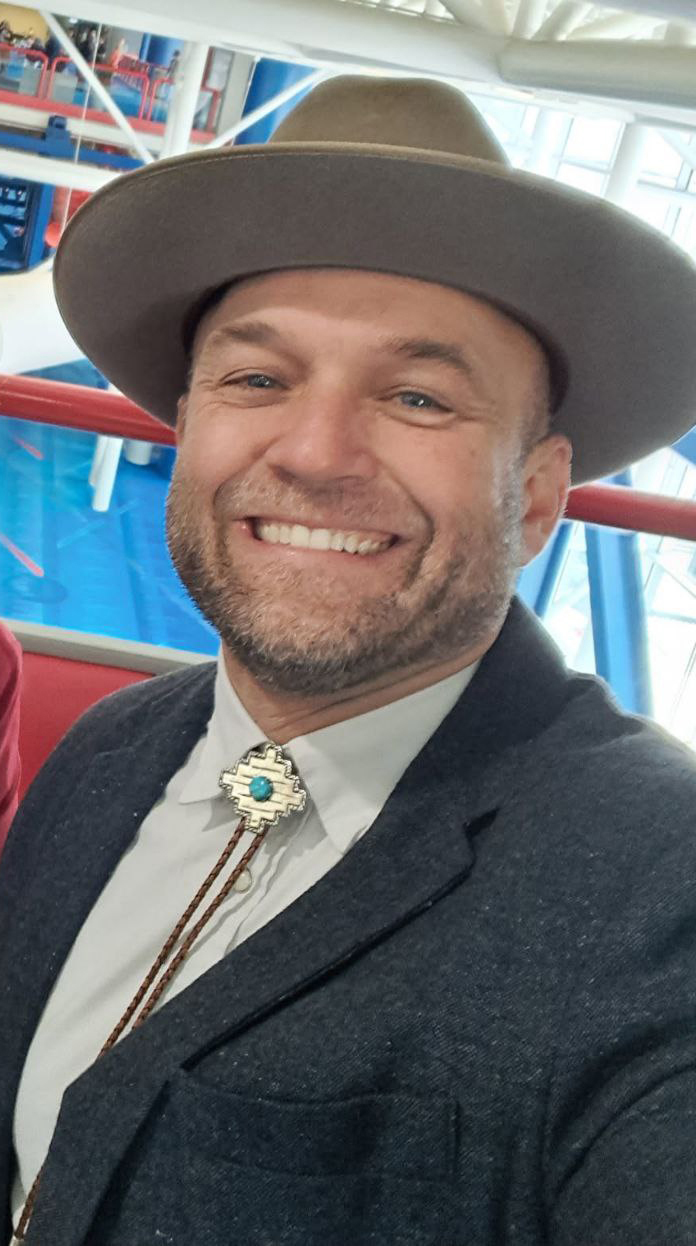
Chet Garner, Host and Executive Producer of The Daytripper TV series, at the Texas Apartment Association conference in Houston, Texas on May 7, 2025.

- The Biscuit Brothers – A television series about country music for children.
- The Daytripper – KLRU is the presenting station of the program, which is produced by Hogaboom Road, Inc., highlighting travel destinations across Texas; it is hosted by Chet Garner.
- Downtown – A weekly series spotlighting the people, places, and things associated with downtown Austin and how it differs from other cities' downtown areas. (no longer in production)
- Hardly Sound – Hardly Sound is a documentary TV series focusing on Texas underground music and artists, showcasing their stories, the creative process, and sharing a dialogue within the creative community.
- The Forgotten Americans – A 2000 documentary produced by Galán Productions for PBS
- One Square Mile: Texas – Produced by filmmakers Carl and Elisabeth Crum. One Square Mile: Texas is a documentary television series that depicts Texas culture from the perspective of distinct square miles across the Lone Star State. The series is a microcosm of Texas life and a collective portrait of the state. The series represents the many faces and facets of Texas from the perspective of the individual while spanning the emotional, demographic & physical landscapes.

== Technical information ==
=== Subchannels ===
The station's signal is multiplexed:

Subchannels of KLRU
Subchannel	Res.	Short name	Programming
18.1	1080i	KLRU-HD	PBS
18.2	480i	KLRU-CR	Create
18.3	480i	KLRU-WO	World
18.4	480i	PBSKids	PBS Kids

KLRU-Q was a locally programmed channel with PBS/KLRU encores and additional programs not aired on the primary channel. Q Night at the Movies on Saturday nights focused on film. It aired from July 1, 2009, until August 2, 2021, when it was replaced by the World Channel.

=== Analog-to-digital conversion ===
KLRU shut down its analog signal on April 16, 2009. Before shutting down the signal forever, it played its nightly sign-off from the 1970s one last time. The station's digital signal remained on its pre-transition UHF channel 22, using virtual channel 18.
