= Courage and Hesitation =

1971 non-fiction book by Allen Drury

- US first edition cover
- Author: Allen Drury
- Language: English
- Genre: Non-fiction
- Publisher: Doubleday
- Publication date: November 19, 1971
- Publication place: United States
- Media type: Print (hardcover & paperback)
- ISBN: 1-199-09536-2

Courage and Hesitation: Notes and Photographs of the Nixon Administration is a 1971 non-fiction book by Allen Drury. It is an inside look at U. S. President Richard Nixon and those closest to him midway through his first term in office, with photographs by Fred J. Maroon.

== Overview ==
Drawn from Drury's interviews with Nixon and his political and White House staff, Courage and Hesitation also contains photographs by Fred J. Maroon. Impressed by Maroon's photography of Washington, D.C., Nixon had granted the photographer's request for access to the White House in 1970. Maroon later wrote, "After Kennedy and Johnson nobody seemed to be running stories on the Nixon White House. The big news magazines just didn't like him, so I proposed a book." He continued photographing Nixon through the President's 1974 resignation, but except for what was published in Courage and Hesitation Maroon did not publish most of his Nixon work until his 1999 book The Nixon Years, 1969-1974, White House to Watergate.

In Reelpolitik II: Political Ideologies in '50s and '60s Films (2004), Beverly Merrill Kelley wrote that Drury accepted the commission to write the book despite the fact that he found Nixon to be "very weird, very odd."

== Critical reception ==
Kirkus Reviews wrote, "Unfortunately, Drury's peek behind the lace curtain came before the China initiative and the Freeze, and it all seems very old hat when Erlichman or Chotiner discuss the President's game plan." The review called the book "a creampuff bore" and "dreary, dreary, dreary".
