= Karen Olsson =

American novelist and nonfiction writer (born 1972)

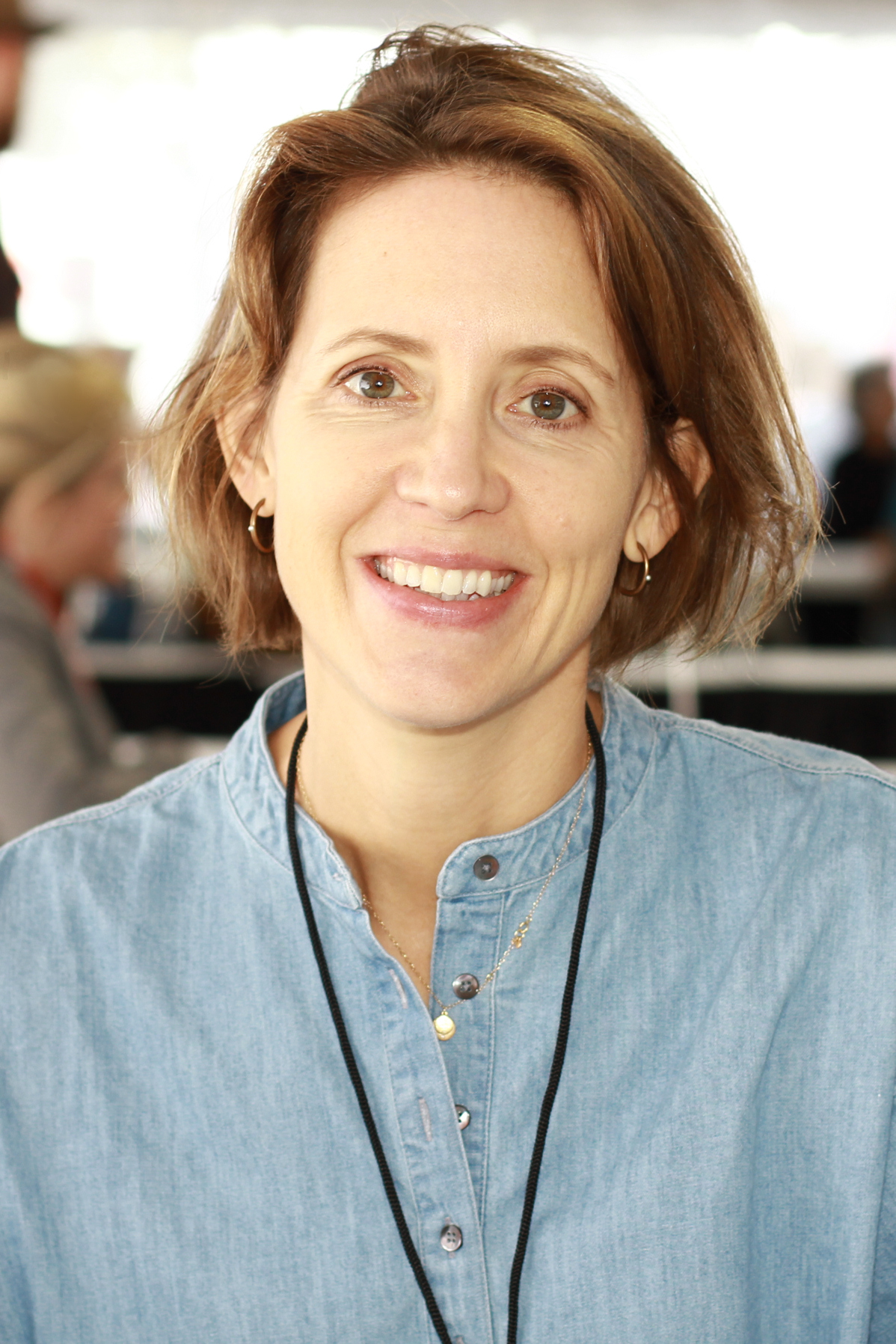
- Olsson at the 2019 Texas Book Festival
- Born: December 1972 (age 53)
- Education: Harvard College (BA)
- Occupation: Author
- Website: www.karenolsson.com

Karen Olsson (born December 1972) is an American novelist and nonfiction writer.

Her most recent novel, Dear Thorns (Astra House 2026) follows an ocelot biologist in South Texas as she fights to keep doing the work she loves and stumbles romantically. Kirkus Reviews called it "a deft, persuasive depiction of an appealing mind in midlife."

Olsson's first novel, Waterloo (FSG 2005), is set in a thinly veiled version of Austin, Texas. The book follows a down-on-his-motivation reporter at an alternative weekly paper as he tries to get over a failed relationship and investigate some irregular goings-on at the state capitol. Writing in The New York Times Book Review, Mark Costello described Waterloo as "a melancholy comedy of Texas politics [written] with great wit and assurance."

Her second novel, All the Houses, was published by Farrar, Straus and Giroux in 2015. Set in Washington, D.C., it is narrated by the middle daughter of a family that has come undone in the wake of the Iran-contra scandal.

In 2019, Olsson published The Weil Conjectures, which combines a memoir of her college years with a biography of mathematician André Weil.

A former editor of The Texas Observer, Olsson is a contributing writer at Texas Monthly and has written for Slate.com and The New York Times Magazine. She lives in Austin with her family.
