= Karen Olson =

American philanthropist

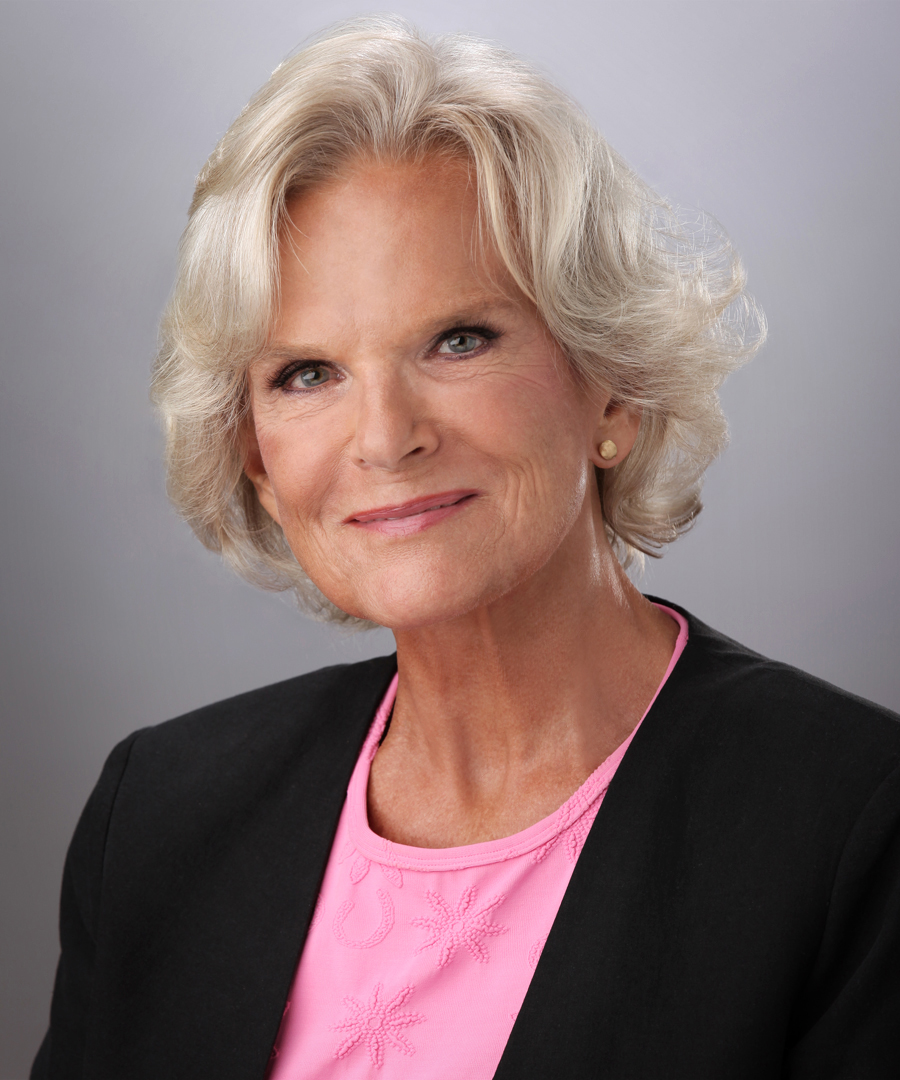
Karen Olson, Founder and President Emeritus of Family Promise

Karen Olson is an American philanthropist who is the founder, and president emeritus of Family Promise, a national nonprofit organization dedicated to helping homeless and low-income families.

== Early life ==
Olson was born in Darien, Connecticut. She attended public school in Darien and graduated from Lasell College in Auburndale, Massachusetts, where she studied Business Administration.

== Marketing career ==
After college, Olson spent seven years in marketing, the last three at Warner-Lambert in Morris Plains, New Jersey. She developed promotional campaigns for consumer products such as Schick razors, Listermint mouthwash, and Lubriderm lotion.

== Engaging the homeless ==
Rushing by Grand Central Station in Manhattan to a business meeting in 1982, Olson noticed a homeless woman she'd passed before. This time, she decided impulsively to buy a sandwich for the woman. When she gave it to her, the woman began a conversation. According to Olsen, "I learned a little bit about her life, and a barrier was sort of broken,” she said. ”Up until that point, I had thought you just don’t go near homeless people."

Olson and her two young sons began frequent trips to New York to hand out sandwiches to the homeless. "For a couple of years", Olson said, "every other Sunday, we would go in armed with sandwiches and got to know (homeless) people by name".

== National Interfaith Hospitality Network/Family Promise ==
When Olson learned there were hundreds of homeless people, including families, in her home community of Union County, New Jersey, she turned to the religious community for help. Within ten months, eleven area congregations were providing hospitality space within their buildings. The local YMCA was providing showers and a day center for families. A car dealer discounted a van for the organization to purchase. On October 27, 1986, the first Interfaith Hospitality Network opened its doors. As word spread, ten more congregations formed a second Network. Programs for transitional housing, childcare, and financial literacy followed.

Olson began an initiative to persuade religious communities across the country to provide homeless families with shelter, meals and help. The success of the first Networks led other congregations to seek help in developing similar programs. In 1988 it became a national nonprofit organization, the National Interfaith Hospitality Network. In 2003, its name changed to Family Promise.

Olson retired from leadership of Family Promise in January 2016, remaining as president emeritus. She continued to meet with affiliate leadership nationally and volunteers locally with the Union County program. She also gives talks about homelessness, poverty, and affordable housing at Family Promise locations, universities, schools, corporations, and businesses. Olson is currently writing a book about Family Promise, volunteerism, and homelessness. She has spoken at the Clinton School of Public Service, at the University of Arkansas on Mobilizing Communities to End Homelessness and the University of Kansas. According to Olson, "It's up to each one of us to develop a public will to make a difference and to solve this tragedy of homelessness."

== Awards, works and recognitions ==
Olson received the 1992 Annual Points of Light Award from President George H. W. Bush, the New Jersey Governor's Pride Award in Social Services, and the Jefferson Award from the American Institute for Public Service. She has been profiled by CBS News, published in The Huffington Post, and she is featured in the book Courage is Contagious: Ordinary People Doing Extraordinary Things to Change the Face of America, written in 1999 by Ohio Congressman John Kasich.

Olson served on the Family Homelessness Task Force of the United States Interagency Council on Homelessness and the New Jersey Interagency Council on Homelessness.

== Works ==
- “Poverty and Homelessness in the United States,” an essay from Just Preaching (Andre Resner Ed. for Family Promise, Chalice Press 2003)
