= List of fictional bisexual characters =

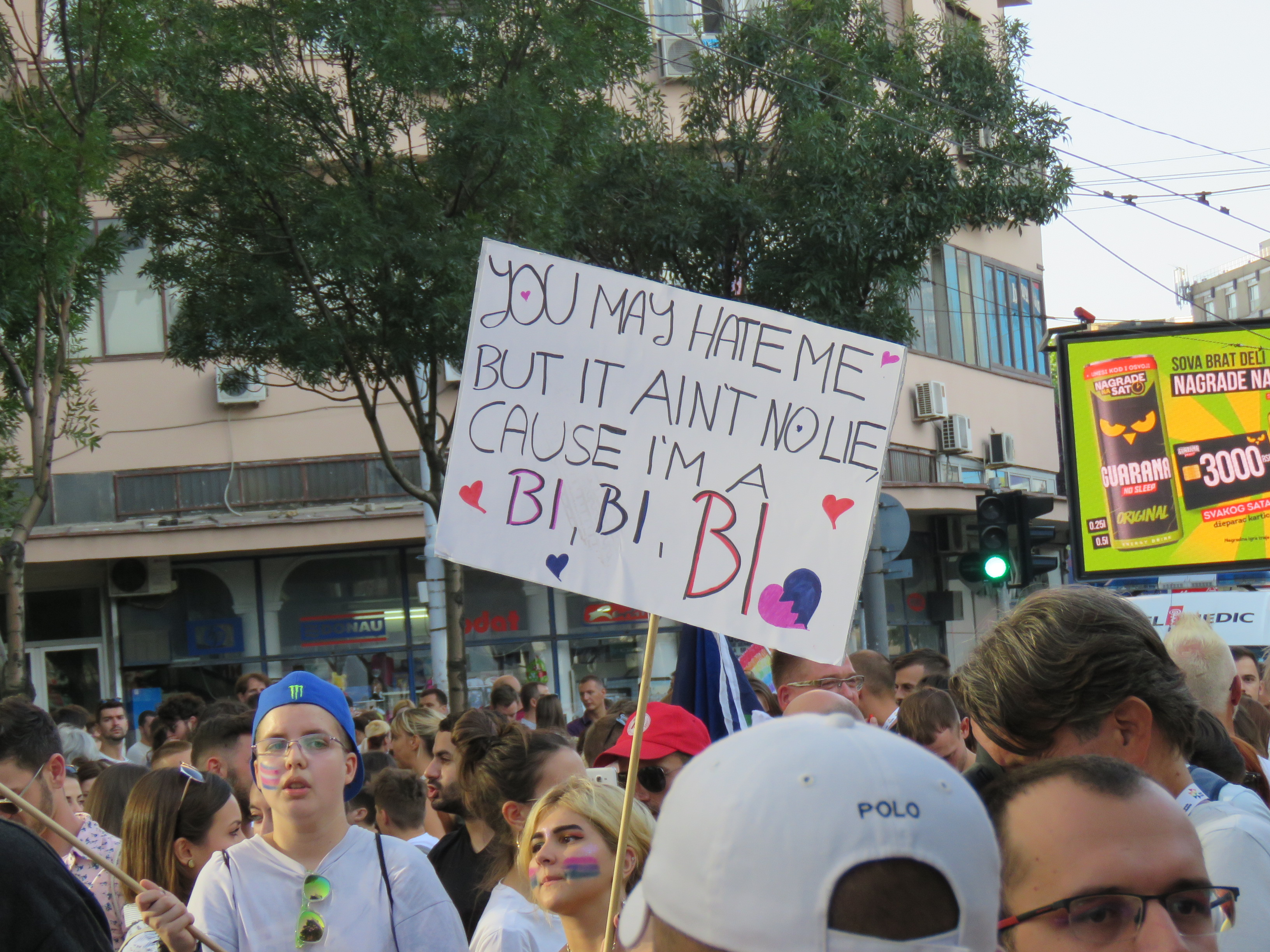
Belgrade Pride parade 2019

This is a list of fictional bisexual characters, i.e. characters that either self-identify as bisexual or have been identified by outside parties to be bisexual. Bisexuality is a sexual orientation that refers to the romantic or sexual attraction towards people of more than one gender. Listed characters are either recurring characters, cameos, guest stars, or one-off characters.

For fictional characters in other identifications of the LGBTQ community, see the lists of lesbian, gay, transgender, non-binary, pansexual, asexual, and intersex characters.

The names are in alphabetical order by surname, or by single name if the character does not have a surname. If more than two characters are in one entry, the last name of the first character is used.

== Graphic novels ==
Characters	Title	Years	Notes	Country
John Constantine	DC Comics	1985–present	Since 1992, Constantine has been consistently depicted as having romantic history with both men and women.	United States
Robin (Tim Drake)	Batman	1989-present	Tim Drake comes out as bisexual when he realizes he has romantic feelings for his male friend Bernard Dowd.	United States
Ramona Flowers	Scott Pilgrim	2004–2010	Ramona has seven evil exes: six ex-boyfriends and her ex-girlfriend Roxie. Scott Pilgrim, Ramona's current boyfriend in the series, often makes the mistake of referring to them as seven "ex-boyfriends" before learning that Ramona used to date a girl. Ramona repeatedly corrects him by pointing out that "exes" is correct, not "ex-boyfriends", but she does not actually tell him about her ex-girlfriend until Scott meets Roxie in person. Ramona says that dating a girl was just a phase. However, Ramona later spends the night at Roxie's house and they make out offscreen.	Canada
Black Cat (Felicia Hardy)	The Amazing Spider-Man	1979-present	Felicia Hardy is a bisexual cat burglar.	United States
Jericho (Joseph Wilson)	DC Comics	1984–present	Marv Wolfman and George Pérez, who created Jericho, originally intended for him to be gay. However, they decided to make Jericho heterosexual instead, reasoning that it would be problematic to have him depicted as both effeminate and gay. Jericho was revealed to be bisexual following the DC Rebirth relaunch.	United States
Jon Kent	DC Comics	2015–present	Jon has a male love interest and is canonically bisexual.	United States
Jay Nakamura	DC Comics	2021–present	Jay Nakamura was introduced in the 2021 series Superman: Son of Kal-El as a reporter who Jon Kent enters a relationship with while helping him overthrow the government of Gamorra.	United States
Korra	The Legend of Korra: Turf Wars & The Legend of Korra: Ruins of the Empire	2017–2018 & 2018–2020	In the animated series The Legend of Korra, Korra and Asami date Mako at different points. At the end of the series, Korra and Asami are holding hands and looking into each other's eyes while traveling through a portal right before the ending credits. The creators later confirmed the intention of the ending scene was to show Asami and Korra becoming a romantic couple. In the graphic novel The Legend of Korra: Turf Wars, set after the events of the series, Korra and Asami are in a relationship.	United States
Asami Sato	The Legend of Korra: Turf Wars & The Legend of Korra: Ruins of the Empire	2017–2018 & 2018–2020	In the animated series The Legend of Korra, Korra and Asami date Mako at different points. At the end of the series, Korra and Asami are holding hands and looking into each other's eyes while traveling through a portal right before the ending credits. The creators later confirmed the intention of the ending scene was to show Asami and Korra becoming a romantic couple. In the graphic novel The Legend of Korra: Turf Wars, set after the events of the series, Korra and Asami are in a relationship.	United States
Selina Kyle (Catwoman)	Batman	1940-present	Selina Kyle is Batman’s love interest, and she has flirted with male and female characters. In Catwoman: Hunted, she explicitly shows attraction to Kate Kane.	United States
Dee Laytner	Fake & Fake 2 & Fake 3	1994–2000 & 2007 & 2010-2011	Dee, a police detective, repeatedly tells Randy "Ryo" Maclean, a New York City rookie cop, he is bisexual, while Ryo and Dee enter a relationship throughout the course of this manga.	
Ash Lynx	Banana Fish	1985–1994	Ash has slept with men and women during his time as a prostitute. He mainly has relationships with men such as Eiji, while dealing with childhood trauma from molestation. While has a close relationship with Eiji, he admitted that he had a relationship with a girl who was killed "under suspicion of being his girlfriend."	Japan
Nico Minoru	Runaways	2003-present	Nico is a bisexual teenaged witch with a female love interest (Karolina Dean).	United States
Wonder Woman	DC Comics Bombshells & Bombshells United	2015–2017 & 2017-2018	Wonder Woman was in a relationship with Mera and later Steve Trevor. Harley and Poison Ivy are in a relationship in the series.	United States
Harley Quinn	DC Comics Bombshells & Bombshells United	2015–2017 & 2017-2018	Wonder Woman was in a relationship with Mera and later Steve Trevor. Harley and Poison Ivy are in a relationship in the series.	United States
Poison Ivy	DC Comics Bombshells & Bombshells United	2015–2017 & 2017-2018	Wonder Woman was in a relationship with Mera and later Steve Trevor. Harley and Poison Ivy are in a relationship in the series.	United States
Mera	DC Comics Bombshells & Bombshells United	2015–2017 & 2017-2018	Wonder Woman was in a relationship with Mera and later Steve Trevor. Harley and Poison Ivy are in a relationship in the series.	

== Literature ==
Character	Work	Author	Years	Description
Akhenaten	A God Against the Gods & Return to Thebes	Allen Drury	1976 1977	Ancient Egyptian Pharaoh Akhenaten is married to Nefertiti, but his romance with his brother Smenkhkara contributes to his downfall.
Smenkhkara	A God Against the Gods & Return to Thebes	Allen Drury	1976 1977	Ancient Egyptian Pharaoh Akhenaten is married to Nefertiti, but his romance with his brother Smenkhkara contributes to his downfall.
Alexander the Great	Fire from Heaven & The Persian Boy	Mary Renault	1969 1972	Alexander is involved in a romantic sexual relationship with Hephaistion, and then the Persian slave Bagoas, but is also married three times and fathers a son. Both men are involved in romantic sexual relationships with Alexander the Great.
Bagoas	Fire from Heaven & The Persian Boy	Mary Renault	1969 1972	Alexander is involved in a romantic sexual relationship with Hephaistion, and then the Persian slave Bagoas, but is also married three times and fathers a son. Both men are involved in romantic sexual relationships with Alexander the Great.
Hephaistion	Fire from Heaven & The Persian Boy	Mary Renault	1969 1972	Alexander is involved in a romantic sexual relationship with Hephaistion, and then the Persian slave Bagoas, but is also married three times and fathers a son. Both men are involved in romantic sexual relationships with Alexander the Great.
Brigham Anderson	Advise and Consent	Allen Drury	1959	Married US senator Anderson is blackmailed over a secret wartime homosexual affair for which he is unapologetic.
Magnus Bane	The Shadowhunter Chronicles	Cassandra Clare	2007–	Magnus is openly bisexual, having several relationships with both men and women, his most notable partners being his current boyfriend Alec Lightwood and his ex-girlfriend Camille Belcourt.
Chuck Bass	Gossip Girl	Cecily von Ziegesar	2002–2011	In this series, Chuck was bisexual, although this was never explored in the Gossip Girl TV show, which creator Joshua Safran said he regretted.
Claudine	Claudine at School	Colette	1902	Claudine is unfaithful to her husband, Renaud, having an affair with her friend Rézi, who herself has a secrete liaison with Renaud.
Rézi	Claudine at School	Colette	1902	Claudine is unfaithful to her husband, Renaud, having an affair with her friend Rézi, who herself has a secrete liaison with Renaud.
Clayton "Clay"	Less than Zero	Bret Easton Ellis	1985	This is coming-of-age story narrated by Clay, "a sexually ambiguous eighteen-year-old student", who tries to resume a relationship with the woman he loved in high school but "leaves a party with a young man."
Clayton "Clay"	Imperial Bedrooms	Bret Easton Ellis	2010	This is coming-of-age story narrated by Clay, "a sexually ambiguous eighteen-year-old student", who tries to resume a relationship with the woman he loved in high school but "leaves a party with a young man."
Fever Crumb	Fever Crumb Series	Philip Reeve	2009–11	Fever first falls in love with the male Arlo Thursday, and later with the female Cluny Morvish.
Beauchamp Day	Tales of the City series	Armistead Maupin	1978–2014	While the original series featured gay and bisexual characters who "kissed on camera and had sex in bathhouses," in the Netflix adaption of this series, Shawna is an "explicitly bisexual character."
DeDe Halcyon Day	Tales of the City series	Armistead Maupin	1978–2014	While the original series featured gay and bisexual characters who "kissed on camera and had sex in bathhouses," in the Netflix adaption of this series, Shawna is an "explicitly bisexual character."
Mona Ramsey	Tales of the City series	Armistead Maupin	1978–2014	While the original series featured gay and bisexual characters who "kissed on camera and had sex in bathhouses," in the Netflix adaption of this series, Shawna is an "explicitly bisexual character."
Paul Denton	The Rules of Attraction	Bret Easton Ellis	1987	In this book, set in Camden, Paul lusted for another character, Sean Bateman, saying he slept with him, while Bateman "never admits as much." This book ended up fortifying Ellis's reputation as a "nihilistic authorial presence who reports action but seldom comments on it."
Courtney Farrell	Chocolates for Breakfast	Pamela Moore	1956	Courtney develops a crush on her female boarding school teacher, and later has a sexual relationship with Barry Cabot, her mother's bisexual friend who is in a relationship with a man.
Barry Cabot	Chocolates for Breakfast	Pamela Moore	1956	Courtney develops a crush on her female boarding school teacher, and later has a sexual relationship with Barry Cabot, her mother's bisexual friend who is in a relationship with a man.
Darvish Shayrif Hakem	The Fire's Stone	Tanya Huff	1990	Darvish is willing to have sex with anyone, whether men or women.
Rosemary Harper	The Long Way to a Small, Angry Planet	Becky Chambers	2015	Rosemary Harper and Sissix are both either lesbians or bisexual as the two women enter a relationship with each other over the course of the novel.
Sissix	The Long Way to a Small, Angry Planet	Becky Chambers	2015	Rosemary Harper and Sissix are both either lesbians or bisexual as the two women enter a relationship with each other over the course of the novel.
Herewiss	The Tale of the Five series	Diane Duane	1979–1992	This book is a fantasy with a "bisexual male protagonist whose main love interest is male," and is set in a world with normalized polyamory, with bisexuality and polyamory seeming to "be the default."
Freelorn	The Tale of the Five series	Diane Duane	1979–1992	This book is a fantasy with a "bisexual male protagonist whose main love interest is male," and is set in a world with normalized polyamory, with bisexuality and polyamory seeming to "be the default."
The Goddess	The Tale of the Five series	Diane Duane	1979–1992	This book is a fantasy with a "bisexual male protagonist whose main love interest is male," and is set in a world with normalized polyamory, with bisexuality and polyamory seeming to "be the default."
Ruth Jamison	Fried Green Tomatoes at the Whistle Stop Cafe	Fannie Flagg	1987	This novel weaves together the past and the present through the blossoming friendship between Evelyn Couch, a middle-aged housewife, and Ninny Threadgoode, an elderly woman who lives in a nursing home, while her sister-in-law, Idgie, and her friend, Ruth, ran a café. Ruth is married to a man and bears his child but subsequently has a long-term romantic relationship with another woman. Although it is not explicitly labeled as a lesbian relationship, every resident both knows about and accepts Idgie and Ruth's relationship, making lesbianism a theme in the novel while in the film adaptation, a story of Southern female friendship and love, Ruth had been in love with Buddy Threadgoode, Idgie's brother.
Denise Lambert	The Corrections	Jonathan Franzen	2001	In this novel, Denise begins affairs with both her boss and his wife, and though the restaurant is successful, she is fired when this is discovered.
Lestat de Lioncourt	The Vampire Chronicles	Anne Rice	1976–2014	Lestat, Armand, and most of Rice's male vampires have intense sexual and emotional attractions and relationships with both sexes.
Louis de Pointe du Lac	The Vampire Chronicles	Anne Rice	1976–2014	Lestat, Armand, and most of Rice's male vampires have intense sexual and emotional attractions and relationships with both sexes.
Armand	The Vampire Chronicles	Anne Rice	1976–2014	Lestat, Armand, and most of Rice's male vampires have intense sexual and emotional attractions and relationships with both sexes.
Marius de Romanus	The Vampire Chronicles	Anne Rice	1976–2014	Lestat, Armand, and most of Rice's male vampires have intense sexual and emotional attractions and relationships with both sexes.
David Talbot	The Vampire Chronicles	Anne Rice	1976–2014	Lestat, Armand, and most of Rice's male vampires have intense sexual and emotional attractions and relationships with both sexes.
Rhy Maresh	Shades of Magic trilogy	V. E. Schwab	2015–2017	Rhy is bisexual while Alucard is gay. They had a fling three years prior to the events of the books. Victoria Schwab actually stated multiple times in her eyes none of the characters are straight, but that is not mentioned in the series.
Alucard Emery	Shades of Magic trilogy	V. E. Schwab	2015–2017	Rhy is bisexual while Alucard is gay. They had a fling three years prior to the events of the books. Victoria Schwab actually stated multiple times in her eyes none of the characters are straight, but that is not mentioned in the series.
April May	An Absolutely Remarkable Thing	Hank Green	2018	May's bisexuality plays a key role throughout the series–she has an on-and-off relationship with Maya throughout the series, as well as a crush on Robin and a one-night stand with Miranda in An Absolutely Remarkable Thing. Her bisexuality is used against her in a televised debate with rival Peter Petrawicki, because May had publicized the idea that she was lesbian.
April May	A Beautifully Foolish Endeavor	Hank Green	2018	May's bisexuality plays a key role throughout the series–she has an on-and-off relationship with Maya throughout the series, as well as a crush on Robin and a one-night stand with Miranda in An Absolutely Remarkable Thing. Her bisexuality is used against her in a televised debate with rival Peter Petrawicki, because May had publicized the idea that she was lesbian.
Alice Meadows	A Village Affair	Joanna Trollope	1989	In this story, Alice Meadows questions her identity, having an affair with a lesbian woman named Clodagh Unwin, while she remains married, with her awakening depending on "a heart-wrenching choice between her lover and her family."
Henry "Monty" Montague	The Gentleman's Guide to Vice and Virtue	Mackenzi Lee	2017	Henry Montague is bisexual and has romantic feelings towards Percy, while his sister Felicity is asexual.
Felicity Montague	The Gentleman's Guide to Vice and Virtue	Mackenzi Lee	2017	Henry Montague is bisexual and has romantic feelings towards Percy, while his sister Felicity is asexual.
Percy	The Gentleman's Guide to Vice and Virtue	Mackenzi Lee	2017	Henry Montague is bisexual and has romantic feelings towards Percy, while his sister Felicity is asexual.
Hélène Noris	The Illusionist (Le rempart des Béguines)	Françoise Mallet-Joris	1951	Tamara has a romantic relationship with both Hélène and her father; Hélène prefers men after the fair ends.
Tamara Soulerr	The Illusionist (Le rempart des Béguines)	Françoise Mallet-Joris	1951	Tamara has a romantic relationship with both Hélène and her father; Hélène prefers men after the fair ends.
Adam Parrish	The Raven Cycle	Maggie Stiefvater	2012–2016	Adam shows romantic interest in Blue during the first two books, but then develops a relationship with Ronan Lynch.
Adam Parrish	The Dreamer Trilogy	Maggie Stiefvater	2019-	Adam shows romantic interest in Blue during the first two books, but then develops a relationship with Ronan Lynch.
Patroclus	The Song of Achilles	Madeline Miller	2011	Patroclus is bisexual, saying he would fall in love with Briseis if not for Achilles.
Yrica Quell	Star Wars: Alphabet Squadron	Alexander Freed	2019–2021	Yrica is a former Imperial pilot who defected to the New Republic and became an X-wing fighter pilot. She has formerly been in relationships with people of all genders.
Rae Sloane	Star Wars: A New Dawn & Star Wars: Aftermath	John Jackson Miller / Chuck Wendig	2014–2020	Rae is a high-ranking female Imperial officer and one of the first leaders of the First Order. In Star Wars Aftermath: Empire Ends it is mentioned that she had relationships with both men and women.
Patty Suso	Simon vs. the Homo Sapiens Agenda	Becky Albertalli	2015	Abby's cousin Cassie Peskin-Suso, a principal character in the sequel novel The Upside of Unrequited, is a lesbian and Mina is her pansexual girlfriend while Cassie also has two mothers Nadine, who is a lesbian, and Patty, who is bisexual.
René Suratt	University series	Allen Drury	1990–1998	René is protagonist Willie Wilson's nemesis, "a bisexual seducer of students."
Jack Twist	"Brokeback Mountain" (short story)	Annie Proulx	1997	Jack and Ennis have a long term sexual and romantic relationship despite both being married to women and fathering children. Jack also has sexual relationships with other men and a woman, while Ennis does not. Critics have described both men as gay or variably Jack as bisexual and Ennis as heterosexual.
Ennis Del Mar	"Brokeback Mountain" (short story)	Annie Proulx	1997	Jack and Ennis have a long term sexual and romantic relationship despite both being married to women and fathering children. Jack also has sexual relationships with other men and a woman, while Ennis does not. Critics have described both men as gay or variably Jack as bisexual and Ennis as heterosexual.
Raymond Tyler, Jr. & Basil	Invisible Life & Just As I Am & Abide With Me & Any Way the Wind Blows	E. Lynn Harris	1991 & 1995 & 1999 & 2001	Raymond is torn between his girlfriend Nicole and his married male lover. Basil leaves his fiancée Yancey at the altar and pursues a gay lifestyle.
Basil Henderson	Invisible Life & Just As I Am & Abide With Me & Any Way the Wind Blows	E. Lynn Harris	1991 & 1995 & 1999 & 2001	Raymond is torn between his girlfriend Nicole and his married male lover. Basil leaves his fiancée Yancey at the altar and pursues a gay lifestyle.
Villanelle	The Passion	Jeanette Winterson	1987	In this book, Villanelle is an androgynous and bisexual daughter of a boatman from Venice who crosses paths with Henri, who also has an "ambivalent sexuality."
Aral Vorkosigan	Vorkosigan Saga	Lois McMaster Bujold	1986–	Aral Vorkosigan has relationships with both men and women: with his first wife and Ges Vorrutyer pre-canon, and his second wife Cordelia and Oliver Jole during the books. In the book Mirror Dance, Cordelia says that she "judge[s] him to be bisexual, but subconsciously more attracted to men than to women."

|Odie Cliff |Odie Cliff, all books |Align+" center" | 2025- | Odie Cliff dates Dennis Darkwood, but he is Bi as he came out as bi to his mother.

== Theatre ==
Character	Title	Notes
King Bolloxinion & most other characters	Sodom, or the Quintessence of Debauchery (1684)	An obscene Restoration closet drama thought to be by John Wilmot, 2nd Earl of Rochester. Bolloxinion, King of Sodom, commands universal same-sex sodomy.
Claude, Berger, Woof, various	Hair	Various characters in this musical are bisexual.

== Video games ==
Characters	Series or Title	Years	Notes	Developer
Morrigan Aensland	Darkstalkers & Marvel vs. Capcom & Darkstalkers: The Night Warriors	1994	Morrigan is bisexual. She is a recurring character in the Darkstalkers and Marvel vs. Capcom fighting game series.	Capcom
Alexios and Kassandra	Assassin's Creed & Assassin's Creed Odyssey	2018	The player may choose to play as either Alexios or Kassandra, a pair of siblings. The game presents both opposite-sex and same-sex relationship options for the player character. They are potentially lesbian, gay, or bisexual.	Ubisoft Montreal
Ares	Langrisser Re:Incarnation Tensei	2015	In this Japanese tactical role-playing game, Ares is the player character. He can confess his feelings to the guys, along with the girls, to unlock different perks.	Masaya Games
Avatar & Sex workers	Ultima VII: The Black Gate & Ultima	1992	In the House of Baths at Buccaneer's Den, the player (the "Avatar") can pay for the services of male and female sex workers, regardless of the player's gender.	Origin Systems
Axton	Borderlands & Borderlands 2	2012	In the DLC Tiny Tina's Assault on Dragon Keep (2013), it is revealed Axton, one of the playable characters, is bisexual. While his flirtatious lines with male characters were originally a coding error, Gearbox Studios decided to confirm his bisexuality with overt references in the DLC.	Gearbox Software
Ayano Aishi	Yandere Simulator	2014–Present	In October 2024, YandereDev confirmed protagonist Ayano Aishi to be an asexual uniromantic/monoromantic, who "doesn't feel sexual attraction [and is] exclusively attracted [romantically] to one specific human being in all the world, regardless of that person's gender", be it the male Taro or the female Taeko.	YandereDev
Byleth, Edelgard, Dorothea, Mercedes, Linhardt, Jeritza, Rhea, Sothis, Yuri	Fire Emblem: Three Houses & Fire Emblem	2019	Edelgard, Jeritza, Dorothea, Yuri, Rhea, Sothis, Linhardt, and Mercedes can be romanced by the player character regardless of gender during certain routes.	Intelligent Systems, Koei Tecmo
Curtis Craig	Phantasmagoria 2: A Puzzle of Flesh	1996	In this interactive movie, point-and-click adventure, Curtis is the protagonist. He is a close friend with his co-worker, Trevor, who is gay. Curtis admits to his psychiatrist he has feelings for Trevor and might be bisexual, and the two almost kiss later in the game and is also shown as having relations with his girlfriend and a S&M domme.	Sierra On-Line
Daisuke	True Love	1995	At the end of the Japanese visual novel game, the player character—default name is Daisuke—may attempt to start a relationship with any of the ten available girls, or with his best friend Kazuhiko as the only gay option. Depending on the choices taken and interactions experienced throughout the game, each girl and Kazuhiko may or may not be available for a relationship.	Software House Parsley
Kerry Eurodyne	Cyberpunk 2077	2020	R. Talsorian Games, the creators of the tabletop the game is based on, have confirmed the character is bisexual via Twitter.	CD Projekt RED
Deirdre Hallam	Moonmist	1986	This interactive fiction was the first game to feature a queer character, with one of the plotlines being that an artist named Vivian was in a relationship with Diedre, still married to a man. However, over the course of the game, the appearances by Dierde decreased.	Infocom
James "Jimmy" Hopkins	Bully	2006	In this Canadian action-adventure game, Jimmy is able to kiss both boys and girls. In the Xbox 360 version, the player can unlock an achievement by kissing a boy twenty times.	Rockstar Vancouver
Claude C. Kenny & Rena Lanford & Ashton Anchors & Precis F. Neumann	Star Ocean: The Second Story	1998	In this Japanese action role-playing game, the player can choose to play as either Claude or Rena. They can have a friendship and romance level with each party member acquired. Ashton (a male party member) and Precis (a female party member) can go on a date with them, regardless of their gender.	tri-Ace & Tose (PSP)
Korra	The Legend of Korra: A New Era Begins & The Legend of Korra (video game)	2014	These video games are based on the animated television series The Legend of Korra. Though her sexuality is not referenced in the games, the protagonist, Korra, is bisexual.	PlatinumGames & Webfoot Technologies
A Mage	Ultima VII Part Two: Serpent Isle & Ultima	1993	A mage sexually proposes the player's character regardless of the character's gender. The player is given the choice to accept or decline.	Origin Systems
Last Spirit Monk & Sky & Silk Fox & Dawn Star	Jade Empire	2005	In this Canadian action-adventure game, the Last Spirit Monk is the player character. The player can choose to play as either male or female. The player, regardless of their gender, can romance Sky (a male character) and Silk Fox (a female character). Only a male player can romance the female Dawn Star, but she can end up in a relationship with Silk Fox.	BioWare
Player character & Jeanette Voerman	Vampire: The Masquerade – Bloodlines	2004	In this action role-playing game, the player can have sex with female prostitutes or Jeanette as either a man or a woman. The female player character is able to have implied offscreen sexual relations with Jeanette, another female character.	Troika Games
Sole Survivor	Fallout 4 & Fallout	2015	The player character, "Sole Survivor", can romance their companions, regardless of their sex.	Bethesda Game Studios
Hana Tsu-Vachel	Fear Effect 2: Retro Helix	2001	The player character Hana Tsu-Vachel, in this action-adventure game, is bisexual and in a relationship with her hacker, Rain Qin, a lesbian character. The game's advertising heavily emphasized their relationship.	Kronos Digital Entertainment
Violet	Violet	2008	In this interactive fiction, the player is either a man or woman and Violet is their girlfriend. The player is freely able to change their gender and sex mid-game, which mostly only results in a few cosmetic changes in the dialogue. Violet serves as the game's narrator, but in fact, the player character is only imagining how she would narrate. Upon gender-changing, Violet may react by saying, "I adore you either way."	Jeremy Freese
Julliane "Jill" Stingray	VA-11 Hall-A	2016	Although the lore focuses on the relationship with her ex-girlfriend Lenore, Jill frequently expresses her attraction towards both men and women, stating her preferences in men during a conversation with Alma and Dana; It's even implied thorough the gameplay that he dated a man named "Bill".	Sukeban Games

== Webcomics ==
Characters	Name of comic	Years	Notes
Bruno	Bruno	1996–2007	In this comic by Christopher Baldwin, the titular character, Bruno, is a "bisexual, philosophical, free-spirited woman" and becomes involved with Sophia, who "has male and female lovers within the bounds of a polyamorous relationship." The webcomic also features a trans woman named Judi, with Baldwin offering "brief flashes inside Judi's private sexual life," even though most of the main characters don't know she is trans. Apart from this, in one comic, Bruno admits her bisexuality, and in others, she goes on a date with Frank, has a one-night-stand with Patricia, and sleeps with her friend Donna. In the latter case, Bruno and Donna have a passionate relationship, but due to Bruno's alcoholism and somewhat turbulent personality, they break up. After the breakup, Bruno expresses interest in a boy but is also seen to still be attracted to Donna.
Dorothy	Jane's World	1998–2018	In this Paige Braddock comic, Dorothy, Jane's best friend, is bisexual. She had crushes on both genders, although she doesn't like to admit it.
Fara Bryer-Valverde	Rain	2010 - 2022	Fara Bryer is a bisexual woman in the webcomic Rain. Ky(lie) Coven is genderfluid and bisexual, Randall Martin Guy is bisexual, and Shelby is bisexual and polyamorous.
Ky(lie) Coven	Rain	2010 - 2022	Fara Bryer is a bisexual woman in the webcomic Rain. Ky(lie) Coven is genderfluid and bisexual, Randall Martin Guy is bisexual, and Shelby is bisexual and polyamorous.
Randall Martin Guy (Randy)	Rain	2010 - 2022	Fara Bryer is a bisexual woman in the webcomic Rain. Ky(lie) Coven is genderfluid and bisexual, Randall Martin Guy is bisexual, and Shelby is bisexual and polyamorous.
Shelby	Rain	2010 - 2022	Fara Bryer is a bisexual woman in the webcomic Rain. Ky(lie) Coven is genderfluid and bisexual, Randall Martin Guy is bisexual, and Shelby is bisexual and polyamorous.
Jake English & Dave Strider & Most Trolls	Homestuck	2009–2016	This comic by Andrew Hussie includes multiple bisexual characters. The trolls, a prominent race in the comic, are shown to be mainly bisexual and reproduce bisexually. The human characters Dave Strider and Jake English are also shown to be attracted to both male and female characters. The story has been praised for creating "a wide range of relatable narratives for LGBTQ+ readers."
Suzi "Zii" Nielsen & Désirée "Didi" Chastel & Matt	Ménage à 3	2008-2019	Suzi "Zii" Nielsen and Désirée "Didi" Chastel are bisexual. In addition, Matt, Dillon's partner, is technically bisexual.
Various characters	Kate or Die	2012–present	This comic by Kate Leth covers issues including bisexuality and feminism. The latter is manifested in "short, witty dissertations on issues such as youth, feminism, tattoo etiquette and bisexuality."

== See also ==
- Bisexual politics
- Biphobia
- Bisexual erasure
- Lists of bisexual people
- Getting Bi: Voices of Bisexuals Around the World
- Portrait of a Marriage
- List of fictional polyamorous characters
- List of animated series with LGBTQ characters
- LGBTQ themes in Western animation
- LGBTQ themes in anime and manga
