= Publishers Weekly list of bestselling novels in the United States in the 1960s =

This is a list of bestselling novels in the United States in the 1960s, as determined by Publishers Weekly. The list features the most popular novels of each year from 1960 through 1969.

The standards set for inclusion in the lists – which, for example, led to the exclusion of the novels in the Harry Potter series from the lists for the 1990s and 2000s – are currently unknown.

== 1960 ==
1. Advise and Consent by Allen Drury
2. Hawaii by James A. Michener
3. The Leopard by Giuseppe Tomasi di Lampedusa
4. The Chapman Report by Irving Wallace
5. Ourselves to Know by John O'Hara
6. The Constant Image by Marcia Davenport
7. The Lovely Ambition by Mary Ellen Chase
8. The Listener by Taylor Caldwell
9. Trustee from the Toolroom by Nevil Shute
10. Sermons and Soda-Water by John O'Hara

== 1961 ==
1. The Agony and the Ecstasy by Irving Stone
2. Franny and Zooey by J. D. Salinger
3. To Kill a Mockingbird by Harper Lee
4. Mila 18 by Leon Uris
5. The Carpetbaggers by Harold Robbins
6. Tropic of Cancer by Henry Miller
7. Winnie Ille Pu by Alexander Lenard (Latin translation of Winnie the Pooh by A. A. Milne)
8. Daughter of Silence by Morris West
9. The Edge of Sadness by Edwin O'Connor
10. The Winter of Our Discontent by John Steinbeck

== 1962 ==
1. Ship of Fools by Katherine Anne Porter
2. Dearly Beloved by Anne Morrow Lindbergh
3. A Shade of Difference by Allen Drury
4. Youngblood Hawke by Herman Wouk
5. Franny and Zooey by J. D. Salinger
6. Fail-Safe by Eugene Burdick and Harvey Wheeler
7. Seven Days in May by Fletcher Knebel and Charles W. Bailey II
8. The Prize by Irving Wallace
9. The Agony and the Ecstasy by Irving Stone
10. The Reivers by William Faulkner

== 1963 ==
1. The Shoes of the Fisherman by Morris West
2. The Group by Mary McCarthy
3. Raise High the Roof Beam, Carpenters, and Seymour-An Introduction by J. D. Salinger
4. Caravans by James A. Michener
5. Elizabeth Appleton by John O'Hara
6. Grandmother and the Priests by Taylor Caldwell
7. City of Night by John Rechy
8. The Glass-Blowers by Daphne du Maurier
9. The Sand Pebbles by Richard McKenna
10. The Battle of the Villa Fiorita by Rumer Godden

== 1964 ==
1. The Spy Who Came in from the Cold by John le Carré
2. Candy by Terry Southern and Mason Hoffenberg
3. Herzog by Saul Bellow
4. Armageddon by Leon Uris
5. The Man by Irving Wallace
6. The Rector of Justin by Louis Auchincloss
7. The Martyred by Richard E. Kim
8. You Only Live Twice by Ian Fleming
9. This Rough Magic by Mary Stewart
10. Convention by Fletcher Knebel and Charles W. Bailey II

== 1965 ==
1. The Source by James A. Michener
2. Up the Down Staircase by Bel Kaufman
3. Herzog by Saul Bellow
4. The Looking Glass War by John le Carré
5. The Green Berets by Robin Moore
6. Those Who Love by Irving Stone
7. The Man with the Golden Gun by Ian Fleming
8. Hotel by Arthur Hailey
9. The Ambassador by Morris West
10. Don't Stop the Carnival by Herman Wouk

== 1966 ==
1. Valley of the Dolls by Jacqueline Susann
2. The Adventurers by Harold Robbins
3. The Secret of Santa Vittoria by Robert Crichton
4. Capable of Honor by Allen Drury
5. The Double Image by Helen MacInnes
6. The Fixer by Bernard Malamud
7. Tell No Man by Adela Rogers St. Johns
8. Tai-Pan by James Clavell
9. The Embezzler by Louis Auchincloss
10. All in the Family by Edwin O'Connor

== 1967 ==
1. The Arrangement by Elia Kazan
2. The Confessions of Nat Turner by William Styron
3. The Chosen by Chaim Potok (N.B. The source shows the Styron and Potok books tied for 2 and 3.)
4. Topaz by Leon Uris
5. Christy by Catherine Marshall
6. The Eighth Day by Thornton Wilder
7. Rosemary's Baby by Ira Levin
8. The Plot by Irving Wallace
9. The Gabriel Hounds by Mary Stewart
10. The Exhibitionist by Henry Sutton

== 1968 ==
1. Airport by Arthur Hailey
2. Couples by John Updike
3. The Salzburg Connection by Helen MacInnes
4. A Small Town in Germany by John le Carré
5. Testimony of Two Men by Taylor Caldwell
6. Preserve and Protect by Allen Drury
7. Myra Breckinridge by Gore Vidal
8. Vanished by Fletcher Knebel
9. Christy by Catherine Marshall
10. The Tower of Babel by Morris West

== 1969 ==
1. Portnoy's Complaint by Philip Roth
2. The Godfather by Mario Puzo
3. The Love Machine by Jacqueline Susann
4. The Inheritors by Harold Robbins
5. The Andromeda Strain by Michael Crichton
6. The Seven Minutes by Irving Wallace
7. Naked Came the Stranger by Penelope Ashe
8. The Promise by Chaim Potok
9. The Pretenders by Gwen Davis
10. The House on the Strand by Daphne du Maurier
