= Recessional (poem) =

1897 poem written by Rudyard Kipling

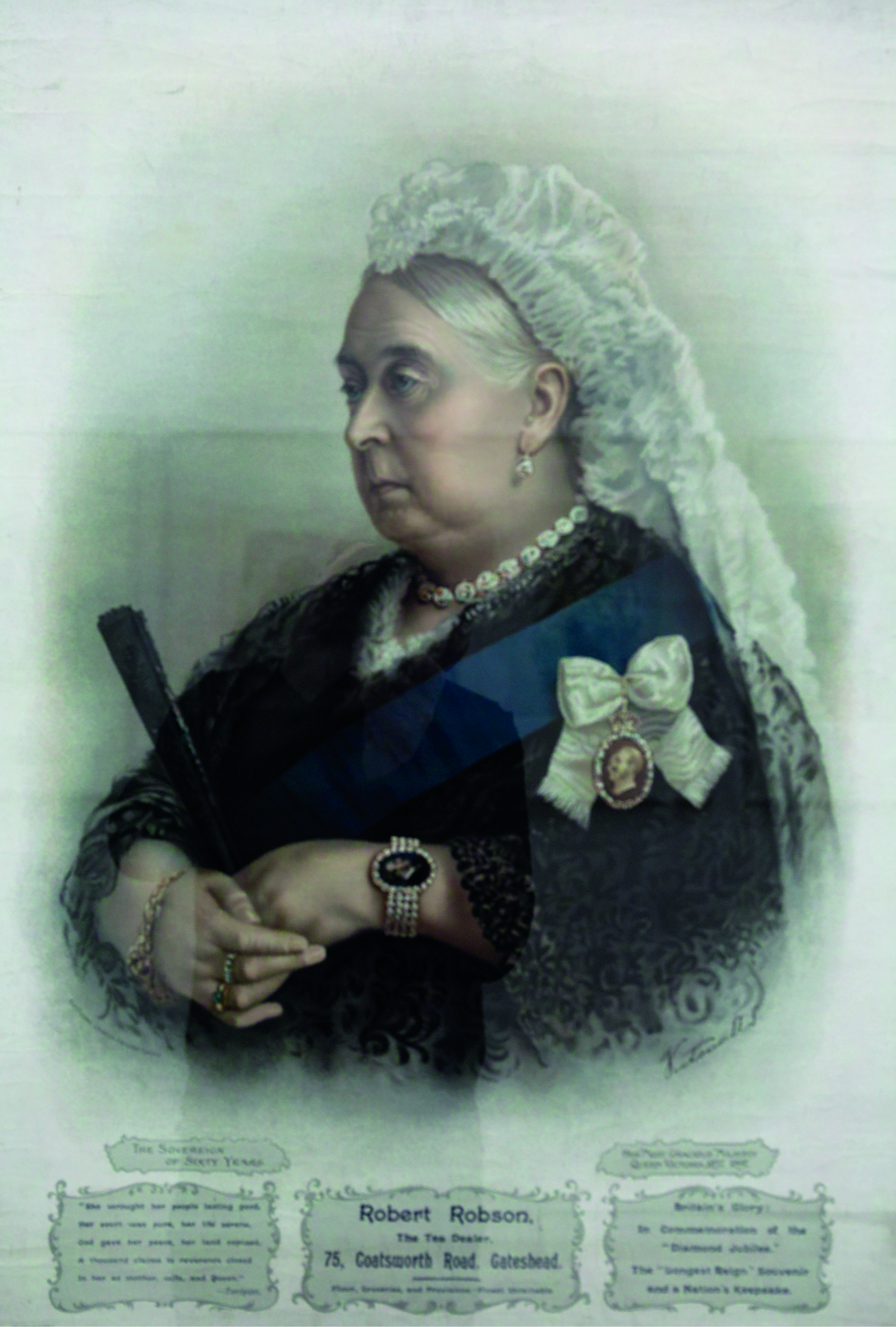
Queen Victoria in 1897

"Recessional" is a poem by Rudyard Kipling. It was composed for the Diamond Jubilee of Queen Victoria, in 1897.

== Description ==
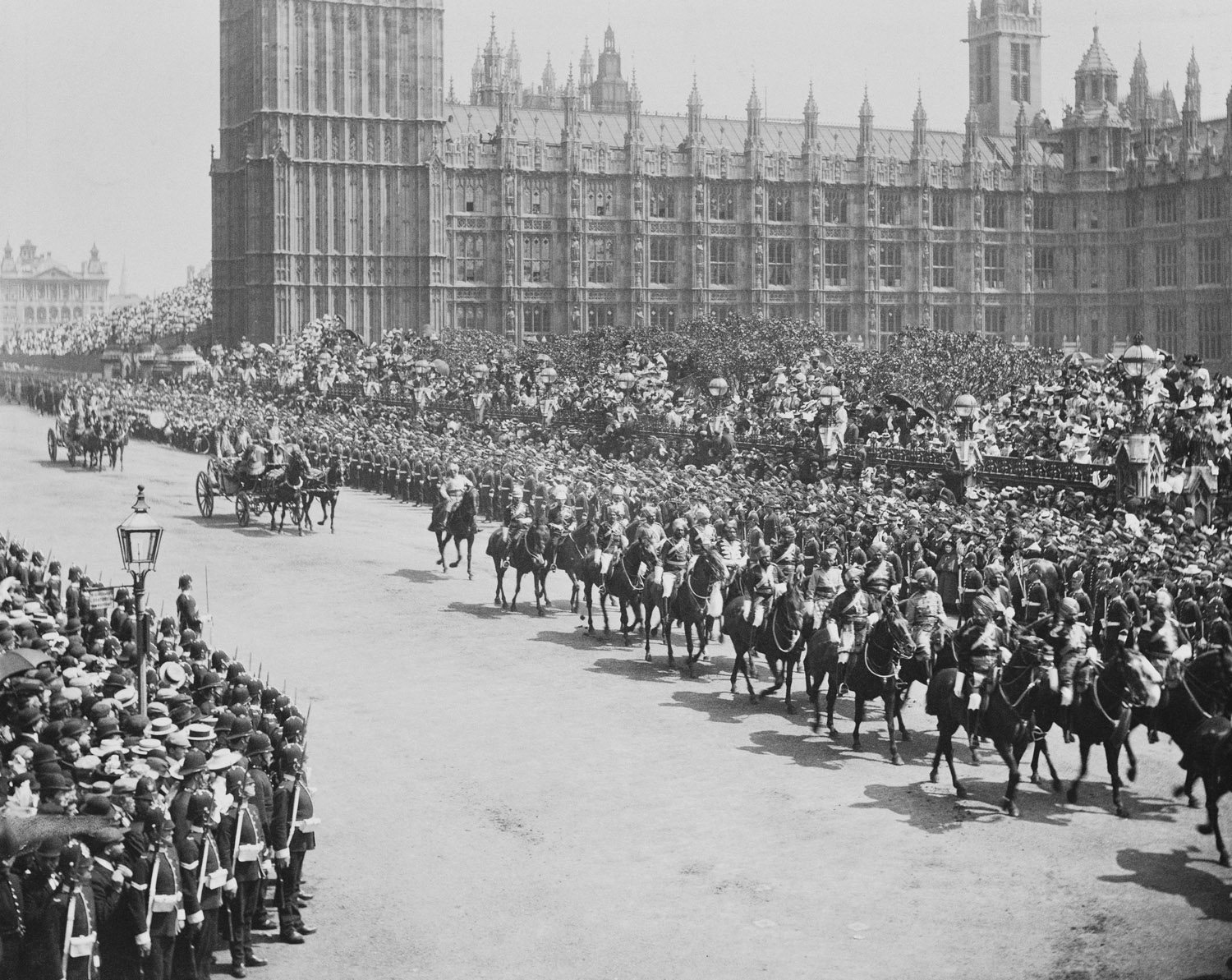
Indian Cavalry passing the Houses of Parliament, 22 June 1897

"Recessional" contains five stanzas of six lines each. As a recessional is a hymn or piece of music that is sung or played at the end of a religious service, in some respects the title dictates the form of the poem, which is that of a traditional English hymn.

Initially, Kipling had not intended to write a poem for the Jubilee. It was written and published only towards the close of the Jubilee celebrations, and represents a comment on them, an afterword. The poem was first published in The Times on July 17, 1897.

The poem went against the celebratory mood of the time, providing instead a reminder of the transient nature of British Imperial power. The poem expresses pride in the British Empire, but also an underlying sadness that the Empire must eventually go the way of all previous empires. "The title and its allusion to an end rather than a beginning add solemnity and gravitas to Kipling's message." In the poem, Kipling argues that boasting and jingoism, faults of which he was often accused, were inappropriate and vain in light of the permanence of God.

== Recessional ==
God of our fathers, known of old,
Lord of our far-flung battle line,
Beneath whose awful hand we hold
Dominion over palm and pine —
Lord God of Hosts, be with us yet,
Lest we forget—lest we forget!

The tumult and the shouting dies;
The Captains and the Kings depart:
Still stands Thine ancient sacrifice,
An humble and a contrite heart.
Lord God of Hosts, be with us yet,
Lest we forget—lest we forget!

Far-called, our navies melt away;
On dune and headland sinks the fire:
Lo, all our pomp of yesterday
Is one with Nineveh and Tyre!
Judge of the Nations, spare us yet,
Lest we forget—lest we forget!

If, drunk with sight of power, we loose
Wild tongues that have not Thee in awe,
Such boastings as the Gentiles use,
Or lesser breeds without the Law—
Lord God of Hosts, be with us yet,
Lest we forget—lest we forget!

For heathen heart that puts her trust
In reeking tube and iron shard,
All valiant dust that builds on dust,
And, guarding, calls not Thee to guard;
For frantic boast and foolish word—
Thy Mercy on Thy People, Lord!

== Biblical references ==
While not particularly religious himself, Kipling understood the value of sacred traditions and processions in English history. As a poet, he drew on the language of the Authorised Version of the Bible, familiar to most of his English-speaking readers, in order to reach a deeper level of response.

The phrase "lest we forget" forms the refrain of "Recessional". It is taken from Deuteronomy 6,12: "Then beware lest thou forget the Lord which brought thee forth out of the land of Egypt". The reference to the "ancient sacrifice" as a "humble and a contrite heart" is taken from the Miserere (Psalm 51).

== Publication ==
"Recessional" was reprinted in The Spectator on July 24, 1897. Kipling had composed "The White Man's Burden" for Victoria's jubilee, but replaced it with "Recessional". "Burden", which became better known, was published two years later, and was modified to fit the theme of American expansion after the Spanish–American War. Kipling included the poem in his 1903 collection The Five Nations.

At the close of the service to bury the Unknown Warrior in Westminster Abbey, "Recessional" was sung by the congregation as a hymn to the tune "Melita" ("Eternal Father, Strong to Save"). In Australia and New Zealand "Recessional" is sung as a hymn on Anzac Day. The Anglican Church of Canada adopted the poem as a hymn, as has the Church of Jesus Christ of Latter-day Saints in a 1985 hymnal.

Leslie Fish set the poem to music, along with several other Kipling poems, on her album "Our Fathers of Old".

T. S. Eliot included the poem in his 1941 collection A Choice of Kipling's Verse.

Pulitzer Prize-winning novelist Allen Drury titled the fifth book in his Advise and Consent series "Come Nineveh, Come Tyre," published in 1973.
