= A Thing of State =

1995 novel by Allen Drury

- US first edition
- Author: Allen Drury
- Language: English
- Genre: Political novel
- Publisher: Scribner
- Publication date: September 18, 1995
- Publication place: United States
- Media type: Print (hardcover & paperback)
- Pages: 384
- ISBN: 0-684-80702-5

A Thing of State is a 1995 political novel by Allen Drury which follows the U.S. State Department's response to a crisis in the Middle East. It is a standalone work set in a different fictional timeline from Drury's 1959 novel Advise and Consent, which earned him a Pulitzer Prize for Fiction.

A Thing of State was the last novel Drury saw published before his death in 1998; his final novel, Public Men, was published posthumously.

== Plot summary ==
It is 1999, and the Middle Eastern kingdoms of Greater and Lesser Lolome are at war with each other over oil. When Sidi bin Sidi bin Sidi, the despotic ruler of Greater Lolome newly armed with nuclear weapons, demands control over Lesser Lolome, the United States is compelled to intervene. The President hopes to use the situation to his political advantage, while the Secretary of State, his deputy, the United Nations and other factions debate their next move under pressure from the American public, which Sidi knows had tied their hands.

== Critical reception ==
Publishers Weekly called the novel's plot "a believable worst-case scenario about the consequences of our failure to bring the Gulf War to a satisfactory end", and noted that "despite an overly expository beginning and prose that occasionally resembles a jungle thicket, the narrative quickly gathers pace and sweeps readers along toward a chilling conclusion." Kirkus Reviews wrote:

The plot resonates with recent events in the Middle East and with America's loss of will and increased vulnerability to atomic blackmail, a valid topic for a political novel, but Drury's cardboard characters and continuous bombast make for hard going."
