= Pentagon (novel) =

1986 novel by Allen Drury

- US first edition
- Author: Allen Drury
- Language: English
- Genre: Political novel
- Publisher: Doubleday
- Publication date: September 17, 1986
- Publication place: United States
- Media type: Print (hardcover & paperback)
- Pages: 592
- ISBN: 0-385-15141-1

Pentagon is a 1986 political novel by Allen Drury which follows the American military bureaucracy as it reacts to a crisis with the Soviet Union. It is a standalone work set in a different fictional timeline from Drury's 1959 novel Advise and Consent, which earned him a Pulitzer Prize for Fiction.

The novel was published in the United Kingdom as The Destiny Makers in 1988.

== Plot summary ==
The Soviet Union invades and occupies a sparsely populated Pacific atoll and proceeds to kill the inhabitants and gradually construct a missile and submarine base. Diplomatic overtures by the United States accomplish nothing, and a military response to this Soviet threat seems necessary. Such plans, however, are frustrated by infighting within the Pentagon, Congress, and elsewhere in the government. When the novel ends, the U.S. has failed to respond and the Soviets have consolidated their hold on the atoll.

== Critical reception ==
The Destiny Makers (1988, UK)

Publishers Weekly called the idea behind the novel "promising" but then noted "the book's merit ends with that concept". The review went on to criticize it as a "bloated, wooden novel that lacks the simplest of narrative virtues" and added, "as the Pentagon's mishandling of this crisis reaches near-buffoonery, Drury's attempted critique of a bureaucracy burdened with political infighting, waste and mismanagement unintentionally becomes almost comic for those readers with the endurance to get that far."

Diane D. Henderson of The Washington Monthly called the novel "a big, sprawling work ... [that] never quite achieves coherence or focus". She writes:

Drury draws all the right conclusions about what's wrong with the DOD. There is very little forward thinking or strategic planning. The Soviets think aggressively, the chairman of the joint chiefs of staff remarks, while we think defensively. Military personnel and high level DOD civil servants serve, on average, only two or three years; by the time they've learned their jobs, it's time to move on. Interservice rivalries, conflicting civilian and military purposes, and ugly little human jealousies make a mockery of sincere efforts to get things done. The explanation for all this offered by one character, Helen Clark, the beautiful and smart assistant secretary of defense for acquisition and logistics, is on target: too much money and too many constituents to satisfy in the Pentagon, in the White House, and in industry.

The novel was released by Severn House Publishers in the United Kingdom as The Destiny Makers in August 1988.
