= That Summer =

That Summer may refer to:

== Literature ==
- That Summer (Drury novel), a 1965 novel by Allen Drury
- That Summer (Dessen novel), a 1996 novel by Sarah Dessen
- That Summer (Greig novel), a 2000 novel by Andrew Greig
- That Summer (picture book), a 2002 children's book written by Tony Johnston and illustrated by Barry Moser

== Music ==
- "That Summer" (song), a 1993 song by Garth Brooks

== Cinema ==
- That Summer!, a 1979 film starring Ray Winstone
- A Burning Hot Summer, a 2011 film directed by Philippe Garrel, pre-release title That Summer
- That Summer (2017 film), based on recovered footage filmed at Grey Gardens in 1972

== Television ==
- That Summer (TV series), a 2025 Thai television series
