= The Throne of Saturn (novel) =

1971 novel by Allen Drury

The Throne of Saturn: A Novel of Space and Politics
- First edition
- Author: Allen Drury
- Language: English
- Genre: Political/Science fiction novel
- Published: 1971 Doubleday
- Publication place: United States
- Media type: Print (hardback & paperback)
- Pages: 588 pages

The Throne of Saturn is a 1971 science fiction/political novel by Allen Drury that explores the preparations for a near-future crewed mission to the planet Mars.

== Background ==
The novel's title comes from a quatrain from the Rubaiyat of Omar Khayyam which appears as the book's epigraph. The book, one of Drury's longest and most complex, deals with a wide range of issues, including race, bureaucratic infighting, the role of the press, the effects of fame, and the way that Presidents behave. Drury speaks of his research into the space program in the foreword. The nature of the program, and the kinds of employees attracted to it, form the backbone of the story. Specifically political characters are important, but mainly shown in the way their actions affect the program. It was Drury's second novel to prominently feature a gay character after Advise and Consent. In this book, he deals with homophobia and unrequited love.

Drury, a staunch anti-Communist, believed most Americans were naive about the dangers of the Soviet-led communist threat to undermine the government of the United States. The Throne of Saturn depicts a renewed Space Race to reach Mars during which both Soviet and domestic enemies of the United States work to thwart, and possibly destroy, the American mission. Drury wrote the book in 1969 and 1970 while living in Maitland, Florida.

== Plot summary ==
In the late 1970s, an American spy satellite discovers Soviet preparations for a crewed mission to Mars, causing NASA to accelerate its existing plans for "Planetary Fleet One" (aka "Piffy One"), which is to be commanded by experienced astronaut Conrad "Connie" Trasker. NASA enrages many liberal opinion-makers and members of the media by naming a crew for the mission which does not include Dr. J. V. Halleck, the only black member of the astronaut corps, or Jazz Weickert, a longtime astronaut who is a darling of the news media but unpopular in the Astronaut Office. A protest at Kennedy Space Center organized by Clete O'Donnell, a labor leader who is secretly a Communist agent, results in an astronaut losing a leg to a bomb blast. Under intense political pressure, the U.S. president forces NASA to place Weickert and Halleck on the crew and invites the Soviets to participate in the mission.

Training begins with the new crew, somewhat hampered by Halleck's resentment toward the other astronauts, who he assumes have racist attitudes toward him. The fourth member of the crew, Dr. Pete Balkis, harbors romantic feelings for his close friend Trasker, who (though married) is attracted to Halleck's wife, Monetta. In Geneva, a U.S./Soviet conference on space cooperation collapses. Weickert suggests to his crewmates that their spacecraft should be armed in case of Soviet attack. Halleck leaks the fact that NASA is considering arming the mission to Percy Mercy, an influential magazine editor, forcing NASA to hold a press conference at which Halleck makes clear that he disagrees with his crewmates on the arming proposal. Andy Anderson, the NASA Administrator, decides to remove Halleck from the crew, but the President forces NASA to reinstate him and denies the request to arm the spacecraft. Halleck's ferocious reaction to his temporary removal causes Monetta to leave him and begin a brief affair with Trasker. Meanwhile, the spy satellite reveals that the Soviets have accelerated their launch preparations, causing the U.S. to move its own launch up by two months.

During the rollout of Planetary Fleet One's three Saturn Vs at Kennedy Space Center, five people with press badges attempt to destroy the rockets with guns and bombs, but are restrained by reporters and security. Shortly before the launch, the Soviets send a crewed spacecraft toward the Moon from their orbiting space station. A protest in the VIP viewing section on the day of the launch turns violent when a mob attacks the President and vice-president; they are unhurt, but Clete O'Donnell, leading the demonstration, is killed by his own bomb. Launching successfully, Planetary Fleet One heads to the Moon for a test phase prior to departure for Mars. Although the spacecraft is not armed, all four astronauts bring guns in their personal packs.

Shortly after Planetary Fleet One enters lunar orbit, the crew sights the Soviet spacecraft in orbit with them. With no proof that the Soviets' intentions are hostile, the President and NASA instruct the crew to continue their flight plan. While testing the Marsrover on the lunar surface, Trasker and Balkis lose power and communication with Houston and their crewmates in orbit. A Russian cosmonaut approaches them and extends his hand as though in friendship. Instinctively aware that the cosmonaut means Trasker harm, Balkis tackles him, and the cosmonaut slashes the leg of Balkis's spacesuit with a switchblade. Trasker kills the cosmonaut with a hatchet and disables the device cutting off their power, but Balkis's foot is caught in a crevasse between two rocks, and Trasker cannot free him. Telling Trasker he loves him, Balkis dies. Meanwhile, the Soviet ship in orbit is approaching Planetary Fleet One. Halleck, aware of Trasker's affair with his wife, tries to force Weickert at gunpoint to let him make the burn to take them out of orbit and leave Trasker to die. The two astronauts shoot each other; Halleck is killed, and Weickert ejects Halleck's body into space. Leaving Balkis's body on the surface, Trasker rejoins Weickert in orbit and rams the Soviet ship, sending it spinning into a fatal solar orbit. Trasker gets himself and the severely wounded Weickert back to the American space station in Earth's orbit.

Back on Earth, a congressional investigation into Planetary Fleet One begins. The President urges Trasker to downplay the Soviet role in the tragedy to avoid international tension, implying that he will be given command of the next Mars flight if he does so. Trasker and Weickert testify before the congressional commission, where hostile questioning by Senator Kenny Williams, an enemy of the space program, forces Trasker to reveal the truth so as not to lie under oath; only Halleck's role remains concealed. The President still offers Trasker command of Planetary Fleet Two, but Trasker refuses unless the mission can be armed. With the President about to offer another astronaut command, nearly the entire astronaut corps releases a statement that they will not participate in any further missions unless Trasker commands the mission and the spacecraft is armed. The President relents, and Planetary Fleet Two launches for Mars commanded by Trasker. The Soviet space program launches its own mission to Mars on the same day.

== Reception ==
While this book was a bestseller, it was panned by book reviewers. Kirkus Reviews commented that The Throne of Saturn was so heavy that "you may have to read it on the floor" and that Halleck "behaves like a total fruitcake throughout". The Victoria Advocate said that "Drury's political blinkers diminish what might have been the first authoritative novel of the space age." Copley News Service commented that "Drury has overwhelmingly documented and sometimes overdocumented the technical phases of Piffy One's training flight." A copy of The Throne of Saturn was on Richard Nixon's desk when he resigned the Presidency in 1974.

== See also ==
- Politics in fiction
