= Decision (novel) =

1983 novel by Allen Drury

- US first edition
- Author: Allen Drury
- Language: English
- Genre: Political novel
- Publisher: Doubleday
- Publication date: August 1983
- Publication place: United States
- Media type: Print (hardcover & paperback)
- Pages: 486
- ISBN: 0-385-18832-3

Decision is a 1983 political novel by Allen Drury which follows a newly appointed Supreme Court Justice as he is faced with the most difficult decision of his life. It is a standalone work set in a different fictional timeline from Drury's 1959 novel Advise and Consent, which earned him a Pulitzer Prize for Fiction.

The novel was out of print for several years until WordFire Press reissued it in paperback and e-book formats in 2014.

== Plot summary ==
Tay Barbour has just achieved his ultimate goal—a seat on the US Supreme Court—when his marriage crumbles and a terrorist bombing puts his daughter in a coma. The deterioration of the criminal justice system is illuminated as ambitious minds with their own agendas swirl around the terrorist's compelling case. And when it reaches the Supreme Court, Barbour faces the greatest challenge of his life: recuse himself and allow a probable deadlock, or take on the case and either follow his anti-death penalty principles or spurn them and seek justice for his daughter.

== Critical reception ==
Diane Rehm, on her nationally syndicated radio show, said that "Decision takes us inside the Supreme Court, as the human beings on that Court struggle with their personal biases and their public duties. At the center are characters who are real, ambitious, murderous, caring: all the stuff of Washington and political life."

The crime at the center of Decision takes place in South Carolina and is prosecuted according to the laws of that state. South Carolina trial attorney R. Howard Grubbs, writing in the American Bar Association Journal, wrote that Drury “entertains with verve and informs with skill and precision.” He praised the liberal outlook of Tay Barbour, and says that the writing shines in the conference where the Supreme Court discusses the case. “As the decision is made, Drury focuses on the human element and philosophy of each (justice), embellishing the text with dialogue that crackles with wit, accuracy, and compassion.” He said the conclusion of the book reinforced “the theme of the text—reconciliation of individual rights with the security of society—indelibly in the reader’s mind.” This appears to be the only review by a legal professional.

Kirkus Reviews summarized the novel as "the Supreme Court reduced to shrill, sometimes crudely effective melodrama", and noted:

...the oversimplifications are crass, often murky. Nor is the backstage-at-the Supreme-Court scene lively or convincing. Still, despite the stilted dialogue and stodgy pace here, there's a modicum of issue-interest and sentimental grab.
