= Preserve and Protect =

1968 novel by Allen Drury

- First edition cover
- Author: Allen Drury
- Language: English
- Series: Advise and Consent
- Genre: Political novel
- Publisher: Doubleday
- Publication date: June 1968
- Publication place: United States
- Media type: Print (Hardcover & Paperback)
- ISBN: 0-385-01030-3
- Preceded by: Capable of Honor
- Followed by: Come Nineveh, Come Tyre; The Promise of Joy

Preserve and Protect is a 1968 political novel written by Allen Drury. It is the third sequel to Advise and Consent, for which Drury was awarded the Pulitzer Prize for Fiction in 1960, and is followed by two alternate sequels of its own, Come Nineveh, Come Tyre (1973) and The Promise of Joy (1975).

== Plot ==
After winning his party's nomination in Capable of Honor, U.S. President Harley Hudson dies in a suspicious plane crash. William Abbott, the Speaker of the House, is reluctantly elevated to the presidency. The Majority Party immediately convenes its National Committee, torn between the supporters of California Governor Ted Jason and those of Secretary of State and former Illinois Senator Orrin Knox. Eventually Knox defeats Jason, but names Jason as his vice presidential nominee. At the conclusion of the novel, a gunman appears and opens fire on the two candidates and their wives.

== Publication ==
Published in June 1968, Preserve and Protect is the third sequel to Advise and Consent, for which Drury was awarded the Pulitzer Prize for Fiction in 1960. Advise and Consent and its sequels had been out of print for almost 15 years until WordFire Press reissued them in paperback and e-book format in 2014.

== Sequels ==
The cliffhanger ending of Preserve and Protect allowed Drury to offer two concurrent and conflicting sequels: one in which Knox dies and Jason goes on to become president, and the other with the opposite result. Both have as their background the Sino-Soviet split and its possible ramifications for the United States.

=== Come Nineveh, Come Tyre ===
1973's Come Nineveh, Come Tyre (ISBN 0-385-04392-9) finds presidential candidate Orrin Knox and vice presidential nominee Ted Jason's wife Ceil as the victims, and Jason is elected to the presidency. The Soviets immediately take advantage of the weak Jason, and are able to achieve dominance over the United States by the end, including the repression of civil liberties. It is implied Jason dies a suicide.

The title refers to lines in the 1897 poem Recessional by Rudyard Kipling which hints of civilizational impermanence:

Far-called, our navies melt away;

On dune and headland sinks the fire:

Lo, all our pomp of yesterday

Is one with Nineveh and Tyre!

These two cities are mentioned in the Bible: the Phoenician Tyre, whose King Hiram was the ally of King Solomon and helped build the Jerusalem Temple; and Nineveh, whose inhabitants repented of their evil ways after the Prophet Jonah warned them of God's intention to destroy their city.

The novel spent 26 weeks on The New York Times Best Seller list.

=== The Promise of Joy ===
In 1975's The Promise of Joy (ISBN 0-385-04396-1), Vice Presidential nominee Ted Jason and Beth Knox are the two killed, and Orrin Knox is elected as president. Knox continues to assist anti-Soviet rebels in Panama and the fictional oil-rich African nation of Gorotoland, despite mounting pressure by the international community and within the United States to retreat. Surprisingly, the Russians and Chinese begin a limited nuclear war with each other. After the war sparks revolutions within both countries, the new governments request that the United States broker a peace. Despite the new leadership, it is clear that neither side is really willing to make compromises, and the conflict soon re-emerges. This leads to increased conflict within the United States, as there is mounting pressure on the president to intervene on behalf of the Soviets. At the end of the novel, Knox advises the nation that the United States will intervene in the Sino-Soviet conflict, but does not specify how or on which side.

The title The Promise of Joy comes from a line by journalist and novelist Harold Begbie, quoted by a character in the book.
