= Capable of Honor =

1966 novel by Allen Drury

- First edition
- Author: Allen Drury
- Language: English
- Series: Advise and Consent
- Genre: Political novel
- Published: September 9, 1966
- Publisher: Doubleday
- Publication place: United States
- Media type: Print (Hardcover & Paperback)
- ISBN: 978-0-385-01028-3
- Preceded by: A Shade of Difference
- Followed by: Preserve and Protect

Capable of Honor is a 1966 political novel written by Allen Drury. It is the second sequel to Advise and Consent, for which Drury was awarded the Pulitzer Prize for Fiction in 1960.

Capable of Honor examines the role that journalists play during a US presidential campaign.

Advise and Consent and its sequels had been out of print for almost 15 years until WordFire Press reissued them in paperback and e-book format in 2014.

== Plot summary ==
In the novel, Harley Hudson, the affable but seemingly inept vice president from Advise and Consent, is now president and seeking a term of his own against a backdrop of Soviet-instigated war, as the Soviet Union backs rebel governments in Panama and in the fictitious oil-rich African republic of Gorotoland. Hudson responds with U.S. troops in both countries, and the conflicts soon bog down. The election season soon turns on these foreign policy questions, with the media and others seeking a peace candidate — and finding it in the popular but weak-willed Governor Ted Jason of California. Having announced his candidacy late, Hudson announces an open contest for the vice presidential nomination, in which Secretary of State Orrin Knox, who supports Hudson's policies, opposes Jason. The media, who had supported Jason heavily when it looked like it would be a Knox-Jason race for the presidential nomination, continues its effort for a Jason victory by any means they can.

At the convention in San Francisco, extreme elements of the Left and Right combine to support Jason, and there are several violent incidents, including one in which Knox's daughter-in-law is brutally attacked. When it becomes clear that the convention is split down the middle in fights over the platform, Jason challenges Hudson for the Majority Party's nomination (the novels never use the proper names "Republican" or "Democrat" but the descriptions of Majority Party corresponds strongly to the Democrats of the 1960s). The media, meantime, spins merrily away, filtering what the country is allowed to see and hear from San Francisco. Ceil Jason, the Governor's wife, leaves him when her husband's lack of principle and willingness to tolerate the violence sinks in to her. Hudson wins narrowly, and Jason expects the vice presidential nomination since he commands the support of almost half the convention. Hudson seems amenable, and places Jason on the dais as he makes his acceptance speech. Hudson humiliates Jason by making it clear that he considers Jason a panderer, and states he will accept Knox, and only Knox, as his running mate. The convention duly nominates Knox, but almost half its delegates walk out, to the pleasure of the media commentators, who predict a third-party convention from among the disaffected delegates.
