= Advise & Consent =

1962 US political drama film by Otto Preminger

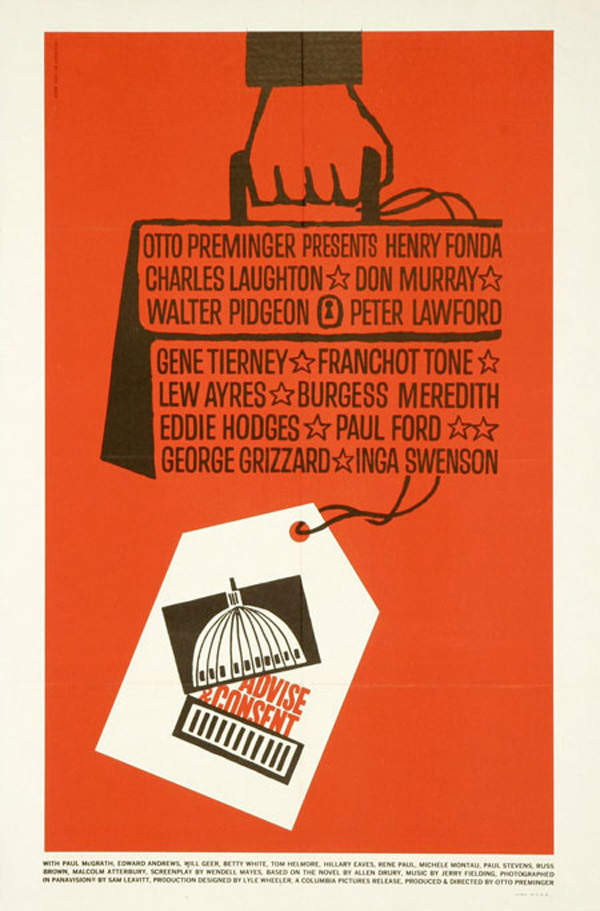
- Theatrical release poster by Saul Bass
- Directed by: Otto Preminger
- Screenplay by: Wendell Mayes
- Based on: Advise and Consent by Allen Drury
- Produced by: Otto Preminger
- Starring: Henry Fonda; Charles Laughton; Don Murray; Walter Pidgeon; Peter Lawford; Gene Tierney; Paul Ford; George Grizzard
- Cinematography: Sam Leavitt
- Edited by: Louis R. Loeffler
- Music by: Jerry Fielding
- Production companies: Otto Preminger Films; Alpha Alpina
- Distributed by: Columbia Pictures
- Release date: July 7, 1962 (United States)
- Running time: 138 minutes
- Country: United States
- Language: English
- Box office: $2 million (US/Canada)

Advise & Consent is a 1962 American political drama film based on the Pulitzer Prize-winning novel Advise and Consent by Allen Drury, published in 1959. It was adapted for the screen by Wendell Mayes and was directed by Otto Preminger. The film, set in Washington, D.C., follows the nomination process of a man who commits perjury in confirmation hearings for his nomination as Secretary of State.

The title derives from Article II, Section 2, Clause 2 of the United States Constitution, which provides that the president of the United States "shall nominate, and by and with the Advice and Consent of the Senate, shall appoint Ambassadors, other public Ministers and Consuls, Judges of the Supreme Court, and all other Officers of the United States."

The ensemble cast features Henry Fonda, Charles Laughton (in his final film role), Don Murray, Walter Pidgeon, Peter Lawford, Gene Tierney, Franchot Tone, Lew Ayres, Burgess Meredith, Eddie Hodges, Paul Ford, George Grizzard, Inga Swenson, Betty White, Edward Andrews, and others.

== Plot ==
The president nominates Robert A. Leffingwell as Secretary of State. The second-term president, who is ill, has chosen him in part because he does not believe that Vice President Harley Hudson, whom both he and others usually ignore, will successfully continue the administration's foreign policy should the president die.

Leffingwell's nomination is controversial within the Senate, which must use its advice and consent powers to approve or reject the appointment. The parties of both the president and the minority are divided. Senate Majority Leader Bob Munson, the senior senator from Michigan, loyally supports the nominee despite his doubts, as do the hard-working majority whip Stanley Danta of Connecticut and womanizer Lafe Smith of Rhode Island. Demagogic peace advocate Fred Van Ackerman of Wyoming is especially supportive, but Munson repeatedly advises him not to aggravate the situation. Although also of the majority party, the curmudgeonly president pro tempore Seabright "Seab" Cooley of South Carolina dislikes Leffingwell for both personal and professional reasons and leads the opposition.

The Senate Foreign Relations Committee appoints a subcommittee, chaired by majority member Brigham Anderson of Utah, to evaluate the nominee. The young and devoted family man is undecided on Leffingwell. Cooley dramatically introduces a surprise witness, Herbert Gelman, during the subcommittee's hearing; the minor Treasury Department clerk testifies that he was briefly affiliated with a communist cell with Leffingwell and two others at the University of Chicago. Leffingwell denies the charge and questions Gelman's credibility but later tells the president that he had committed perjury and that Gelman was telling the truth. He asks the president to withdraw his nomination, but the president refuses.

Cooley identifies another member of the cell, senior Treasury official Hardiman Fletcher. He forces Fletcher to confess to Anderson, who tells Munson. Despite personal lobbying by the president, the subcommittee chairman insists that the White House withdraw the nomination because of Leffingwell's perjury or he will subpoena Fletcher to testify. The president angrily refuses, but the majority leader admits that the White House will soon have to nominate another candidate. Anderson delays his committee's report on Leffingwell, but the president sends Fletcher out of the country, angering the senator.

Anderson's wife receives anonymous phone calls from a man warning that unless the subcommittee reports favorably on Leffingwell, information about what happened with "Ray" in Hawaii will be disclosed. A worried Anderson visits fellow army veteran Ray Schaff in New York. Schaff admits that he sold evidence of a past homosexual relationship between the two. Vice President Hudson and Anderson's friend Smith join others in attempting to counsel the troubled chairman, but unable to reconcile his duty and his secret, Anderson takes his own life.

The president denies knowing about the blackmail to Munson and Hudson. He tells the majority leader that he is dying and that Leffingwell's confirmation is vital. Munson criticizes Cooley for opposing the nominee but not exposing Fletcher and thus forcing Anderson to bear the pressure alone. Anderson's death nonetheless permits the subcommittee and the Foreign Relations Committee to proceed with the nomination. Both report favorably to the full Senate.

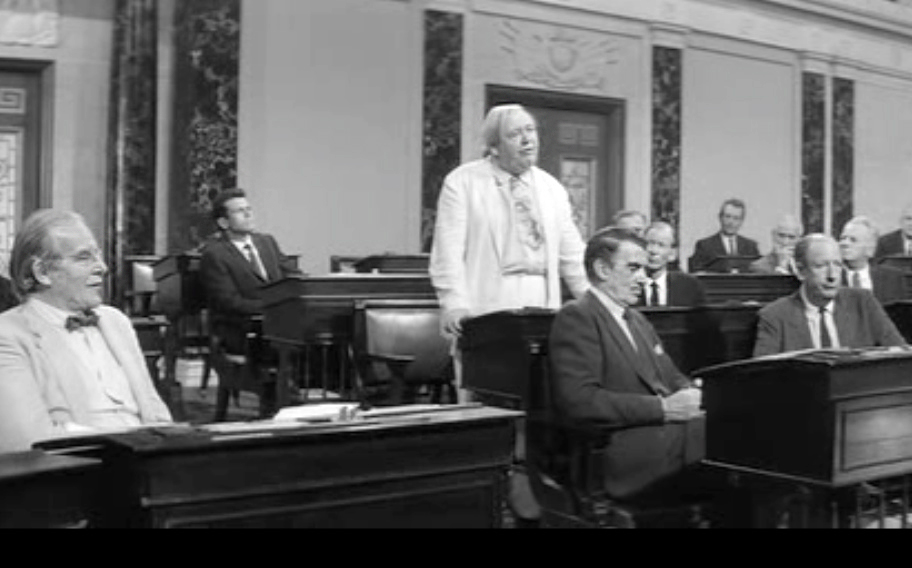
Sen. Seabright Cooley (Charles Laughton) speaking against the Leffingwell nomination on the Senate floor

In the Senate Chamber, Cooley apologizes for his "vindictiveness". While he will vote against Leffingwell and his "alien voice", Cooley will not ask others to follow. Munson, moved by Cooley's action, cites the "tragic circumstances" surrounding the confirmation. The majority leader will vote for Leffingwell but will permit a conscience vote from others. Hudson's quorum call and the majority leader's refusal to yield the floor prevent Van Ackerman from speaking until Munson asks for the "yeas and nays", ending debate. Munson tells Van Ackerman that if not for the Andersons' privacy, the Senate would have expelled him, as he was responsible for the blackmail. Van Ackerman leaves the chamber before the vote.

Munson's side is slightly ahead until Smith unexpectedly votes against Leffingwell, and the majority leader prepares for the vice president to break the tie in the nominee's favor. Secret Service agents enter the chamber, and Hudson receives a message from the Senate chaplain. He announces that he will not break the tie, thus causing the nomination to fail, and that the president has died during the vote. As he leaves with the Secret Service, Hudson tells Munson that he wants to choose his own secretary of state. The film ends as Munson moves to adjourn because of the former president's death.

== Cast ==
- Henry Fonda as Robert A. Leffingwell, Administrator of the Office of Defense Mobilization
- Charles Laughton as Senator Seabright "Seab" Cooley of South Carolina and president pro tempore of the Senate
- Don Murray as Senator Brigham "Brig" Anderson of Utah
- Walter Pidgeon as Senate Majority Leader Robert "Bob" Munson of Michigan
- Peter Lawford as Senator Lafe Smith of Rhode Island
- Gene Tierney as Dolly Harrison, Washington socialite
- Franchot Tone as the President
- Lew Ayres as Vice President Harley Hudson, former governor of Delaware
- Burgess Meredith as Herbert Gelman, former communist associate of Leffingwell
- Eddie Hodges as Johnny Leffingwell, Robert Leffingwell's minor child
- Paul Ford as Senate Majority Whip Stanley Danta of Connecticut
- George Grizzard as Senator Frederick "Fred" Van Ackerman of Wyoming
- Inga Swenson as Ellen Anderson, Senator Brigham Anderson's wife
- Edward Andrews as Senator Orrin Knox of Illinois
- Paul McGrath as Hardiman Fletcher, Treasury official and former communist associate of Gelman and Leffingwell
- Will Geer as Senate Minority Leader Warren Strickland of Idaho
- Betty White as Senator Bessie Adams of Kansas
- Malcolm Atterbury as Senator Tom August of Minnesota, chairman of Foreign Relations Committee
- J. Edward McKinley as Senator Powell Hanson of New Mexico
- Bill Quinn as Senator Paul Hendershot of Indiana
- Tom Helmore as the British ambassador
- Irv Kupcinet as a journalist
- John Granger as Ray Schaff, Senator Anderson's former lover

Notes

- Appearing in two scenes as Senator John J. McCafferty—who, whenever awakened from a deep sleep, automatically responds "Opposed, sir! Opposed!"—was the 87-year-old Henry F. Ashurst, one of the first senators elected by Arizona, serving five terms. Ashurst died on May 31, 1962, about a month before the film's premiere.
- This marked Charles Laughton's final film appearance. He died of cancer on December 15, 1962, five months after the film's release.
- David McCullough, who would later become a renowned author on American history, appeared as an extra in the film.

== Production ==
Preminger offered Martin Luther King Jr. a cameo role as a senator from Georgia, although there were no serving African-American senators at the time. King rejected the offer and put out a press release rejecting any claims that he accepted a role. Former vice president Richard Nixon was offered the role of the vice president, but he refused and pointed out some "glaring and obvious" errors in the script, presumably including the critical fact that under Article II of the U.S. Constitution, the vice president automatically assumes the office of the president upon the president's death, and would not have been able to cast a tie-breaking vote as vice president.

Advise & Consent was one of a sequence of Preminger films that challenged both the Motion Picture Association of America's Production Code and the Hollywood blacklist. It pushed censorship boundaries with its depiction of a married senator who is being blackmailed over a wartime homosexual affair, and was the first mainstream American film after World War II to show a gay bar. Preminger confronted the blacklist by casting known left-wing actors Geer and Meredith. Fonda's character Leffingwell was seen as drawing particularly on real-life State Department official (and accused Soviet spy) Alger Hiss.

The film's poster and advertising campaign by Saul Bass featured a logo: the U.S. Capitol dome opening like a teapot. Bass likewise designed the film's abstract titles which riffed on the stripes in the American flag.

The film marked a screen comeback for Gene Tierney, whose breakthrough to major stardom came in Preminger's 1944 film Laura. Tierney had withdrawn from acting for several years because of her ongoing struggle with bipolar disorder. Advise & Consent was the last of four films she made for Preminger, and one of her last major film roles overall. Advise & Consent was Laughton's last film; he had cancer during filming and died five months after the film's release. Lawford, John F. Kennedy's brother-in-law, plays Lafe Smith, a senator from Rhode Island modeled after Kennedy, although in Drury's book the character represents Iowa. Betty White made her film debut in Advise & Consent, appearing in one scene as a young senator from Kansas.

Many scenes were filmed at real locations in Washington, D.C., including the Capitol, the canteen of the Treasury Building, the Washington Monument and the Crystal Room of the Sheraton Carlton Hotel.

Screenwriter Wendell Mayes called the film "a rather close adaptation" of the original novel because the book had been a best seller "and when you sit down to adapt a best-selling novel, you do feel that since ten million people have read the novel, they must like it, and they want to see what they've read. So we made a great effort to try to translate that book to film." However he admits "The author of the novel, Allen Drury, hated the picture. He's very conservative-as a matter of fact, he's an archconservative-and Otto and I are liberals, so we didn't do justice to his conservative point of view."

On May 10, 2005, Warner Bros. released the film on DVD as part of its Controversial Classics box set. The following year, it was included in the Henry Fonda Signature Collection.

The Academy Film Archive preserved Advise & Consent in 2007.

== Critical response ==
The staff of Variety considered the screenplay problematic, writing: "As interpreted by producer-director Otto Preminger and scripter Wendell Mayes, Advise and Consent is intermittently well dialogued and too talky, and, strangely, arrested in its development and illogical... Preminger has endowed his production with wholly capable performers... The characterizations come through with fine clarity." However, they praised the cast and the acting, noting, "the characterizations come through with fine clarity."

The New York Times film critic Bosley Crowther did not like the storyline, writing: "Without even giving the appearance of trying to be accurate and fair about the existence of a reasonable balance of good men and rogues in government, Mr. Preminger and Wendell Mayes, his writer, taking their cue from Mr. Drury's book, have loaded their drama with rascals to show the types in Washington." Crowther also was bothered by the use of the homosexual affair. He wrote, "It is in this latter complication that the nature of the drama is finally exposed for the deliberately scandalous, sensational and caustic thing it is. Mr. Preminger has his character go through a lurid and seamy encounter with his old friend before cutting his throat, an act that seems unrealistic, except as a splashy high point for the film."

In 1982, critic John Simon described Advise & Consent as "pure hokum."

On Rotten Tomatoes, the film has an approval rating of 79% based on reviews from 14 critics.

== Accolades ==
Wins

- National Board of Review: NBR Award, Best Supporting Actor, Burgess Meredith: 1962

Nominations

- 1962 Cannes Film Festival: Palme d'Or.
- British Academy of Film and Television Arts: BAFTA Film Award, Best Foreign Actor, Charles Laughton: 1963

== See also ==
- List of American films of 1962
