= That Summer (Drury novel) =

1965 novel by Allen Drury

- UK first edition
- Author: Allen Drury
- Language: English
- Publisher: Michael Joseph (UK); Coward-McCann (US)
- Publication date: 1965 (UK); 1966 (US)
- Publication place: United Kingdom
- Media type: Print (hardcover & paperback)
- Pages: 293

That Summer is a 1965 novel by political novelist Allen Drury which chronicles melodrama among the elite in the California town of Greenmont. It was first published in the United Kingdom by Michael Joseph, and then by Coward-McCann in the United States in 1966.

The 1967 Dell paperback edition featured the tagline, "the new Peyton Place of the California monied set, by the Pulitzer Prize-winning author of Advise and Consent".
