= Egypt: The Eternal Smile =

1980 non-fiction book by Allen Drury

- US first edition cover
- Author: Allen Drury
- Language: English
- Genre: Non-fiction; Travelogue; Coffee table book
- Publisher: Doubleday
- Publication date: October 1980
- Publication place: United States
- Media type: Print (hardcover)
- Pages: 272
- ISBN: 0-385-00193-2

Egypt: The Eternal Smile: Reflections on a Journey is a 1980 non-fiction coffee table book by Allen Drury. It is a travelogue of a trip through Egypt undertaken by Drury and photographer Alex Gotfryd.

== Overview ==
Egypt: The Eternal Smile chronicles a journey between Abu Simbel and Alexandria, with Drury's observations punctuated by Gotfryd's photographs. Drury provides a wealth of information about ancient Egyptian history, culture, and religion.

== Critical reception ==
Noting Drury's "highly vivid, personal impressions", Diana Loercher wrote in The Christian Science Monitor:

[Drury] is clearly far more at home in the land of fiction than fact and is at his best when the employs his novelistic talents to create atmosphere, discern the timeless links between past and present, and characterize the pharaohs. At times his dramatization of history seems too presumptuous and his style too jaunty. Yet, in sum, the book offers an engaging potpourri of travel tips, local color, and historical fact, along with a version of ancient Egypt that makes up for in originality what it lacks in objectivity.
