= A Very Strange Society =

1967 non-fiction book by Allen Drury

A Very Strange Society: A Journey to the Heart of South Africa
- First edition cover
- Author: Allen Drury
- Language: English
- Genre: Non-fiction
- Publisher: Trident Press
- Publication date: 1967
- Publication place: United States
- Media type: Print (hardcover & paperback)
- Pages: 465
- ISBN: 1-299-27312-2

A Very Strange Society: A Journey to the Heart of South Africa is a 1967 non-fiction book by Allen Drury. It explores the then-evolving government and culture of the Republic of South Africa.

== Overview ==
Combining newspaper articles, interviews and government edicts, Drury presents the "achievements and failures" of the new republic, which was founded in 1961.

== Critical reception ==
In November 1967, Kirkus Reviews wrote:

Utilizing a pro and con format, Drury presents a rather convincing case why a minority of whites should be in a position to totally dominate and manipulate a vastly larger non-white population. Although he scores Afrikaan provincialism, police-state methods, and obduracy, it is done in a manner that suggests redemption will come from the purging of traits rather than ideology. In a sense, this book derives its lethality from what it most certainly isn't — crackpot and extremist. On the other hand, it most certainly fails as a dispassionate and objective handling of the South African dilemma.
