= A Shade of Difference =

1962 novel by Allen Drury

- First edition
- Author: Allen Drury
- Language: English
- Series: Advise and Consent
- Genre: Political novel
- Published: September 20, 1962
- Publisher: Doubleday
- Publication place: United States
- Media type: Print (Hardcover)
- Pages: 603
- OCLC: 282789
- Preceded by: Advise and Consent
- Followed by: Capable of Honor

A Shade of Difference (ISBN 0-385-02389-8) is a 1962 political novel written by Allen Drury. It is the first sequel to Advise and Consent, for which Drury was awarded the Pulitzer Prize for Fiction in 1960, and was followed in 1966 by Capable of Honor.

The novel focuses on the politics among delegations to the United Nations and the troubles that Third World nations cause the United States as it vies for political advantages against the Soviet Union during the Cold War, as well as racial tensions within the United States surrounding the integration of public schools in southern states.

Advise and Consent and its sequels had been out of print for almost 15 years until WordFire Press reissued them in paperback and e-book format in 2014.
