= A Beautifully Foolish Endeavor =

2020 novel written by Hank Green

A Beautifully Foolish Endeavour
- First edition cover
- Author: Hank Green
- Cover artist: Kaitlin Kall
- Language: English
- Genre: Speculative fiction
- Published: July 7, 2020
- Publisher: Dutton Books
- Publication place: United States
- Media type: Print, e-book
- Pages: 446
- ISBN: 978-1-524-74347-5
- Preceded by: An Absolutely Remarkable Thing

A Beautifully Foolish Endeavor is a science fiction novel by American author Hank Green that was published on July 7, 2020. Green's second novel, also starring main character April May, is the sequel to An Absolutely Remarkable Thing and the final installment in the Carl Saga.

== Plot summary ==
Following April May's sudden death, her friends Andy, Robin, and Miranda, and her ex-girlfriend Maya, grapple with how the world has changed since her disappearance. Andy has been publicly speaking with Robin as his agent and Miranda has returned to her studies at UC Berkeley, working towards a PhD. However, Maya refuses to believe April is dead. The public has largely moved on from her absence, and from Carl's sudden disappearance, but dealing with withdrawals from the sudden absence of the Dream, many individuals sign up for games that attempt to mimic the simulations of the Dream in real life.

After receiving a text from April's phone number—"knock knock"—Andy answers the door to find a book titled The Book of Good Times. As Andy reads, he realizes the book is telling him what to do. It warns him not to tell anyone about it or it will not work, and instructs him to invest certain ways, to ask out Bex (the girl who works at his local Subway), and to tell Miranda "yes" when she calls. He follows the instructions because he believes they will lead him to April. Eventually, Miranda calls him to get his opinion on whether or not she should apply to work at Altus, a company headed by Peter Petrawicki, April's nemesis. Miranda intends to spy on Petrawicki's company and commit espionage, believing they are up to something dangerous. Against his better judgement, Andy tells Miranda she should apply.

Miranda applies to Altus and is flown out soon after. She learns each applicant is only allowed to send out a single 400 word email to their family letting them know they're alright, and no one can leave. She is taken to a demo room along with other applicants, where they are given headsets that take them into the Altus Space; a simulation that mimics the Dream. However, someone in Miranda's group gets sick and is visibly unsettled. Peter Petrawicki explains this is called "body dislocation" and occurs when the consciousness does not enter the "body" in the program properly, but promises it is rare. He reveals that anybody who experiences the phenomenon will never be able to enter the Altus Space—it will happen every time they try again.

After nearly dying in the warehouse fire, April has been slowly reconstructed by Carl. Half of her face and most of her body are made of a nearly unbreakable, white, iridescent substance. It's been melded into her anatomy, but looks inhuman. Feeling frightened and hysterical, April leaves and encounters Maya, who had driven to New Jersey based on conspiracies about April on the Som. They hide in a motel when a man breaks in with a gun, and Carl intervenes. After escaping, they stay in an empty school building for a few days. Carl explains they were sent to stop humanity from self destructing, but when April was nearly killed, their brother stepped in. Their brother, acting through Altus, has started reining humanity in, as planned if Carl failed. Human free will, Carl concludes, will be lost forever if Altus is not taken down in time.

Unknown to Miranda and the other workers at Altus, the Altus program has already been released to the public. Andy quickly becomes addicted to it, noticing people outside less and less. Eventually, a new copy of The Book of Good Times arrives, and, following its instructions, he is reunited with April and Maya. Robin arrives soon after, revealing he also had his own copy of The Book of Good Times. Knowing Altus must be taken down, the four begin to plan.

Petrawicki personally shows Miranda "Altus Premium". Unlike the public Altus Space, Premium allows one to experience the thoughts of another person by inhabiting their memory. Peter then takes her to the "servers" where she sees people who are "mining", all of whom are glued to their headsets and live as if quarantined without ever leaving the Altus Space. Miranda is locked in a separate area. With no company, she begins to use Altus as her one outlet into the world. She believes she is waking up, but eventually she realizes she has been barred from leaving and has been in Altus for days, if not weeks. She manages to leave a message for Andy in one of her constructed simulations.

Andy contacts April and Maya, who are already heading to Val Verde to take down Altus. Initially, it seems their plan is going well; April confronts Peter, Maya wakes up Miranda, and Carl hacks into the wifi so Andy can receive video of what is happening at the Altus headquarters. However, their plan to convince the public that Altus was immoral falls apart, as most people are too addicted to care. Miranda is possessed by Carl's brother, as the rest of the people trapped in Altus are, and she nearly kills Maya. Carl uses the last of their energy to free Miranda from their sibling, and Miranda is able to enact her last minute plan to lock people out of Altus.

Whenever an update is installed to Altus, everyone logged on experiences it, and everyone not logged on experiences it as soon as they log on. Miranda finds a coworker who experienced body dislocation and uploads his memory as an update, so everyone logged on or logging in immediately experiences body dislocation. Since body dislocation only has to happen once for it to happen every time, no one is able to return to Altus Space, effectively shutting down Altus.

Andy is the most upset with the removal of Altus, but over time he comes to accept it and finds happiness with Bex. Miranda returns to Berkeley, leading a team of a few friends she made while working at Altus. April and Maya move into a house together and take care of the monkey Carl once inhabited. Carl is gone, but they find one last copy of The Book of Good Times in Maya's potato plant. In it, Carl tells them their brother is still watching and monitoring to see if humanity needs to be reined in, but is otherwise dormant.

== Reception ==
Delfina V Barbiero of USA Today gave the book 3 1/2 out of 4 stars, noting that "Green gives nuance to the privileges of escapism with humor and grace through main characters taking a chance on hope, even if it is beautifully foolish."

== Translations ==
- Portuguese, transl. Lígia Azevedo: Um esforço lindo e fútil (2020)
- Danish, transl. Thomas Munkholt: En smuk og tåbelig stræben (2021)
- Dutch, transl. Karin de Haas: Een mooie vreemde ontdekking (2021)
- Finnish, transl. Kaisa Kattelus: Loistavan hullu hanke (2021)
- Czech, transl. Julie Tesla: Nádherně pošetilá snaha (2022)
- Russian, transl. Lydia Galushkina: Прекрасная глупая попытка (Prekrasnaya glupaya popytka) (2022)
