= A God Against the Gods =

1976 novel by Allen Drury

- US first edition
- Author: Allen Drury
- Language: English
- Genre: Historical novel
- Publisher: Doubleday
- Publication date: July 1976
- Publication place: United States
- Media type: Print (hardcover & paperback)
- Pages: 310
- ISBN: 0-385-00199-1
- Followed by: Return to Thebes

A God Against the Gods is a 1976 historical novel by political novelist Allen Drury, which chronicles ancient Egyptian Pharaoh Akhenaten's attempt to establish a new religion in Egypt. It is told in a series of monologues by the various characters.

Drury wrote a 1977 sequel, Return to Thebes, and a 1980 nonfiction book about Egypt. According to Drury the political struggles of Egypt resembled those of Washington, D. C.

Both A God Against the Gods and Return to Thebes were reprinted in 2015 by WordFire Press.

== Plot summary ==
The ancient Egyptian empire, which stretched from modern day Syria across northern Africa, has reached its apex under the House of Thebes, the ruling family of the 18th dynasty. However, though the long-reigning Pharaoh Amenhotep III is popular, he is not very active, and the day to day rule of the empire is actually performed by his wife, Queen Tiye, who is beloved and is known as the Great Wife. The chief counselor to the Pharaoh is her brother, Aye, who has a reputation for wisdom. The House of Thebes had encouraged devotion to the god Amon-Ra, whose cult has become very powerful. Amenhotep had hoped to control the priests of Amon by making his wife's brother, Aanen, the High Priest, but as Tiye feared, Aanen has tried to make the priests of Amon of equal power with the throne. To counter them, Amenhotep has made his six-year-old son Tuthmose high priest of another cult, and plans on making him co-regent. The priests of Amon insist on accompanying him to the ceremony, and then drown him in shallow water, claiming he fell in.

Grief-stricken and furious, Amenhotep and Tiye decide to emphasize the cult of the Aten. Like Amon, it is a manifestation of the overarching deity, Ra, the Sun. Tiye delivers a son whom they name Amenhotep, and dedicate to the Aten. Aye loses his wife in childbirth the same day, but the baby girl survives and is named Nefertiti. Amenhotep IV is at first healthy and happy, but is then stricken with a strange disease that misshapes his head and body. When he comes of age, he is married to Nefertiti. Now co-regent, Amenhotep IV is very dedicated to the Aten, and gives the deity a new symbol, a sun disk with twelve rays that end in hands. While the cult of Amon is a mystery religion, with the totem of Amon kept in a dark vault, the temples that Amenhotep has built for the Aten are open and sunny. Amenhotep begins to make his public appearances naked, and commands his sculptor to portray his misshapen body exactly as it is. He explains to his family that when he prayed to the other gods, his disease did not go away, but that when he had prayed to the Aten, the disease stopped its progress.

Amenhotep takes the name Akhenaten, and announces that he is building a new capital, Akhetaten (modern day tel-el-Amarna), dedicated solely to the Aten. At this insult to Amon, the High Priest Aanen rushes at the young Pharaoh, but is instantly killed by Kaires, a trusted young soldier. As the old Pharaoh grows weaker, Akhenaten becomes stronger. He reveals that Kaires is in fact the illegitimate son of Aye, who acknowledges him in a public ceremony. Kaires takes the name Horemheb, and is given control over vast military and construction operations. Akhenaten himself does not concentrate on ruling, instead publicly worshipping the Aten, hoping to attract new adherents. The public has accepted his strangeness and are unconcerned about his devotion to one particular god, but are not interested in following his lead and do not want Amon to be insulted.

Akhenaten and Nefertiti are unable to have sons. Desperate for a male heir, Akhenaten makes one of his own daughters pregnant, but the baby dies in childbirth and the young princess is unable to have more children. Akhenaten turns to his own younger brother, the handsome teenager Smenkhara, to be his heir and lover. Humiliated, Nefertiti asks permission to move into her own palace, in part so she can protect her other two daughters. Akhenaten is insulted. The relationship between the men becomes public, and the populace is not pleased. The family—including Akhenaten's mother Tiye—try to maintain order, but are finding it increasingly difficult.

The old Pharaoh Amenhotep III finally dies, and people can be heard to hiss at Akhenaten during the funeral procession to the Valley of the Kings. The hissing is especially audible when the procession stops by the temple of Amon on the way. After Amenhotep is interred, Akhenaten suddenly orders the royal barge to return to the temple of Amon. Furious at the hissing of the crowd, he orders his troops to batter down the doors to the temple, and has the statue of Amon brought out of its dark cell and thrown into the Nile, to the horror of everyone. Akhenaten announces that from that point on, the only legal religion is that of the Aten, and everyone is required to worship him alone. He also announces that Nefertiti cannot bear sons and deems her unfit to be Queen. He makes Smenhkara his co-regent, noting the boy to be "one with me in our hearts, bodies, and all things".

== Sequel ==
Return to Thebes
- US first edition
- Author: Allen Drury
- Language: English
- Genre: Historical novel
- Publisher: Doubleday
- Publication date: February 1977
- Publication place: United States
- Media type: Print (hardcover & paperback)
- Pages: 272
- ISBN: 0-385-04199-3
- Preceded by: A God Against the Gods

In 1977, Drury released the sequel Return to Thebes, in which the priests of the old polytheistic religion try to reassert control over Akhenaten and Nefertiti. Having failed to fully establish his new monotheistic religion and having made many enemies in the attempt, Akhenaten finds himself in a dangerous position. The story is told from the alternating perspectives of its many characters, including Akhenaten, his brother and lover Smenkhkara, Nefertiti, Tutankhamon, Aye and Horemheb.

Kirkus Reviews called Return to Thebes "accessible Egyptology" while noting that "all those first-person spiels do manage to keep the history dusted, but, with fragmented viewpoints, only Akhenaten can grab any sympathy."

James R. Frakes of The New York Times called Return to Thebes "an anesthesiologist's dream—monologue after monologue all yakking about the same things ... Drury's aim is honorable, but to evoke in prose the savage stillness of Egyptian friezes would require the pressurized genius of Beckett or an equally rabid poet of space and spirit."
