= An Absolutely Remarkable Thing =

2018 novel written by Hank Green

- Author: Hank Green
- Language: English
- Genre: Speculative fiction
- Published: September 25, 2018
- Publisher: Dutton Books
- Publication place: United States
- Media type: Print, e-book
- Pages: 352
- Followed by: A Beautifully Foolish Endeavor

An Absolutely Remarkable Thing is a science fiction novel by American author Hank Green. It was published on September 25, 2018, by Dutton Books, and is Green's debut novel. Announced on September 19, 2017, the novel is the first of a two-book series, followed by A Beautifully Foolish Endeavor.

== Plot summary ==
Protagonist April May discovers a large robot sculpture in Midtown Manhattan. She and her friend Andy Skampt decide to film it and post the video online, which goes viral and makes April an overnight celebrity. All over the world identical structures—known as "Carls"—have appeared in major cities at exactly the same time.

It turns out that there are 64 Carls distributed in cities across the globe, which have miraculously appeared at once. As well, gradually almost all of humanity find themselves entering an interactive dream when they sleep, within an identical landscape filled with puzzles that provide clues when solved. Over the course of a few months, April and her friends Andy, Miranda, and Robin work to solve the codes and riddles of the Carls throughout the Dream.

Several governments restrict access to the Carls, leading April to become more politically active, and an interview on a news show alongside the conservative pundit Peter Petrawicki, who has written an already bestselling 20-page book called Invaded arguing that the Carls, representing a foreign invader, are dangerous. As a result, over the following months, April cultivates a friendly persona and writes her own book, saying that people should use the social internet in a positive way to work together at solving the sequences, some of which require specific knowledge and collaboration.

April then tries to solve the final clue, a unique dream sequence involving a Boeing 767 which only she has access to, which would complete the vector image. After she discloses to the public that the 767 sequence exists, her personal assistant Robin tells her that the Defenders have solved it. Miranda gives April the apparent solution: a nearby address and the words, "Only April. No One Else." In her haste to beat the Defenders to the solution, April rushes to the address against Maya's advice, where she finds a large empty warehouse. She live-streams herself on Facebook, expecting to communicate with Carl. The warehouse is a trap, however, and the false address is a product of tampered clues.

April is locked in the warehouse, which becomes engulfed in flames. Facebook commentators realize that the lyrics to a song playing in the warehouse—David Bowie's "Golden Years"—have been changed to say, "In every town around the world each of us must be touched with gold". In an epiphany, April tells her hundred-million-strong worldwide audience to touch a sample of gold to each of the Carls simultaneously. The police tell April to break a window and jump out, but after she does so, a burning wooden beam falls on, crushes, and presumably kills April.

April, suddenly transported into the Dream, talks to Carl and learns that Carl indeed arrived to observe humanity. In addition, Carl specifically picked April to make First Contact.

In the real world, New York Carl launches into the air, and every Carl in the world simultaneously vanishes. In the next few weeks, the world reacts to April's death, and The Defenders are completely discredited for their actions. Eventually, the world returns to normal. Months later, Andy hears a knock at his door and receives a text from April saying, "Knock Knock".

== Publication history ==
Green had been working on An Absolutely Remarkable Thing since approximately 2013; he had initially planned it to be a graphic novel, but later decided to turn it into a novel. He wrote about 40,000 words of the novel during NaNoWriMo in 2015. While writing, he drew inspiration from Dune and Michael Connelly's series starring the character Harry Bosch. Green describes the book as a work of speculative fiction. Green revealed the working title of the novel was April May and New York Carl. A sequel to the book, titled A Beautifully Foolish Endeavor, was released July 7, 2020.

To promote the book's release, Hank Green's brother John Green started a surprise campaign to promote Hank's novel, including renting several billboards near their hometown of Orlando, sponsoring four FIRST robotics teams and a college rugby club in Montana, and making An Absolutely Remarkable Thing the official training kit sponsor of AFC Wimbledon, among other advertisements. John also joined Hank for six of his book tour stops.

== Reception ==
Reviews have focused on the book's humor as well as the deep knowledge of online community and internet fame that Green weaves into the story. Lincee Ray for AP News called it a "thrilling journey", a blend of "humor, mystery, and science fiction" that "takes a hard look at the power of fame and our willingness to separate a person from the brand." Alexis Gunderson of Paste wrote, "It's not in the nature of a sci-fi comedy blockbuster to shift boulders in your soul. But with his debut novel, An Absolutely Remarkable Thing, Hank Green pulls it off." Gunderson described the novel as "deeply human" and challenging, noting that "there is, in the end, a gigantic mystery that Green leaves wide open." This ending, Publishers Weekly warned, may leave some unsatisfied, and they suggested it may be setting up a sequel.

However, Entertainment Weekly gave it a C and noted, "the writing is lacking", with "dialogue that verges on ghastly".

== Sequel ==
The book's sequel, titled A Beautifully Foolish Endeavor, was published on July 7, 2020.

== Translations ==
- Dutch, transl. Karin de Haas: Een Zeer Opmerkelijk Verschijnsel (2018)
- Brazilian Portuguese, transl. Lígia Azevedo: Uma Coisa Absolutamente Fantástica (2018)
- Danish, transl. Randi Bjerre Høfring: Et fuldstændig fantastisk fænomen (2018)
- German, transl. Katarina Ganslandt: Ein Wirklich Erstaunliches Ding (2019)
- Finnish, transl. Kaisa Kattelus: Ihan mieletön juttu (2019)
- Czech, transl. Julie Tesla: Naprosto pozoruhodná věc (2019)
- Russian, transl. Elena Muzykantova: Совершенно замечательная вещь (Sovershenno zamechatelnaya veshch) (2019)
- Spanish, transl. Noemí Sobregués: Algo Absolutamente Extraordinario (2019)
- Turkish, transl. Çiçek Eriş: Gerçekten Harika Bir Şey (2020)
