= Allen Drury's University series =

Novel trio by Allen Drury

University series
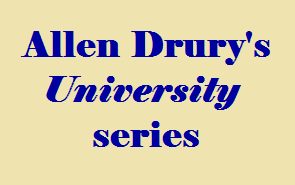
- Toward What Bright Glory? (1990); Into What Far Harbor? (1993); Public Men (1998)
- Author: Allen Drury
- Country: United States
- Language: English
- Genre: Political novel
- Publisher: William Morrow/Scribner
- Published: June 1990 – November 1998
- Media type: Print (hardcover & paperback)

Allen Drury's University series is a trio of novels written by political novelist Allen Drury between 1990 and 1998, which follow a group of university fraternity brothers for a span of over 60 years from 1938 to 2001. Drury graduated from Stanford University in 1939, and his experiences there provided the basis for the series. The novels are set in a different fictional timeline from Drury's 1959 novel Advise and Consent, which earned him a Pulitzer Prize for Fiction.

Toward What Bright Glory? (1990) introduces Richard "Willie" Wilson and his diverse Alpha Zeta fraternity brothers, who are beginning their senior year at "the University" as war in Europe looms on the horizon. Into What Far Harbor? (1993) finds the remaining Alpha Zetas returning from World War II and facing a new set of challenges in a changed world. Finally in Public Men (1998), octogenarian Willie plans a 2001 reunion for his surviving pals as he looks back on his run for the Presidency decades earlier.

Drury completed Public Men two weeks before his death in 1998, and the novel was published posthumously.

== Toward What Bright Glory? (1990) ==
Toward What Bright Glory?
- Author: Allen Drury
- Language: English
- Series: University series
- Genre: Political novel
- Published: June 1990
- Publisher: William Morrow & Co.
- Publication place: United States
- Media type: Print (hardcover & paperback)
- Pages: 527
- ISBN: 0-688-07713-7
- Followed by: Into What Far Harbor?

Toward What Bright Glory? is the first novel in Allen Drury's University series, published in 1990. It introduces Willie Wilson and his diverse Alpha Zeta fraternity brothers, who are beginning their senior year at "the University," unnamed, but matching the description of his alma mater, Stanford, as war in Europe looms on the horizon. Kirkus Reviews gave this overview:

Drury's saga is a cornucopia of controversial issues, with characters representing a veritable What's What of social ills: Bayard Johnson, the quiet African-American crossing the color line as a Stanford undergraduate; Rudy Krohl, the strident Aryan-American, intolerant and relentless in his defense of appeasement; "Duke" Offenberg, the resident Jew, burdened by his racial history and by current events; North McAllister, the tormented homosexual trying to keep his secret, but recklessly in love. Not to mention the dumb jock, "Moose" Musavich; the crusading newspaper editor, Tim Bates; or the football team's favorite plaything, Suzy "Welcome" Waggoner ... The world's problems find close quarters on campus in the context of daily life in a fraternity house, but are mostly held in check by the benign presence of Willie Wilson, student-body head and the archetypical Joe College.

=== Plot summary ===
In 1938, student body president Willie Wilson begins his senior year at "the University" with the threat of war in Europe looming. He and his diverse Alpha Zeta fraternity brothers find themselves facing off in a microcosm of the changing world around them. Wilson tries to sponsor the fraternity's first Black member, only to be thwarted by the blatantly racist scion of a South Carolina family. The Black student blames Wilson for building his hopes up. Also, another member is hopelessly in love with Wilson's younger brother.

=== Critical reception ===
Library Journal complimented the novel as "bustling" and "old-fashioned", conceding that "the large cast is initially confusing, and some awkward writing doesn't help, but the storytelling soon gathers momentum, engrossing the reader in the fate of the numerous characters." Publishers Weekly wrote:

Drury's 17th novel is a long, long book, a fact that will be painfully obvious to those who plod through to the end ... there are a plethora of formulaic characters and situations that portend all the issues of the latter two-thirds of the 20th century ... There are some saving graces — the protagonist is not quite perfect, with a nice touch of arrogance that slightly humanizes him; and many readers will be surprised by which of the two women in his life finally gets the ring — but, overall, the book is a dreary bore.

Kirkus Reviews called the many characters "tokens and stereotypes all", noting that "sweet scenes of halcyon days and noble youth coming-of-age are mixed with heavy dollops of melodrama, and the result is pure treacle" and calling the novel "painfully slow, woefully anachronistic — though a real gem for Stanford boosters and alums."

== Into What Far Harbor? (1993) ==
Into What Far Harbor?
- Author: Allen Drury
- Language: English
- Series: University series
- Genre: Political novel
- Published: April 1993
- Publisher: William Morrow & Co.
- Publication place: United States
- Media type: Print (hardcover & paperback)
- Pages: 383
- ISBN: 0-688-07714-5
- Preceded by: Toward What Bright Glory?
- Followed by: Public Men

Into What Far Harbor? is the second novel in Allen Drury's University series, published in 1993. It rejoins the remaining Alpha Zetas after World War II, and has been called a "portrait of a generation struggling to find its way."

Promotional copy for the novel read:

In the years following the war, Willie and his friends must decide what they will do with their gift of life. Allen Drury's Into What Far Harbor? ... further develops the characters introduced in Toward What Bright Glory? as they seek that peaceful harbor of the good life, which seemed so distant in the mid-1940s. And which continues to elude them as they travel forth into the 1960s. Into What Far Harbor? is a story of survival, of success and broken dreams, of discovering what for each man or woman is tolerable, and what is not. Along the way the group will confront their individual attitudes toward race, sexuality, religion, and politics and will try to guide their own children as they grow into young adulthood. Set against the dramatic events of the mid-twentieth century, from World War II to Korea to the Cold War to Vietnam and ranging from Washington, D.C., to rapidly reviving West Germany, Into What Far Harbor? is a ... reflection of a generation coming of age in a time of great conflict.

=== Plot summary ===
Returning from the war, Willie Wilson and the remaining fraternity brothers of Alpha Zeta face a post-war world with new challenges, including marital and family woes, complicated sexuality, the Cold War and the Vietnam War.

Far down Palm Drive he could see the dusty summer green of the Oval, the bright mosaic front of the Memorial Church, the gentle outlines of the Coast Range rising beyond. All was calm and placid in the warmth of the last September afternoon. The terrible war — the troubled peace — lives begun and already half over. It was twenty-five years since he had last seen that peaceful sight.
It was only yesterday.
World War II is over.
And he has survived.

— Allen Drury, Into What Far Harbor?

== Public Men (1998) ==
Public Men
- Author: Allen Drury
- Language: English
- Series: University series
- Genre: Political novel
- Published: November 2, 1998
- Publisher: Scribner
- Publication place: United States
- Media type: Print (hardcover & paperback)
- Pages: 384
- ISBN: 0-684-80703-3
- Preceded by: Into What Far Harbor?

Public Men is the third and final novel in Allen Drury's University series, published in 1998. A 2001 reunion of the surviving Alpha Zeta fraternity brothers frames Willie Wilson's flashbacks to the decades since the events of Into What Far Harbor?.

Drury completed Public Men two weeks before his death in 1998, and the novel was published posthumously.

=== Plot summary ===
Octogenarian Willie Wilson plans a 2001 reunion for his surviving pals as he looks back on the previous few decades of his life, including his run for the Presidency in the 1980s. Crossing him at every turn in these turbulent times is the villainous René Suratt.

=== Critical reception ===
Publishers Weekly called Drury's final novel "one last hyperbolic salvo at those he deems culpable for America's plummeting moral, cultural and political values" and suggested that "the story crumbles beneath the weight of its own world-weariness and despair for a nation that no longer measures up to the author's ideals." The review also noted:

Wilson and Suratt persist for decades in their barely civilized debate, fueling it with an inexhaustible supply of enmity and mutual jealousy. Unfortunately for the reader, it's like watching two drivers who engage in strident highway shouting matches on their daily commute between glass house and ivory tower.

Erik Tarloff wrote in The New York Times, "the real problem with Public Men is less its political content than its inability to hit its chosen targets." He added, "this is a book that, fittingly enough, matches its valedictory status with a valedictory tone and atmosphere. But it isn't likely to satisfy readers who aren't already devotees of Mr. Drury's work." Mary Carroll of Booklist said of the book, "There's nothing subtle about the politics here, but readers who enjoyed Drury's earlier University novels will want to peruse the final leg of these public men's journey to that great frat house in the sky." Barbara Conaty wrote for Library Journal:

The novel is like the ultimate Christmas letter, offering chatty, reflective accounts of people just before death's threshold. Lugubrious in its pessimism, it has a profound resonance with fin-de-siècle America ... Many fans will enjoy the novel's elegiac flavor as it reflects on battles lost and won; new readers will want to continue into Drury's backlist of 19 novels.

Kirkus Reviews called the novel "a middlebrow time-passer for the Drury faithful" and noted, "Drury's a high-spirited and dreadful stylist. Still, there's some fun in his romping run-on sentences and larger-than-life cardboard figures, mouthing off paralyzing nullities as they batter straw horses." The Amazon.com review stated, "Political junkies will appreciate the twists and turns of this Washington insider novel. Readers who require a modicum of literary polish, however, will be disappointed. Drury's talents lie in plotting his intricate tales; his writing is merely serviceable."
