= Allen Drury =

American writer

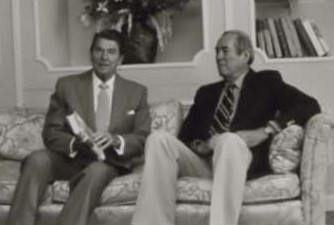
- Ronald Reagan visits with Drury in 1981
- Born: September 2, 1918; Houston, Texas, U.S.
- Died: September 2, 1998 (aged 80); San Francisco, California, U.S.
- Education: Stanford University (BA)
- Occupations: Journalist; novelist
- Years active: 1943–1998
- Employers: Tulare Bee; Bakersfield Californian; Pathfinder Magazine; Washington Evening Star; The New York Times
- Known for: Pulitzer Prize for Fiction and 20 novels

Allen Stuart Drury (September 2, 1918 – September 2, 1998) was an American novelist. During World War II, he was a reporter in the Senate, closely observing Presidents Franklin D. Roosevelt and Harry S. Truman, among others. He would convert these experiences into his first novel Advise and Consent, for which he won the Pulitzer Prize for Fiction in 1960. Long afterwards, it was still being praised as ‘the definitive Washington tale’. His diaries from this period were published as A Senate Journal 1943–45.

== Early life and ancestry ==
Drury was born on September 2, 1918, in Houston, Texas, to Alden Monteith Drury (1895–1975), a citrus industry manager, real estate broker, and insurance agent, and Flora Allen (1894–1973), a legislative representative for the California Parent-Teacher Association. The family moved to Whittier, California, where Alden and Flora had a daughter, Anne Elizabeth (1924–1998). Drury was a direct descendant of Hugh Drury (1616–1689) and Lydia Rice (1627–1675), daughter of Edmund Rice (1594–1663), all of whom were early immigrants to Massachusetts Bay Colony.

Allen Stuart Drury grew up in Porterville, California, and earned his B.A. at Stanford University, where he joined Alpha Kappa Lambda, in 1939. He told Writer's Yearbook that he was "associate editor, wrote a column, and editorials." His last series of novels, written shortly before he died, were inspired by his experiences at Stanford. After graduating from Stanford, Drury went to work for the Tulare Bee in Porterville in 1940, where he won the Sigma Delta Chi Award for editorial writing from the Society of Professional Journalists. He then moved to Bakersfield and wrote for the Bakersfield Californian, where he "handled what they called county news." Drury enlisted in the U.S. Army on July 25, 1942, in Los Angeles and trained as an infantry soldier, but was discharged "because of an old back injury."

== A Senate Journal ==
A Senate Journal (1963)

In 1943, Drury moved to Washington. "I went East and wound up in Washington, which fascinated me, and I thought I would get a job for about a year for experience before coming back to the coast. I came back twenty years later, finally."

From 1943 to 1945, Drury worked as the United States Senate correspondent for United Press which, as he wrote, gave him the opportunity "to be of some slight assistance in making my fellow countrymen better acquainted with their Congress and particularly their Senate." He worked as a reporter, but also kept a journal in which he recorded the events of Congress as well as his impressions and views of individual senators and the Senate itself. Drury's journal followed the career of Harry S. Truman from junior senator to President of the United States, and also covered "President Franklin D. Roosevelt and his contentious relations with the Senate." The journal was published in 1963 as A Senate Journal 1943–45 after Drury had experienced great success with his 1959 novel Advise and Consent.

After leaving United Press, he free-lanced for a year, writing a column for local papers in the West. "This venture lasted about a year and did not succeed, as it does not for many people." He then moved to Pathfinder Magazine, a general news magazine. From there, he moved to the Washington Evening Star, where he gained a reputation for the quality of his writing. Various pieces from this period were collected in a volume entitled Three Kids in a Cart.

== Advise and Consent and later works ==
In 1954, James Reston, the Washington bureau chief of The New York Times, hired Drury. Russell Baker, hired at about the same time, recalled the circumstances in a remembrance published after Drury's death:

He had a reputation as an elegant writer when he came to the paper. Scotty Reston was then trying to persuade The Times to write plain English, and it was assumed that Allen was brought in to promote this campaign ... He tried. The results depressed him. In those days plain English was under suspicion at The Times. Many stories read as if written by a Henry James imitator with a bad hangover. Incomprehensible English was accepted as evidence of the honest, if inarticulate, reporter; plain English bothered people.

In his spare time, Drury wrote the novel which would become 1959's Advise and Consent. Drury later wrote a memorandum for his archives at the Hoover Institution in which he gives a full account of how the book came to be written and published. Baker was one of the first people to read the manuscript and describes his initial reluctance and then reaction:

What lies I would be compelled to tell poor Allen ... The box weighed slightly less than a ton. The manuscript inside was typed not very well on long, legal-size paper. I took it home, ate, fixed a drink, sat down and with a heavy heart reached into the box for a fistful of manuscript. Good Lord! You couldn't put the thing down! I read half the book that night and finished it next day. My wife finished close behind, and the sight of her suppressing a tear at one point confirmed my hunch.

The novel uses several incidents from Drury's fifteen years in Washington as pegs for the story, about a controversial nominee for Secretary of State. Addressing the suggestion that the book was a roman à clef, Drury wrote a very sharply worded preface which was only published in the new edition:

You will have to take the writer's word for it, because it is true. There are people and events in this book as in any that are akin to people and events in reality, but they are not the people and events of reality. Such resemblances as they do bear are transmuted through the observations and perceptions and understandings of the author into something far beyond and basically far different from the originals in the cases where originals can be argued to exist.

The novel spent 102 weeks on The New York Times Best Seller list. It won the Pulitzer Prize for Fiction in 1960. It was adapted into a well-received Broadway play by Loring Mandel, who is known for a highly successful career writing for television. Otto Preminger directed an acclaimed 1962 film starring Henry Fonda. In 2009, Scott Simon of NPR wrote in The Wall Street Journal, "Fifty years after its publication and astounding success ... Allen Drury's novel remains the definitive Washington tale." When it was republished, ABC News White House correspondent Jonathan Karl wrote for The Wall Street Journal that it offers "a compelling portrait of American social and political history and even today is well worth reading."

With the success of Advise and Consent, Drury left The New York Times. He became a political correspondent for Reader's Digest, but wrote very little for it. From then on, his only major publications were his books. He followed Advise and Consent with several sequels. A Shade of Difference (1962) is set a year after Advise and Consent, and uses the United Nations as a backdrop for portraying racial tensions in the American South and in Africa. Drury then turned his attention to the next presidential election after those events with Capable of Honor (1966) and Preserve and Protect (1968). Preserve and Protect had a cliffhanger ending—an assassination in which the victim is not identified. He then wrote two alternative finales based on two different outcomes of the assassination: Come Nineveh, Come Tyre (1973) and The Promise of Joy (1975). The last two books are set in the middle of a full international crisis.

In 1971, Drury published The Throne of Saturn, a political/science fiction novel about the first attempt at sending a crewed mission to Mars in competition with a similar Soviet effort. With the historical novel A God Against the Gods (1976) and its sequel Return to Thebes, Drury explored the reign and fall of Pharaoh Akhenaten of ancient Egypt. The novels are based on extensive reading about the Amarna Period and, in the introduction to A God Against the Gods, he thanks at length the greatest Egyptologist of the time, Cyril Aldred, for his guidance on research. He disagreed with Aldred's view that Akhenaten's religious innovations were accepted by the supplanted religious authorities. Drury wrote, "I am afraid my own view, conditioned by some years as a political correspondent, is much more cynical concerning the lengths to which human beings, of whatever era, will go in order to get, and keep, power."

After the Egypt novels, Drury returned to Washington in a succession of novels that were only tenuously related. Anna Hastings (1977) is more a novel about journalism than politics. He returned to the Senate in 1979 with Mark Coffin, U.S.S., which was followed by the two-part The Hill of Summer (1981) and The Roads of Earth (1984), though the four books are not a series. Drury also wrote stand-alone novels, Decision (1983) about the Supreme Court, and Pentagon (1986) and A Thing of State (1995) about the State Department. His career ended with the trilogy of books following the lives of fictional members of his Stanford graduating class: Toward What Bright Glory? (1994), Into What Far Harbor?(1997), and Public Men (1998). John J. Miller wrote that readers are "able to mark through Washington's major institutions with Drury and his novels ... Television producers who want to develop a show to compete with Netflix's House of Cards would do well to look to Drury."

Advise and Consent was out of print for almost 15 years and it ranked #27 on the 2013 BookFinder.com list of the Top 100 Most Searched for Out of Print Books before WordFire Press reissued it in paperback and e-book format in February 2014. The WordFire edition includes never-before-published essays about the book written by Drury himself, new appendices, and remembrances by Drury's heirs and literary executors Kenneth and Kevin Killiany. WordFire also released Advise and Consent's five sequels, and other novels. WordFire is projected to ultimately bring out about 20 of Drury's novels.

== Personal life and death ==
Drury, whose "passions were reading and travel…was an intensely private man, who never married, and lived quietly." In one of the White House audiotapes, Richard Nixon in conversation with H.R. Haldeman and John Ehrlichman stated, "Allen Drury is a homosexual."

Drury lived in Tiburon, California, from 1964 until his death. He completed his 20th novel, Public Men, just two weeks before his death. He died of cardiac arrest on September 2, 1998, his 80th birthday, at St. Mary's Medical Center in San Francisco, California.

== Awards and honors ==
- 1960 - Pulitzer Prize for Fiction
- 1967 - Golden Plate Award of the American Academy of Achievement

== Bibliography ==
=== Novels ===
==== Advise and Consent series ====
- Advise and Consent (1959)
- A Shade of Difference (1962)
- Capable of Honor (1966)
- Preserve and Protect (1968)
- Come Nineveh, Come Tyre (1973)
- The Promise of Joy (1975)

Romance

- That Summer (1963)

==== Space program ====
- The Throne of Saturn (1971)

==== Ancient Egypt ====
- A God Against the Gods (1976)
- Return to Thebes (1977)

==== Other political novels ====
- Anna Hastings (1977)
- Mark Coffin, U.S.S. (1979)
- The Hill of Summer (1981)
- Decision (1983)
- The Roads of Earth (1984)
- Pentagon (1986)
- A Thing of State (1995)

==== University series ====
- Toward What Bright Glory? (1990)
- Into What Far Harbor? (1993)
- Public Men (1998)

=== Short stories ===
- "Something" (The Magazine of Fantasy & Science Fiction, October 1960)

=== Non-fiction ===
- A Senate Journal (1963)
- Three Kids in a Cart (1965)
- A Very Strange Society (1967)
- Courage and Hesitation (1972)
- Egypt: The Eternal Smile (1980)
