= Advise and Consent =

1959 novel by Allen Drury

- First edition
- Author: Allen Drury
- Language: English
- Series: Advise and Consent
- Genre: Political novel
- Published: August 11, 1959
- Publisher: Doubleday
- Publication place: United States
- Media type: Print (hardback & paperback) & Audio Book (Cassette)
- Pages: 616 pages
- ISBN: 0-385-05419-X
- Followed by: A Shade of Difference

Advise and Consent is a 1959 political novel by American novelist Allen Drury that explores the United States Senate confirmation of controversial Secretary of State nominee Robert Leffingwell, whose promotion is endangered due to growing evidence that the nominee had been a member of the Communist Party. The chief characters' responses to the evidence, and their efforts to spread or suppress it, form the basis of the novel.

The novel spent 102 weeks on The New York Times Best Seller list, won the Pulitzer Prize for Fiction in 1960 and was adapted into a successful 1962 film starring Henry Fonda. It was followed by Drury's A Shade of Difference in 1962, and four additional sequels.

== Background ==
The novel's title comes from the United States Constitution's Article II, Sec. 2, cl. 2, which provides that the President of the United States "shall nominate, and by and with the Advice and Consent of the Senate, shall appoint Ambassadors, other public Ministers and Consuls, Judges of the Supreme Court, and all other Officers of the United States . . . ."

Drury believed most Americans were naive about the dangers of the Soviet-led communist threat to undermine the government of the United States:

Drury believed that the Soviet Union led an international totalitarian communist movement whose ultimate goal was world domination and that communists were willing to achieve that goal by whatever moral, immoral, or amoral means worked, including propaganda, lies, subversion, intimidation, infiltration, betrayal, and violence. A Drury thesis was that American liberalism contributed to communism's incremental success in its war against American democratic capitalism.

Advise and Consent is a fictional account of the nomination of a prominent liberal, Robert Leffingwell, to the cabinet position of Secretary of State during the height of the Cold War. It is said that the story is based on Drury's first-hand insight into the personalities and political practices of the late-1950s including the 1954 episode wherein Senators Styles Bridges and Herman Welker threatened to publicize a homosexual in Senator Lester Hunt's family if Hunt did not resign from the Senate.

In fact, the website of the U.S. Senate states:

Based on Drury's observations, one may guess who the author based his fictional senators on: Alben Barkley may be the dashing majority leader; Robert Taft might be the minority leader; Kenneth McKellar may be the southern senator; the overzealous Senator Fred Van Ackerman might be a caricature of Joseph McCarthy; and the tragic Brigham Anderson, who kills himself in his Senate office, reminds us of Senator Lester Hunt of Wyoming, who took his life in the Russell Building in 1954. The president and vice president strongly resemble President Franklin D. Roosevelt and Vice President Harry Truman. The entire incident could be loosely based on the Chambers-Hiss case.

However, the book is not meant to be a roman à clef, and it does not purport to disguise a true story. Drury considered his fictional senators and others as composites, and wove them through successive books. The author was not interested in profiling any one individual but in capturing the whole gallery of stock characters that Washington had seen and would be seeing again.

Several sources agree that character Robert Leffingwell, the novel's nominee for Secretary of State, represents Alger Hiss.

Addressing the suggestion that the book was a roman à clef, Drury wrote a very sharply worded preface which was only published in the new edition:

You will have to take the writer's word for it, because it is true. There are people and events in this book as in any that are akin to people and events in reality, but they are not the people and events of reality. Such resemblances as they do bear are transmuted through the observations and perceptions and understandings of the author into something far beyond and basically far different from the originals in the cases were originals can be argued to exist.

== Plot summary ==
The U.S. president decides to replace his Secretary of State to promote rapprochement with the Soviet Union. Nominee Robert Leffingwell, a darling of liberals, is viewed by many conservative senators as an appeaser. Others, including the pivotal character of Senator Seabright (Seab) Cooley of South Carolina, have serious doubts about Leffingwell's character. The book tells the story of an up-and-down nomination process that most people fully expect to result in a quick approval of the controversial nominee.

But Cooley is not so easily defeated. He uncovers a minor bureaucrat named Herbert Gelman who testifies that twenty years earlier then-University of Chicago instructor Leffingwell invited Gelman to join a small Communist cell that included a fellow traveler who went by the pseudonym James Morton. After outright lies under oath and vigorous cross examination by Leffingwell, Gelman is thoroughly discredited and deemed an unfit witness by the subcommittee and its charismatic chairman Utah Senator Brigham (Brig) Anderson. The subcommittee is ready to approve the nominee.

At this crucial moment in the story, the tenacious Senator Cooley dissects Gelman's testimony and discovers a way to identify James Morton. Cooley maneuvers Morton into confessing the truth of Gelman's assertions to Senator Anderson who subsequently re-opens the subcommittee's hearings, thus enraging the President. When the President's attempts to buy Anderson's cooperation fail he places enormous pressure on Majority Leader Robert Munson to entice Anderson into compliance. In a moment of great weakness that Munson will regret the rest of his life, Munson provides the President a photograph, acquired quite innocently by Munson, that betrays Anderson's brief wartime homosexual liaison.

Armed with the blackmail instrument he needs, the president ignores Anderson's proof of Leffingwell's treachery and plots to use the photo to gain Anderson's silence. The president plants the photo with leftist Senator Fred Van Ackerman, thinking he will never need to use it. But the President has underestimated Van Ackerman's treachery and misjudged Anderson's reaction should the truth come out. After a series of circumstances involving Anderson's secret being revealed to his wife, the Washington press corps, and several senators, Anderson kills himself. Anderson's death turns the majority of the Senate against the president and the majority leader. Anderson's suicide and the exposure of the truth about Leffingwell's lies regarding his communist past set in motion a chain reaction that ends several careers and ultimately rejects Leffingwell as a nominee to become Secretary of State.

The final one hundred pages of the book contain several "teases" by the author making it clear there is a sequel to come (Drury wrote five more books in his series), but Advise and Consent effectively ends with the overwhelming vote to reject Leffingwell. The segue to the next book in the series is the death of the president (heart attack) and the elevation of Vice President Harley Hudson.

== Reception ==
Saturday Review said of Advise and Consent in August 1959, concerning novels on politics in Washington, that "It may be a long time before a better one comes along." Roger Kaplan of Policy Review wrote in 1999 that the novel "in many ways invented a genre in fiction…. The use of a racy intrigue, if possible involving both sex and foreign policy, is what characterizes the contemporary form. Forty years on, Advise and Consent is the only book of this genre that a literary-minded person really ought to read." U.S. Senator Richard L. Neuberger of Oregon reviewed the novel for The New York Times in 1959, writing that "rarely has a political tale been told with such vivid realism" and calling the book "one of the finest and most gripping political novels of our era." Conversely, Pamela Hansford Johnson of the New Statesman called Advise and Consent "politically repellent and artistically null with a steady hysterical undertone."

The novel spent 102 weeks on The New York Times Best Seller list. In 1960, the Pulitzer Prize committee recommended that the award for fiction be given to Saul Bellow's Henderson the Rain King, but the board overrode that recommendation and awarded it to Advise and Consent.

In 2009, Scott Simon wrote in The Wall Street Journal, "Fifty years after its publication and astounding success ... Allen Drury's novel remains the definitive Washington tale." He wrote of Drury that "the conservative Washington novelist was more progressive than Hollywood liberals," noting that the character of Brigham Anderson, the young senator hiding a secret wartime homosexual tryst, is "candid and unapologetic" about his affair, and even calling him "Drury's most appealing character". Assessing Drury's body of work in 1999, Erik Tarloff suggested in The New York Times that "homosexuality does appear to be the only minority status to which Drury seems inclined to accord much sympathy." Frank Rich wrote in The New York Times in 2005:

For a public official to be identified as gay in the Washington of the 50s and 60s meant not only career suicide but also potentially actual suicide. Yet Drury, a staunchly anti-Communist conservative of his time, regarded the character as sympathetic, not a villain. The senator's gay affair, he wrote, was "purely personal and harmed no one else."

Writing for The Wall Street Journal in 2014, Jonathan Karl called Advise and Consent "the last great novel set in Washington". He called the characters "complicated and multi-dimensional, with principled convictions and plausible personal weaknesses."

Advise and Consent had been out of print for almost 15 years and ranked #27 on the 2013 BookFinder.com list of the Top 100 Most Searched for Out of Print Books before WordFire Press reissued it in paperback and e-book format in February 2014. The WordFire edition includes never-before-published essays about the book written by Drury himself, new appendices, and remembrances by Drury's heirs and literary executors Kenneth and Kevin Killiany. WordFire also released Advise and Consent's five sequels.

== Adaptations ==
Drury's novel was adapted by Loring Mandel into the 1960 Broadway play Advise and Consent, directed by Franklin Schaffner and starring Richard Kiley, Ed Begley, Henry Jones and Chester Morris. The play ran successfully on Broadway at the Cort Theatre from November 17, 1960, to May 20, 1961. The production was followed by a national company, starring Farley Granger.

The novel was also adapted into the 1962 film Advise & Consent, directed by Otto Preminger and starring Walter Pidgeon and Henry Fonda. Preminger was nominated for a Palme d'Or at the Cannes Film Festival, and Burgess Meredith won the National Board of Review award for Best Supporting Actor for his role. Charles Laughton was also nominated for a British Academy Film Award for Best Foreign Actor. LGBT film historian Vito Russo noted that Advise & Consent contained the first official portrayal of a gay bar in film.

== See also ==
- Politics in fiction
- Whittaker Chambers
- House Un-American Activities Committee
- Lavender Scare
