= Kim Stanley Robinson bibliography =

This is a bibliography of American science fiction author Kim Stanley Robinson.

== Works ==
=== Series ===
==== Three Californias ====
1. The Wild Shore (1984)
2. The Gold Coast (1988)
3. Pacific Edge (1990)

==== The Mars trilogy ====
1. Red Mars (1992) – Colonization
2. Green Mars (1993) – Terraforming
3. Blue Mars (1996) – Long-term results
4. The Martians (1999) – Short stories

==== Science in the Capital series ====
1. Forty Signs of Rain (2004)
2. Fifty Degrees Below (2005)
3. Sixty Days and Counting (2007)

Green Earth (2015) • collected and condensed omnibus edition

=== Novels ===
- Icehenge (1984)
- The Memory of Whiteness (1985)
- A Short, Sharp Shock (1990) (short novel)
- Antarctica (1997)
- The Years of Rice and Salt (2002)
- Galileo's Dream (2009)
- 2312 (2012)
- Shaman: A Novel of the Ice Age (2013)
- Aurora (2015)
- New York 2140 (2017)
- Red Moon (2018)
- The Ministry for the Future (October 2020)

=== Short story collections ===
- The Planet on the Table (1986)
  - Venice Drowned (Universe 11, 1981)
  - Mercurial (Universe 15, 1985)
  - Ridge Running (F&SF 1984)
  - The Disguise (Orbit 19, 1977) Originally published in Orbit 19, 1977, ed. Damon Knight, ISBN 0-06012-431-8.
  - The Lucky Strike (Universe 14, 1984) Originally published in Universe 14, 1984, ed. Terry Carr, ISBN 0-385-19134-0. (nominated for Hugo Award for Best Novelette, Nebula Award for Best Novelette) (frequently anthologized, as in Alternative Histories, 1986, ed. Charles G. Waugh, Martin H. Greenberg, ISBN 0-8240-8659-7, There Won't Be War, 1991, ed. Harry Harrison, Bruce McAllister, ISBN 0-812-51941-8)
  - Coming Back to Dixieland (Orbit 18, 1976)
  - Stone Eggs (Universe 13, 1983) Originally published in Universe 13, ed. Terry Carr, ISBN 0-385-18288-0.
  - Black Air (F&SF 1983)
- Escape from Kathmandu (1989)
  - "Escape from Kathmandu" Originally published in Isaac Asimov's Science Fiction Magazine, September 1986. (nominated for Hugo Award for Best Novella, Nebula Award for Best Novella) (subsequently anthologized)
  - "Mother Goddess Of The World" Originally published in Isaac Asimov's Science Fiction Magazine, October 1987. (nominated for Hugo Award for Best Novella) (subsequently anthologized)
  - "The True Nature of Shangri-La" Appeared in Asimov's Science Fiction, December 1989.
  - "The Kingdom Underground"
- Remaking History (1991)
  - "A History of the Twentieth Century, with Illustrations" (in: Vinland the Dream) Originally published in Isaac Asimov's Science Fiction Magazine, April 1991, revised for Remaking History. (subsequently anthologized: The Year's Best Science Fiction: Ninth Annual Collection, 1992, ed. Gardner Dozois, ISBN 0-312-07891-9; Best New SF 6, 1992, ed. Gardner Dozois, ISBN 1-85487-131-5; The Giant Book of Fantastic SF, 1995, ed. Gardner Dozois, ISBN 1-85487-607-4; The Savage Humanists, 2008, ed. Fiona Kelleghan, ISBN 978-0-88995-425-0.)* Down and Out in the Year 2000 (1992)
  - "Before I Wake" (in Remaking History) Originally published in Interzone #27, 1989; Isaac Asimov's Science Fiction Magazine, April 1990) (nominated for Nebula Award for Best Short Story)
  - "Glacier" (in Remaking History) Originally published in Isaac Asimov's Science Fiction Magazine, September 1988. (subsequently anthologized)
  - "Remaking History" (in Remaking History and Vinland the Dream) Originally published in Other Edens II, 1988, ed. Robert Holdstock, Christopher Evans, ISBN 0-04-440154-X; then Isaac Asimov's Science Fiction Magazine, March 1989; and What Might Have Been? Volume 1: Alternate Empires, edited by Gregory Benford and Martin H. Greenberg, 1989, ISBN 0-553-27845-2. (nominated for Hugo Award for Best Short Story but withdrawn as ineligible)
  - "The Part of Us That Loves" (in Remaking History) Originally published in Full Spectrum 2, 1989, ed. Lou Aronica, Shawna McCarthy, Amy Stout, Pat LoBrutto, ISBN 0-385-26019-9.
  - "The Return from Rainbow Bridge" (in Remaking History) Originally published in The Magazine of Fantasy and Science Fiction, August 1987.
  - "The Translator" (in Remaking History) Originally published in Universe 1, 1990, ed. Robert Silverberg, Karen Haber, ISBN 0-385-26771-1.
  - "Vinland the Dream" (in Remaking History, later in Vinland the Dream) Originally published in Asimov's Science Fiction, November 1991. (nominated for the Nebula Award for Best Short Story) (frequently anthologized)
  - "Zürich" (in Remaking History) Originally appeared in The Magazine of Fantasy and Science Fiction, March 1990.
- Vinland the Dream (2001)
  - "A Sensitive Dependence on Initial Conditions" (in Vinland the Dream) Originally published in Author's Choice Monthly #20, Pulphouse Publishing, May 1991.
  - "Black Air" (in Vinland the Dream) Originally published in The Magazine of Fantasy and Science Fiction, March 1983. (won 1984 World Fantasy Award, 1984 Science Fiction Chronicle Award; nominated for Nebula Award for Best Novelette) (subsequently anthologized)
  - "Coming Back to Dixieland" (in Vinland the Dream) Originally published in Orbit 18, 1976.
  - "Mercurial" (in Vinland the Dream) Originally published in Universe 15, 1985, ed. Terry Carr, ISBN 0-385-19890-6. Later in Future Crimes, 2003, ed. Jack Dann, Gardner Dozois, ISBN 0-441-01118-7.
  - "Muir on Shasta" (in Vinland the Dream) Originally published in A Sensitive Dependence on Initial Conditions, Author's Choice Monthly #20, Pulphouse Publishing, 1991.
  - "Ridge Running" (in Vinland the Dream) Originally published in The Magazine of Fantasy and Science Fiction, January 1984. (nominated for Hugo Award for Best Short Story)
  - "Venice Drowned" (in Vinland the Dream) Originally published in Universe 11, 1981, ed. Terry Carr, ISBN 0-385-17226-5. (nominated for the Nebula Award for Best Short Story)
- The Best of Kim Stanley Robinson (2010)
  - "The Timpanist of the Berlin Philharmonic, 1942" (in The Best of Kim Stanley Robinson)

=== Short stories ===
- "A Martian Childhood" – Asimov's Science Fiction, February 1994.
- "A Transect" – The Magazine of Fantasy & Science Fiction, May 1986. (anthologized: Future Earths: Under African Skies, 1993, ed. Gardner Dozois, Mike Resnick, ISBN 0-88677-544-2)
- "Down and Out in the Year 2000" – Originally published in Isaac Asimov's Science Fiction Magazine, April 1986. (subsequently anthologized)
- "Festival Night" (from Red Mars) In: Nebula Awards 29, 1995, ed. Pamela Sargent, ISBN 0-15-600119-5.
- "From 2312 (excerpt)" – Lightspeed Magazine, May 2012.
- "How Science Saved the World" – Nature, 6 January 2000. Also published under the title: "Review: Science in the Third Millennium", which appeared in Envisioning the Future: Science Fiction and the Next Millennium, 2003, ed. Marleen S. Barr, ISBN 0-8195-6652-7. This is a facetious review of two fictional books.
- "In Pierson's Orchestra" – Orbit 18, 1976, ed. Damon Knight, ISBN 0-06-012433-4.
- "Me in a Mirror" – Foundation – The International Review of Science Fiction, #38 Winter 1986/87, 1987, ed. Edward James.
- "On the North Pole of Pluto" – After some reworking, this novella became the third part of Icehenge; also in Orbit 21, 1980, ed. Damon Knight, ISBN 0-06-012426-1.
- "Our Town" – Originally published in Omni, November 1986; later in Lightspeed Magazine, April 2012.
- "Primate in Forest" – Future Washington, 2005, ed. Ernest Lilley, ISBN 0-9621725-4-5. Excerpt from Chapter One of Fifty Degrees Below.
- "Prometheus Unbound, At Last" – Nature, 11 August 2005.
- "Red Mars" – Interzone, #63 September 1992.
- "Sacred Space" – I'm With the Bears, 2011, ed. Mark Martin, ISBN 978-1-84467-744-3. This excerpt is from chapter 6 of the novel Sixty Days and Counting.
- "The Blind Geometer" – Originally published as a limited edition by Cheap Street Press in 1986, ISBN 0-941826-13-9, then Isaac Asimov's Science Fiction Magazine, August 1987. (subsequently anthologized, as in The Mammoth Book of Modern Science Fiction: Short Novels of the 1980s, 1993, ed. Martin H. Greenberg, Isaac Asimov, Charles G. Waugh, ISBN 0-88184-959-6) (won the 1988 Nebula Award for Best Novella; nominated for the 1988 Hugo Award for Best Novella)
- "The Lunatics" – Originally published in Terry's Universe, 1988, ed. Beth Meacham, ISBN 0-312-93058-5. (frequently anthologized)
- "The Memorial" – In the Field of Fire, 1987, ed. Jack Dann, Jeanne Van Buren Dann, ISBN 0-312-93008-9.
- "The Thing Itself" – Clarion SF, 1977, ed. Kate Wilhelm, ISBN 0-425-03293-0.
- "To Leave a Mark" – The Magazine of Fantasy and Science Fiction, November 1982. (nominated for the Hugo Award for Best Novella) Later incorporated as the first part of Icehenge
- "Green Mars" (in The Martians) Originally published in Isaac Asimov's Science Fiction Magazine, September 1985. (nominated for Hugo Award for Best Novella, Nebula Award for Best Novella) (subsequently anthologized)

=== Nonfiction ===
- Robinson, Kim Stanley (1989). The Novels Of Philip K. Dick (Dissertation) (Reprint ed.). UMI Research Press. ISBN 9780835720144.
- State of the World 2013: Is Sustainability Still Possible? published by WorldWatch Institute (2013). Wrote chapter "is it too late?"
- The High Sierra: A Love Story (2022)
- Glover, Laurie, ed. (2017). Naming Mt. Thoreau. Artemesia Press. p. 167. ISBN 9780939716371.
- Robinson, Kim Stanley (February 21, 2023). "Paying Ourselves To Decarbonize". Noema Magazine. Berggruen Institute.

=== As editor ===
- Future Primitive: The New Ecotopias (1994) Edited and wrote introduction of the anthology.
- Nebula Awards Showcase 2002 (2002)
- In the Sierra: Mountain Writing by Kenneth Rexroth (2012), ISBN 9780811219020
- Green Planets: Ecology and Science Fiction (2014, Wesleyan University Press) with Marquette University professor Gerry Canavan. Co-edited collection of scholarly essays on the relationship between ecological science, environmentalist politics, and science fiction.
