= Utopian and dystopian fiction =

Genres of literature that explore social and political structures

Utopian and dystopian fiction are subgenres of speculative fiction that explore extreme forms of social and political structures.

- A utopia is a setting that agrees with the author's ethos, having various attributes of another reality intended to appeal to readers.
- A dystopia offers the opposite: the portrayal of a setting that completely disagrees with the author's ethos.

Some novels depict both types of society to more directly contrast their properties. Both utopias and dystopias are commonly found in science fiction and other types of speculative fiction.

Utopian literature is of two basic types. Some describe imagined societies of the future to be desired or simply predicted. Others propose immediate practical action by envisioning the founding of new communities of an "ideal" character. These might be said to describe community projects and their sentiment overlaps with those of the garden city or New Towns movements.

More than 400 utopian works in the English language were published prior to the year 1900, with more than a thousand others appearing during the 20th century. This increase is partially associated with the rise in popularity of science fiction and young adult fiction more generally, but also larger scale social change that brought awareness of larger societal or global issues, such as technology, climate change, and growing human population. Some of these trends have created distinct subgenres such as climate fiction, young adult dystopian novels, and feminist dystopian novels.

== Utopian fiction in general ==
Utopian Literature sets itself aside as a literature form of utopian thought and desire. Its characteristics can be described as the thought of a better or ideal society compared to current society, these ideas being formed into a literary medium, the overall concept of utopian ideas encourages the reader to act towards bettering their current society or moves them to understand and recognize current issues critically, and that utopian thought emerges from the desire for a better life and society.

The word utopia was first used in direct context by Thomas More in his 1516 work Utopia. The word utopia resembles both the Greek words outopos ("no place"), and eutopos ("good place").

=== Examples ===
Thomas More's 1516 book Utopia, written in Latin, sets out a vision of an ideal society. As the title suggests, the work presents an ambiguous and ironic projection of the ideal state. The whimsical nature of the text can be confirmed by the narrator of Utopia's second book, Raphael Hythloday. The Greek root of the name "Hythloday" suggests an 'expert in nonsense.' Thomas More's idea of a utopia stems from contemporary economic and societal issues in Tudor England. More directly confronts the issues of rising population, oppressive landlords, and civilians turning to crime through Hythloday's perspective in Book I of his novel.

An earlier example of a Utopian work from classical antiquity is Plato's Republic, in which he outlines what he sees as the ideal society and its political system. Later, Tommaso Campanella was influenced by Plato's work and wrote The City of the Sun (1623), which describes a modern utopian society built on equality. Other examples include Samuel Johnson's The History of Rasselas, Prince of Abissinia (1759) and Samuel Butler's Erewhon (1872), which uses an anagram of "nowhere" as its title. This, like much of utopian literature, can be seen as satire; Butler inverts illness and crime, with punishment for the former and treatment for the latter.

One example of the utopian genre's meaning and purpose is described in Fredric Jameson's Archeologies of the Future (2005), which addresses many utopian varieties defined by their program or impulse. He describes the fundamental dynamic of utopias lying in "identity and difference." Jameson states that the core of utopian thought and politics lies in an imagined system that is thoroughly different from an original, real one.

Another early work of fiction with both utopian and satirical elements is The Description of a New World, Called the Blazing World (1666) by English philosopher and writer Margaret Cavendish. This is an early example of what was later called science fiction writing. What degree Cavendish's work can be called feminist is debatable. Rachel Trubowitz describes A Blazing World as a feminist utopia because it challenges traditional gender roles. However, Sujata Iyengar says that Cavendish’s work reinforces ideas of racial and feminine inferiority.

Vanessa Rapatz focused on Cavendish's impact and argued that her writings provide a context for understanding contemporary feminist authors such as Toni Morrison and Octavia Butler.

Because Cavendish broke the boundaries of conventional female writing and behavior, many people dismissed her utopian vision. Samuel Pepys described Cavendish as being a “mad, conceited” and “ridiculous woman”. Virginia Woolf wrote that her work lacked discipline and “her ideas [were] poured out higgledy-piggledy in torrents of prose, poetry, and philosophy.”

== Dystopian fiction ==
A dystopia is a society characterized by a focus on that which is contrary to the author's ethos, such as mass poverty, public mistrust and suspicion, a police state or oppression. Most authors of dystopian fiction explore at least one reason why things are that way, often as an analogy for similar issues in the real world. Dystopian literature serves to "provide fresh perspectives on problematic social and political practices that might otherwise be taken for granted or considered natural and inevitable". Some dystopias claim to be utopias. Samuel Butler's Erewhon can be seen as a dystopia because of the way sick people are punished as criminals while thieves are "cured" in hospitals, which the inhabitants of Erewhon see as natural and right, i.e., utopian (as mocked in Voltaire's Candide).

Dystopias usually extrapolate elements of contemporary society, and thus can be read as political warnings.

Eschatological literature is a form of literature that can go hand-in-hand with dystopian literature. This is a form of literature that specifically focuses on some form of apocalypse, such as the collapse of a society, the end of an era of human history, or the end of the world itself.

=== Examples ===
The 1921 novel We by Yevgeny Zamyatin portrays a post-apocalyptic future in which society is entirely based on logic and modeled after mechanical systems. George Orwell was influenced by We when he wrote Nineteen Eighty-Four (published in 1949), a novel about Oceania, a state at perpetual war, its population controlled through propaganda. Big Brother and the daily Two Minutes Hate set the tone for an all-pervasive self-censorship. Aldous Huxley's 1932 novel Brave New World started as a parody of utopian fiction, and projected into the year 2540 industrial and social changes he perceived in 1931, leading to industrial success by a coercively persuaded population divided into five castes. Karin Boye's 1940 novel Kallocain is set in a totalitarian world state where a drug is used to control the individual's thoughts.

Anthony Burgess' 1962 novel A Clockwork Orange is set in a future England that has a subculture of extreme youth violence, and details the protagonist's experiences with the state intent on changing his character at its whim. Margaret Atwood's The Handmaid's Tale (1985) describes a future United States governed by a totalitarian theocracy, where women have no rights, and Stephen King's The Long Walk (1979) describes a similar totalitarian scenario, but depicting the participation of teenage boys in a deadly contest. Examples of young-adult dystopian fiction include (notably all published after 2000) The Hunger Games series by Suzanne Collins, the Divergent series by Veronica Roth, The Power of Five series by Anthony Horowitz, The Maze Runner series by James Dashner, and the Earthseed series by Octavia E. Butler. Video games often include dystopias as well; notable examples include the Fallout series, BioShock, the later games of the Half-Life series, ARC Raiders, Cyberpunk 2077, and the Wolfenstein series. It can also be depicted in narrative music storytelling, such as the story of Circle in Melanie Martinez's 2026 album HADES, Halsey's 2021 album If I Can't Have Love, I Want Power, or Ethel Cain's 2022 album Preacher's Daughter.

== History of dystopian fiction ==
The history of dystopian literature can be traced back to the reaction to the French Revolution of 1789 and the prospect that mob rule would produce dictatorship. Until the late 20th century, it was usually anti-collectivist. Dystopian fiction emerged to counteract utopian fiction. Its early history is traced in Gregory Claeys' Dystopia: A Natural History (Oxford University Press, 2017).

The beginning of technological dystopian fiction can be traced back to E. M. Forster's "The Machine Stops" (1909). M Keith Booker states that "The Machine Stops," We (1921) and Brave New World (1932) are "the great defining texts of the genre of dystopian fiction, both in [the] vividness of their engagement with real-world social and political issues and in the scope of their critique of the societies on which they focus."

Another important figure in dystopian literature is H. G. Wells, whose work The Time Machine (1895) is also widely seen as a prototype of dystopian literature. Wells' work draws on the social structure of the 19th century, providing a critique of the British class structure at the time. Post World War II, even more dystopian fiction was produced. These works of fiction were interwoven with political commentary: the end of World War II brought about fears of an impending Third World War and a consequent apocalypse.

Modern dystopian fiction draws not only on topics such as totalitarian governments and anarchism, but also pollution, global warming, climate change, health, the economy and technology. Modern dystopian themes are common in the young adult (YA) genre of literature.

Canadian theorist S.D. Chrostowska's 2020 novel The Eyelid evoked adulation from critics, one of whom said it belonged at the top of any list of utopian-dystopian fiction masterworks. Its unique blend of narrative and social critique stages a dialectical confrontation between dystopian and utopian currents in contemporary capitalist societies, typical of the novel of ideas.

== Subgenres ==
=== Combinations ===
Many works combine elements of both utopias and dystopias. Typically, an observer from our world will journey to another place or time and see one society the author considers ideal and another representing the worst possible outcome. Usually, the point is that our choices may lead to a better or worse potential future world. Ursula K. Le Guin's Always Coming Home fulfills this model, as does Marge Piercy's Woman on the Edge of Time. In Starhawk's The Fifth Sacred Thing there is no time-travelling observer. However, her ideal society is invaded by a neighbouring power embodying evil repression. In Aldous Huxley's Island, in many ways a counterpoint to his better-known Brave New World, the fusion of the best parts of Buddhist philosophy and Western technology is threatened by the "invasion" of oil companies. As another example, in the "Unwanteds" series by Lisa McMann, a paradox occurs where the outcasts from a complete dystopia are treated to absolute utopia. They believe that those who were privileged in said dystopia were the unlucky ones.

In another literary model, the imagined society journeys between elements of utopia and dystopia over the course of the novel or film. The Giver by Lois Lowry begins in a seemingly perfect society without pain, conflict, or inequality. The world is described as a utopia. However, as the book progresses, the dark aspects of this world emerge: strict control over individuals' lives, emotional suppression, lack of personal choice and erasure of memories and agency. These reveal the society's dystopian core, where stability is maintained through dehumanization and the denial of fundamental human freedoms. As such, The Giver is ultimately considered a dystopian novel rather than a utopian one.

Jonathan Swift's Gulliver's Travels is also sometimes linked with both utopian and dystopian literatures, because it shares the general preoccupation with ideas of good and bad societies. Of the countries Lemuel Gulliver visits, Brobdingnag and Country of the Houyhnhnms approach a utopia; the others have significant dystopian aspects.

=== Ecotopian fiction ===
In ecotopian fiction, the author posits either a utopian or dystopian world revolving around environmental conservation or destruction. Danny Bloom coined the term "cli-fi" in 2006, with a Twitter boost from Margaret Atwood in 2011, to cover climate change-related fiction, but the theme has existed for decades. Novels dealing with overpopulation, such as Harry Harrison's Make Room! Make Room! (made into movie Soylent Green), were popular in the 1970s, reflecting widespread concerns with the effects of overpopulation on the environment and on individuals' quality of life. The novel Nature's End by Whitley Strieber and James Kunetka (1986) posits a future in which overpopulation, pollution, climate change, and resulting superstorms, have led to a popular mass-suicide political movement. Some other examples of ecological dystopias are depictions of Earth in the films Wall-E and Avatar.

While eco-dystopias are more common, a small number of works depicting what might be called eco-utopia, or eco-utopian trends, have also been influential. These include Ernest Callenbach's Ecotopia, an important 20th century example of this genre. Another are Kim Stanley Robinson's works. He has written several books dealing with environmental themes, including the Mars trilogy. Most notably, however, his Three Californias Trilogy contrasted an eco-dystopia with an eco-utopia and a sort of middling-future. Robinson has also edited an anthology of short ecotopian fiction, called Future Primitive: The New Ecotopias. Another impactful piece of Robinson's is New York 2140 which focuses on a society dealing with the aftermath after a major flooding event, and can be seen through both a utopian and dystopian lens.

There are a few dystopias that have an "anti-ecological" theme. These are often characterized by a government that is overprotective of nature or a society that has lost most modern technology and struggles for survival. A fine example of this is the novel Riddley Walker by Russell Hoban.

=== Feminist utopias ===
Another subgenre is feminist utopias and the overlapping category of feminist science fiction. According to the author Sally Miller Gearhart, "A feminist utopian novel is one which a. contrasts the present with an envisioned idealized society (separated from the present by time or space), b. offers a comprehensive critique of present values/conditions, c. sees men or male institutions as a major cause of present social ills, d. presents women as not only at least the equals of men but also as the sole arbiters of their reproductive functions."

Utopias have explored the ramification of gender being either a societal construct or a hard-wired imperative. In Mary Gentle's Golden Witchbreed, gender is not chosen until maturity, and gender has no bearing on social roles. In contrast, Doris Lessing's The Marriages Between Zones Three, Four and Five (1980) suggests that men's and women's values are inherent to the sexes and cannot be changed, making a compromise between them essential. In My Own Utopia (1961) by Elisabeth Mann Borgese, gender exists but is dependent upon age rather than sex — genderless children mature into women, some of whom eventually become men. Marge Piercy's novel Woman on the Edge of Time keeps human biology, but removes pregnancy and childbirth from the gender equation by resorting to assisted reproductive technology while allowing both women and men the nurturing experience of breastfeeding.

Utopic single-gender worlds or single-sex societies have long been one of the primary ways to explore implications of gender and gender-differences. One solution to gender oppression or social issues in feminist utopian fiction is to remove men, either showing isolated all-female societies as in Charlotte Perkins Gilman's Herland, or societies where men have died out or been replaced, as in Joanna Russ's A Few Things I Know About Whileaway, where "the poisonous binary gender" has died off. In speculative fiction, female-only worlds have been imagined to come about by the action of disease that wipes out men, along with the development of a technological or mystical method that allows female parthenogenetic reproduction. The resulting society is often shown to be utopian by feminist writers. Many influential feminist utopias of this sort were written in the 1970s; the most often studied examples include Joanna Russ's The Female Man and Suzy McKee Charnas's The Holdfast Chronicles. Such worlds have been portrayed most often by lesbian or feminist authors; their use of female-only worlds allows the exploration of female independence and freedom from patriarchy. The societies may not necessarily be lesbian, or sexual at all — Herland (1915) by Charlotte Perkins Gilman is a famous early example of a sexless society. Charlene Ball writes in Women's Studies Encyclopedia that use of speculative fiction to explore gender roles has been more common in the United States than in Europe and elsewhere.

Utopias imagined by male authors have generally included equality between sexes rather than separation.

== Cultural impact ==
Étienne Cabet's work Travels in Icaria caused a group of followers, the Icarians, to leave France in 1848, and travel to the United States to start a series of utopian settlements in Texas, Illinois, Iowa, California, and elsewhere. These groups lived in communal settings and lasted until 1898.

During the first decades of the 20th century, utopian science fiction literature was very popular in Russia due to more citizens wanting to engage with fantasies of the future (as well as the fact that it was a new, up-and-coming genre of literature). During the Cold War, utopian science fiction became popular among Soviet leaders. As well, many Soviet Union citizens became dependent on this type of literature because it provided an escape from the real world, which was not ideal at the time. Utopian science fiction allowed readers to fantasize about how it would be to live in a "perfect" world.

== See also ==
- The City of the Sun
- List of dystopian literature
- List of dystopian comics
- List of dystopian films
- List of dystopian TV programs
- List of utopian literature
- Social science fiction
- Utopian language

== Bibliography ==
- Applebaum, Robert. Literature and Utopian Politics in Seventeenth-Century England. Cambridge, Cambridge University Press, 2002.
- Bartkowski, Frances. Feminist Utopias. Lincoln, NE, University of Nebraska Press, 1991.
- Booker, M. Keith. The Dystopian Impulse in Modern Literature. Westport, CT, Greenwood Press, 1994.
- Booker, M. Keith. Dystopian Literature: A Theory and Research Guide. Westport, CT, Greenwood Press, 1994.
- Claeys, Gregory. Dystopia: A Natural History. Oxford, Oxford University Press, 2017.
- Ferns, Chris. Narrating Utopia: Ideology, Gender, Form in Utopian Literature. Liverpool, Liverpool University Press, 1999.
- Gerber, Richard. Utopian Fantasy. London, Routledge & Kegan Paul, 1955.
- Gottlieb, Erika. Dystopian Fiction East and West: Universe of Terror and Trial. Montreal, McGill-Queen's Press, 2001.
- Haschak, Paul G. Utopian/Dystopian Literature. Metuchen, NJ, Scarecrow Press, 1994.
- Iyengar, Sujata. “Royalist, Romancist, Racialist: Rank, Gender, and Race in the Science and Fiction of Margaret Cavendish.” ELH, vol. 69, no. 3, 2002, pp. 649–72. (651)
- Jameson, Fredric. Archaeologies of the future: the Desire Called Utopia and Other Science Fictions. London, Verso, 2005.
- Kessler, Carol Farley. Daring to Dream: Utopian Fiction by United States Women Before 1950. Syracuse, NY, Syracuse University Press, 1995.
- Leslie, Marina. “Gender, Genre and the Utopian Body in Margaret Cavendish’s Blazing World.” Utopian Studies, vol. 7, no. 1, 1996, pp. 6–24.
- Mohr, Dunja M. Worlds Apart: Dualism and Transgression in Contemporary Female Dystopias. Jefferson, NC, McFarland, 2005.
- Rapatz, Vanessa L. “‘A World of her own Invention’: Teaching Margaret Cavendish's Blazing World in the Early British Literature Survey and Beyond”, ABO: Interactive Journal for Women in the Arts, vol. 14, no. 1, 2024.
- Sargent, Lyman Tower (November 1976). "Themes in Utopian Fiction in English Before Wells". Science Fiction Studies. 3 (3): 275–82. doi:10.1525/sfs.3.3.0275.
- Szweykowski, Zygmunt. Twórczość Bolesława Prusa [The Art of Bolesław Prus], 2nd ed., Warsaw, Państwowy Instytut Wydawniczy, 1972.
- Tod, Ian, and Michael Wheeler. Utopia. London, Orbis, 1978.
- Trubowitz, Rachel. “The Reenchantment of Utopia and the Female Monarchical Self: Margaret Cavendish’s Blazing World.” Tulsa Studies in Women’s Literature, vol. 11, no. 2, 1992, pp. 229–45.
- Wills, Matthew. “‘Mad Meg,’ the Poet-Duchess of 17th Century England.” Daily JSTOR, 10 Mar. 2019, https://daily.jstor.org/mad-meg-the-poet-duchess-of-17th-century-england/.
