= The Ministry for the Future =

Science fiction novel by Kim Stanley Robinson

- First edition
- Author: Kim Stanley Robinson
- Cover artist: Lauren Panepinto
- Language: English
- Genre: Science fiction
- Publisher: Orbit Books
- Publication date: October 2020
- Publication place: United States
- Media type: Print, e-book, audiobook
- Pages: 576
- ISBN: 978-0-316-30013-1
- OCLC: 1147927281

The Ministry for the Future is a climate fiction novel by American science fiction writer Kim Stanley Robinson, published in 2020. Set in the near future, the novel follows a subsidiary body, established under the Paris Agreement, whose mission is to act as an advocate for the world's future generations of citizens as if their rights were as valid as the present generation's. While the ministry pursues various ambitious projects, the effects of climate change are determined to be the most consequential. The plot primarily follows Mary Murphy, the head of the titular Ministry for the Future, and Frank May, an American aid worker traumatized by experiencing a deadly heat wave in India. Many chapters are devoted to other (mostly anonymous) characters' accounts of future events, as well as their ideas about ecology, economics, and other subjects.

With its emphasis on scientific accuracy and nonfiction descriptions of history and social science, the novel is classified as hard science fiction. It also belongs to the growing body of climate fiction. Robinson has previously written other climate fiction novels, such as 2312 and New York 2140. The Ministry for the Future also includes elements of utopian fiction, as it portrays society addressing a problem, and elements of horror fiction, as climate change threatens characters.

== Background ==
At the time of the novel's publication, American science fiction author Kim Stanley Robinson was 68 years old and living in Davis, California. He had previously written 20 novels, and he had received the Robert A. Heinlein Award and the Arthur C. Clarke Foundation's Award for Imagination in Service to Society for his body of work. Before The Ministry for the Future, his most recent novel had been Red Moon, published two years earlier. With The Ministry for the Future, Robinson was seeking to return to the climate fiction genre that he had previously written in with 2312, New York 2140, and the Science in the Capital series (Forty Signs of Rain, Fifty Degrees Below, Sixty Days and Counting).

His previous climate fiction had approached the topic from an aftermath point of view; with the new novel, he sought to write with the near future as the starting point, and with existing real-world technologies, economics, and societies—and then to push the narrative further into the future. This approach is reflected in the book's dedication to Fredric Jameson, Robinson's doctoral supervisor, who wrote that "It is easier to imagine the end of the world than to imagine the end of capitalism." Whereas many science-fiction and climate fiction stories illustrate future societies as end products of a future history, Robinson was seeking to write about a bridge time to a future when the effects of climate change are mitigated and the Holocene extinction is halted.

== Plot ==
The book follows an international organization named the Ministry for the Future in its mission to act as an advocate for the world's future generations of citizens as if their rights were as valid as the present generation's. Beginning in 2025, the organization, established as a subsidiary body under the Paris Agreement and based in Zurich, is led by protagonist Mary Murphy, a former foreign minister of Ireland and a composite character based on diplomats Mary Robinson, Christiana Figueres, and Laurence Tubiana. Climate change is established as a threat that compromises the safety and prosperity of the future. While the narrative includes chapters of nonfiction history and descriptions of events from the perspectives of other characters and objects, the plot follows Murphy as she seeks to convince central banks of the threats to currency and market stability posed by the effects of climate change. Specifically, a coordinated global round of unconventional quantitative easing through the issuance of a complementary currency, called the carbon coin, to be issued in proportion to the mass of carbon that is mitigated. The monetary concept, called carbon quantitative easing, is based on a specific real-life policy proposal, called a Global Carbon Reward, and an academic paper referred to throughout the book as the "Chen Paper". In Antarctica, various countries cooperate in a geoengineering project to drill to the bottom of glaciers and pump meltwater up to slow basal sliding while the program incentivizes multiple other simultaneous efforts like carbon farming, sail-driven container ships for cargo and airships for personal transport.

== Style and genre ==
The novel comprises 106 short chapters. The chapters mostly alternate between the two protagonists: Mary, as she leads the Ministry, and Frank, as he seeks to act on his frustration from surviving an extreme heat wave. However, numerous chapters are presented from the point of view of other characters or nameless narrators. The style also shifts from chapter to chapter, from third-person narration by the two protagonists to first-person presentation by others (including object narratives by a photon and a carbon atom). Various chapters also take the forms of meeting notes, an encyclopedia article, a prose poem, a Socratic seminar, and explanatory essays, among other writing styles. Describing this presentation, Robinson stated that the standard structure of the novel did not work for the topic and story that he wanted to write. He was seeking to write with an "international scope," with characters who provide explanations for how or why institutions and systems work as they do, and how they might change. His editor at Orbit Books, Tim Holman, encouraged Robinson to try an alternative approach that resulted in various modes of writing, principally unnamed characters who provide eyewitness accounts, but potentially also the forms of an essay, drama, dialogue, radio interview, riddle, etc. In an interview with Amy Brady, editor-in-chief of the Chicago Review of Books, Robinson described his approach as heteroglossia or polyvocal, in which form follows function.

By subsuming shorter, more dramatic forms of storytelling into a larger, meaningful narrative architecture, Robinson leaves little chance for soothing denialisms and the various narrative closures that pervade climate fiction more generally.

— J.R. Burgmann, Australian Book Review

Climate change and the Holocene extinction loom in the background, as various characters seek either to stop it or fall victim to it; the reviewer in the Pittsburgh Post-Gazette described the narrative as "a good old-fashioned monster story." It begins with an inciting incident, and it follows characters who interact with privileged groups unwilling to change their habits to confront the monster. This type of metaphorical monster—specifically climate change in the novel—was compared with those of "Babadook (grief), Rosemary's Baby (motherhood), Get Out (racism), and Frankenstein (humanity)."

The novel belongs to the genres of hard science fiction, climate literature, and utopian fiction. As hard science fiction, the novel emphasizes scientific accuracy through its portrayal of technology and climate science. The exploration and extrapolation of the effects of human-caused climate change made the novel part of a growing body of climate fiction, while numerous reviewers classified the novel as utopian fiction because it portrays a society changing (in ways) to address its short-comings. However, nonfiction environmental writer Bill McKibben wrote in The New York Review of Books that the novel "is not utopian, it's anti-dystopian, realist to its core." The novel's approach was compared with that of Edward Bellamy's Looking Backward 2000–1887—a future history that bridges the gap between modern times and a future utopia.

== Publication and reception ==
The book was published by Orbit Books, a speculative fiction imprint of the Hachette Book Group. The novel was released in hardcover and e-book formats on 6 October 2020, and was released in trade paperback in October 2021. An audiobook version, narrated by a cast that includes Jennifer Fitzgerald and Fajer Al-Kaisi, was published by the Hachette Audio imprint; it was given an Earphones Award by AudioFile magazine for the audiobook's presentation. The cover, designed by Lauren Panepinto with photographs by Trevillion Images, was revealed on the Newsweek magazine website on 7 April 2020; it was described by Robinson as "...suggesting something like the feel of glimpsing the light at the end of the tunnel—the possibility of getting into a new open field of possibilities."

Author Jonathan Lethem called Ministry for the Future “the best science-fiction nonfiction novel I’ve ever read”. Former president Barack Obama named it as one of his favorite books of 2020.

The French translation of the novel, published as Le Ministère du futur (Bragelonne, 2023), won the foreign novel award from Grand Prix de l’Imaginaire in 2024.

=== Critical reception ===
Reviewers commented primarily on the novel's relevance to the year's events, such as the 2020 Atlantic hurricane season (the most active season to date); megafires in Australia and the Western United States; and the COVID-19 pandemic. In that context, reviewer Mark Yon concluded, this book is "the novel we need." Reviewers also commented on the book's meticulous and well-communicated research. The first chapter, which describes a heat wave that reaches a lethal wet-bulb temperature—Robinson's counterpoint to people who advocate adaptation—was described by reviewers as gut-wrenching, as well as of Robinson's most stunning and grimmest writing. However, the reviewers for Kirkus Reviews magazine and The Nerd Daily newspaper found that the book's "information dumping" took away from character development and narrative drive. The review in the New Zealand online newspaper The Spinoff stated, "The book is many things, but it is never boring ... indulges wild tonal shifts" and called it a "relentless, pacy, utterly absorbing story of our near future." In Francis Fukuyama's view, the novel is "ludicrously unrealistic" and "Robinson posits the most optimistic possible political developments at every turn."

== Awards and honors ==
Year	Award	Result	Ref.
2021	BSFA Award for Best Novel	Nominated	
2021	Dragon Awards (Best Sci-fi Novel)	Nominated	
2021	Locus Awards (Best Sci-fi Novel)	Nominated (4th)	
2021	Kitschies (Best Novel "Red Tentacle")	Nominated	

== See also ==
- Intergenerational equity
