= Forty Signs of Rain =

2004 hard science fiction novel by Kim Stanley Robinson

- First edition (UK)
- Author: Kim Stanley Robinson
- Cover artist: Dominic Harman
- Language: English
- Series: Science in the Capital
- Genre: Hard science fiction
- Publisher: HarperCollins (UK); Bantam Spectra (US)
- Publication date: January 2004
- Publication place: United States
- Media type: Print (Hardback, Paperback)
- Pages: 356
- ISBN: 978-0-007-14888-2
- OCLC: 53325030
- LC Class: PS3568.O2893 F67 2004
- Followed by: Fifty Degrees Below

Forty Signs of Rain (2004) is the first novel in the hard science fiction trilogy Science in the Capital by Kim Stanley Robinson. The following two novels are Fifty Degrees Below (2005) and Sixty Days and Counting (2007).

== Plot introduction ==
The novel focuses on the effects of global warming in the early decades of the 21st century. The characters are mostly scientists—conducting research on biotechnology, assisting members of the government, or doing administrative tasks at the US National Science Foundation (NSF). The novel also features several Buddhist monks who work for the embassy of the fictional island nation of Khembalung.

== Characters ==
Anna Quibler – a hard-scientist administrator in charge of the Bioinformatics division of the NSF; part of her job entails distributing grant proposals from scientists and science students nationwide to program directors under her supervision. She befriends the Khembalis.

Charlie Quibler – Anna's husband, a stay-at-home dad for their young sons. He is the science policy advisor to Senator Phil Chase, and he works tirelessly to introduce Congessional bills for climate change mitigation.

Frank Vanderwal – a biomathematician at University of California, San Diego with an interest in sociobiology, working for a year at the NSF; he oversees the review of grant proposals in biology; a rock climbing hobbyist and co-founder of Torrey Pines Generique (a biotechnology start-up).

Drepung – a Tibetan Buddhist monk, he identifies himself to Anna as the assistant and translator for Rudra Cakrin; later in the trilogy, he is revealed to be the spiritual leader of the Khembalese group.

Rudra Cakrin – the ambassador from Khembalung to the United States; a Tibetan in exile, he pretends to be the spiritual leader of the Khembalese but is actually Drepung's assistant.

Leo Mulhouse – the chief science researcher at Torrey Pines Generique, working on gene therapy.

Senator Phil Chase – a Democratic Senator from California, he understands the need for both policy change and realpolitik; a character in the novel Antarctica.

Diane Chang – the Director of the National Science Foundation.

== Plot ==
Frank Vanderwal, having spent a year at the National Science Foundation (NSF) in Washington, D.C., is impatient with what he sees as its passivity and its reluctance to demand serious political change in the face of severe climate change. He keeps an eye on environmental triggers such as climate change in the Arctic and thermohaline circulation. Though he likes his colleague, Anna Quibler, and much of her work, he misses his hometown, San Diego. An athletic man, he frequently goes climbing and canyoneering when he can. Interested in sociobiology, he views both his own behavior and others' as that of primates who evolved on the African savannahs and who are not entirely biologically prepared to live in the urban environment. He considers behaviors in ordinary situations, such as traffic, and in extraordinary situations in light of the game theory decision making strategy known as the prisoner's dilemma.

Anna's husband, Charlie Quibler, feels as urgently as Frank does about environmental issues. He juggles the raising of their two young sons, Nick and Joe, with encouraging Senator Phil Chase and Chase's chief of staff, Roy, to badger the conservatives in Congress about passing legislation to convert the United States to a non-anthropogenic global warming society, to construct carbon sinks, and to work for international cooperation for amelioration of climate change. (It is clear that the President, never named, is George W. Bush; we are told that his predecessor was Bill Clinton; he views climate change as a "downer" and refers to it as "climactic [not climatic] terrorism.")

Anna, a devoted wife and mother, is, in Frank's view, something of an ultra-rationalist; Charlie is amused by her constant search for quantifiable measurements in all parts of her life. She discovers the new Khembali embassy in the NSF building and invites Drepung and Rudra Cakrin to lunch. When they all get along well, and she becomes interested in their concern about the threat of rising sea levels to Khembalung, their small island nation in the Bay of Bengal, she invites them to come for dinner when they all have time.

Leo Mulhouse, a science director at Torrey Pines Generique, a biotechnology startup company in San Diego, searches for therapies for various human diseases. He is alarmed to learn that his boss, Derek, has spent $51 million to buy another company which might (and might not) work in tandem; Torrey Pines has not yet been able to show any profits, which puts them at risk for sale to investors who might care to purchase or even quash any patentable techniques they come up with. He turns out to be right when the company is sold some weeks later. Leo has another worry: his house, located on a cliff over the Pacific, is threatened by coastal erosion.

Frank, eager to return to California, writes an angry denunciation of NSF and leaves it in the in-box of the director, Diane Chang, for her to find the next morning. That evening, he unexpectedly has a romantic encounter with a beautiful woman in a Washington Metro subway elevator when the elevator is stuck between floors. They are released, and she disappears before he can learn her name. Invited to the Quiblers' house to meet the Khembalis, he tells Anna about the woman; she is pleased to find him so excited and talkative, and urges him to track her down.

Frank, thinking that now he might want to stay in D.C., regrets the angry letter about the NSF and decides to break into Chang's office and remove it. Using his climbing skills, he enters the NSF building from the roof, descends through the atrium skylight, manages his way down a large mobile, and gets into Chang's office. The letter, however, is gone; Chang often comes into her office at all hours. Nervous and upset, he returns home. The next day, Chang tells him to prepare a talk for the NSF Board of Directors. Frank realizes that Chang has read his letter, but he tells the directors honestly how he feels about the NSF and urges them to become more daring and more politically active. During the discussion, he sees that many of them feel as he does. Frank accepts an invitation to remain at NSF for another year.

A catastrophic "trigger event" occurs when what Robinson calls the Hyperniño creates an enormous storm on the West Coast. The sandstone cliffs of California begin shelving off into the Pacific Ocean. Leo, now unemployed, witnesses this at his Leucadia, California home and, in the rainstorm, joins members of the United States Geological Survey and an army of volunteers in attempting to shore up the cliffs.

Meanwhile, another enormous storm in the Atlantic creates a flood in Washington. Charlie is trapped at the Capitol Building with other co-workers. They watch as the rain comes down for hours and the National Mall is drowned. "Constitution Avenue looked like the Grand Canal in Venice." The Potomac River and Chesapeake Bay overflow, flooding the city:

The Lincoln Memorial, despite its pedestal mound, appeared to be flooded up to about Lincoln's feet. Across the Potomac the water was going to inundate the lower levels of Arlington National Cemetery. Reagan Airport was completely gone.

When the National Zoo faces rising waters, the Khembalis help the staff to unlock the cages and free the animals. Drepung and his associates arrange for two tigers to be brought to the Quiblers' house, where one is kept in a zoo truck and the other is put into their cellar.

Frank, joining other volunteers in deploying sandbags out in the storm, is amazed to see his mystery woman pass in a boat up the river. Spotting the boat's number, he gets her phone number and calls her; she promises that, after a while, she will call him back.

After days, the storm and the floodwaters subside. Charlie, finally arranging a lift home from the office, says to Senator Chase, "Are you going to do something about global warming now?"

== Themes ==
- The need to tackle climate change at the levels of national policy and international relations
- The clash between the scientific consensus on climate change and bureaucratic climate change denial
- Current sea level rise
- Human behavioral ecology and evolutionary psychology
- The prisoner's dilemma and morality
- The value and limitations of peer review

== Reception ==
Rick Kleffel began a review with a strong statement:

Embarrassingly enough, what's all too often missing from science fiction is science itself. ... Robinson offers a fine example of science fiction as fiction about the process of science... Bureaucrats, lobbyists and working-stiff scientists are revealed in all their self-conflicted glory. For the reader, it's an exciting glimpse of science entwined with a frightening and convincing speculative plot. Forty Signs of Rain may be the smartest and best disaster novel you'll read.

Robinson zooms into the heads of his scientific and bureaucratic characters with laser-like clarity. Frank constantly observes the people around him as if they were primates, roaming the African plains... he sees the world as a scientist even when he's just standing in an elevator. But he's also a complex and conflicted character. ... Robinson is working on a wide canvas here, so some reader patience for final results will be required. But within the confines of this first entry in the series, you get a nice sense of toe-tapping tension as careers collide with cash and bounce back hopelessly, helplessly in the face of a nearly religious faith in the efficacy of capitalism.

... The practice of science is the real subject here. Robinson shows a once-honored form of human activity now kowtowing to crass capitalism, and he does it with the kind of detail and finesse that makes the whole picture captivating. This is no simple axe grinding, but rather an honest re-assessment of where we are going with the way things currently work. Robinson is not afraid to tackle current politics in his scientific fiction, and here's where the science really works in favor of the narrative and the conclusions that Robinson reaches.

In his review for Fantasy & Science Fiction magazine, Robert K. J. Killheffer wrote that "Forty Signs of Rain is a fascinating depiction of the workings of science and politics, and an urgent call for us to pull our heads from the sand and confront the threat of climate change. We should listen." The reviewer for SF Site magazine was also interested in the scientific themes, calling the novel "one of the most chilling" and "one of the most important and thought provoking books" she had read that year: "Greed is the key, here, and it's a tragedy. ... This book is a wake up call of sorts, to scientists in the United States especially, to go out and fight for what they believe in."

Kirkus Reviews magazine was critical, commenting that "As stiff and hard SF as they were, the Mars books succeeded through the sheer chutzpah of their epic insight. This one feels like the ho-hum preview for a run-of-the-mill end-of-the-world story." Publishers Weekly magazine said that "Robinson's tale lacks the drama and excitement of such other novels dealing with global climate change as Bruce Sterling's Heavy Weather and John Barnes' Mother of Storms, but his portrayal of how actual scientists would deal with this disaster-in-the-making is utterly convincing. Robinson clearly cares deeply about our planet's future, and he makes the reader care as well."

Lara Apps wrote that "The result is a slow-building, educational and entertaining introduction to what promises to be a provocative and exciting trilogy." Jerry Wright, admitting that Robinson's "politics leave me cold," concluded that "Robinson seems to focus on details of the characters' lives, their work, and their thoughts, but behind it all, the specter of global warming looms. Soon there is a change here, a change there, until all the imbalances combine to bring about a catastrophe that who knows, might even wake up the DC politicians. KSR outlines quite a plausible scenario, and the science behind the troubles seem accurate."

== Awards and nominations ==
- Forty Signs of Rain was nominated for both the British Science Fiction Award in 2004 and the Locus Award in 2005.

== Release details ==
- 2004, United Kingdom, HarperCollins Publishers Ltd. ISBN 0-00-714886-0, publication date January 2004, hardback
- 2004, United States of America, Spectra ISBN 0-553-80311-5, publication date June 2004, hardback
- 2005, United Kingdom, HarperCollins Publishers Ltd. ISBN 0-00-714888-7, publication date February 2005, paperback
- 2005, United States of America, Spectra ISBN 0-553-58580-0, publication date July 2005, paperback
