= Fifty Degrees Below =

2005 novel by Kim Stanley Robinson

- First edition (UK)
- Author: Kim Stanley Robinson
- Cover artist: Dominic Harman
- Language: English
- Series: Science in the Capital
- Genre: Hard science fiction novel
- Publisher: HarperCollins (UK); Bantam Spectra (US)
- Publication date: 2005
- Publication place: United States
- Media type: Print (Paperback)
- ISBN: 0-553-80312-3
- OCLC: 60454714
- Dewey Decimal: 813/.54 22
- LC Class: PS3568.O2893 F54 2005
- Preceded by: Forty Signs of Rain
- Followed by: Sixty Days and Counting

Fifty Degrees Below (2005) is the second novel in the hard science fiction trilogy Science in the Capital by Kim Stanley Robinson. The novel directly follows the events of Forty Signs of Rain; it focuses more on the character Frank Vanderwal and his decision to remain at the National Science Foundation (NSF), following the earlier novel’s superstorm and devastating flood of Washington, D.C.

== Major themes ==
The book and series look primarily at possible mitigation and adaptation efforts that could be undertaken to combat the dangers of anthropogenic climate change; however, the plot focuses mainly on an international effort to restart the stalled Gulf Stream. The emphasis falls on the scientific approach by the NSF, particularly its efforts to work with the United States government, the United Nations, and other international bodies.

The character of Frank Vanderwal is followed closely through about a year and a half of his life. Alongside his work at the NSF, his story arc focuses primarily on his attempt at a Paleolithic lifestyle, which includes emphasizing certain behaviors that the human brain has adapted to enjoy, such as sleeping outdoors and hunting. Vanderwal also meets a woman who introduces him to the potential and danger of complete electronic surveillance.

== Reception ==
Publishers Weekly magazine praised the novel, saying that "this ecological disaster tale is guaranteed to anger political and economic conservatives of every stripe, but it provides perhaps the most realistic portrayal ever created of the environmental changes that are already occurring on our planet. It should be required reading for anyone concerned about our world's future." Kirkus Reviews magazine was mixed in itsreview saying that "though it is fast-paced and exciting, it does occasionally strain believability. Where the author succeeds is in his fascinating speculation about our ecological future, and the steps we could be taking to repair the world for future generations. First-rate ecological speculation, but a second-rate thriller." Reviewing for Science News magazine, Janet Raloff said that "overall, Robinson's engaging book is a fast-moving, upbeat romp driven by science." The novel was nominated for a Locus Award in 2006.
