= United Nations Transitional Authority =

United Nations Transitional Authority may refer to:

- United Nations Transitional Authority in Cambodia, a peacekeeping operation 1992–93
- United Nations Transitional Authority, a fictional organisation in the Mars trilogy by Kim Stanley Robinson
