= Antarctica (novel) =

Novel by Kim Stanley Robinson

- Author: Kim Stanley Robinson
- Language: English
- Genre: Science fiction
- Publisher: HarperVoyager (formerly Voyager)
- Publication date: 1997
- Publication place: United States
- Media type: Print (Hardback & Paperback)
- Pages: 414
- ISBN: 0-002-25359-3
- OCLC: 37828247

Antarctica (1997) is a science fiction novel by American writer Kim Stanley Robinson. It deals with a variety of characters living at or visiting an Antarctic research station. The novel incorporates many of Robinson's frequent themes, including scientific process and the importance of environmental protection.

== Overview ==
Most of the story centers on McMurdo Station, the largest settlement in Antarctica, which is run as a scientific research station by the United States. Robinson's characteristic multi-protagonist style is used here to show many aspects of polar life; the viewpoints presented include those of the following characters:

- X, an idealistic young man working as a General Field Assistant at McMurdo
- Val, an increasingly embittered trek guide
- Wade Norton, who works for the California Senator Phil Chase (Wade and Phil also appear in the Science in the Capital trilogy).

In addition to McMurdo, the story involves the Amundsen–Scott South Pole Station, the Shackleton Glacier, the McMurdo Dry Valleys and a South American drilling platform near Roberts Massif.

== Themes ==
Antarctica involves many of the ideas that Robinson uses elsewhere; as in the Mars trilogy, significant emphasis is placed on the importance of living sustainably and the issues of existing in a hostile environment. The significance of Antarctica as a "continent for science" is contrasted with the need to provide a decent environment also for the support staff essential in a place so marginal. Other recurring themes include rock-climbing, physical athleticism, the process and ideology of science, exploitation of natural resources, and the formation of cooperative and anarchic social systems.

The novel was heavily influenced by Robinson's 1995 stay in Antarctica through the National Science Foundation's Antarctic Artists and Writers Program. The novel was nominated for a Locus Award in 1998. Although the novel was thoroughly researched and generally realistic, some reviews noted that the book was slowed down in places by heavy technical and historic detail.
