= Icehenge =

1984 novel by Kim Stanley Robinson

- First edition of Icehenge, with cover art by Mark Weber, published by Ace Books as a mass-market paperback
- Author: Kim Stanley Robinson
- Cover artist: Mark Weber
- Language: English
- Genre: Science fiction
- Publisher: Ace Books
- Publication date: 1984
- Publication place: United States
- Media type: Print (Paperback)
- Pages: 262
- ISBN: 0-441-35854-3
- OCLC: 11191345

Icehenge is a science fiction novel by American author Kim Stanley Robinson, published in 1984.

Though published almost ten years before Robinson's Mars trilogy, and taking place in a different fictional future, Icehenge contains elements that also appear in the trilogy; these elements include extreme human longevity, Martian political revolution, historical revisionism, and shifts in perspective among primary characters.

== Plot ==
Icehenge is set at three distinct time periods, and told from the perspective of three different characters.

The first narrative is the diary of an engineer caught up in a Martian political revolution in 2248. Effectively kidnapped aboard a mutinous Martian spaceship, she provides assistance to the revolutionaries in their quest for interstellar travel, but ultimately chooses not to travel with them but to return to the doomed revolution on Mars.

The second narrative is told from the perspective of an archaeologist three centuries later. He is involved in a project investigating the failed revolution, and during this finds the engineer's diary buried near the remains of a ruined city. At the same time, a mysterious monument is found at the north pole of Pluto, tying up with a passing mention in the engineer's diary.

In the final narrative, the great-grandson of the archaeologist visits the monument on Pluto, a ring of standing slabs of ice. He is investigating the possibility that both the diary and the monument were planted by a reclusive and wealthy businesswoman who lives in the orbit of Saturn.

== Development history ==
The first part of Icehenge was originally published as the novella "To Leave a Mark" in The Magazine of Fantasy & Science Fiction (November 1982). The third part of the novel was originally published as the novella "On the North Pole of Pluto" in the anthology Orbit 18 (1980), edited by Damon Knight. While Robinson was enrolled in author Ursula K. Le Guin's writing workshop at University of California, San Diego in the spring of 1977, he gave her the novella in rough form to read and edit. In the novel's third section, views of Saturn from the space station visited by the narrator were inspired by images of Saturn taken during Voyager probe flybys in 1980–1981.

=== Publication history ===
- 1984, United States, Ace Books ISBN 0-441-35854-3, publication date October 1984, paperback
- 1985, United Kingdom, Futura Orbit ISBN 0-7088-8166-1, publication date December 1985, paperback
- 1986, United Kingdom, MacDonald ISBN 0-356-12402-9, publication date October 1986, hardback
- 1986, France, Denoël ISBN 2-207-30425-6, publication date September 1986, paperback
- 1986, Italy, Editrice Nord ISBN 88-429-0171-7, publication date 1986, paperback
- 1987, West Germany, Bastei-Lübbe ISBN 3-404-24092-8, publication date 1987, paperback
- 1990, United States, Tor Books ISBN 0-8125-0267-1, publication date September 1990, paperback
- 1997, United Kingdom, Voyager ISBN 0-00-648255-4, publication date 15 September 1997, paperback
- 1997, Croatia, Zagrebačka naklada ISBN 953-6234-26-2, publication date 1997, paperback
- 1997, Bulgaria, Лира Принт ISBN 954-8610-18-3, publication date 1997, paperback
- 1998, United States, Tor Orb ISBN 0-312-86609-7, publication date July 1998, paperback
- 2001, People's Republic of China, 漓江出版社 ISBN 7-5407-2610-5, publication date 2001, paperback
- 2003, France, Gallimard ISBN 2-07-031304-2, publication date December 2003, paperback
- 2004, Spain, Minotauro ISBN 84-450-7495-4, publication date 9 March 2004, paperback
- 2009, United Kingdom, Voyager ISBN 978-0-00-733674-6, publication date 1 August 2009, paperback
