= Sixty Days and Counting =

Novel by Kim Stanley Robinson

- First edition
- Author: Kim Stanley Robinson
- Cover artist: Dominic Harman
- Language: English
- Series: Science in the Capital
- Genre: Hard science fiction novel
- Publisher: Spectra
- Publication date: 2007
- Publication place: United States
- Media type: Print (Hardcover)
- ISBN: 978-0-553-80313-6
- OCLC: 71329881
- Dewey Decimal: 813/.54 22
- LC Class: PS3568.O2893 S59 2007
- Preceded by: Fifty Degrees Below

Sixty Days and Counting (2007) is the third novel in the hard science fiction trilogy Science in the Capital by Kim Stanley Robinson. The novel directly follows the events of Fifty Degrees Below, beginning just after the character Phil Chase is elected as President of the United States. The story follows the previous novel's deep freeze of the area surrounding Washington, D.C., and it details the remediation of the climate in the United States and around the world.

Like other novels by Robinson, Sixty Days and Counting is informed by Buddhism and Buddhist beliefs.
