= The Planet on the Table =

1986 collection of science fiction stories by Kim Stanley Robinson

- First edition cover
- Author: Kim Stanley Robinson
- Cover artist: Michael Tedesco
- Language: English
- Genre: Science fiction
- Publisher: Tor Books
- Publication date: 1986
- Publication place: United States
- Media type: Print (hardback & paperback)
- Pages: xiv + 241
- ISBN: 0-312-93595-1
- OCLC: 13693059

The Planet on the Table is a collection of science fiction stories by American writer Kim Stanley Robinson, published in hardcover by Tor Books in 1986. A British paperback edition appeared in 1987, as well as a Tor paperback reprint; a French translation was issued in 1988. The collection was republished in the 1994 Tor omnibus Remaking History and Other Stories. The collection takes its title from a poem by Wallace Stevens, which provides the book's epigraph.

One story in the collection, "Black Air", won a World Fantasy Award in 1984, and was nominated for the Hugo and Nebula Awards. Three other stories were nominated for the Hugo or Nebula Awards, one for both. Six of the eight stories held top-twenty rankings in the annual Locus polls, and The Planet on the Table itself took tenth place in the 1987 "Best Collection" rankings. The New York Times selected the collection as one of 1986's most notable books.

== Contents ==
- "Introduction"
- "Venice Drowned" (Universe 11, 1981)
- "Mercurial" (Universe 15, 1985)
- "Ridge Running" (F&SF 1984)
- "The Disguise" (Orbit 19, 1977)
- "The Lucky Strike" (Universe 14, 1984)
- "Coming Back to Dixieland" (Orbit 18, 1976)
- "Stone Eggs" (Universe 13, 1983)
- "Black Air" (F&SF 1983)

== Reception ==
New York Times reviewer Gerald Jonas praised Robinson as "a powerful and consistent science fiction voice", finding the author "at his best when he writes of people to whom the supernormal is commonplace." The Toronto Star's Douglas Barbour described Robinson as "one of the few writers to enter sci-fi during the '70s whose work continues to push the field outwards rather than retreating to the safe conventional 'escapism' of the past", declared the collection to be one that "no one interested in the field should miss."

Dave Langford reviewed The Planet on the Table for White Dwarf #94, and stated that it "displays a wide stylistic range, high points being 'The Lucky Strike' telling of a subtly different 1945 where one man flying in that B-29 over Hiroshima thought twice, and the unclassifiable 'Black Air' with its religious visions on a beaten ship of the Spanish Armada."

Orson Scott Card, although praising Robinson's language as "precise and exquisitely crafted" and describing the author "storyteller with a mercilessly clear vision of the world," faulted the stories as excessively controlled, with Robinson's accomplished technique more noticeable than his work's emotional impact.
