= The Memory of Whiteness =

1985 novel by Kim Stanley Robinson

- First edition
- Author: Kim Stanley Robinson
- Cover artist: Joe Bergeron
- Language: English
- Genre: Science fiction novel
- Publication date: September 1985
- Publication place: United States
- Pages: 351
- ISBN: 9780312934675
- OCLC: 974243997

The Memory of Whiteness is a science fiction novel by Kim Stanley Robinson, published in September 1985.

== Theme ==
The novel shares with Robinson's Mars trilogy a focus on human colonization of the Solar System; it depicts a grand tour from the outer planets toward the Sun, visiting many human colonies along the way. The different human societies on the visited planets and planetoids are depicted in detail.

== Plot summary ==
The purpose of the novel's interplanetary tour is to stage concerts by the Holywelkin Orchestra, a futuristic musical instrument played by a selected master. Readers follow the Orchestra and its entourage along with a journalist, who eventually detects a conspiracy apparently connected with a group of gray-clothed, sun-worshipping monks. The tour ends near the planet Mercury, in a solar station belonging to these "Grays", which controls the white-line energy source for the entire Solar System.

== Reception ==
David Langford reviewed The Memory of Whiteness for White Dwarf magazine (issue #76), calling it "impressive for its scope and feel of connecting the two cultures: both music and multidimensional physics sound convincing."

== Reviews ==
- Review by Faren Miller (1985) in Locus, #295 August 1985
- Review by Stuart Napier (1985) in Fantasy Review, October 1985
- Review by Don D'Ammassa (1985) in Science Fiction Chronicle, #75 December 1985
- Review by Doc Kennedy (1985) in Rod Serling's The Twilight Zone Magazine, December 1985
- Review by Tom Easton (1986) in Analog Science Fiction/Science Fact, January 1986
- Review by Andrew Andrews (1986) in Science Fiction Review, Spring 1986
- Review by Algis Budrys (1986) in The Magazine of Fantasy & Science Fiction, February 1986
- Review by Keith Soltys (1986) in Science Fiction Review, Summer 1986
- Review by Tom A. Jones (1986) in Vector 132
- Review by Pascal J. Thomas (1986) inThrust, #24, Summer 1986
- Review by Ken Lake (1987) in Paperback Inferno, #65
- Review by Paul Kincaid (1987) in Foundation, #38 Winter 1986/87
- Review [German] by Norbert Kupper (1988) in Science Fiction Times, April 1988
- Review by K. V. Bailey (1999) in Vector 206
- Review? [French] by Claude Ecken (2006) in Galaxies, #39
