= Escape from Kathmandu =

1989 novella collection by Kim Stanley Robinson

- Author: Kim Stanley Robinson
- Cover artist: Wayne Barlowe
- Language: English
- Genre: Novel
- Publisher: Tor Books
- Publication date: 1989
- Publication place: United States
- Media type: Print (hardback & paperback)
- Pages: 314 pp
- ISBN: 0-312-93196-4
- OCLC: 20265504
- Dewey Decimal: 813/.54 20
- LC Class: PS3568.O2893 E8 1989

Escape from Kathmandu is a 1989 collection of novellas by American writer Kim Stanley Robinson, about a group of American expatriates in Nepal.

== Contents ==
The novellas are:

- Escape from Kathmandu ( nominated for Nebula Award for Best Novella in 1986 and the Hugo Award for Best Novella in 1987)
- Mother Goddess of the World
- The True Nature of Shangri-La
- The Kingdom Underground

== Critical reception ==
Publishers Weekly called it an "enjoyable collection".
