= New York 2140 =

2017 climate fiction novel by Kim Stanley Robinson

- First edition
- Author: Kim Stanley Robinson
- Cover artist: Stephan Martiniere
- Language: English
- Genre: Science fiction
- Publisher: Orbit Books
- Publication date: 2017
- Publication place: United States
- Media type: Print (hardback & paperback)
- Pages: 624 pages
- ISBN: 978-0-316-26234-7

New York 2140 is a 2017 climate fiction novel by American science fiction author Kim Stanley Robinson. The novel is set in a New York City that has been flooded and altered by rising water.

== Setting ==
The novel takes place primarily in a fictional future New York City, permanently inundated by two major rises in seawater levels caused by climate change. Most of New York City is permanently underwater; however, people still live on the upper floors of buildings, much as in contemporary Venice.

Most of Manhattan south of 46th Street is flooded, and it has earned the nickname "SuperVenice". Several of the book's characters live in the MetLife Tower on 23rd Street, which the tenant association has outfitted with flood-prevention mechanisms and boat storage. Robinson chose to prominently feature the building, since it was designed to resemble the St. Mark's Campanile in Venice.

Affluent people live in newly constructed skyscrapers in Uptown Manhattan and near The Cloisters, since both locations remain above water. Denver has replaced New York as the center of American finance and culture, and much of the United States has been deliberately abandoned by humans in order to make room for wildlife. Robinson has previously addressed sea level rise directly and indirectly in his works Aurora, 2312, and the Mars trilogy.

=== Scientific accuracy ===
The book is set in a New York City suffering a 50-foot rise in sea-water. However, scientists suggest that a rise between 3 and 15 feet (0.9 and 5 meters) is more likely by 2140. A rise on that scale would probably mean that some portions of Manhattan, Brooklyn, and Queens would be flooded, but not to the extent featured in the novel. However, some estimates project sea-level rises even higher than those depicted in the novel (up to 72 feet or 22 meters) by the year 2300, if global warming increases to 5 °C (relative to pre-industrial levels). According to Robinson, the novel is set in 2140 because he wanted the setting to be recognizable, while the sea-level rise in the novel was possible but "extreme".

== Themes ==
The novel is critical of capitalism, unregulated financial systems, and market economies. Many of the city's citizens live in co-ops and rely on organizations that pool resources; affluent people live in former office buildings and newly built skyscrapers north of 125th Street and in Yonkers.

== Reception ==
Gerry Canavan, writing for the Los Angeles Review of Books, referred to the novel as a further step in Robinson's "[...] construction of a huge metatextual history of the future...distributed across overlapping but distinct and mutually irreconcilable texts".

In a 2022 article on Robinson published by The New York Times, Alexandra Alter referred to the novel as "oddly uplifting".

Ken Burns has referred to the novel as "wonderful", saying that it "...[has] disasters and climate change, but it also has sort of human adaptability, and it's really spectacular."
