= Future Primitive: The New Ecotopias =

1994 short stories collection

- First edition
- Editor: Kim Stanley Robinson
- Cover artist: Carol Russo
- Language: English
- Published: 1994 (Tor Books)
- Publication place: United States
- Media type: Hardcover
- Pages: 352
- ISBN: 978-0-312-85474-4

Future Primitive: The New Ecotopias is a 1994 collection of short stories edited by Kim Stanley Robinson. It republishes notable short works of utopian and dystopian fiction that incorporate elements of primitivism and of eco-anarchism.

== Contents ==
- An introduction by Robinson, outlining the visionary role of such fiction
- Tomorrow's Song, Gary Snyder (a poem)
- Part one: "Statements of desire"
  - Bears Discover Fire, Terry Bisson
  - In the Abode of the Snows, Pat Murphy
  - Boomer Flats, R. A. Lafferty
- Part two: "Denial of the body"
  - Hogfoot Right and Bird-Hands, Garry Kilworth
- Part three: "But what were they really like?"
  - House of Bones, Robert Silverberg
- Part four: "And might we ever be like that again?"
  - 'A Story' by John V. Marsch, Gene Wolfe
  - The Bead Woman, Rachel Pollack
  - Chocco, Ernest Callenbach
  - (excerpt from) The New World, Frederick Turner
  - Rangriver Fell, Paul Park
  - Mary Margaret Road-Grade, Howard Waldrop
- Part five: "Parables"
  - Looking Down, Carol Emshwiller
  - Newton's Sleep, Ursula K. Le Guin
  - Return, Robinson Jeffers
- Endnotes characterizing the purpose of each story in the anthology

== Reception ==
Publishers Weekly called it "a potent mixture of prose and poetry" that will "please not only science fiction aficionados but also those with interest in philosophy, archeology and environmental ethics".

== See also ==
- Apocalyptic science fiction
