= 2312 (novel) =

Novel by Kim Stanley Robinson

- First edition
- Author: Kim Stanley Robinson
- Cover artist: Kirk Benshoff
- Language: English
- Genre: Science fiction
- Publisher: Orbit
- Publication date: May 23, 2012
- Publication place: United States
- Media type: Print (hardcover and electronic book) and audio-CD
- Pages: 576
- Awards: Nebula Award for Best Novel
- ISBN: 978-0-316-09812-0

2312 is a hard science fiction novel by American writer Kim Stanley Robinson, published in 2012. It is set in the year 2312, when society has spread out across the Solar System. The novel won the 2013 Nebula Award for Best Novel.

== Plot summary ==
The novel is set in the year 2312, in the great city of Terminator on Mercury, which is built on gigantic tracks in order to constantly stay in the planet's habitable zone near the terminator. Swan Er Hong, an artist and former asteroid terrarium designer, is grieving over the sudden death of her step-grandmother, Alex, who was very influential among the inhabitants of Terminator. After the funeral procession, a conference is held among the family and the close friends of Alex, some of whom Swan has never heard of. This includes Fitz Wahram, a native of the moon Titan, and Jean Genette, a police detective who has been exiled from Mars. Following the conference, Swan goes to Io to deliver a message to another friend of Alex's, called Wang, who has designed one of the largest qubes, or quantum computers. While Swan is visiting Wang on Io, an apparent attack of some sort fails. An attack on Terminator shortly follows; a meteorite of artificial origin destroys the city's tracks, stopping the city and exposing it to sun, essentially cooking it. As Swan travels, she learns more of the mystery surrounding her grandmother's death and the destruction of her home-city of Terminator. With Wahram and Genette, Swan travels throughout the Solar System and investigates an escalating series of conspiracies.

Inspector Genette eventually discovers how the artificial meteorite that destroyed Terminator was created: someone launched a large number of smaller objects on trajectories that would eventually cause them to coalesce above Mercury, but low enough that the planet's defense system could not destroy the now large object in time. The complexity of the attack leads Genette to determine that quantum computers must have been used. Eventually the characters learn that the attack was motivated by conflicts within the Venusian government, in the course of which a number of qubes in humanoid bodies have been secretly manufactured and sent to infiltrate human society. The humanoid qubes are arrested, along with a small number of humans involved in this conspiracy, and exiled on board a generation ship leaving the solar system.

Meanwhile, Swan and Wahram become involved in restoring and rewilding the climate-change-ravaged Earth by returning thousands of species from space-based habitats to their home environments on the Earth. Swan and Wahram fall in love over the course of the novel, marrying at the end.

== Characters ==
- Swan Er Hong: an artist and former asteroid terrarium designer
- Fitz Wahram: diplomat from the moon Titan
- Jean Genette: a "small" who was a close friend to Alex
- Alex: influential and deceased scientist and diplomat; also Swan's step-grandmother
- Mqaret: a scientist and Alex's partner
- Kiran: a young Earth boy who saves Swan from trouble in his slum-like hometown; in gratitude, Swan gives him a job off-planet

== Themes ==
=== Science and technology ===
In the world of the novel, the planets Mercury, Venus, and Mars are inhabited by humans, as are the moons of Saturn and Jupiter. Humans have a presence (or are building one) on all the inhabitable surfaces (including moons and satellites) within the Solar System. Almost all the Solar System's largest asteroids have been hollowed out to form "terrariums", which include an interior artificial environment designed to mimic various biomes (or combinations of these) found on earth. Some terrariums serve as animal reserves or farms for endangered or under-produced flora and fauna. Humans take shuttles to these asteroids and use them as transportation around the system.

In the novel, scientific and technological advances—such as human enhancement, settlements on other planets, and terraforming—have opened gateways to an extraordinary future. A major innovation is qubes, which are quantum computers possessing artificial intelligence (AI), often small enough that the wearer can have one implanted into their head or attached to their body (as one might wear a watch or carry a phone). Digital AI is still in use, but it is being supplanted by the smaller and more powerful qubes.

Capitalism has generally been replaced by a planned economy that is based on the mondragon (Note: Michael Albert and Robin Hahnel are also referenced as influences, along with Francis Spufford.) (a Spanish cooperative federation) and controlled by quantum computers, but remnants of the market system persist on Earth.

=== Sex, sexuality and gender ===
Gender and sexuality in this universe are fluid and expansive, with gender and sexuality including many categories: feminine, masculine, androgynous, ambisexual, bisexual, neuter, eunuch, nonsexual, undifferentiated, gay, lesbian, queer, invert, homosexual, polymorphous, poly, labile, berdache, hijra, and two-spirit.

As part of a process for extending the human lifespan, many people exhibit intersex or "gynandromorphous" sex characteristics, including both penises and vaginas.

== Development ==
Robinson has said that the novel began with the idea of a romance between two characters from Mercury and Saturn ("mercurial" and "saturnine" in temperament, respectively), with the broader setting being developed later.

== Links to other works ==
The idea of a city that slowly moves around Mercury to avoid direct light from the Sun first appeared in Robinson's earlier novel The Memory of Whiteness, in addition to a brief mention in his Mars Trilogy. It is also briefly mentioned in his 2015 novel Aurora. There are a number of other minor links to the Mars Trilogy, though it is clear that they take place in different fictional universes--e.g., Swan's AI shares the name of John Boone's AI ("Pauline").

== Reception ==
Critical reception for 2312 has been mixed to positive. Writing in Slate, Choire Sicha praised the book as "brilliant", while the Guardian's M. John Harrison criticized its ending as "contrived". In the Los Angeles Times, Jeff VanderMeer called the novel a "treasured gift to fans of passionate storytelling", writing that its "audacity" was an asset. Jo Walton praised it as "full of big ideas and provoking thoughts." James Nicoll, however, called it a "dreadful" book, in which the "science is so terrible as to be painful to read."

The book won or was nominated for the following awards:

- won the 2013 Nebula Award for Best Novel
- was nominated for the 2013 Hugo Award for Best Novel
- was shortlisted for the 2012 BSFA Award for Best Novel
- was shortlisted for the 2013 Arthur C. Clarke Award
- was honor listed for the 2012 James Tiptree, Jr. Award
- was nominated for the 2012 Goodreads Choice Award for science fiction

== See also ==
- Space colonization § Mercury
