= Aurora (novel) =

2015 science fiction novel by Kim Stanley Robinson

- First edition
- Author: Kim Stanley Robinson
- Language: English
- Genre: Science fiction
- Publisher: Orbit
- Publication date: July 7, 2015
- Publication place: United States
- Media type: Print (hardback & paperback)
- Pages: 480
- ISBN: 9780316098106
- OCLC: 942477364

Aurora is a 2015 novel by American science fiction author Kim Stanley Robinson. The novel concerns a generation ship built in the style of a Stanford torus, traveling to Tau Ceti to start a human colony. The novel's primary narrative voice is that of the starship's artificial intelligence. Aurora was well received by critics.

== Plot ==
A generation ship is launched from Earth in 2545 at 0.1 c (i.e. traveling at 30,000 km/s or 10% the speed of light). It includes twenty-four self-contained biomes and an average population of two thousand people. One hundred sixty years and approximately seven generations later, it is beginning its deceleration into the Tau Ceti system to begin colonization of a planet's moon, an Earth analog, which has been named Aurora.

Devi, the ship's de facto chief engineer and leader, is concerned about the decaying infrastructure and biology of the ship: systems are breaking down, each generation has lower intelligence test scores than the last, and bacteria are mutating and evolving at a faster rate than humans. She tells the ship's AI, referred to simply as Ship, to keep a narrative of the voyage. After having some trouble with understanding the human concept of narrative, Ship eventually elects to follow the life of Devi's daughter Freya as a protagonist.

As a teenager, Freya travels around the ship on her Wanderjahr and learns that many of the ship's inhabitants are dissatisfied with their enclosed existence and what they perceive as a dictatorship. Movement is strictly limited for most people, reproduction is tightly controlled, and education in science and mathematics is mandatory. Freya's Wanderjahr comes to an end when she is called home as Devi grows sick from cancer and dies.

The ship arrives in the Tau Ceti system and begins to settle Aurora, a moon of Tau Ceti e. It soon becomes apparent that extraterrestrial life is present in the form of complex prions, which infect and kill some of the landing party. All except one of the remaining settlers attempts to return to the ship, and some of those remaining onboard kill them in the airlock to maintain quarantine, leading to a violent political schism throughout the ship. The ship itself, which has been moving towards self-awareness, takes physical control of the situation by lowering oxygen levels and separating warring factions, referring to itself as "the rule of law". It then reveals to the crew that there were in fact two ships originally launched for the Tau Ceti expedition, but the other was destroyed during a period of severe civil unrest, and the collective memory of that event was erased from the history records.

Under Ship's moderation, a more peaceful debate takes place between the inhabitants about what to do now that Aurora is known to be inhospitable. Unable to reach consensus, the factions agree to part ways, with those who wish to stay retaining as many resources as can be spared to pursue an unlikely attempt at terraforming the Mars-like moon Iris, while the other group, led by Freya, opts to try and return to Earth. Using raw materials in the Tau Ceti system, they refuel the ship to allow acceleration back to Earth; since they lack fuel to decelerate, they must rely on the laser propulsion system that originally launched them from the Solar System to slow them down on approach. The last remaining Aurora settler, Jochi, who remains permanently quarantined in his shuttle attached to the exterior of the ship, elects to return to Earth as well. Initially, Freya and the others who return remain in communication with those who remained in the Tau Ceti system, but much later on their voyage home this communication stops.

On the voyage back to Earth, the ship's biomes continue to deteriorate as bacteria flourish and crops fail. The humans soon face famine and experiment with an untested form of cryogenic freezing, which is largely successful. The ship's repeated entreaties to Earth to turn back on the laser propulsion system are ignored due to societal and political strife back in the Solar System, and many citizens' anger at the colonists' "cowardice". Eventually a private group funds and reactivates the laser, but the delay means the ship's speed is only reduced by a fraction of what is needed. Ship is therefore forced to decelerate by means of gravity assist between various planets, a process which takes twelve years. During this time, with the full communications data of humanity available to it, it learns more about why it was launched in the first place—simply for expansionism—and denounces its builders as "criminally negligent narcissists". The ship manages to safely drop its humans off on a pass of Earth but fails to make a final gravity slowdown past the Sun. Ship is destroyed, along with Jochi in his quarantined shuttle.

Freya and the other "starfarers" have trouble adjusting to life on Earth, especially with many Terrans hostile to them for a perceived sense of ingratitude and cowardice. At a space colonization conference, a speaker says humanity will continue to send ships into interstellar space no matter how many people fail and die, and Freya assaults him. Eventually, she joins a group of terraformers who are attempting to restore the Earth's beaches after their loss during previous centuries' sea level rise. While swimming and surfing, she begins to come to terms with life on Earth.

== Major themes ==
Major themes in Aurora include the complexities of life aboard a multigenerational starship, interpersonal psychology, artificial intelligence, human migration, environmentalism, and the feasibility of interstellar travel.

== Development history ==
In researching the novel, Robinson met with his friend Christopher McKay, an American scientist who had been advising him since Robinson's Mars Trilogy. McKay arranged lunch meetings at the NASA Ames Research Center, where Robinson posed questions to NASA employees.

== Reception ==
Aurora received positive reviews. Writing in The Guardian, Adam Roberts described it as "the best generation starship novel I have ever read". National Public Radio's Alan Cheuse praised the novel's narrative voice: "Almost the entire narrative, with all its science and all its strong characters and weak, its heroes and whiners, explorers and those fearful of settling anywhere, and all of its speculation about the nature of consciousness, comes alive in the computer's humane construction of the ship's journey." Nature published a more critical review by Gregory Benford: "Aurora seems to be a U-turn, involving unlikely plot devices.

Stephen Baxter, James Benford, and Joseph Miller wrote a detailed critique of the novel's science for the website Centauri Dreams, concluding that "while Aurora is an intriguing combination of literary, political, scientific and technical notions, and while it reflects many current speculations about the difficulty of interstellar travel, in many instances it lacks the supporting credible scientific and technical detail required to make its polemic case that human interstellar travel is impossible." For example, they noted that Aurora would be unlikely to have only a prion-like organism and nothing else, and they questioned the ability of this organism to infect humans (which causes the novel's interstellar mission to fail).
