= Red Moon (novel) =

2018 science fiction novel by Kim Stanley Robinson

- First edition (US)
- Author: Kim Stanley Robinson
- Language: English
- Genre: Science fiction
- Publisher: Orbit (US); Little, Brown (UK)
- Publication date: 2018
- Pages: 464
- ISBN: 9780316262354

Red Moon is a 2018 science fiction novel by American novelist Kim Stanley Robinson. The novel is set in China and on the Moon. It was reviewed in several US media outlets with mixed reception.

== Plot ==
In the year 2047, Fred Fredericks is sent to the Moon to deliver a quantum communications device. Upon arrival, he is nearly killed during the handover of the device, but cannot remember what happened. He is held on suspicion of murdering the official to whom he was delivering the device. A journalist helps Fredericks and the dissident leader Qi, who is due to give birth soon, escape back to Earth. They are pursued by Chinese authorities, who believe that Qi will lead a revolution of disaffected workers and displaced migrants to overthrow the Party leadership. After a series of chases and escapes, Fredericks and Qi return to the Moon, where they encounter a wealthy Chinese businessman building his own ideal colony and visit free settlers creating a lunar city outside government control. One faction of the Chinese leadership orders missile strikes on the Moon to kill Fredericks and Qi, but they receive advance warning of the attacks and flee to a remote lunar shelter, where Qi gives birth as millions of Chinese workers gather in Beijing to start the revolution.

== Reception ==
Jason Sheehan of NPR criticized the book's emphasis on exposition and digressions into discussions of the environment, politics, and orbital mechanics; he suggested that Robinson's approach was "no way to tell a story". Writing for The Guardian, Chris Beckett praised Robinson's depiction of the relationship between the characters Fredericks and Qi, calling it "a delightful and touching depiction of two people who would normally have nothing to do with each other, finding a way of getting along". The Times criticized the "great indigestible tracts of expository dialogue" and "horrible doldrum of narrative drift", but it concluded that Red Moon "confirms its author's status as a sci-fi master".
