= Three Californias Trilogy =

Book trilogy by Kim Stanley Robinson

The Three Californias Trilogy (also known as the Three Californias Triptych, Wild Shore Triptych, and the Orange County Trilogy) is a series by science fiction author Kim Stanley Robinson that depicts three possible futures of Orange County, California. The novels that make up the trilogy are, "The Wild Shore", 'The Gold Coast", and "Pacific Edge". Each novel describes the life of young people in one of the three near-future worlds; each novel begins with an exposition that tells the reader about the fictional world.

== Summaries ==
=== The Wild Shore ===
The Wild Shore was Robinson's first published novel. The Wild Shore (1984) is the story of survivors of a nuclear war. The nuclear strike consisted of 2,000–3,000 neutron bombs that were detonated in 2,000 of North America's biggest cities in 1987. Survivors have started over, forming villages and living off agriculture and sea. The theme of the first chapters is that of a quite normal pastoral science fiction, which is deconstructed in later chapters. Post-nuclear rural life is hindered from developing further by international treaties imposed by the victorious Soviets, with an unwilling Japan charged with patrolling the West Coast.

The Wild Shore won the Locus Award for Best First Novel in 1985, and it was nominated for both the Nebula and Philip K. Dick Awards in 1984. Algis Budrys described it as "a frontier novel, with rich threads of Steinbeckian populism woven into its cast of characters." Although faulting the novel's "failure to sustain the weight of its undertakings," he concluded that Wild Shore was "a remarkably powerful piece of work, still a good book, almost without doubt a harbinger of great books to come from Robinson. It is also a really interesting and good book."

=== The Gold Coast ===
In The Gold Coast (1988) the reader learns about Southern California in 2027, a dystopian extension of 1980s Los Angeles with its car-oriented culture and lifestyle: "an endless sprawl of condos, freeways, and malls." The book follows two groups of characters, connected by 27-year-old Jim McPherson and his father Dennis.

The Gold Coast was nominated for the Campbell, Locus, and British Science Fiction awards in 1989.

=== Pacific Edge ===
Pacific Edge (1990), set in the El Modena neighborhood of Orange in 2065, narrates a summer in the life of Kevin Clayborne, a young house renovator recently elected to the town council of El Modena. Kevin finds himself at odds with the town mayor, Alfredo Blair, both personally and professionally. On the personal side, both Kevin and Alfredo are vying for the affection of Ramona Sanchez, Alfredo's former long-term girlfriend. On the professional side, Alfredo has been influenced by corporate money and attempts to rezone the last virgin hill inside the town for commercial development. Kevin loses in all accounts: After attempting a relationship with Kevin, Ramona returns to Alfredo, and the rezoning of the hill is passed by the council and by a town vote. In a last attempt to save the hill, Kevin turns it into a memorial for his recently deceased grandfather, who was a pillar of the community. This makes the commercial development on the hill an unpalatable project for the town. At the end of the novel, Kevin attends Ramona and Alfredo's wedding, and mourns what he has lost and reflects on what he has achieved.

Pacific Edge was the winner of the John W. Campbell Memorial Award in 1991.

== Development ==
In an interview with the University of California, San Diego (UC San Diego), Robinson commented that "this was one of my few original ideas". He also mentioned that the idea for the novels came to him while he was still at UC San Diego, during a drive to visit his parents in Orange County, California.
