= Mars trilogy =

Series of science fiction novels by Kim Stanley Robinson

Covers of the Mars trilogy by Harper Voyager 2009 (UK)

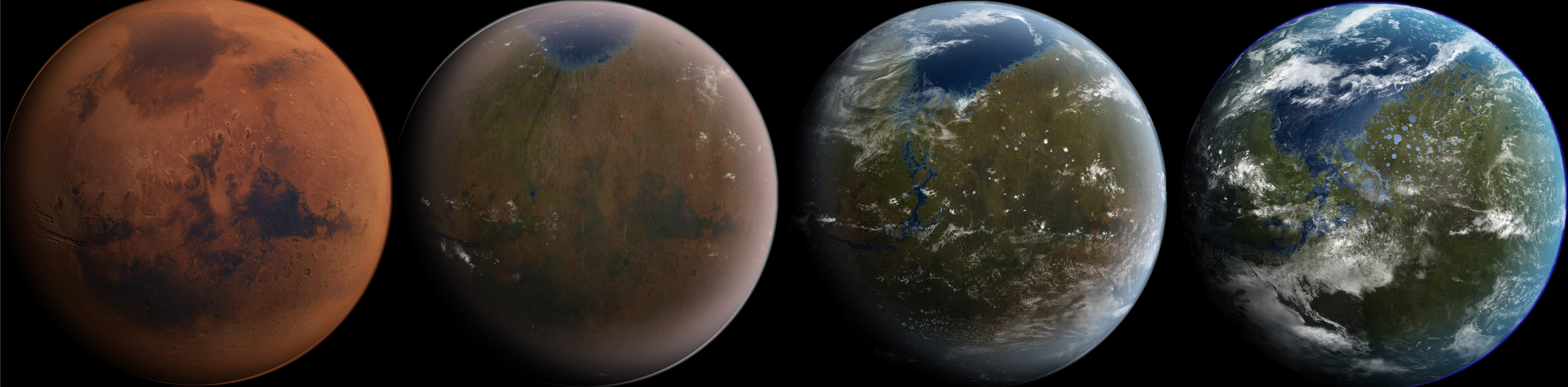
Terraforming Mars (2026 to 2212). The main novels are from Kim Stanley Robinson's "Mars trilogy" series

The Mars trilogy is a series of science fiction novels by Kim Stanley Robinson that chronicles the settlement and terraforming of the planet Mars through the personal and detailed viewpoints of a wide variety of characters spanning 187 years, from 2026 to 2212. Ultimately more utopian than dystopian, the story focuses on egalitarian, sociological, and scientific advances made on Mars, while Earth suffers from overpopulation and ecological disaster.

The three novels are Red Mars (1992), Green Mars (1993), and Blue Mars (1996). The Martians (1999) is a collection of short stories set in the same fictional universe. Red Mars won the BSFA Award in 1992 and Nebula Award for Best Novel in 1993. Green Mars won the Hugo Award for Best Novel and Locus Award for Best Science Fiction Novel in 1994. Blue Mars also won the Hugo and Locus Awards in 1997.

Icehenge (1984), Robinson's first novel about Mars, is not set in this universe but deals with similar themes and plot elements. The trilogy shares some similarities with Robinson's more recent novel 2312 (2012); for instance, the terraforming of Mars and the extreme longevity of the characters in both novels.

== Plot ==
=== Red Mars – Colonization ===
Red Mars
- Author: Kim Stanley Robinson
- Cover artist: Don Dixon
- Language: English
- Series: Mars Trilogy
- Genre: Science fiction
- Publisher: Spectra/Bantam Dell/Random House
- Publication date: September 1992
- Publication place: United States
- Media type: Print (hardback & paperback)
- Pages: 519 (hardcover)
- Awards: Nebula Award (1993), British Science Fiction Association Award (1993)
- ISBN: 0-553-09204-9
- OCLC: 26054317
- Dewey Decimal: 813/.54 20
- LC Class: PS3568.O2893 R44 1993
- Followed by: Green Mars

Red Mars starts in 2026 with the first colonial voyage to Mars aboard the Ares, the largest interplanetary spacecraft ever built and home to a crew who are to be the first hundred Martian colonists. The ship was built from clustered space shuttle external fuel tanks which, instead of reentering Earth's atmosphere, had been boosted into orbit until enough had been amassed to build the ship. The mission is a joint American–Russian undertaking, and seventy of the First Hundred are drawn from these countries (except, for example, Michel Duval, a French psychologist assigned to observe their behavior). The book details: the trip out; construction of the first Martian settlement (eventually called Underhill) by Russian engineer Nadia Cherneshevsky, as well as establishing colonies on Mars' hollowed out asteroid-moon Phobos; the ever-changing relationships between the colonists; and debates among the colonists regarding both the terraforming of the planet and its future relationship to Earth. The two extreme views on terraforming are personified by Saxifrage "Sax" Russell, who believes their very presence on the planet means some level of terraforming has already begun and that it is humanity's obligation to spread life as it is the most scarce thing in the known universe; and Ann Clayborne, who poses that humankind does not have the right to change entire planets at their will.

Russell's view is initially purely scientific but in time comes to blend with the views of Hiroko Ai, the chief of the Agricultural Team who assembles a new belief system (the "Areophany") devoted to the appreciation and furthering of life ("viriditas"); these views are collectively known as the "Green" position, while Clayborne's naturalist stance comes to be known as "Red". The actual decision is left to the United Nations Organization of Mars Affairs (UNOMA), which greenlights terraforming, and a series of actions get underway, including the drilling of "moholes" to release subsurface heat; thickening of the atmosphere according to a complicated biochemical formula that comes to be known as the "Russell cocktail" after Sax Russell; and the detonation of nuclear explosions deep in the subsurface permafrost to release water. Additional steps are taken to connect Mars more closely with Earth, including the insertion of an areosynchronous asteroid "Clarke" to which a space elevator cable is tethered.

Against the backdrop of this development is another debate, the principal instigator of which is Arkady Bogdanov of the Russian contingent (possibly named in homage to the Russian polymath and science fiction writer Alexander Bogdanov—it is later revealed in Blue Mars that Arkady is a descendant of Alexander). Bogdanov argues that Mars need not and should not be subject to Earth traditions, limitations, or authority. He is to some extent joined in this position by John Boone, famous as the "First Man on Mars" from a preceding expedition and rival to Frank Chalmers, the technical leader of the American contingent. Their rivalry is further exacerbated by competing romantic interest in Maya Katarina Toitovna, the leader of the Russian contingent. (In the opening of the book, Chalmers instigates a sequence of events that leads to Boone being assassinated; much of what follows is a retrospective examination of what led to that point.)

Earth meanwhile increasingly falls under the control of transnational corporations (transnats) that come to dominate its governments, particularly smaller nations adopted as "flags of convenience" for extending their influence into Martian affairs. As UNOMA's power erodes, the Mars treaty is renegotiated in a move led by Frank Chalmers; the outcome is impressive but proves short-lived as the transnats find ways around it through loopholes. Things get worse as the nations of Earth start to clash over limited resources, expanding debt, and population growth, as well as restrictions on access to a new longevity treatment developed by Martian scientists—one that holds the promise of lifespans into the hundreds of years. In 2061, with Boone dead and exploding immigration threatening the fabric of Martian society, Bogdanov launches a revolution against what many now view as occupying transnat troops operating only loosely under an UNOMA rubber-stamp approval. Initially successful, the revolution proves infeasible on the basis of both a greater-than-expected willingness of the Earth troops to use violence, and the extreme vulnerability of life on a planet without a habitable atmosphere. A series of exchanges sees the cutting of the space elevator cable, bombardment of several Martian cities (including the city where Bogdanov is himself organizing the rebellion; he is killed), the destruction of Phobos and its military complex, and the unleashing of a great flood of torrential groundwater freed by nuclear detonations.

By the end, most of the First Hundred are dead, and virtually all who remain have fled to a hidden refuge established years earlier by Ai and her followers (one exception is Phyllis Boyle, who has allied herself with the transnats; she is on Clarke when the space elevator cable is cut and sent flying out of orbit to a fate unknown by the conclusion of the book). The revolution dies and life on Mars returns to a sense of stability under heavy transnat control. The clash over resources on Earth breaks out into a full-blown world war leaving hundreds of millions dead, but ceasefire arrangements are reached when the transnats flee to the safety of the developed nations, which use their huge militaries to restore order, forming police states. However, a new generation of humans born on Mars holds the promise of change. In the meantime, the remaining First Hundred—including Russell, Clayborne, Toitovna, and Cherneshevsky—settle into life in Hiroko Ai's refuge called Zygote, hidden under the Martian south pole.

=== Green Mars – Terraforming ===
Green Mars
- Author: Kim Stanley Robinson
- Cover artist: Don Dixon
- Language: English
- Series: Mars Trilogy
- Genre: Science fiction
- Publisher: Spectra/Bantam Dell/Random House
- Publication date: October 1993
- Publication place: United States
- Media type: Print (hardback & paperback)
- Pages: 535 (hardcover)
- Awards: Hugo Award for Best Novel (1994), Locus Award for Best Science Fiction Novel (1994)
- ISBN: 0-553-09640-0
- Preceded by: Red Mars
- Followed by: Blue Mars

Green Mars takes its title from the stage of terraforming that has allowed plants to grow. It picks up the story 50 years after the events of Red Mars in the dawn of the 22nd century, following the lives of the remaining First Hundred and their children and grandchildren. Melting ice causes the top of the dome of Hiroko Ai's base under the south pole to collapse, forcing the survivors to escape into a (less literal) underground organization known as the Demimonde. Among the expanded group are the First Hundred's children, the Nisei, a number of whom live in Hiroko's second secret base, Gamete.

As unrest in the multinational control over Mars' affairs grows, various groups start to form with different aims and methods. Watching these groups evolve from Earth, the CEO of the Praxis Corporation sends a representative, Arthur Randolph, to organize resistance movements. This culminates into the Dorsa Brevia agreement, in which nearly all the underground factions take part. Preparations are made for a second revolution beginning in the 2120s, from converting moholes to missiles silos or hidden bases, sabotaging orbital mirrors, to propelling Deimos out of Mars' gravity well and out into deep space so it could never be used as a weapons platform as Phobos was.

The book follows the characters across the Martian landscape, which is explained in detail. Sax Russell infiltrates the transnat terraforming project, with a carefully crafted fake identity as Stephen Lindholm. The newly evolving Martian biosphere is described at great length and with more profound changes mostly aimed at warming up the surface of Mars to the brink of making it habitable, from continent-sized orbital mirrors, another space elevator built (using another anchored asteroid that is dubbed "New Clarke"), to melting the northern polar ice cap, and digging moholes deep enough to form volcanoes. A mainstay of the novel is a detailed analysis of philosophical, political, personal, economic, and geological experiences of the characters. The story weaves back and forth from character to character, providing a picture of Mars as seen by them.

Sax, alias Stephen, eventually becomes romantically involved with Phyllis, who had survived the events of 2061 from the end of the first novel, but she discovers his true identity and has him arrested. Members of the underground launch a daring rescue from the prison facility where Sax suffers torture and interrogation that causes him to have a stroke; Maya kills Phyllis in the process of the rescue.

The book ends on a major event which is a sudden catastrophic rise in Earth's global sea levels not caused primarily by any greenhouse effect but by the eruption of a chain of volcanoes underneath the ice of West Antarctica, disintegrating the ice sheet and displacing the fragments into the ocean. The resultant flooding causes global chaos on Earth, creating the perfect moment for the Martian underground to seize control of Martian society from Earth. Following a series of largely bloodless coups, an extremist faction of Reds bombs a dam near Burroughs, the major city where the remaining United Nations forces have concentrated, in order to force the security forces to evacuate. The entire city is flooded and the population of the city has to walk a staggeringly long distance in the open Martian atmosphere (which just barely has the temperature, atmospheric pressure, and gas mixture to support human life) to Libya Station, in order to resettle in other locations. With this, control of Mars is finally wrested away from Earth with minimal loss of life, leaving the weary survivors hopeful about the prospects of their newfound political autonomy.

=== Blue Mars – Long-term results ===
Blue Mars
- Author: Kim Stanley Robinson
- Cover artist: Don Dixon
- Language: English
- Series: Mars Trilogy
- Genre: Science fiction
- Publisher: Spectra/Bantam Dell/Random House
- Publication date: April 1996
- Publication place: United States
- Media type: Print (hardback & paperback)
- Pages: 609 (hardcover)
- Awards: Hugo Award for Best Novel (1997), Locus Award for Best Science Fiction Novel (1997)
- ISBN: 0-553-10144-7
- Preceded by: Green Mars

Blue Mars takes its title from the stage of terraforming that has allowed atmospheric pressure and temperature to increase so that liquid water can exist on the planet's surface, forming rivers and seas. It follows closely in time from the end of Green Mars and has a much wider scope than the previous two books, covering an entire century after the second revolution. As Earth is heavily flooded by the sudden melting of the Antarctic ice cap, the once mighty metanats are brought to their knees, as the Praxis Corporation paves a new way of "democratic businesses". Mars becomes the "Head" of the system, giving universal healthcare, free education, and an abundance of food. However, this sparks illegal immigration from Earth, so to ease the population strain on the Blue Planet, Martian scientists and engineers are soon put to the task of creating asteroid cities; where small planetoids of the asteroid belt are hollowed out, given a spin to produce gravity, and a miniature sun is created to produce light and heat.

With a vast increase in sciences, technologies, and spacecraft manufacturing, this begins the "Accelerando"; where humankind spreads its civilization throughout the Solar System, and eventually beyond. As Venus, the Jovian moons, the Saturnian moons, and eventually Triton are colonized and terraformed in some way, Jackie Boone (the granddaughter of John Boone, the first man to walk on Mars from the first book) takes an interstellar vessel (made out of an asteroid) to another star system twenty light-years away, where they will start to terraform the planets and moons found there.

The remaining First Hundred are generally regarded as living legends. Reports of Hiroko's survival are numerous, and purported sightings occur all over the colonized solar system, but none are substantiated. Nadia and Art Randolph lead a constitutional congress in which a global system of government is established that leaves most cities and settlements generally autonomous, but subject to a central representative legislature and two systems of courts, one legal and the other environmental. The environmental court is packed with members of the Red faction as a concession (in exchange for their support in the congress, as much of their power was broken when they attempted and failed to violently expel remaining UN forces early on after the second revolution of Green Mars; yet they still retained enough power to stymie constitutional negotiations). Vlad, Marina, and Ursula, the original inventors of the longevity treatments, introduce a new economic system that is a hybrid of capitalism, socialism, and environmental conservationism. During a trip to Earth occurring alongside the congress, Nirgal (one of the original children to be born on Mars to the First Hundred, and something of a Mars-wide celebrity), Maya, and Sax negotiate an agreement that allows Earth to send a number of migrants equal to 10% of Mars' population to Mars every year. Following the adoption of the new constitution, Nadia is elected the first president of Mars and serves competently, although she does not enjoy politics. She and Art work together closely, and eventually fall in love and have a child.

Sax Russell devotes himself to various scientific projects, all the while continuing to recover from the effects of his stroke. Since the second revolution, he feels enormous guilt that his pro-terraforming position became the dominant one at the expense of the goals of Ann's anti-terraforming stance, as Sax and Ann have come to be regarded as the original champions of their respective positions. Sax becomes increasingly preoccupied with seeking forgiveness and approval from Ann, while Ann, depressed and bitter from her many political and personal losses, is suicidal and refuses to accept any more longevity treatments. However, when Sax witnesses Ann collapse into a coma during an attempt to demonstrate to her the beauty of the terraformed world, he arranges for her to be resuscitated and to be treated with the longevity treatment, both against her will.

The longevity treatments themselves begin to show weaknesses once those receiving them reach the two-century mark in age. The treatments reduce most aging processes to a negligible rate, but are much less effective when it comes to brain function, and in particular memory. Maya in particular suffers extreme lapses in memory, although she remains high functioning most of the time. Further, as people age, they begin to show susceptibility to strange, fatal conditions which have no apparent explanation and are resistant to any treatment. Most common is the event that comes to be known as the "quick decline", where a person of extremely advanced age and in apparently good health suffers a sudden fatal heart arrhythmia and dies abruptly. The exact mechanism is never explained. Michel dies of the quick decline, while attending the wake of another First Hundred member. Russell speculates that Michel's quick decline was brought on by the shock of seeing Maya fail to remember Frank Chalmers (who was killed while escaping security forces in the first revolution) upon looking at a treasured photo of him on her refrigerator. As a result of this and Russell's own problems with memory, he organizes a team of scientists to develop medicine that will restore memory. The remaining members of the First Hundred, of which there are only 12, congregate in Underhill, and take the medicine. It works so well that Russell remembers his own birth. He and Ann Clayborne finally recall that they had been in love prior to leaving Earth the very first time, but both had been too socially inept and nervous about their chances for selection for the Mars voyage to reveal this to each other. Their famous argument over terraforming had been a mere continuation of a running conversation they had been having since they still lived on Earth. Through the memory treatment it is also revealed that Phyllis had been lobbying to free Sax from his torturers when she was murdered by Maya. Maya herself declines the treatment. Sax also distinctly recalls Hiroko assisting him in finding his rover in a storm before he nearly froze to death before disappearing once again and is convinced she remains alive, although the question of whether she is actually alive is never resolved.

Eventually, the anti-immigration factions of the Martian government provoke massive illegal immigration from Earth, risking another war; however, under the leadership of Ann and Sax, who have fallen in love again following their reconciliation, along with Maya, the Martian population unites to reconstitute the government to accept more immigration from Earth, defusing the imminent conflict and ushering in a new golden age of harmony and security on Mars.

=== The Martians – Short stories ===
The Martians
- Author: Kim Stanley Robinson
- Cover artist: Don Dixon
- Language: English
- Series: Mars Trilogy
- Genre: Science fiction
- Publisher: Spectra/Bantam Dell/Random House
- Publication date: April 1999
- Publication place: United States
- Media type: Print (hardcover & paperback)
- Pages: 336 (hardcover)
- Awards: Locus Award for Best Collection (2000)
- ISBN: 0-553-80117-1

The Martians is a collection of short stories that takes place over the timespan of the original trilogy of novels, as well as some stories that take place in an alternate version of the novels where the First Hundred's mission was one of exploration rather than colonization. Buried in the stories are several hints about the eventual fate of the Martian terraforming program.

- "Michel in Antarctica"
- "Exploring Fossil Canyon" (originally published in Universe 12, 1982)
- "The Archaea Plot"
- "The Way the Land Spoke to Us"
- "Maya and Desmond"
- "Four Teleological Trails"
- "Coyote Makes Trouble"
- "Michel in Provence"
- "Green Mars" (originally published in Asimov's Science Fiction 1985)
- "Discovering Life" (also in Vinland the Dream)
- "Arthur Sternbach Brings the Curveball to Mars" (subsequently anthologized)
- "Salt and Fresh"
- "The Constitution of Mars"
- "Some Work Notes and Commentary on the Constitution by Charlotte Dorsa Brevia"
- "Jackie on Zo"
- "Keeping the Flame"
- "Saving Noctis Dam"
- "Big Man in Love"
- "An Argument for the Deployment of All Safe Terraforming Technologies"
- "Selected Abstracts from The Journal of Areological Studies"
- "Odessa"
- "Sexual Dimorphism" (Originally in: Asimov's Science Fiction, June 1999 and subsequently anthologized, including Hartwell, David G., ed. (2000). Year's Best SF 5. Harper Collins. ISBN 0-06-102054-0.; Cramer, Kathryn; Hartwell, David G., eds. (2002). The Hard SF Renaissance. Tom Doherty Associates. ISBN 0-312-87635-1.; and Aldiss, Brian, ed. (2007). A Science Fiction Omnibus. Penguin UK. ISBN 978-0-14-118892-8. Nominated for the James Tiptree, Jr. Award, which celebrates gender-bending science fiction.)
- "Enough Is as Good as a Feast" (the title phrase appears often in the Science in the Capital series)
- "What Matters"
- "Coyote Remembers"
- "Sax Moments"
- "A Martian Romance" (originally published in Asimov's Science Fiction, October–November 1999, subsequently anthologized)
- ""If Wang Wei Lived on Mars and Other Poems"" inc "The Names of the Canals", "The Soundtrack"
- "Purple Mars"

== Story elements ==
=== Corporations ===
Trans-national Corporations, nicknamed "transnats", are extremely powerful multinational corporations that first emerge in the mid-21st century. Robinson tracks the evolution of the transnats into what he terms "metanats" (metanational). These multinational corporations have grown so large as a result of globalization that they have sufficient economic power to take over or strongly manipulate national governments, initially only relatively small third-world governments, but later, larger developed governments too, effectively running whole countries. In Robinson's future history, the metanational corporations become similar to nation-states in some respects, while continually attempting to take over competitors in order to become the sole controller of the interplanetary market. As the Mars trilogy draws to a close in the mid-23rd century, the metanational corporations are forced by a global catastrophe to concede more democratic powers to their workforces.

Although there are many transnational and metanational corporations mentioned, two play an active role in the development of the plotline: Praxis, a largely benevolent and relatively democratic firm, and Subarashī, which plays a large role in the mistreatment of the citizens of Mars.

=== Genetic engineering ===
Genetic engineering (GE) is first mentioned in Red Mars; it takes off when Sax creates an alga to withstand the harsh Martian temperature and convert its atmosphere into breathable air. Eventually this is done on a massive scale, with thousands of types of GE algae, lichen and bacteria being created to terraform the planet. In Green Mars, GE animals began to be created to withstand the thin Martian atmosphere, and to produce a working planetary-biosphere. By Blue Mars, GE is commonly being done on humans, willingly, to help them better adapt to the new worlds; to breathe thinner air (e.g. Russell), or to see better in the dimmer light of the outer planets.

=== Other themes ===
The books also speculate on the colonization of other planets and moons in the Solar System, and include descriptions of settlements or terraforming efforts on Callisto, Mercury, Titania, Miranda and Venus. Toward the end of the last novel, humans are taking sub-lightspeed colony ships to other stars, taking advantage of the longevity treatments to survive the trip to their destinations.

A great portion of Blue Mars is concerned with the effects of extreme longevity on its protagonists, most of whom have lived over two hundred years as a result of repeated longevity treatments. In particular, Robinson speculates on the psychological effects of ultra-longevity, including memory loss, personality change, mental instability, and existential boredom.

== Characters ==
=== The First Hundred ===
The initial colonists from the Ares who established a permanent colony. Many of them later become leaders or exemplary figures in the transformation of Mars or its new society. The "First Hundred" actually consisted of 101, with Coyote being smuggled aboard the Ares by Hiroko.

==== John Boone ====
An American astronaut, who was the first human to walk on Mars in the year 2020. He returns a public hero and uses his considerable influence to lobby for a second mission, this time one of colonization. Boone received a large amount of radiation on his first trip to Mars, more than the recommended dosage according to medical regulations. However, his celebrity status allows him to skirt this. On the second voyage, Boone is one of the "First Hundred" colonists sent to permanently colonize Mars. His accomplishments and natural charm yield him an informal leadership role. In the first chapter of Red Mars, John Boone is assassinated in a plot instigated by Frank Chalmers. The narrative then steps back to the First Hundred's voyage to Mars aboard the spaceship Ares. His ideas continue as a point of reference for the remainder of the trilogy. Boone's character portrayal is complex; in one light, Boone is a stereotypically simple, heroic figure, an everyman hero: his first words on his first trip to Mars are "Well, here we are." He is almost uniformly cheerful and good-natured, and approaches everything he undertakes with hale bonhomie. But later in Red Mars, Robinson switches to Boone's point of view, and it is in this section that it is revealed that late in life, Boone is addicted to omegendorph, a fictional drug that is based on endorphins in the human brain. In addition, it reveals that at least some of his seeming simplicity might simply be an act designed to further his political goals. Overall, Boone is presented as larger-than-life.

==== Frank Chalmers ====
Head of the American contingent, he is Machiavellian in his use of power. However, his cynicism is later shown to be a form of self-defense; Chalmers is at least partly driven by a hidden idealistic side. Early in the voyage to Mars, he becomes sexually involved with Maya Toitovna, the leader of the Russian contingent of the mission. During the second half of the voyage, Toitovna becomes involved with Boone. Already bitter that Boone became the first to walk on Mars instead of him as they were both candidates for the mission and that he was allowed to join the colonization trip despite his manipulations, Chalmers further despises Boone because of Toitovna's affection. His dislike culminates in his involvement in a plot to assassinate Boone, which ultimately succeeds and allows him to take over handling major affairs on Mars. This ultimately becomes his undoing, as his ruthless governance and aggressive diplomatic work backfire on him during the revolution of 2061. In the final chapters of Red Mars, Chalmers flees with Toitovna and other members of the First Hundred to join the hidden colonists at the polar ice cap but dies along the way when he is caught outside their vehicle during an aquifer flood in Valles Marineris.

==== Maya Toitovna ====
An emotional woman who is at the center of a love triangle between Boone and Chalmers, she begins as head of the Russian contingent. The novels hint that she used both wit and seduction to rise through the ranks of the Russian space agency to become the leader of the first colonization mission. After the first revolution, she flees with other members of the First Hundred to the hidden colony in the pole. She becomes a school teacher of the children of the hidden colonists but later becomes a powerful political force. After the deaths of Chalmers and Boone, she falls in love with Michel Duval. She suffers heavily from bipolar disorder and from memory-related psychological disorders with growing age, which often lead her to isolate herself from others and sometimes turn violent. Throughout the novels, Maya takes an active political role, helping to keep the surviving First Hundred together during the failed revolution of 2061 and guiding the successful revolutions that occur decades later, despite her psychological problems.

==== Nadezhda "Nadia" Chernyshevski ====
A Russian engineer who started out building nuclear reactors in Siberia, during the voyage and initial exploration of Mars, she does her best to avoid the squabbles of the other members of the First Hundred. Instead, she busies herself by building the first permanent habitation of Mars, Underhill, using programmed automated robots. She also helps to construct a new and larger habitat, and research facility in a nearby canyon. In the later books, she becomes a reluctant politician. Chernyshevski is in love with Bogdanov and is devastated when he is killed in an attack by anti-revolutionary forces associated with UNOMA, the transnationals and Phyllis Boyle during the first Martian revolution. In retaliation for Bogdanov's murder, she activates his hidden weapon system, built into Phobos, which causes the entire moon (a UNOMA/transnational military base) to decelerate in orbit and destructively aerobrake in Mars' atmosphere, utterly destroying it. In Blue Mars, she falls in love with Art Randolph, with whom she eventually starts a family. After Martian independence, she grudgingly becomes the first president of Mars.

==== Arkady Bogdanov ====
A mechanical engineer with anarchist leanings, possibly based on the Russian Machist, Alexander Bogdanov (the character's ancestor) and Arkady Strugatsky, he is regarded by many other members of the First Hundred, particularly Boyle, as a troublemaker. He leads the team which establishes an outpost on the moon Phobos, and leads an uprising against the transnational corporations towards the end of the first novel. Like Boone (with whom he was good friends), his political ideas (later known as Bogdanovism) weigh heavily on characters later in the series. In love with Nadia Chernyshevski, he is killed during the first Martian revolution in 2061.

==== Saxifrage "Sax" Russell ====
An American physicist, he is a brilliant and creative scientist, and is greatly respected for his intellectual gifts. However, he is socially awkward and often finds it difficult to understand and relate to other people. Russell is a leader of the Green movement, the goal of which is to terraform Mars. During Green Mars, Sax suffers a stroke while being tortured by government security forces and fellow member of the First Hundred, Phyllis Boyle (although it is later revealed that she actually opposed Sax's torture). He subsequently has expressive aphasia and has to relearn how to speak and becomes less predictable in his actions. Originally apolitical, this event and a growing attachment to Mars itself leads Russell to become the physical architect of the second revolution. After memory issues become apparent in many of the remaining first hundred including Sax he begins work on an ambitious project to gather the remaining first hundred and have them try an experimental treatment he helped to develop. It is after this that Sax realizes his persistent attempts to please Ann are actually because he is also secretly in love with Ann Clayborne, who cannot stand him at first, but after centuries on Mars, eventually reconciles. Saxifrage means "stonebreaker" and is the name for an Alpine plant that grows between stones.

==== Ann Clayborne ====
An American geologist, Clayborne is one of the first areologists and maintains a stalwart desire to see Mars preserved in the state it holds when humans arrive. Clayborne early on debates Saxifrage Russell over the proper role of humanity on Mars and though initially apolitical, this stance marks her as the original "Red," while Russell's hands-on terraforming reflects the antithesis of these views. Clayborne is shown to prefer solitude during much of the series, and even her relationship with fellow First Hundred settler Simon (with whom she has a child) is subject to introspective silence in most cases. Simon's death and the estrangement she finds from their son Peter when the latter emerges as a leading moderate "green" drive her to further isolation. Clayborne's relationship with Russell is shown to be complex, the two of them taking early opposite views but the situation slowly changing as Russell comes to appreciate what has been unleashed and what has indeed been lost as science gives way to commercial exploitation that he cannot control. During the events of Blue Mars, Russell intervenes to save Clayborne's life; later, the two are revealed to have once shared an attraction that went astray because of a casual misinterpretation between them. Ann undergoes a drastic change toward Blue Mars due to the emergence of something inside of her that she describes as anti-Ann and something else that she can't quite describe.

==== Hiroko Ai (Japanese: 愛紘子) ====
A Japanese expert on biology, agriculture, and ecological systems, it was Ai who smuggled Desmond "Coyote" Hawkins onto the Ares (the two were friends and lovers as students in London). She is the charismatic leader of the farm team, one of the important work groups and cliques among the First Hundred. She thus becomes the focus of many of the trilogy's central themes. Most importantly, she teaches the importance of maintaining a respectful relation with one's planet. On Mars, this is called the Areophany. In the secret colony Zygote, which Hiroko established, the first generation of children of the First Hundred, the ectogenes, are all the product of artificial insemination outside of any human body. Hiroko uses the ova of the female members of the First Hundred as the female genetic material and uses the sperm of the male members of the First Hundred to fertilize the ova. Although Hiroko is seldom at the center of the narrative, her influence is pervasive. She disappears for the final time in Green Mars. Her ultimate fate is left unresolved. Ai (愛) is the Japanese word for love.

==== Michel Duval ====
A French psychologist pivotally involved in the early psychological screening of the First Hundred candidates in Antarctica, which he describes as being a collection of double-bind requirements. Duval is assigned to accompany the Mars mission and is treated as an observer rather than as a member of the team during the early events of Red Mars. His aloof personality enforces this ostracism and also subverts his relationships with others, but in time it becomes clear that Duval is struggling with his own psychological issues perhaps more than anyone else from the expedition. During the first disappearance of the farm team, he is invited by Hiroko to flee with the farm team and establish Zygote, the first hidden colony. Duval desperately wants to return to Provence as he remembers it, and after visiting as a part of the Martian diplomatic mission to Earth, he becomes even more homesick. Duval falls in love with Maya Toitovna and guides her through particularly challenging psychological episodes throughout most of the series, dying late in Blue Mars of heart arrhythmia when Maya displays signs of very heavy temporary memory loss.

==== Vladimir "Vlad" Taneev ====
Nearly sixty when he arrives on Mars, a Russian biological scientist who is the oldest of the First Hundred. Taneev heads medical treatment and most research projects on Mars, becoming famous as the creator of the gerontological treatment used to regenerate human cellular systems and ushering in a new era of longevity. He lives in Acheron on the Great Escarpment in the north of Mars before fleeing to the hidden colony after the First Revolution but later returns to his research, falling victim to "quick decline" late in the events of Blue Mars. For much of his Mars-centric life, Taneev lives in a ménage à trois with Ursula and Marina, the exact nature of which is never resolved.

==== Phyllis Boyle ====
A Christian American geologist with a harsh personality that does not win her many friends among the First Hundred and gains particular enmity from Ann Clayborne. As the Mars situation develops, Boyle sides against most of the First Hundred in favor of the increasingly authoritarian United Nations Office of Mars Affairs (UNOMA) and its successor, the corporate/quasi-fascist United Nations Transitional Authority (UNTA). Her influence is strongest during the later events of Red Mars, where by the 2061 revolution she has been placed in charge of the asteroid Clarke that serves as the counterweight of the First Space Elevator. The events of the revolution send Clarke (and Boyle) spinning off into the outer Solar System at the end of Red Mars; Green Mars finds her back in the equation, but her influence is greatly reduced against the backdrop of a much-expanded UNTA presence. Boyle engages in a brief sexual relationship with Saxifrage Russell (who despises her) while the latter is living under an assumed identity and is singularly capable of discerning who he really is, turning him over the UNTA. She is later present at a session in Kasei Vallis where Russell is being tortured, and is killed by Maya Toitovna. Later, as his memory recovers, Russell reveals that Boyle had been opposed to his torture and was demanding that he be released at the time that Maya's team freed him.

==== Desmond "Coyote" Hawkins ====
A Trinidadian stowaway, Hawkins was a friend and supporter of Hiroko, as well as a fervent anarchist communist. Present in Red Mars only as a stowaway who blends effortlessly into the Martian background, he is not identified as anything more than Coyote until the beginning of Green Mars. Hawkins becomes a leading figure in the underground and an unofficial coordinator of the developing gift economy.

=== Their descendants ===
Since the trilogy covers over 200 years of human history, later immigrants and the children and grandchildren of the First Hundred eventually become important characters in their own right.

The Martians use the same terminology for different generations as Japanese Americans. People who immigrated from Earth are called issei, the first generation born on Mars are nisei, and the second-generation Martians are sansei. Third-generation Martians are called yonsei.

==== Kasei ====
Kasei is the son of Hiroko and John Boone and the father of Jackie Boone. Kasei is the leader of the Kakaze, a radical Red faction. His name is Japanese for the planet Mars. He dies during the second revolution, after an unsuccessful attack on the second space elevator.

==== Nirgal ====
The son of Hiroko and Coyote, he is raised communally by Hiroko and her followers in Zygote. He is a good-natured wanderer who eventually becomes a political leader advocating ties with Earth. He is one of the founders of the Free Mars movement and is famous for his running technique that allows him to run all day for days on end. As Nadia's assistants, he and Art are instrumental in getting the Martian constitutional declaration written. Later he is sent on a diplomatic mission to Earth but nearly dies from an infection. His name is ancient Babylonian for Mars (the planet and the war-god).

==== Jackie Boone ====
The granddaughter of Hiroko and John Boone (raised with Nirgal), she emerges as a leader of the Free Mars movement, but is seen to change her platform based on whatever keeps her in power (e.g. changing from banning Earth immigration to allowing almost unlimited immigrants). After her daughter Zo's death, she retires in grief and joins a one-way expedition to an extrasolar planet near Aldebaran.

==== Peter Clayborne ====
Peter Clayborne is the son of Ann Clayborne and Simon Frazier, being one of the first children born on Mars. Peter holds a position of older brother to all of the following first generation. Many revolutionary and later political decisions of the Mars First movement are influenced by his opinions and judgment. He works part-time as an engineer and a green politician.

==== Zoya "Zo" Boone ====
Jackie's daughter; she has feline traits (purring) inserted into her genome via the gerontological longevity treatment. In Blue Mars, she travels the solar system running political errands for Jackie, although the two do not get along particularly well. Her character is portrayed as hedonistic and explicitly nihilistic, making sexual satisfaction a priority and seemingly having little regard for the feelings of others. On the other hand, she apparently has a conscience, risking her life to rescue a man on Mercury and later dying in an attempt to save a distressed flier.

==== Nikki ====
The daughter of Nadia and Art.

=== Other characters ===
==== Arthur "Art" Randolph ====
A representative of the Praxis corporation sent to contact the Martian underground movement on a quasi-diplomatic mission in an attempt to create a system of ecological capitalism based on democratic corporations. Like the other metanationals, it takes on intensive economic and political ties with governments, but Praxis aims for partnerships rather than exploitive relationships.

==== Zeyk Tuqan (Arabic: زيك طوقان) and his wife Nazik (Arabic: نازك) ====
Bedouin nomads who originally emigrated from Egypt and respected figures in the Arab Martian community. Zeyk is a close friend of Chalmers. His eidetic memory becomes a minor plot point.

==== William Fort ====
The founder of Praxis, one of the largest multinational corporations in the series, embraced a fusion of Eastern and Western lifestyles.

== Development history ==
In an interview at UCSD, Robinson said that he was looking at a satellite photo of Mars and thought that would be a great place to go backpacking. He said the Mars trilogy grew out of that urge.

== Awards ==
- Red Mars won the BSFA in 1992, Nebula Award for Best Novel Award in 1993, and was nominated for the Hugo, Clarke, and Locus Awards in 1993.
- Green Mars won the Hugo Award for Best Novel and Locus Awards in 1994, and was nominated for the BSFA (1993) and Nebula Awards (1994).
- Blue Mars won the Hugo Award for Best Novel and Locus Awards in 1997, was nominated for a BSFA Award in 1996, and received nominations for the Campbell and Clarke Awards in 1997.

== Adaptations and uses ==
=== Screen adaptations ===
The series has had difficulty moving into film and TV for over two decades. The Mars trilogy screen production rights were held by James Cameron in the late 1990s, who conceived a five-hour miniseries to be directed by Martha Coolidge, but he subsequently passed on the option. Later, Gale Ann Hurd planned a similar mini-series for the Sci-Fi Channel, which also remained unproduced. Then, in October 2008, it was reported that AMC and Jonathan Hensleigh had teamed up and were planning to develop a television mini-series based on Red Mars.

In September 2014, SpikeTV announced it was working with producer Vince Gerardis to develop a TV series adaptation of Red Mars and in December 2015, formally greenlit a ten-episode first season of a TV series based on the novels, with J. Michael Straczynski serving as showrunner and writer. However, in March 2016, Deadline reported that Straczynski had left his position as showrunner with Peter Noah replacing him, but he too left due to creative differences with Spike. Spike then put the series on hold for further development.

=== On Phoenix spacecraft ===
The content of Green Mars and the cover artwork for Red Mars are included on the Phoenix DVD, carried on board Phoenix, a NASA lander that successfully touched down on Mars in May 2008. The First Interplanetary Library is intended to be a sort of time capsule for future Mars explorers and colonists.

== Translations in other languages ==
The trilogy has been translated into Spanish, French, German, Russian, Chinese, Polish, Hebrew, Japanese, Italian, Romanian, Bulgarian, and Serbian, among others.

== See also ==
- Colonization of Mars
- Ethics of terraforming
- Lee's flag of Mars, inspired by the trilogy
- Mars in fiction
- Red Star (novel), the 1908 utopian science fiction novel by Alexander Bogdanov about a technologically and socially advanced society on Mars. Referenced as an inspiration for the Mars Trilogy.
- Terraforming Mars (board game), a board game heavily inspired by the trilogy
- Terraforming of Mars
- TerraGenesis, inspired by the trilogy
