= Kim Stanley Robinson =

American science fiction writer (born 1952)

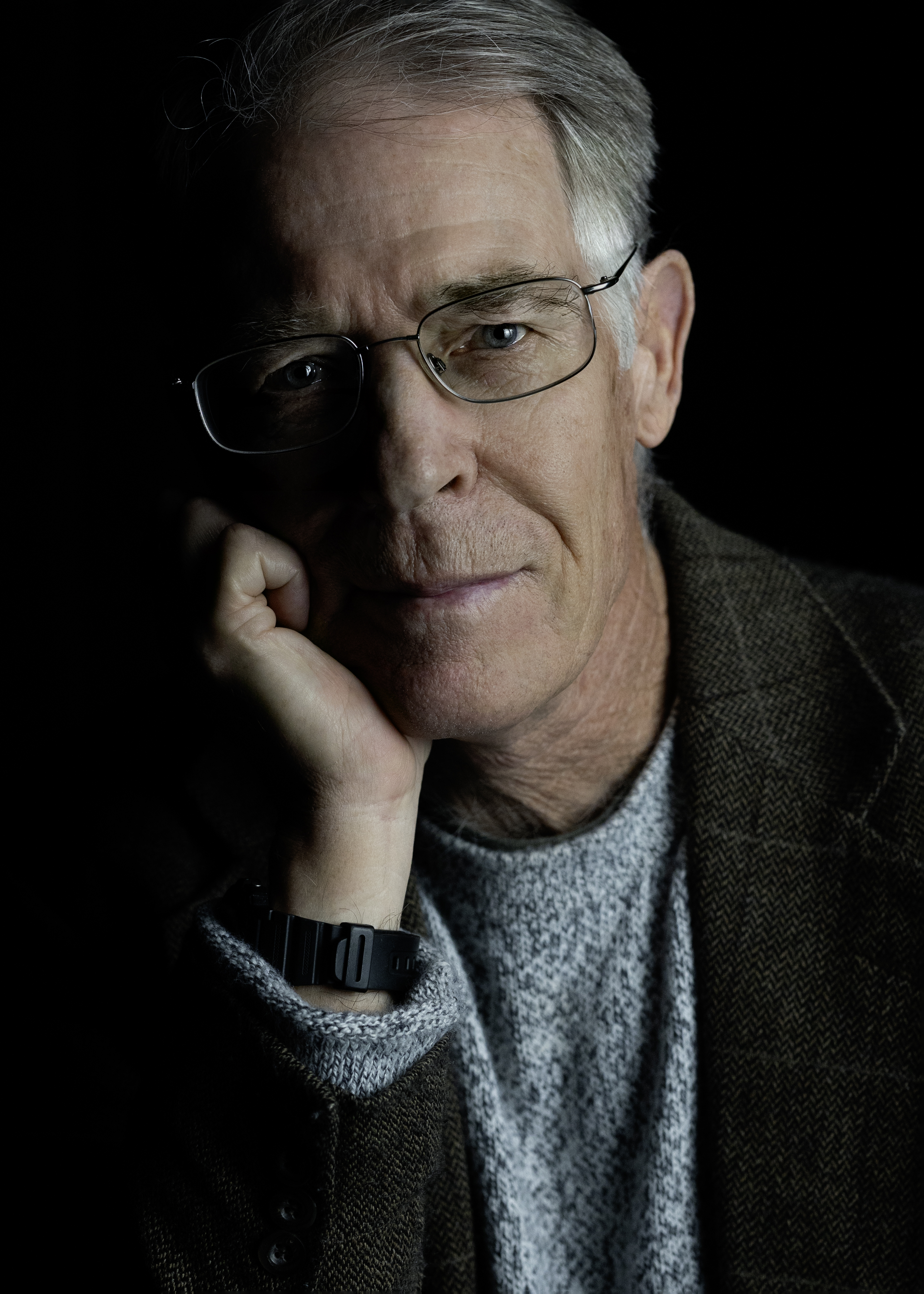
- Robinson in 2025
- Born: March 23, 1952 (age 74); Waukegan, Illinois, U.S.
- Education: University of California, San Diego (BA, PhD); Boston University (MA)
- Occupation: Writer
- Writing career
- Genre: Science fiction

Academic background
- Thesis: The Novels of Philip K. Dick (1982)
- Doctoral advisor: Donald Wesling
- Other advisor: Fredric Jameson

Academic work
- Discipline: English and American literature
- Sub-discipline: Science fiction
- Institutions: University of California, Davis; University of California, San Diego
- Notable works: Mars trilogy

Kim Stanley Robinson (born March 23, 1952) is an American science fiction writer best known for his Mars trilogy of novels. Many of his novels and stories have ecological, cultural, and political themes, featuring scientists as heroes. Robinson has won numerous awards, including the Hugo Award for Best Novel, the Nebula Award for Best Novel, and the World Fantasy Award. The Atlantic magazine has called Robinson's work "the gold standard of realistic, and highly literary, science-fiction writing." According to The New Yorker magazine, Robinson is "generally acknowledged as one of the greatest living science-fiction writers."

== Early life and education ==
Robinson was born in Waukegan, Illinois. He moved to Southern California as a child.

In 1974, he earned a BA in literature from the University of California, San Diego (UC San Diego). In 1975, he earned an MA in English from Boston University. In 1978, Robinson moved to Davis, California, to take a break from graduate studies at UC San Diego. During this period, he worked as a bookseller for Orpheus Books. He also taught freshman composition and other courses at the University of California, Davis.

In 1982, Robinson earned a PhD in English from UC San Diego. His original PhD advisor was literary critic and Marxist scholar Fredric Jameson, who had pointed Robinson toward works by science fiction author Philip K. Dick. Jameson described Dick to his student as "the greatest living American writer". Jameson moved to the University of California, Santa Cruz (UC Santa Cruz), so Robinson finished his doctoral thesis under the scholar Donald Wesling. Robinson's dissertation was titled The Novels of Philip K. Dick.

== Career ==
In 2009, Robinson was an instructor at the Clarion Workshop for science fiction and fantasy writing. In 2010, he was the guest of honor at the 68th World Science Fiction Convention, held in Melbourne. In April 2011, Robinson presented at the second annual Rethinking Capitalism conference, held at UC Santa Cruz. Among other topics, his talk addressed the cyclical nature of capitalism.

Robinson was appointed as a Muir Environmental Fellow in 2011 by John Muir College at UC San Diego.

In May 2026, Middlebury College awarded Robinson with an honorary Doctor of Humane Letters degree before his commencement speech for their class of 2026 graduation.

== Major themes ==
=== Nature and culture ===
The artist Sheldon Brown described Robinson's novels as ways to explore how nature and culture continuously reformulate one another:

- The Three Californias Trilogy as California in the future
- Washington, D.C., undergoing the impact of climate change in the Science in the Capital series
- Mars as a stand-in for Earth in the Mars trilogy, to think about re-engineering on a global scale, considering both social and natural conditions

=== Ecological sustainability ===
Virtually all of Robinson's novels have an ecological component; sustainability is one of his primary themes. (A strong contender for the primary theme would be the nature of a plausible utopia.) The Orange County trilogy is about how the technological realm intersects with the natural realm, highlighting the importance of keeping the two in balance. In the Mars trilogy, one of the principal divisions among the Mars population arises from dissenting views on terraforming. Colonists debate whether the barren Martian landscape has a similar ecological or spiritual value when compared with a living ecosphere such as Earth's. The novel Forty Signs of Rain has an entirely ecological thrust, taking global warming as its principal subject.

=== Economic and social justice ===
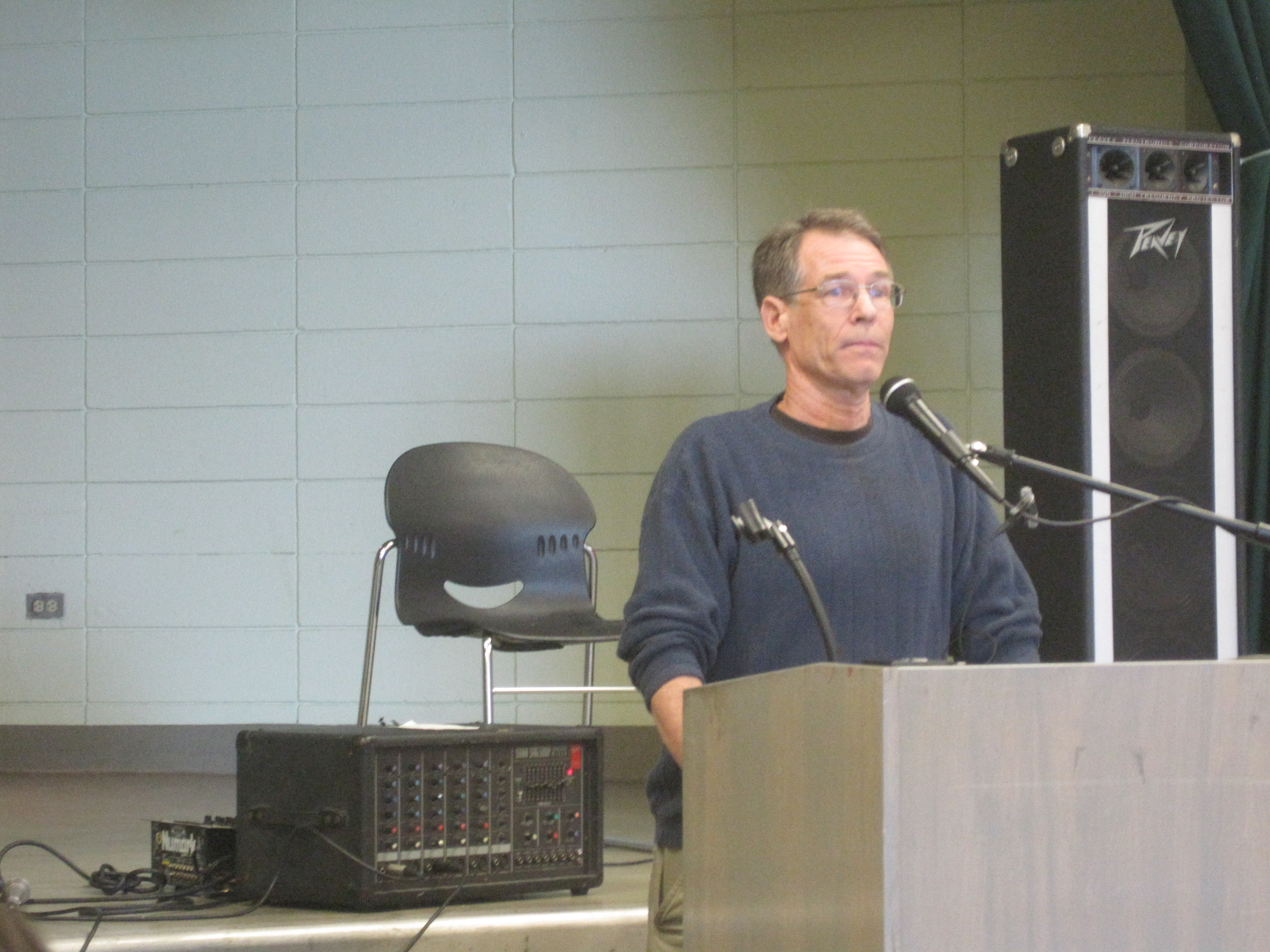
Kim Stanley Robinson speaking at the Bay Area Anarchist Bookfair on the social themes of his work

Robinson's work often explores alternatives to modern capitalism. In the Mars trilogy, it is argued that capitalism is an outgrowth of feudalism, which could be replaced in the future by a more democratic economic system. Worker ownership and cooperatives figure prominently in the novels Green Mars and Blue Mars as replacements for traditional corporations. The Orange County trilogy explores similar arrangements; Pacific Edge includes the idea of attacking the legal framework behind corporate domination to promote social egalitarianism.

Tim Kreider wrote in The New Yorker magazine that Robinson may be the greatest American political novelist, and he describes how Robinson uses the Mars trilogy as a template for a plausible utopia. His works have referred to real-world examples of economic organization that have been mentioned as alternatives to conventional capitalist structures. Those examples include the Kerala model in India and the Mondragon federation of worker cooperatives in Spain.

Robinson's writing also reflects an interest in economic models of degrowth (which rejects the growth-oriented basis of capitalism). Robert Markley has identified the work of the social theorist Murray Bookchin as an influence on Robinson's thinking, in addition to steady-state economics.

Robinson's work often portrays characters struggling to preserve and enhance the world around them, in an environment characterized by individualism and entrepreneurialism, often facing the political and economic authoritarianism of corporate power acting in this environment. Robinson has been described as anti-capitalist, and his work often portrays a form of frontier capitalism that promotes egalitarian ideals closely resembling socialist systems, but faced with a capitalism that is maintained by entrenched hegemonic corporations. In particular, his fictional Martian Constitution draws upon social democratic ideals explicitly emphasizing a community-participation element in political and economic life.

Robinson's works often portray the worlds of tomorrow similarly to the mythologized American frontier (or Old West), showing a sentimental affection for the freedom and wildness of the frontier. This aesthetic includes a preoccupation with competing models of political and economic organization.

The environmental, economic, and social themes in Robinson's oeuvre stand in marked contrast to the right-libertarian science fiction prevalent in much of the genre. (Robert A. Heinlein, Poul Anderson, Larry Niven, and Jerry Pournelle offer prominent examples.) Robinson has been described as "one of America's best-selling […] left-wing novelists", and his work has been called "probably the most successful attempt to reach a mass audience with an anti-capitalist utopian vision since Ursula K. Le Guin's 1974 novel, The Dispossessed".

=== Scientists as heroes ===
Robinson's work often features scientists as heroes. They are portrayed in a mundane way compared to most work featuring scientists: rather than being adventurers or action heroes, Robinson's scientists become essential because of research discoveries; networking and collaboration with other scientists; political lobbying; or becoming public figures. Robinson captures the joy of scientists as they work on projects that they care about.

Robert Markley has argued that Robinson "views science as the model for a utopian politics... Even in Robinson's novels that don't seem to be sci-fi, like Shaman, the inductive method, the collective search for greater knowledge about the world that can be put to use for the good for all, is front and center".

The Mars trilogy and the novel The Years of Rice and Salt rely heavily on the idea that scientists must take responsibility for ensuring public understanding and responsible use of their discoveries. Robinson's scientists often emerge as the best people to direct public policy on important environmental and technological questions, about which politicians are often ignorant.

=== Climate change and global warming ===
Other themes in Robinson's work reflect his focus on the environment: the imminent catastrophe of global warming and the need to limit greenhouse gas emissions in the present day. His 2012 novel 2312 explores the detrimental, long-term effects of climate change, which include food shortages, global instability, mass extinction, and a 7-meter (23-foot) sea level rise that has drowned many major coastal cities. The novel condemns the people of the period it calls "the Dithering", from 2005 to 2060, for failing to address climate change, thereby causing mass suffering and death in the future.

Robinson and his work accuse global capitalism of a failure to address climate change. In his 2017 novel New York 2140, Robinson explores the themes of climate change and global warming; the novel is set in the year 2140, when the New York City that he imagines is overwhelmed by a 50-foot (15 m) sea level rise that submerges half of the city. Climate change is also the focus of his Science in the Capital series and his 2020 novel The Ministry for the Future.

== Awards and honors ==
The asteroid 72432 Kimrobinson, discovered by astronomer Donald P. Pray in 2001, was named in Robinson's honor. The official naming citation was published by the Minor Planet Center on April 22, 2016 (M.P.C. 99892).

In 2008, Time magazine named Robinson a "Hero of the Environment" for his optimistic focus on the future.

Year	Award	Work honored for
1984	World Fantasy Award for Best Novella	"Black Air"
1984	Science Fiction Chronicle Readers Poll-novella	"Black Air"
1985	Locus Award for Best First Novel	The Wild Shore
1988	Nebula Award for Best Novella	"The Blind Geometer"
1988	Asimov's Reader Poll Novella	"Mother Goddess of the World"
1991	John W. Campbell Memorial Award for Best Science Fiction Novel	Pacific Edge
1991	Locus Award for Best Novella	"A Short, Sharp Shock"
1992	Science Fiction Chronicle Readers Poll Short Fiction	"Vinland the Dream"
1993	BSFA Award for Best Novel	Red Mars
1994	Hugo Award for Best Novel	Green Mars
1994	Locus Award for Best Science Fiction Novel	Green Mars
1994	Nebula Award for Best Novel	Red Mars
1997	Hugo Award for Best Novel	Blue Mars
1997	Locus Award for Best Science Fiction Novel	Blue Mars
1997	Ignotus Award-foreign novel	Red Mars
1998	Ignotus Award-foreign novel	Green Mars
1998	Prix Ozone SF novel, foreign	Blue Mars
1999	Seiun Awards foreign novel	Red Mars
2000	Locus Awards Best Collection	The Martians
2003	Locus Award for Best Science Fiction Novel	The Years of Rice and Salt
2013	Nebula Award for Best Novel	2312
2016	Robert A. Heinlein Award	Entire body of work
2018	Arthur C. Clarke Award for Imagination in Service to Society	Entire body of work

== Personal life ==
Robinson and his wife have two sons. Robinson has lived in Washington, D.C.; California; and Switzerland (during some of the 1980s). At times, Robinson was a stay-at-home dad. He later moved to a cohousing community in Davis, California.

Robinson has described himself as an avid backpacker, with California's Sierra Nevada serving as his home mountain range and a significant influence on his worldview.

Politically, Robinson identifies as a democratic socialist; in a February 2019 interview, he mentioned that he is a dues-paying member of the Democratic Socialists of America. He has also commented that libertarianism never "[made] any sense to me, nor sounds attractive as a principle."
