= Imagining Mars: A Literary History =

2011 non-fiction book by Robert Crossley

- Author: Robert Crossley
- Language: English
- Genre: Non-fiction
- Publisher: Wesleyan University Press
- Publication date: 2011
- Publication place: United States
- Pages: xvii + 353
- ISBN: 978-0-8195-6927-1
- OCLC: 495597233
- LC Class: PN3433.6 .C76 2011

Imagining Mars: A Literary History is a 2011 non-fiction book by science fiction scholar Robert Crossley. The book chronicles the history of Mars in fiction, and to a lesser extent in culture. The overarching thesis of the work is that the scientific understanding of Mars and the versions of the planet imagined in works of fiction have developed in parallel and influenced each other. It covers a timeframe spanning from the pre-telescope era up to the present day, especially the time period after 1877. Particular attention is paid to the influence of amateur astronomer Percival Lowell (1855–1916), who popularized the myth of Martian canals in the public consciousness, and science fiction author H. G. Wells (1866–1946) who wrote the seminal 1897 novel The War of the Worlds. The book charts how the depiction of Mars changed throughout the second half of the 1900s in response to successive advances in planetary science, while noting that some authors preferred to continue portraying the planet in a nostalgic way that was by then scientifically outdated.

The book received positive reviews upon release. Critics praised the depth and breadth of knowledge displayed, evidenced among other things by the inclusion of a large number of relatively obscure works. The interplay between science and fiction was found to be effectively illustrated. Crossley's inclusion of his personal assessments of literary merit was generally viewed as a positive; some reviewers perceived him to display a preference for hard science fiction. Also praised was the writing style, which was described as making the book not only appeal to science fiction scholars and fans but also be accessible to the general public. Some reviewers noted the lack of a bibliography listing the works cited in the book as a negative.

== Background ==
Robert Crossley (born in 1945) is a science fiction scholar and professor emeritus of English at the University of Massachusetts Boston. He had previously written about science fiction authors H. G. Wells (1866–1946) and especially Olaf Stapledon (1886–1950), including the 1994 biography Olaf Stapledon: Speaking for the Future. The process of researching and writing Imagining Mars spanned more than a decade.

Crossley had previously covered specific aspects of Mars in fiction in the 2000 essay "Sign, Symbol, Power: The New Martian Novel" and the 2004 Philological Quarterly article "H. G. Wells, Visionary Telescopes, and the 'Matter of Mars'", and would do so again in the 2012 essay "From Invasion to Liberation: Alternative Visions of Mars, Planet of War". Earlier book-length treatments of the subject by other authors include Robert Markley's 2005 Dying Planet: Mars in Science and the Imagination and Eric S. Rabkin's 2005 Mars: A Tour of the Human Imagination.

== Contents ==
The book contains a preface, fourteen chapters, an afterword, endnotes, and an index. The chapters are:

=== 1. "The Meaning of Mars" (1–19) ===
On the cultural significance of Mars across the centuries, with a brief overview of its shifting depiction in fiction. Crossley argues that "the literary and scientific imaginations collaborate with each other and exist in tension with each other". He describes Marjorie Hope Nicolson's 1948 study Voyages to the Moon as "the definitive history of Moon fantasies" and writes that Mars lacks a counterpart, with the closest attempt thus far being Robert Markley's 2005 book Dying Planet: Mars in Science and the Imagination. He divides the history of Mars observation into three eras, using a scheme devised by astronomy historian William Sheehan: the era of naked eye astronomy, Earth-based telescope observation, and the Space Age.

=== 2. "Dreamworlds of the Telescope" (20–36) ===
On the history of Mars observation between the invention of the telescope in the early 1600s and the 1877 opposition of Mars. Crossley discusses several works from this period that speculate or fantasize about the planet's conditions and possible inhabitants, including Bernard Le Bovier de Fontenelle's 1686 work Entretiens sur la pluralité des mondes, Emanuel Swedenborg's 1758 work De Telluribus in Mundo Nostro Solari, and the anonymously published 1839 novel A Fantastical Excursion into the Planets.

=== 3. "Inventing a New Mars" (37–67) ===
On the observations made during the 1877 opposition, and six books that were written in its wake. The main observation discussed is Italian astronomer Giovanni Schiaparelli's mistaken identification of straight lines on the Martian surface (actually optical illusions), which he called canali (literally channels), and which led to the myth of Martian canals. The books covered are Percy Greg's 1880 novel Across the Zodiac, W. S. Lach-Szyrma's 1883 novel Aleriel, or A Voyage to Other Worlds, William James Roe's 1887 novel Bellona's Husband: A Romance, Hugh MacColl's 1889 novel Mr. Stranger's Sealed Packet, Robert Cromie's 1890 novel A Plunge into Space, and Robert D. Braine's 1892 novel Messages from Mars, By Aid of the Telescope Plant.

=== 4. "Percival Lowell's Mars" (68–89) ===
On the influence of US amateur astronomer Percival Lowell on the popular conception of Mars. Lowell interpreted Schiaparelli's canali as artificial waterways, constructed by an advanced Martian civilization to stave off desertification. He wrote three non-fiction books on the subject—Mars in 1895, Mars and Its Canals in 1906, and Mars as the Abode of Life in 1908—popularizing his ideas about Mars and Martians among the general public. Says Crossley, "No figure is more central to the cultural and literary history of Mars in the twentieth century than Percival Lowell." His fellow astronomers were more skeptical, questioning not only Lowell's speculations about the conditions on Mars but also the existence of the canals themselves. Lowell died resolute in his convictions in 1916, by which time the canals had been abandoned as a serious scientific theory.

=== 5. "Mars and Utopia" (90–109) ===
On Mars as a setting for works of utopian fiction in the late 1800s and early 1900s. Crossley identifies feminist, socialist, and religious elements in the imagined ideal Martian societies. The influence of Schiaparelli and Lowell receives specific attention. Crossley highlights German science fiction writer Kurd Lasswitz's 1897 novel Auf zwei Planeten and Russian science fiction writer Alexander Bogdanov's 1908 novel Red Star as the most significant works in this tradition.

=== 6. "H. G. Wells and the Great Disillusionment" (110–128) ===
On the central position of H. G. Wells's 1897 novel The War of the Worlds in the history of Martian fiction. In Crossley's view, Wells' story displayed originality that set it apart from contemporary fiction about Mars in several different ways. Rather than being portrayed as essentially human and being noble creatures to emulate, Wells's Martians have a completely alien appearance and are evil—in Wells's words "intellects vast and cool and unsympathetic". Crossley also argues that unlike other Martian authors of the time, Wells was scarcely influenced by Lowell's ideas about planetary science, drawing instead primarily upon Charles Darwin's biological notion of evolution by natural selection. Crossley identifies the alien invasion story—which he notes as a departure from the usual scenario of a visit to Mars by humans—as a satirical critique of contemporary British colonialism in general and its devastating effects on the Aboriginal Tasmanians in particular. Of Garrett P. Serviss's unauthorized 1898 sequel Edison's Conquest of Mars, Crossley writes that "it is astonishingly impervious to Wells's anti-imperialist motive".

=== 7. "Mars and the Paranormal" (129–148) ===
On the interplay between the growing interest in Mars and in the paranormal in the late 1800s. The central figure in this is French author and astronomer Camille Flammarion and his 1889 novel Uranie. Also covered is Hélène Smith, a medium who claimed to be in communication with Mars. Crossley discusses some works of Martian fiction from this era that employ supernatural elements such as reincarnation, concluding that they for the most part lack literary merit.

=== 8. "Masculinist Fantasies" (149–167) ===
On a trend that emerged around the turn of the century of portraying fictional Mars as the setting for characteristically male-dominated adventure stories. Crossley acknowledges that the term "masculinism" is anachronistic here, but finds it fitting as he views the stories in question as standing in fundamental opposition to works of feminist science fiction such as the 1893 novel Unveiling a Parallel: A Romance by Alice Ilgenfritz Jones and Ella Robinson Merchant. Recurring features identified by Crossley include Martian princesses, colonialist and racist attitudes, and using Mars as a kind of stand-in for the bygone American frontier. Six books receive in-depth analysis: Gustavus W. Pope's 1894 novel Journey to Mars, Ellsworth Douglass's 1899 novel Pharaoh's Broker, George Griffith's 1901 novel A Honeymoon in Space, Edwin Lester Arnold's 1905 novel Lieut. Gullivar Jones: His Vacation, Edgar Rice Burroughs's 1912 novel A Princess of Mars (the first in his Barsoom series), and Marcianus Rossi's 1920 novel A Trip to Mars. The chapter also briefly covers works aimed specifically at teenage boys.

=== 9. "Quite in the Best Tradition" (168–194) ===
On Martian fiction in the 1920s and 1930s. Crossley notes an initial decrease in the popularity of Mars in this era, followed by an upswing beginning with the release of Olaf Stapledon's 1930 novel Last and First Men. He argues that the influence of Lowell was by this time largely supplanted by that of Wells, evidenced particularly by the alienness of the planet's inhabitants in works such as Stanley G. Weinbaum's 1934 short story "A Martian Odyssey". In Crossley's estimation, the central piece of Martian fiction in this era was C. S. Lewis's 1938 novel Out of the Silent Planet. Also discussed is Orson Welles's 1938 radio adaptation of The War of the Worlds.

=== 10. "On the Threshold of the Space Age" (195–221) ===
On Martian fiction in the 1940s and 1950s. By this time, advances in planetary science such as the failure of spectrographic analysis to detect oxygen in the Martian atmosphere had rendered previous notions of a habitable Mars obsolete. Crossley describes it as a kind of transitional era, when "romantic Mars [grew] increasingly untenable and realistic Mars still [remained] largely unpalatable to the literary imagination". He compares and contrasts Ray Bradbury using Mars as a vehicle for social commentary while paying scant attention to scientific realities in the 1950 fix-up novel The Martian Chronicles and Arthur C. Clarke striving to portray the planet realistically in the 1951 novel The Sands of Mars.

=== 11. "Retrograde Visions" (222–242) ===
On the response to early Space Age discoveries about Mars, in particular the fiction that continued to portray the planet in a nostalgic way that was by then scientifically outdated. Crossley identifies Robert A. Heinlein's 1961 novel Stranger in a Strange Land and Walter Tevis's 1963 novel The Man Who Fell to Earth as revisitations of the "man from Mars" motif common in the 1890s. Philip K. Dick's 1964 novels The Three Stigmata of Palmer Eldritch and Martian Time-Slip depict Mars as it had been imagined decades earlier, complete with the long-discredited canals. The flyby of Mars by Mariner 4 in 1965 revealed the planet to be even more barren and hostile to life than had previously been realized. Some authors rejected the implications for fiction writing, such as Leigh Brackett who declared in the foreword to The Coming of the Terrans (a 1967 collection of earlier short stories) that "in the affairs of men and Martians, mere fact runs a poor second to Truth, which is mighty and shall prevail". Others embraced them, such as Czech science fiction writer Luděk Pešek whose 1970 novel The Earth Is Near depicts the members of an astrobiological expedition on Mars driven to despair by the realization that their search for life there is futile. Following the arrival of the Viking probes in 1976, the so-called "Face on Mars" superseded the Martian canals as the most central symbol of nostalgic depictions of Mars.

=== 12. "Mars Remade" (243–262) ===
On the emergence of the terraforming theme in Martian fiction in the late 1970s and 1980s. Crossley credits Frederick Turner with being an early voice on this subject in the post-Viking age in his 1978 novel A Double Shadow, and discusses his 1988 epic poem Genesis in depth. Also covered are the early works of Kim Stanley Robinson depicting the terraforming of Mars: the 1982 short story "Exploring Fossil Canyon", the 1984 novel Icehenge, and the 1985 short story "Green Mars".

=== 13. "Being There" (263–283) ===
On the theme of human presence on Mars in 1990s Martian fiction. Crossley attributes the increased interest in the topic at this time to a confluence of factors: the Space Exploration Initiative which proposed to complete a human mission to Mars by 2019, announced by US president George H. W. Bush in 1989; the advocacy group Mars Underground and its key figure Robert Zubrin's 1990 Mars Direct proposal for getting to Mars; the 1987–1991 construction of Biosphere 2, a closed ecological system largely perceived by the public as a way to demonstrate how humans could survive on Mars; and the launch of the Mars exploration probe Mars Pathfinder in 1996. Crossley identifies several recurring motifs in the fiction of this era, including "the rethinking of Mars as home rather than as outpost or colony", conflicts between emerging Martian societies and Earth, and revisiting the utopian theme found in the Martian fiction of a century before—albeit here the creation rather than discovery of an ideal society on Mars.

=== 14. "Becoming Martian" (284–306) ===
On the theme of humans taking on the identity of being denizens of Mars in 1990s Martian fiction. Crossley investigates the relationship in these stories between terraforming and "areoforming"—between humans changing Mars and Mars, in turn, changing humans. He writes that while earlier works such as Frederik Pohl's 1976 Man Plus might occasionally use the concept of transforming humans physically to live on Mars, fiction in this era focused more on the psychological transformation caused by living on the red planet. The majority of the chapter covers Kim Stanley Robinson's 1993–1996 Mars trilogy in depth.

=== Afterword: "Mars under Construction" (307–309) ===
On how Mars fiction might develop in the years to come. Ian McDonald's 2002 short story "The Old Cosmonaut and the Construction Worker Dream of Mars" is used as a guiding example. Crossley concludes that "Where imagined Mars will go as the twenty-first century unfolds cannot be prophesied, because—undoubtedly—improbable, original, and masterful talents will work new variations on the matter of Mars."

== Reception ==
John Gilbey, in a March 2011 review for Times Higher Education, praised Crossley's decision to not solely focus on the most well-known works of Martian fiction such as H. G. Wells's 1897 novel The War of the Worlds and Kim Stanley Robinson's 1992–1996 Mars trilogy, but to also include works that have grown less widely recognized since their initial publication. In his view, the book effectively shows how the portrayal of Mars in fiction has changed over time. He highlighted Crossley's observation that the interplay between astronomical progress and popular imagination means that a significant proportion of early non-fiction speculation about Mars (and Martians) comes across as science fiction to the modern reader. Moreover, according to Gilbey, the "thoughtful and engaging" coverage of "a huge number of literary strands" provides insight into the cultural context in which each of the discussed works was written.

Catherine Ramsdell reviewed the book for PopMatters in March 2011, writing that it would dispel any notion that science fiction is a low form of art. She commended Crossley's combination of writing about various aspects of real-world history, summarizing the plots of discussed works, and literary criticism. In Ramsdell's view, the way these aspects are interwoven in the text works to effectively further the reader's understanding of the overarching subject matter. She highlighted that although most of the discussed texts were written post-1877, Crossley goes further back and covers the connection between John Milton's 1667 epic poem Paradise Lost and Christiaan Huygens's posthumously-published 1698 work Cosmotheoros, commenting "Welcome to the world of academic science fiction". Ramsdell also noted that Crossley appears to have a lower opinion of Ray Bradbury's 1950 fix-up novel The Martian Chronicles and Robert A. Heinlein's 1961 novel Stranger in a Strange Land than most, preferring David G. Compton's 1966 novel Farewell, Earth's Bliss as this era's literary representation of Mars.

Bruce A. Beatie wrote in the Spring 2011 issue of SFRA Review that the book is "well written, thorough and insightful in its evaluations". Because Imagining Mars mainly covers the post-1877 era, Beatie found Eric S. Rabkin's somewhat briefer 2005 book Mars: A Tour of the Human Imagination—whose scope overlaps with that of Crossley's book—to provide "a convenient preface". He wrote that while Crossley mainly points to Marjorie Hope Nicolson's 1948 study Voyages to the Moon as a precursor to his work, the subject matter of Imagining Mars has more in common with Karl Siegfried Guthke's 1983 book The Last Frontier: Imagining Other Worlds from the Copernican Revolution to Modern Science Fiction. He found the writing style to be accessible to the general public, not just science fiction scholars and fans, commenting that this is in contrast to Guthke's work but shared with Nicolson's. Beatie appreciated the inclusion of more obscure works in addition to the "canonical" ones, finding the coverage of Luděk Pešek's 1970 novel The Earth Is Near in chapter 11 and the works of Frederick Turner in chapter 12 to be particularly interesting. He also highlighted chapter 6 as "an excellent piece of interpretive and contextual criticism". He commented that because the book is not exhaustive in terms of the works covered, but instead investigates the interplay between science and fiction, Imagining Mars is not a reference work but rather—in Beatie's estimation—"a true literary history". Beatie found the only serious flaw to be the lack of a bibliography.

Ryder W. Miller, writing in the Inklings-profiled Mythprint in March 2012, commended the depth and breadth of the knowledge on display. On the subject, Miller commented that the book contains "one hundred pages of exploration of the predecessors of H. G. Wells's The War of the Worlds where the story begins for most readers" and noted that many of the books discussed are difficult to come by for the typical consumer. On Crossley's critical assessments, Miller wrote that "Crossley does have his favorites and appears to have a bias towards terraforming the planet." Sanford Schwartz, writing in the similarly-oriented Sehnsucht: The C. S. Lewis Journal in 2012, called the book a "masterly new study of our perpetual fascination with Mars". On C. S. Lewis's 1938 novel Out of the Silent Planet, Schwartz agreed with Crossley's overall positive assessment, but found his criticism of Lewis's alleged pro-Christian and anti-science bias to be exaggerated. Overall, Schwartz found Imagining Mars to be a valuable resource for providing the cultural, scientific, and literary background information necessary for placing Lewis's work (and others) in the proper historical context.

D. Harlan Wilson gave the book a positive review in Extrapolation in June 2012, describing it as "nothing less than a magnum opus of literary criticism on the subject" and comparing it favourably to Robert Markley's 2005 book Dying Planet: Mars in Science and the Imagination. In Wilson's opinion, Crossley "demonstrates an impressive breadth of research alongside thoughtful commentary". He also wrote that the book gave him a better understanding of the central role fiction about Mars has played in the broader science fiction genre, influencing works set both on the red planet and elsewhere. He particularly praised the attention paid in chapter 5 to historically-significant yet comparatively obscure works like the 1893 novel Unveiling a Parallel: A Romance by Alice Ilgenfritz Jones and Ella Robinson Merchant and Alexander Bogdanov's 1908 novel Red Star. Wilson further highlighted the accessibility of the language used as a positive, writing that the book would appeal strongly to science fiction scholars and fans alike, as well as being of interest to "anybody interested in the cultural history of the west".

Brooks Landon called the book "wonderfully written and impressively comprehensive" in a July 2012 review in Science Fiction Studies. The review also covered the 2011 essay collection Visions of Mars: Essays on the Red Planet in Fiction and Science edited by Howard V. Hendrix, George Slusser, and Eric S. Rabkin (the proceedings volume of the 2008 Eaton Science Fiction Conference, the theme of which was "Chronicling Mars"); Landon noted some parallels between the two volumes, including chapter 11 in Imagining Mars being an extended version of an essay in Visions of Mars authored by Crossley. He praised Crossley's readings of the texts analysed and the way these readings reinforce Crossley's central thesis of science and fiction having a relationship of reciprocal influence when it comes to Mars. He commended the large volume of primary literature covered, as well as its breadth in terms of ranging from famous works to obscure ones. On the latter point, he found the coverage of largely-forgotten works in chapter 3 "informative and frequently surprising". In Landon's view, chapters 9 and 10 "form a kind of vital center" of the book, where Crossley skilfully provides context for the works of Lewis, Bradbury, and their contemporaries. On chapter 13, he commented that "it is clear that Crossley faults [Greg Bear's 1993 novel] Moving Mars [...] for its 'allegiance to romantic plotting, to fantasy rather than scientific realism'". He also wrote that while the afterword cautions against viewing Robinson's Mars trilogy as the ultimate endpoint of Martian fiction, he found this caveat to be significantly undercut by the lengthy and laudatory coverage of the trilogy in the preceding final chapter, commenting that the book "effectively ends with a love song to Robinson". Landon concluded that Imagining Mars is not only a great book but an important one, inasmuch as it "presents a compelling case that 'Mars matters'".

Thomas J. Morrissey reviewed the book for the Journal of the Fantastic in the Arts in 2012, calling it a "banquet" compared to the "smorgasbord" of Visions of Mars, and declaring both to be equally indispensable texts on the topic as Markley's Dying Planet. In Morrissey's view, the book's contents "require all of the 309 pages they fill". He praised the inclusion of works that may be obscure or poorly-written but are nevertheless important for attaining a complete understanding of the topic. He highlighted Crossley's coverage of Percival Lowell and Camille Flammarion as a good explainer on the influence incorrect ideas Mars had on the public perception of the planet and its depiction in fiction. Morrissey further viewed the analysis of Turner's 1988 epic poem Genesis and the chapter covering Robinson's Mars trilogy as additional highlights of the book. On the other hand, he disagreed with Crossley's criticism of Bradbury's writing style in The Martian Chronicles, which Crossley found to be an example of purple prose. Morrissey found the only significant drawback of the book to be the lack of a bibliography listing the works cited. He also deemed the price of $40 to be surprisingly affordable, particularly in light of the inclusion of several illustrations printed in colour.

Patrick Parrinder, reviewing the book for The British Society for Literature and Science, wrote that it exhibits the "grace, skill and wide-ranging scholarship familiar from [Crossley's] earlier works". On the parallels to Nicolson's Voyages to the Moon, he noted that Nicolson focused mostly on works written prior to 1800 whereas Crossley almost exclusively covers the history of Martian fiction following Giovanni Schiaparelli's announcement of the discovery of the illusory Martian canals during the opposition of Mars in 1877. Parrinder found the portion of the book that focuses on the fiction written in the wake of the Mariner and Viking probes to Mars between 1965 and 1976, when the inhospitable conditions of the planet became better understood and terraforming started to emerge as the dominant theme in Martian fiction, to be particularly interesting to read. On the more critical side, he found the selection of recent works of fiction to be questionable, noting Stephen Baxter's 1996 novel Voyage as a high-profile omission. He also found himself disagreeing with some of Crossley's assessments of the discussed works' literary quality, but nevertheless considered the inclusion of such assessments to be an overall positive. Parrinder concluded that "barring new discoveries this is the definitive literary history of a planet that has long been prospected by the human imagination".
