= History of Mars observation =

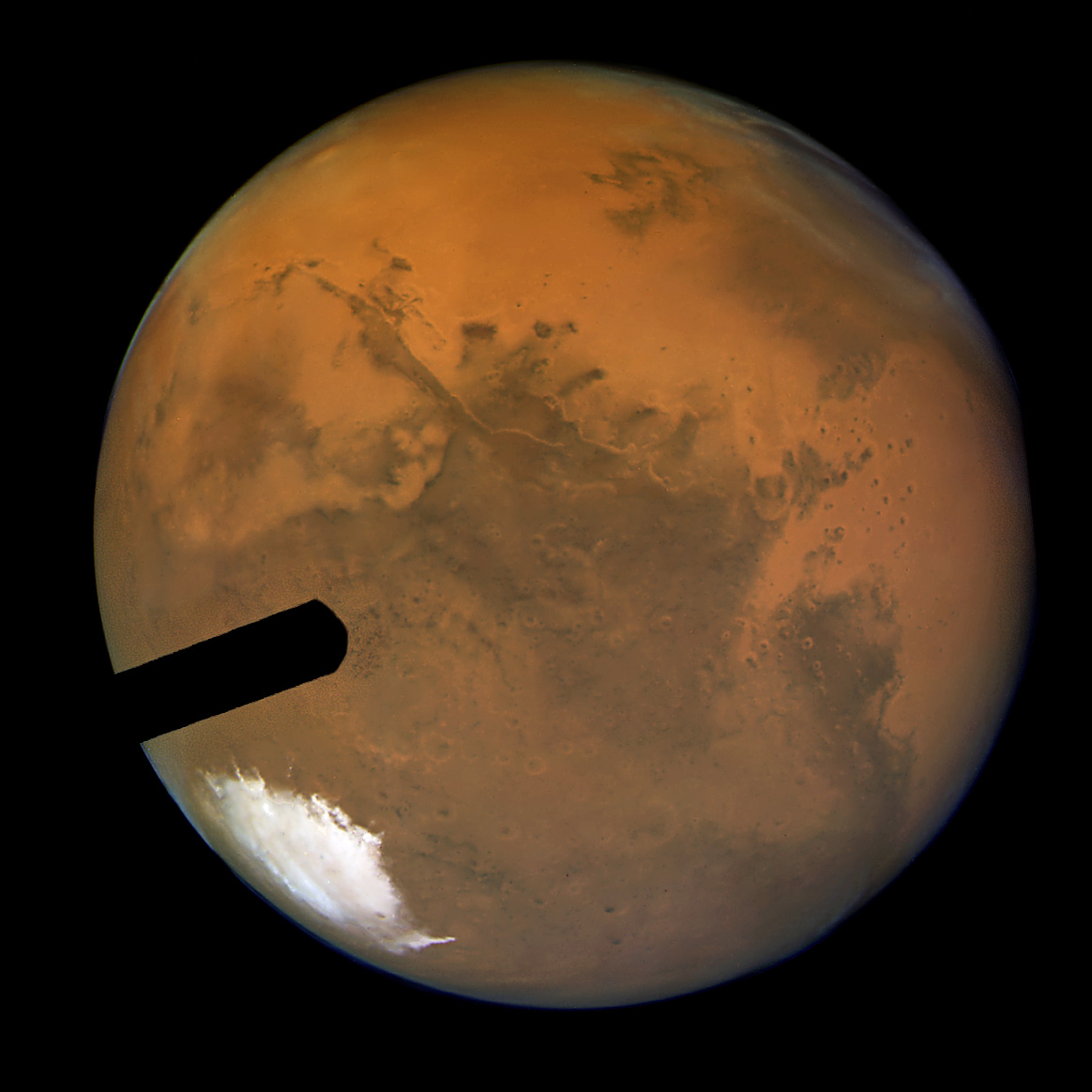
Hubble's sharpest view of Mars: Although the ACS “Fastie finger” intrudes, it achieved a spatial scale of 5 miles, or 8 kilometres per pixel at full resolution.

The history of Mars observation is about the recorded history of observation of the planet Mars. Some of the early records of Mars's observation date back to the era of the ancient Egyptian astronomers in the 2nd millennium BCE. Chinese records about the motions of Mars appeared before the founding of the Zhou dynasty (1045 BCE). Detailed observations of the position of Mars were made by Babylonian astronomers who developed arithmetic techniques to predict the future position of the planet. The ancient Greek philosophers and Hellenistic astronomers developed a geocentric model to explain the planet's motions. Measurements of Mars's angular diameter can be found in ancient Greek and Indian texts. In the 16th century, Nicolaus Copernicus proposed a heliocentric model for the Solar System in which the planets follow circular orbits about the Sun. This was revised by Johannes Kepler, yielding an elliptic orbit for Mars that more accurately fitted the observational data.

The first telescopic observation of Mars was by Galileo Galilei in 1609. Within a century, astronomers discovered distinct albedo features on the planet, including the dark patch Syrtis Major Planum and polar ice caps. They were able to determine the planet's rotation period and axial tilt. These observations were primarily made during the time intervals when the planet was located in opposition to the Sun, at which points Mars made its closest approaches to the Earth. Better telescopes developed early in the 19th century allowed permanent Martian albedo features to be mapped in detail. The first crude map of Mars was published in 1840, followed by more refined maps from 1877 onward. When astronomers mistakenly thought they had detected the spectroscopic signature of water in the Martian atmosphere, the idea of life on Mars became popularized among the public. Percival Lowell believed he could see a network of artificial canals on Mars. These linear features later proved to be an optical illusion, and the atmosphere was found to be too thin to support an Earth-like environment.

Yellow clouds on Mars have been observed since the 1870s, which Eugène M. Antoniadi suggested were windblown sand or dust. During the 1920s, the range of Martian surface temperature was measured; it ranged from −85 to 7 °C (−121 to 45 °F). The planetary atmosphere was found to be arid with only trace amounts of oxygen and water. In 1947, Gerard Kuiper showed that the thin Martian atmosphere contained extensive carbon dioxide; roughly double the quantity found in Earth's atmosphere. The first standard nomenclature for Mars albedo features was adopted in 1960 by the International Astronomical Union. Since the 1960s, multiple robotic spacecraft have been sent to explore Mars from orbit and the surface. The planet has remained under observation by ground and space-based instruments across a broad range of the electromagnetic spectrum. The discovery of meteorites on Earth that originated on Mars has allowed laboratory examination of the chemical conditions on the planet.

== Earliest records ==
As Earth passes Mars, the latter planet will temporarily appear to reverse its motion across the sky.

The existence of Mars as a wandering object in the night sky was recorded by ancient Egyptian astronomers. By the 2nd millennium BCE they were familiar with the apparent retrograde motion of the planet, in which it appears to move in the opposite direction across the sky from its normal progression. Mars was portrayed on the ceiling of the tomb of Seti I, on the Ramesseum ceiling, and in the Senenmut star map. The last is the oldest known star map, being dated to 1534 BCE based on the position of the planets.

By the period of the Neo-Babylonian Empire, Babylonian astronomers were making systematic observations of the positions and behavior of the planets. For Mars, they knew, for example, that the planet made 37 synodic periods, or 42 circuits of the zodiac, every 79 years. The Babylonians invented arithmetic methods for making minor corrections to the predicted positions of the planets. This technique was primarily derived from timing measurements—such as when Mars rose above the horizon, rather than from the less accurately known position of the planet on the celestial sphere.

Chinese records of the appearances and motions of Mars appear before the founding of the Zhou dynasty (1045 BCE), and by the Qin dynasty (221 BCE) astronomers maintained close records of planetary conjunctions, including those of Mars. Occultations of Mars by Venus were noted in 368, 375, and 405 CE. The period and motion of the planet's orbit was known in detail during the Tang dynasty (618 CE).

The early astronomy of ancient Greece was influenced by knowledge transmitted from the Mesopotamian culture. Thus, the Babylonians associated Mars with Nergal, their god of war and pestilence, and the Greeks connected the planet with their god of war, Ares. During this period, the motions of the planets were of little interest to the Greeks; Hesiod's Works and Days (c. 650 BCE) makes no mention of the planets.

== Orbital models ==
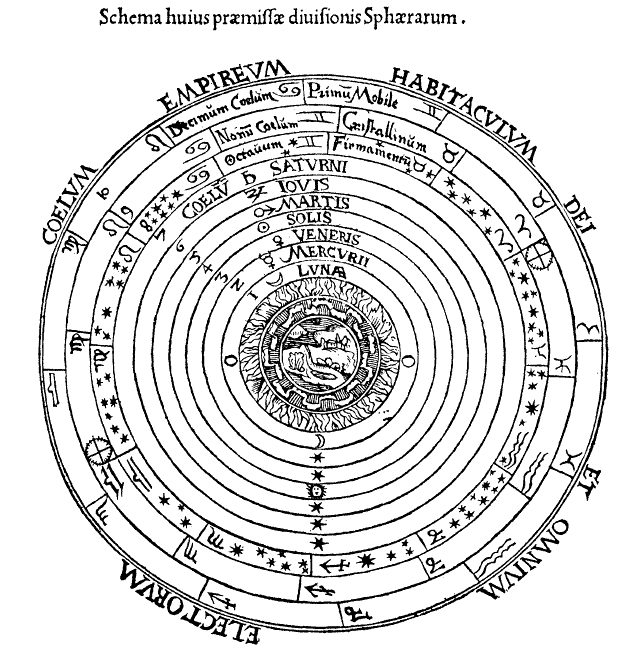
Geocentric model of the Universe.

The Greeks used the word planēton to refer to the seven celestial bodies that moved with respect to the background stars and they held a geocentric view that these bodies moved about the Earth. In his work, The Republic (X.616E–617B), the Greek philosopher Plato provided the oldest known statement defining the order of the planets in Greek astronomical tradition. His list, in order of the nearest to the most distant from the Earth, was as follows: the Moon, Sun, Venus, Mercury, Mars, Jupiter, Saturn, and the fixed stars. In his dialogue Timaeus, Plato proposed that the progression of these objects across the skies depended on their distance, so that the most distant object moved the slowest.

Aristotle, a student of Plato, observed an occultation of Mars by the Moon on 4 May 357 BCE. From this he concluded that Mars must lie further from the Earth than the Moon. He noted that other such occultations of stars and planets had been observed by the Egyptians and Babylonians. Aristotle used this observational evidence to support the Greek sequencing of the planets. His work De Caelo presented a model of the universe in which the Sun, Moon, and planets circle about the Earth at fixed distances. A more sophisticated version of the geocentric model was developed by the Greek astronomer Hipparchus when he proposed that Mars moved along a circular track called the epicycle that, in turn, orbited about the Earth along a larger circle called the deferent.

In Roman Egypt during the 2nd century CE, Claudius Ptolemaeus (Ptolemy) attempted to address the problem of the orbital motion of Mars. Observations of Mars had shown that the planet appeared to move 40% faster on one side of its orbit than the other, in conflict with the Aristotelian model of uniform motion. Ptolemy modified the model of planetary motion by adding a point offset from the center of the planet's circular orbit about which the planet moves at a uniform rate of rotation. He proposed that the order of the planets, by increasing distance, was: the Moon, Mercury, Venus, Sun, Mars, Jupiter, Saturn, and the fixed stars. Ptolemy's model and his collective work on astronomy was presented in the multi-volume collection Almagest, which became the authoritative treatise on Western astronomy for the next fourteen centuries.

In 1543, Nicolaus Copernicus published a heliocentric model in his work De revolutionibus orbium coelestium. This approach placed the Earth in an orbit around the Sun between the circular orbits of Venus and Mars. His model successfully explained why the planets Mars, Jupiter and Saturn were on the opposite side of the sky from the Sun whenever they were in the middle of their retrograde motions. Copernicus was able to sort the planets into their correct heliocentric order based solely on the period of their orbits about the Sun. His theory gradually gained acceptance among European astronomers, particularly after the publication of the Prutenic Tables by the German astronomer Erasmus Reinhold in 1551, which were computed using the Copernican model.

On October 13, 1590, the German astronomer Michael Maestlin observed an occultation of Mars by Venus. One of his students, Johannes Kepler, quickly became an adherent to the Copernican system. After the completion of his education, Kepler became an assistant to the Danish nobleman and astronomer, Tycho Brahe. With access granted to Tycho's detailed observations of Mars, Kepler was set to work mathematically assembling a replacement to the Prutenic Tables. After repeatedly failing to fit the motion of Mars into a circular orbit as required under Copernicanism, he succeeded in matching Tycho's observations by assuming the orbit was an ellipse and the Sun was located at one of the foci. His model became the basis for Kepler's laws of planetary motion, which were published in his multi-volume work Epitome Astronomiae Copernicanae (Epitome of Copernican Astronomy) between 1615 and 1621.

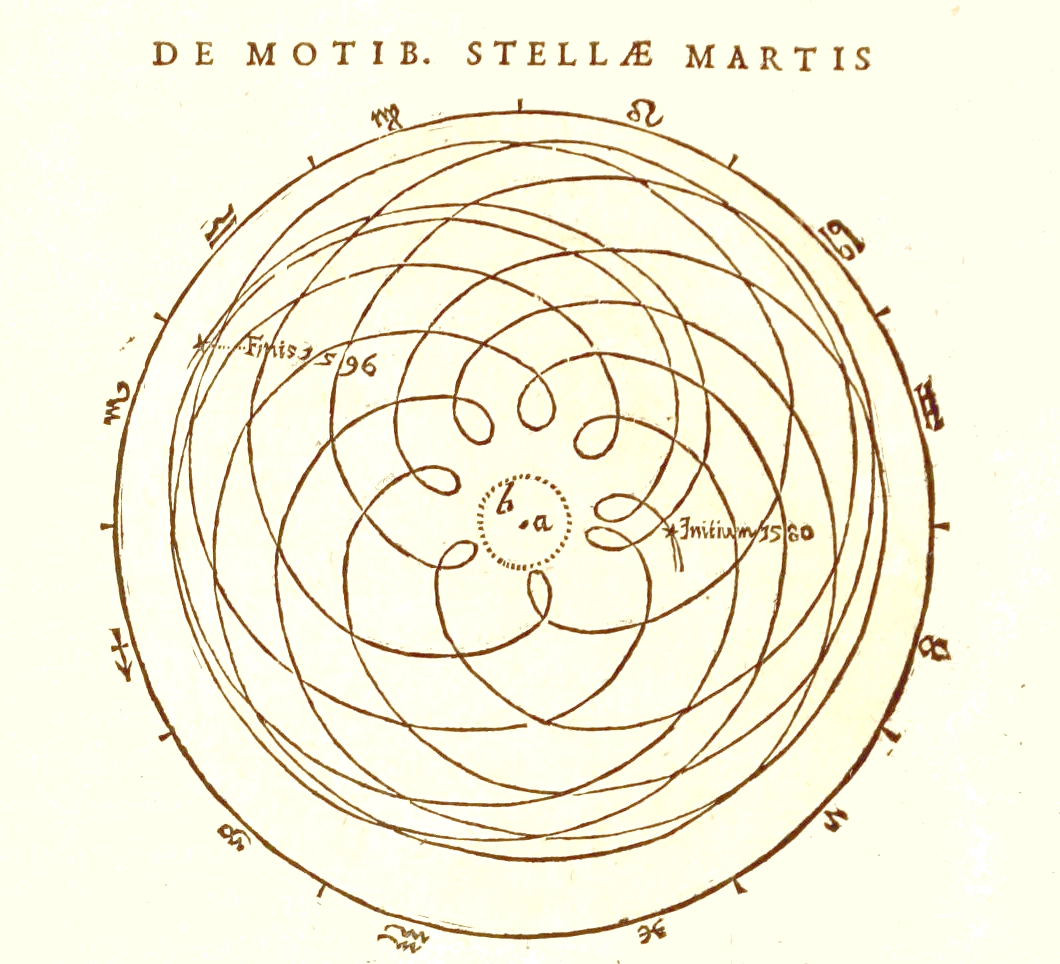
Diagram of the geocentric trajectory of Mars through several periods of apparent retrograde motion in Johannes Kepler's Astronomia Nova (1609)

== Early telescope observations ==
At its closest approach, the angular size of Mars is 25 arcseconds (a unit of degree); this is much too small for the naked eye to resolve. Hence, prior to the invention of the telescope, nothing was known about the planet besides its red hue and its position on the sky. Telescopes appeared in 1608 and in September 1610 the Italian scientist Galileo Galilei indicated in his records that he began observing Mars through a telescope. This instrument was too primitive to display any surface detail on the planet, so he set the goal of seeing if Mars exhibited phases of partial darkness similar to Venus or the Moon. Although uncertain of his success, by December he did note that Mars had shrunk in angular size. Polish astronomer Johannes Hevelius succeeded in observing a phase of Mars in 1645.

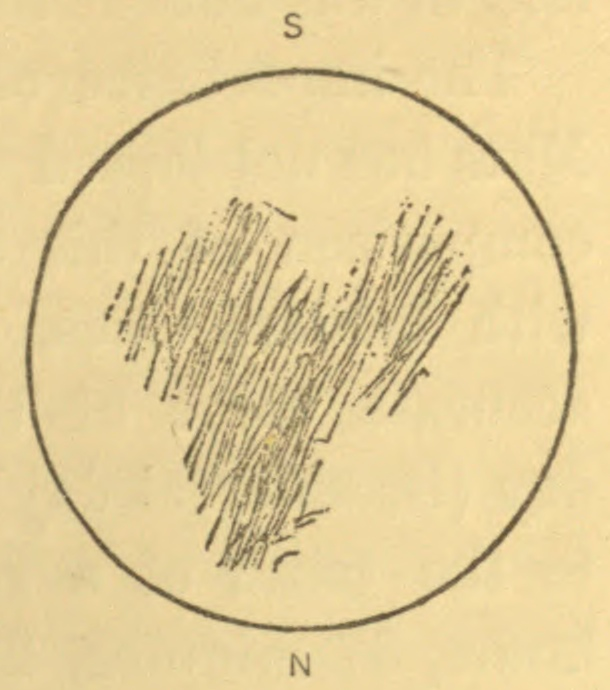
First drawn record of Martian features (Manuscript K), by Christiaan Huygens, observed on the 28th of November 1659. The feature is probably Syrtis Major Planum. Huygens calculated from the moving of the features the rotation of Mars.

In 1636 Francesco Fontana drew the first telescopic observation of Mars, but noted no actual features. In 1644, the Italian Jesuit Daniello Bartoli reported seeing two darker patches on Mars. During the oppositions of 1651, 1653 and 1655, when the planet made its closest approaches to the Earth, the Italian astronomer Giovanni Battista Riccioli and his student Francesco Maria Grimaldi noted patches of differing reflectivity on Mars. The first person to draw Mars with observed actual features was the Dutch astronomer Christiaan Huygens. On November 28, 1659, he made an illustration of Mars that showed the distinct dark region now known as Syrtis Major Planum, and possibly one of the polar ice caps. The same year, he succeeded in measuring the rotation period of the planet, giving it as approximately 24 hours. He made a rough estimate of the diameter of Mars, guessing that it is about 60% of the size of the Earth, which compares well with the modern value of 53%. Perhaps the first definitive mention of Mars's southern polar ice cap was by the Italian astronomer Giovanni Domenico Cassini, in 1666. That same year, he used observations of the surface markings on Mars to determine a rotation period of 24^{h} 40^{m}. This differs from the currently-accepted value by less than three minutes. In 1672, Huygens noticed a fuzzy white cap at the north pole.

After Cassini became the first director of the Paris Observatory in 1671, he tackled the problem of the physical scale of the Solar System. The relative size of the planetary orbits was known from Kepler's third law, so what was needed was the actual size of one of the planet's orbits. For this purpose, the position of Mars was measured against the background stars from different points on the Earth, thereby measuring the diurnal parallax of the planet. During this year, the planet was moving past the point along its orbit where it was nearest to the Sun (a perihelic opposition), which made this a particularly close approach to the Earth. Cassini and Jean Picard determined the position of Mars from Paris, while the French astronomer Jean Richer made measurements from Cayenne, South America. Although these observations were hampered by the quality of the instruments, the parallax computed by Cassini came within 10% of the correct value. The English astronomer John Flamsteed made comparable measurement attempts and had similar results.

In 1704, Italian astronomer Jacques Philippe Maraldi "made a systematic study of the southern cap and observed that it underwent" variations as the planet rotated. This indicated that the cap was not centered on the pole. He observed that the size of the cap varied over time. The German-born British astronomer Sir William Herschel began making observations of the planet Mars in 1777, particularly of the planet's polar caps. In 1781, he noted that the south cap appeared "extremely large", which he ascribed to that pole being in darkness for the past twelve months. By 1784, the southern cap appeared much smaller, thereby suggesting that the caps vary with the planet's seasons and thus were made of ice. In 1781, he estimated the rotation period of Mars as 24^{h} 39^{m} 21.67^{s} and measured the axial tilt of the planet's poles to the orbital plane as 28.5°. He noted that Mars had a "considerable but moderate atmosphere, so that its inhabitants probably enjoy a situation in many respects similar to ours". Between 1796 and 1809, the French astronomer Honoré Flaugergues noticed obscurations of Mars, suggesting "ochre-colored veils" covered the surface. This may be the earliest report of yellow clouds or storms on Mars.

== Geographical period ==
At the start of the 19th century, improvements in the size and quality of telescope optics proved a significant advance in observation capability. Most notable among these enhancements was the two-component achromatic lens of the German optician Joseph von Fraunhofer that essentially eliminated coma—an optical effect that can distort the outer edge of the image. By 1812, Fraunhofer had succeeded in creating an achromatic objective lens 190 mm (7.5 in) in diameter. The size of this primary lens is the main factor in determining the light gathering ability and resolution of a refracting telescope. During the opposition of Mars in 1830, the German astronomers Johann Heinrich Mädler and Wilhelm Beer used a 95 mm (3.7 in) Fraunhofer refracting telescope to launch an extensive study of the planet. They chose a feature located 8° south of the equator as their point of reference. (This was later named the Sinus Meridiani, and it would become the zero meridian of Mars.) During their observations, they established that most of Mars's surface features were permanent, and more precisely determined the planet's rotation period. In 1840, Mädler combined ten years of observations to draw the first map of Mars. Rather than giving names to the various markings, Beer and Mädler simply designated them with letters; thus Meridian Bay (Sinus Meridiani) was feature "a".

Working at the Vatican Observatory during the opposition of Mars in 1858, Italian astronomer Angelo Secchi noticed a large blue triangular feature, which he named the "Blue Scorpion". This same seasonal cloud-like formation was seen by English astronomer J. Norman Lockyer in 1862, and it has been viewed by other observers. During the 1862 opposition, Dutch astronomer Frederik Kaiser produced drawings of Mars. By comparing his illustrations to those of Huygens and the English natural philosopher Robert Hooke, he was able to further refine the rotation period of Mars. His value of 24^{h} 37^{m} 22.6^{s} is accurate to within a tenth of a second.

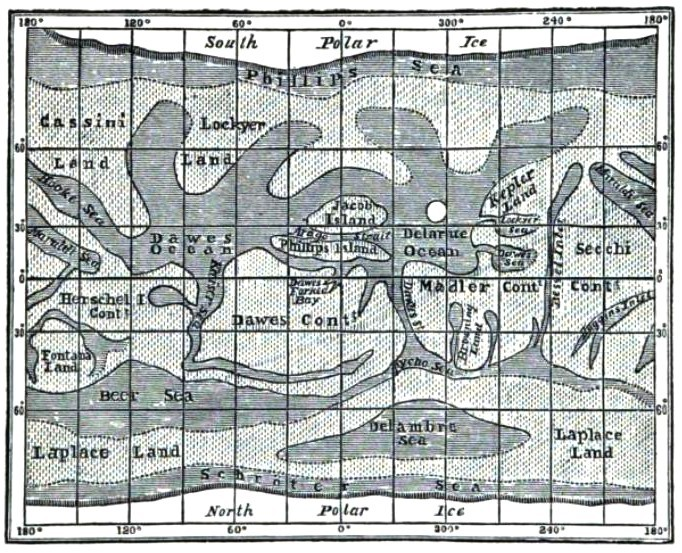
A later version of Proctor's map of Mars, published in 1905

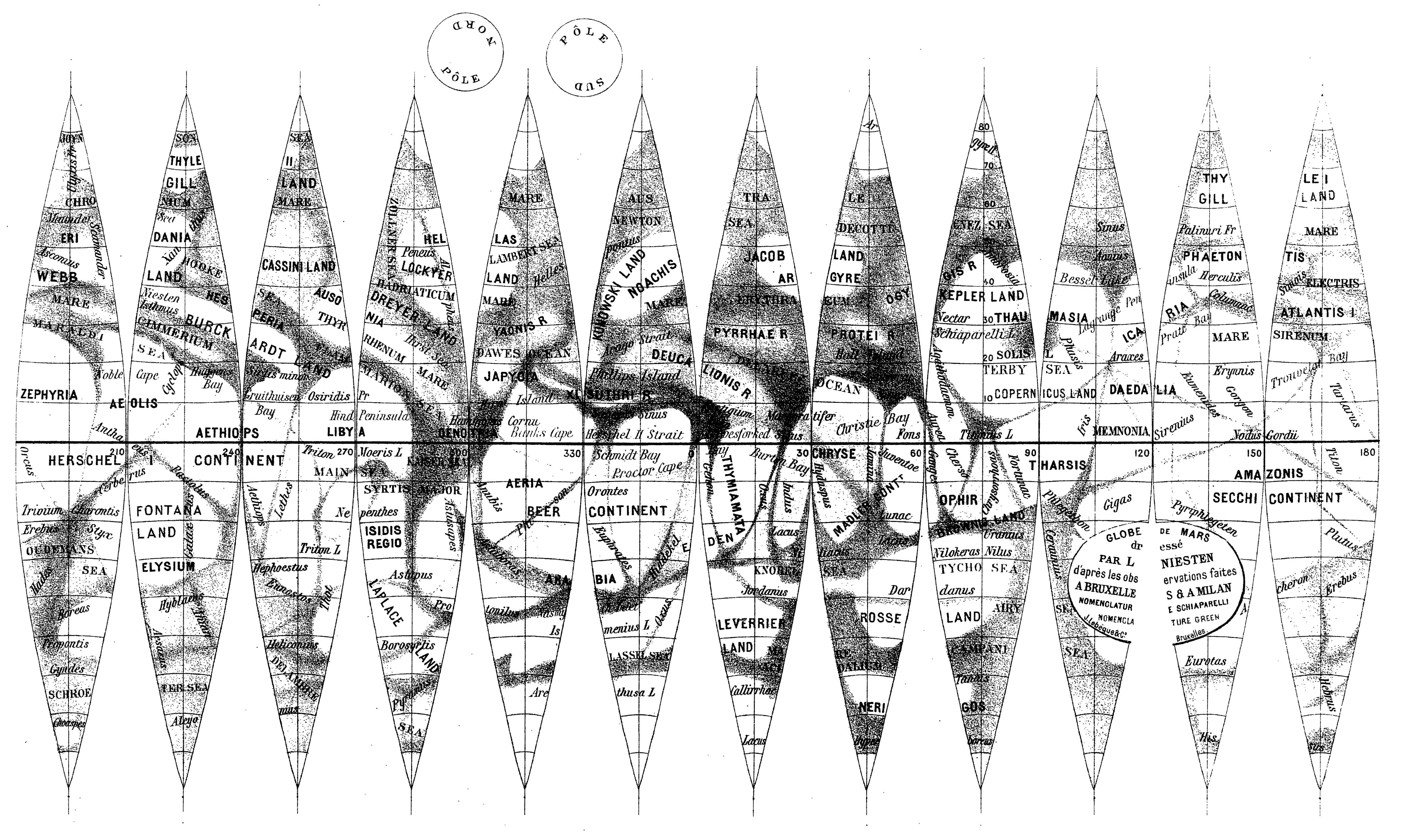
1892 atlas of Mars by the Belgian astronomer Louis Niesten

Father Secchi produced some of the first color illustrations of Mars in 1863. He used the names of famous explorers for the distinct features. In 1869, he observed two dark linear features on the surface that he referred to as canali, which is Italian for 'channels' or 'grooves'. In 1867, English astronomer Richard A. Proctor created a more detailed map of Mars based on the 1864 drawings of English astronomer William R. Dawes. Proctor named the various lighter or darker features after astronomers, past and present, who had contributed to the observations of Mars. During the same decade, comparable maps and nomenclature were produced by the French astronomer Camille Flammarion and the English astronomer Nathan Green.

At the University of Leipzig in 1862–64, German astronomer Johann K. F. Zöllner developed a custom photometer to measure the reflectivity of the Moon, planets and bright stars. For Mars, he derived an albedo of 0.27. Between 1877 and 1893, German astronomers Gustav Müller and Paul Kempf observed Mars using Zöllner's photometer. They found a small phase coefficient—the variation in reflectivity with angle—indicating that the surface of Mars is smooth and without large irregularities. In 1867, French astronomer Pierre Janssen and British astronomer William Huggins used spectroscopes to examine the atmosphere of Mars. Both compared the optical spectrum of Mars to that of the Moon. As the spectrum of the latter did not display absorption lines of water, they believed they had detected the presence of water vapor in the atmosphere of Mars. This result was confirmed by German astronomer Herman C. Vogel in 1872 and English astronomer Edward W. Maunder in 1875, but would later come into question. In 1882, an article appeared in Scientific American discussing snow on the polar regions of Mars and speculation on the probability of ocean currents.

A particularly favorable perihelic opposition occurred in 1877. The English astronomer David Gill used this opportunity to measure the diurnal parallax of Mars from Ascension Island, which led to a parallax estimate of 8.78 ± 0.01 arcseconds. Using this result, he was able to more accurately determine the distance of the Earth from the Sun, based upon the relative size of the orbits of Mars and the Earth. He noted that the edge of the disk of Mars appeared fuzzy because of its atmosphere, which limited the precision he could obtain for the planet's position.

In August 1877, the American astronomer Asaph Hall discovered the two moons of Mars using a 660 mm (26 in) telescope at the U.S. Naval Observatory. The names of the two satellites, Phobos and Deimos, were chosen by Hall based upon a suggestion by Henry Madan, a science instructor at Eton College in England.

== Martian canals ==
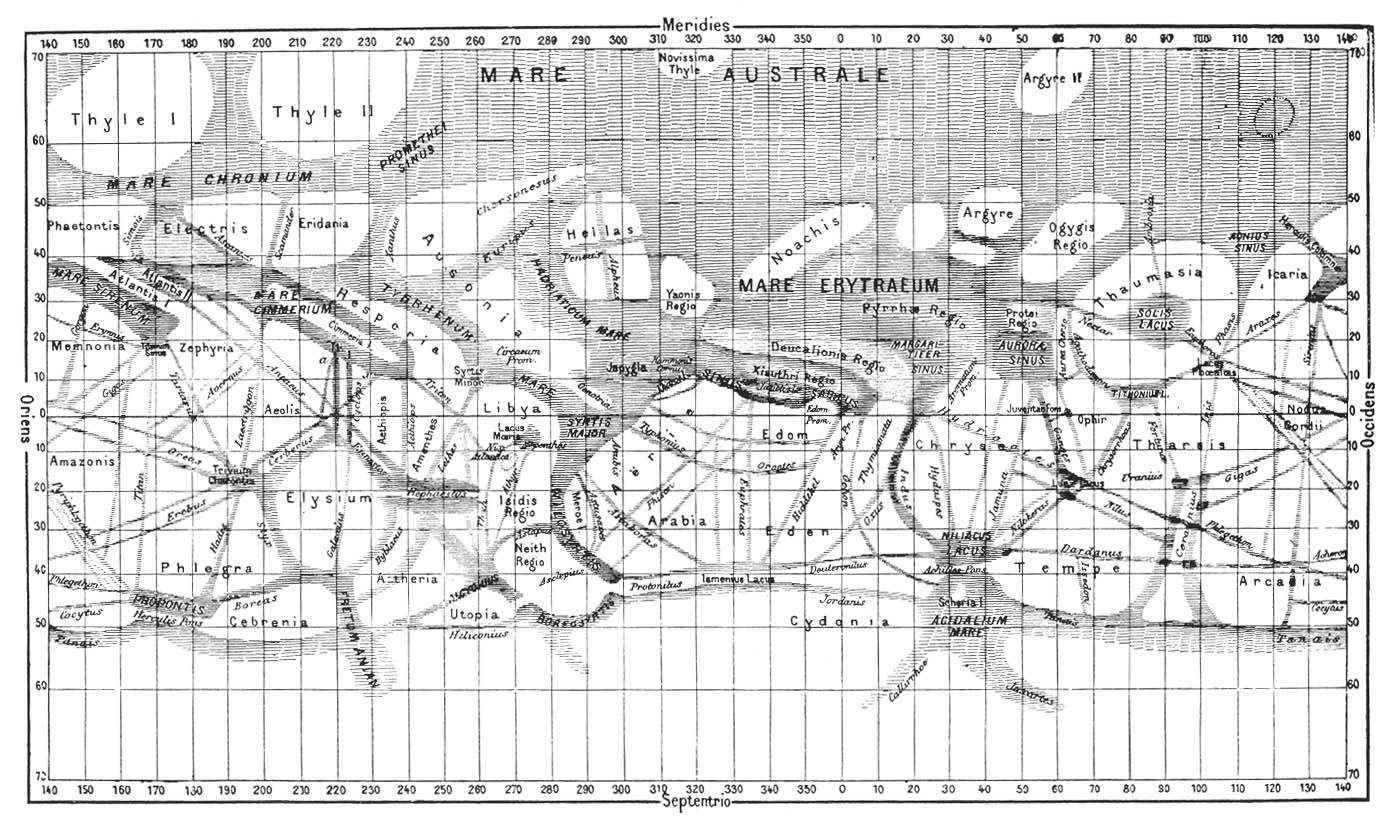
Map of Mars by Giovanni Schiaparelli, compiled between 1877 and 1886, showing canali features as fine lines

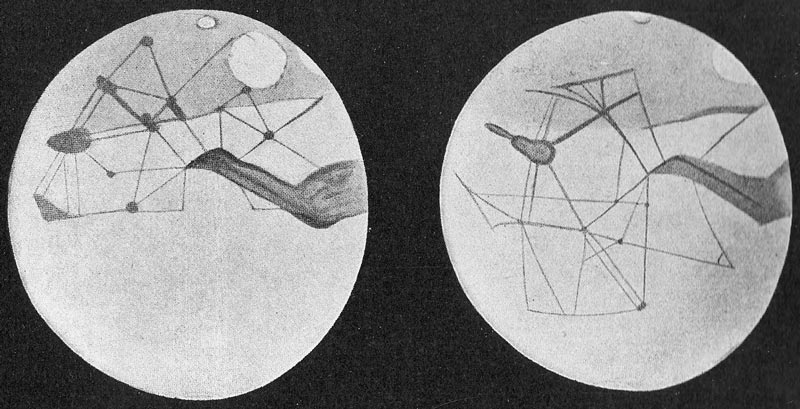
Mars sketched as observed by Lowell sometime before 1914. (South top)

During the 1877 opposition, Italian astronomer Giovanni Schiaparelli used a 22 cm (8.7 in) telescope to help produce the first detailed map of Mars. These maps notably contained features he called canali, which were later shown to be an optical illusion. These canali were supposedly long straight lines on the surface of Mars to which he gave names of famous rivers on Earth. His term canali was popularly mistranslated in English as canals. In 1886, the English astronomer William F. Denning observed that these linear features were irregular in nature and showed concentrations and interruptions. By 1895, English astronomer Edward Maunder became convinced that the linear features were merely the summation of many smaller details.

In his 1892 work La planète Mars et ses conditions d'habitabilité, Camille Flammarion wrote about how these channels resembled man-made canals, which an intelligent race could use to redistribute water across a dying Martian world. He advocated for the existence of such inhabitants, and suggested they may be more advanced than humans.

Influenced by the observations of Schiaparelli, Percival Lowell founded an observatory with 30-and-45 cm (12-and-18 in) telescopes. The observatory was used for the exploration of Mars during the last good opportunity in 1894 and the following less favorable oppositions. He published books on Mars and life on the planet, which had a great influence on the public. The canali were found by other astronomers, such as Henri Joseph Perrotin and Louis Thollon using a 38 cm (15 in) refractor at the Nice Observatory in France, one of the largest telescopes of that time.

Beginning in 1901, American astronomer A. E. Douglass attempted to photograph the canal features of Mars. These efforts appeared to succeed when American astronomer Carl O. Lampland published photographs of the supposed canals in 1905. Although these results were widely accepted, they became contested by Greek astronomer Eugène M. Antoniadi, English naturalist Alfred Russel Wallace and others as merely imagined features. As bigger telescopes were used, fewer long, straight canali were observed. During an observation in 1909 by Flammarion with an 84 cm (33 in) telescope, irregular patterns were observed, but no canali were seen.

Starting in 1909 Eugène Antoniadi was able to help disprove the theory of Martian canali by viewing through the great refractor of Meudon, the Grande Lunette (83 cm lens). A trifecta of observational factors synergize; viewing through the third largest refractor in the World, Mars was at opposition, and exceptional clear weather. The canali dissolved before Antoniadi's eyes into various "spots and blotches" on the surface of Mars.

== Refining planetary parameters ==
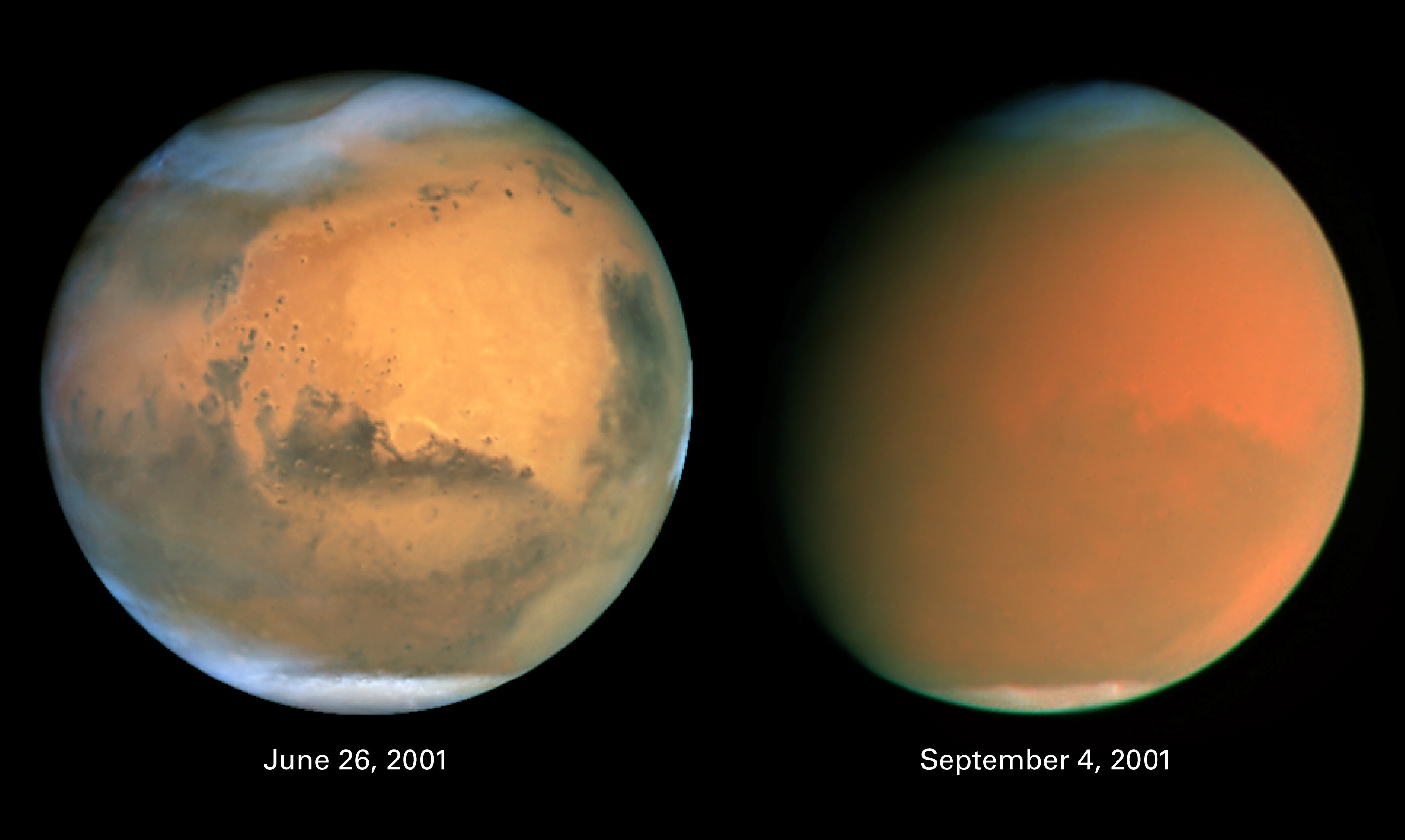
In the left image, thin Martian clouds are visible near the polar regions. At right, the surface of Mars is obscured by a dust storm. NASA/HST images

Surface obscuration caused by yellow clouds had been noted in the 1870s when they were observed by Schiaparelli. Evidence for such clouds was observed during the oppositions of 1892 and 1907. In 1909, Antoniadi noted that the presence of yellow clouds was associated with the obscuration of albedo features. He discovered that Mars appeared more yellow during oppositions when the planet was closest to the Sun and was receiving more energy. He suggested windblown sand or dust as the cause of the clouds.

In 1894, American astronomer William W. Campbell found that the spectrum of Mars was identical to the spectrum of the Moon, throwing doubt on the burgeoning theory that the atmosphere of Mars is similar to that of the Earth. Previous detections of water in the atmosphere of Mars were explained by unfavorable conditions, and Campbell determined that the water signature came entirely from the Earth's atmosphere. Although he agreed that the ice caps did indicate there was water in the atmosphere, he did not believe the caps were sufficiently large to allow the water vapor to be detected. At the time, Campbell's results were considered controversial and were criticized by members of the astronomical community, but they were confirmed by American astronomer Walter S. Adams in 1925.

Baltic German astronomer Hermann Struve used the observed changes in the orbits of the Martian moons to determine the gravitational influence of the planet's oblate shape. In 1895, he used this data to estimate that the equatorial diameter was 1/190 larger than the polar diameter. In 1911, he refined the value to 1/192. This result was confirmed by American meteorologist Edgar W. Woolard in 1944.

Using a vacuum thermocouple attached to the 2.54 m (100 in) Hooker Telescope at Mount Wilson Observatory, in 1924 the American astronomers Seth Barnes Nicholson and Edison Pettit were able to measure the thermal energy being radiated by the surface of Mars. They determined that the temperature ranged from −68 °C (−90 °F) at the pole up to 7 °C (45 °F) at the midpoint of the disk (corresponding to the equator). Beginning in the same year, radiated energy measurements of Mars were made by American physicist William Coblentz and American astronomer Carl Otto Lampland. The results showed that the night time temperature on Mars dropped to −85 °C (−121 °F), indicating an "enormous diurnal fluctuation" in temperatures. The temperature of Martian clouds was measured as −30 °C (−22 °F). In 1926, by measuring spectral lines that were redshifted by the orbital motions of Mars and Earth, American astronomer Walter Sydney Adams was able to directly measure the amount of oxygen and water vapor in the atmosphere of Mars. He determined that "extreme desert conditions" were prevalent on Mars. In 1934, Adams and American astronomer Theodore Dunham Jr. found that the amount of oxygen in the atmosphere of Mars was less than one percent of the amount over a comparable area on Earth.

In 1927, Dutch graduate student Cyprianus Annius van den Bosch made a determination of the mass of Mars based upon the motions of the Martian moons, with an accuracy of 0.2%. This result was confirmed by the Dutch astronomer Willem de Sitter and published posthumously in 1938. Using observations of the near Earth asteroid Eros from 1926 to 1945, German-American astronomer Eugene K. Rabe was able to make an independent estimate the mass of Mars, as well as the other planets in the inner Solar System, from the planet's gravitational perturbations of the asteroid. His estimated margin of error was 0.05%, but subsequent checks suggested his result was poorly determined compared to other methods.

During the 1920s, French astronomer Bernard Lyot used a polarimeter to study the surface properties of the Moon and planets. In 1929, he noted that the polarized light emitted from the Martian surface is very similar to that radiated from the Moon, although he speculated that his observations could be explained by frost and possibly vegetation. Based on the amount of sunlight scattered by the Martian atmosphere, he set an upper limit of 1/15 the thickness of the Earth's atmosphere. This restricted the surface pressure to no greater than 2.4 kPa (24 mbar). Using infrared spectrometry, in 1947 the Dutch-American astronomer Gerard Kuiper detected carbon dioxide in the Martian atmosphere. He was able to estimate that the amount of carbon dioxide over a given area of the surface is double that on the Earth. However, because he overestimated the surface pressure on Mars, Kuiper concluded erroneously that the ice caps could not be composed of frozen carbon dioxide. In 1948, American meteorologist Seymour L. Hess determined that the formation of the thin Martian clouds would only require 4 mm (0.16 in) of water precipitation and a vapor pressure of 0.1 kPa (1.0 mbar).

The first standard nomenclature for Martian albedo features was introduced by the International Astronomical Union (IAU) when in 1960 they adopted 128 names from the 1929 map of Antoniadi named La Planète Mars. The Working Group for Planetary System Nomenclature (WGPSN) was established by the IAU in 1973 to standardize the naming scheme for Mars and other bodies.

== Remote sensing ==
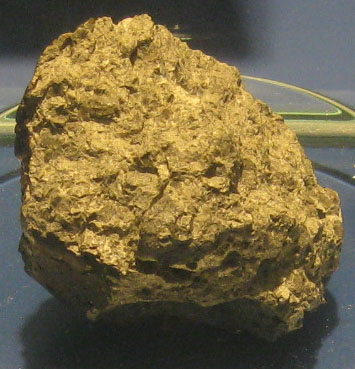
Photograph of the Martian meteorite ALH84001

The International Planetary Patrol Program was formed in 1969 as a consortium to continually monitor planetary changes. This worldwide group focused on observing dust storms on Mars. Their images allow Martian seasonal patterns to be studied globally, and they showed that most Martian dust storms occur when the planet is closest to the Sun.

Since the 1960s, robotic spacecraft have been sent to explore Mars from orbit and the surface in extensive detail. In addition, remote sensing of Mars from Earth by ground-based and orbiting telescopes has continued across much of the electromagnetic spectrum. These include infrared observations to determine the composition of the surface, ultraviolet and submillimeter observation of the atmospheric composition, and radio measurements of wind velocities.

The Hubble Space Telescope (HST) has been used to perform systematic studies of Mars and has taken the highest resolution images of Mars ever captured from Earth. This telescope can produce useful images of the planet when it is at an angular distance of at least 50° from the Sun. The HST can take images of a hemisphere, which yields views of entire weather systems. Earth-based telescopes equipped with charge-coupled devices can produce useful images of Mars, allowing for regular monitoring of the planet's weather during oppositions.

X-ray emission from Mars was first observed by astronomers in 2001 using the Chandra X-ray Observatory, and in 2003 it was shown to have two components. The first component is caused by X-rays from the Sun scattering off the upper Martian atmosphere; the second comes from interactions between ions that result in an exchange of charges. The emission from the latter source has been observed out to eight times the radius of Mars by the XMM-Newton orbiting observatory.

In 1983, the analysis of the shergottite, nakhlite, and chassignite (SNC) group of meteorites showed that they may have originated on Mars. The Allan Hills 84001 meteorite, discovered in Antarctica in 1984, is believed to have originated on Mars but it has an entirely different composition than the SNC group. In 1996, it was announced that this meteorite might contain evidence for microscopic fossils of Martian bacteria. However, this finding remains controversial. Chemical analysis of the Martian meteorites found on Earth suggests that the ambient near-surface temperature of Mars has most likely been below the freezing point of water (0 °C) for much of the last four billion years.

== Observations ==
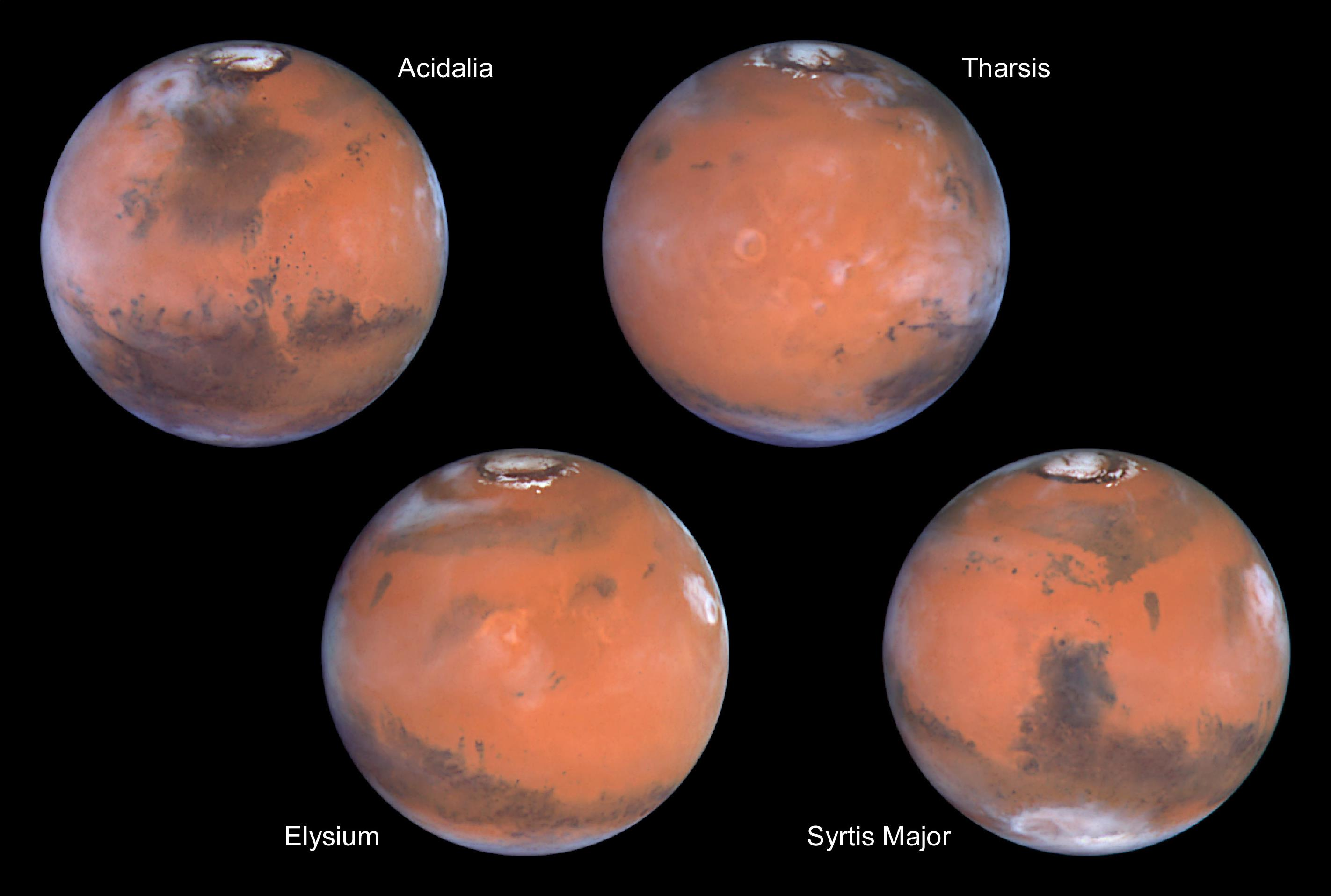
Mars during the 1999 opposition as seen by space telescope

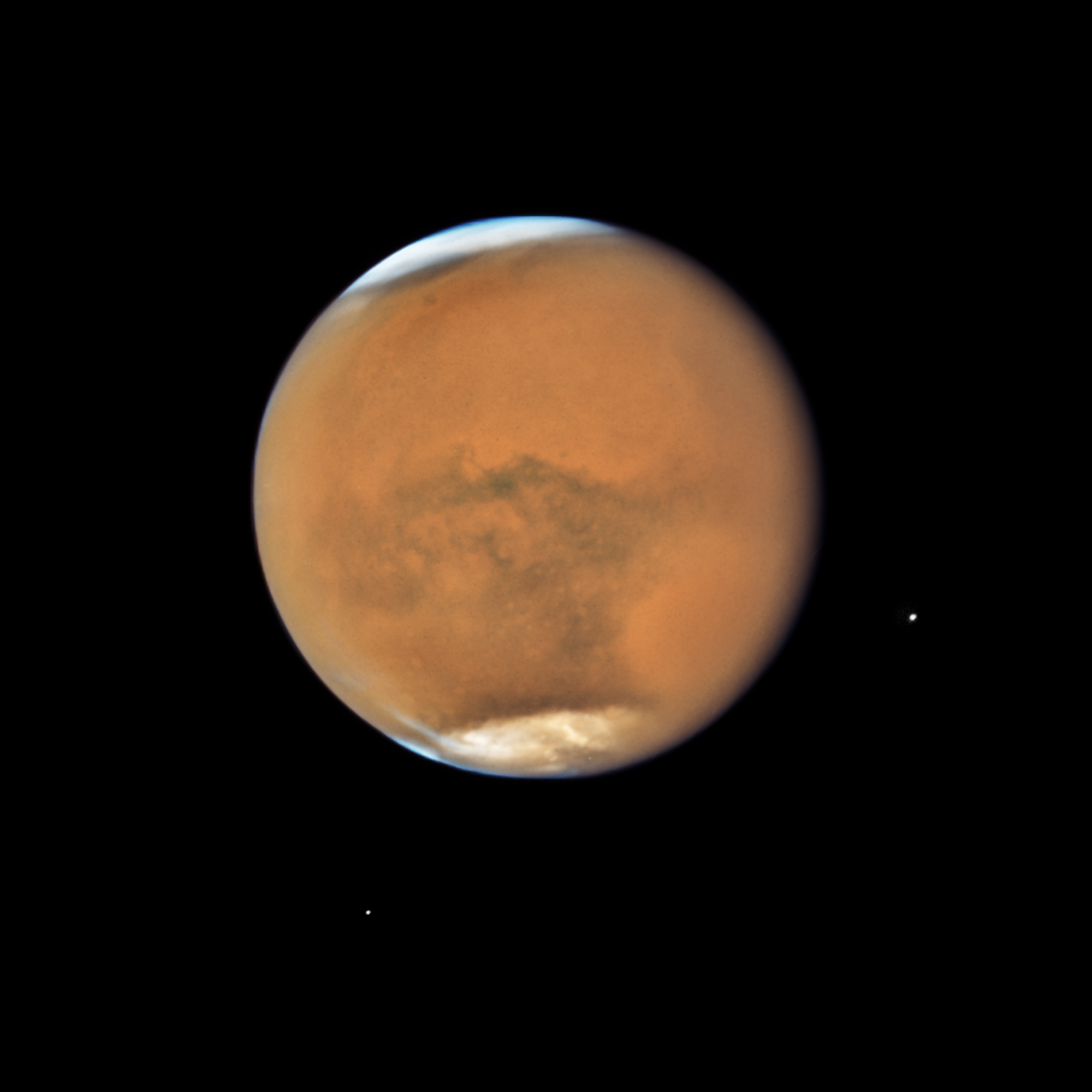
Mars at its 2018 opposition, with its atmosphere clouded by a global dust storm that snuffed out the solar-powered Opportunity rover

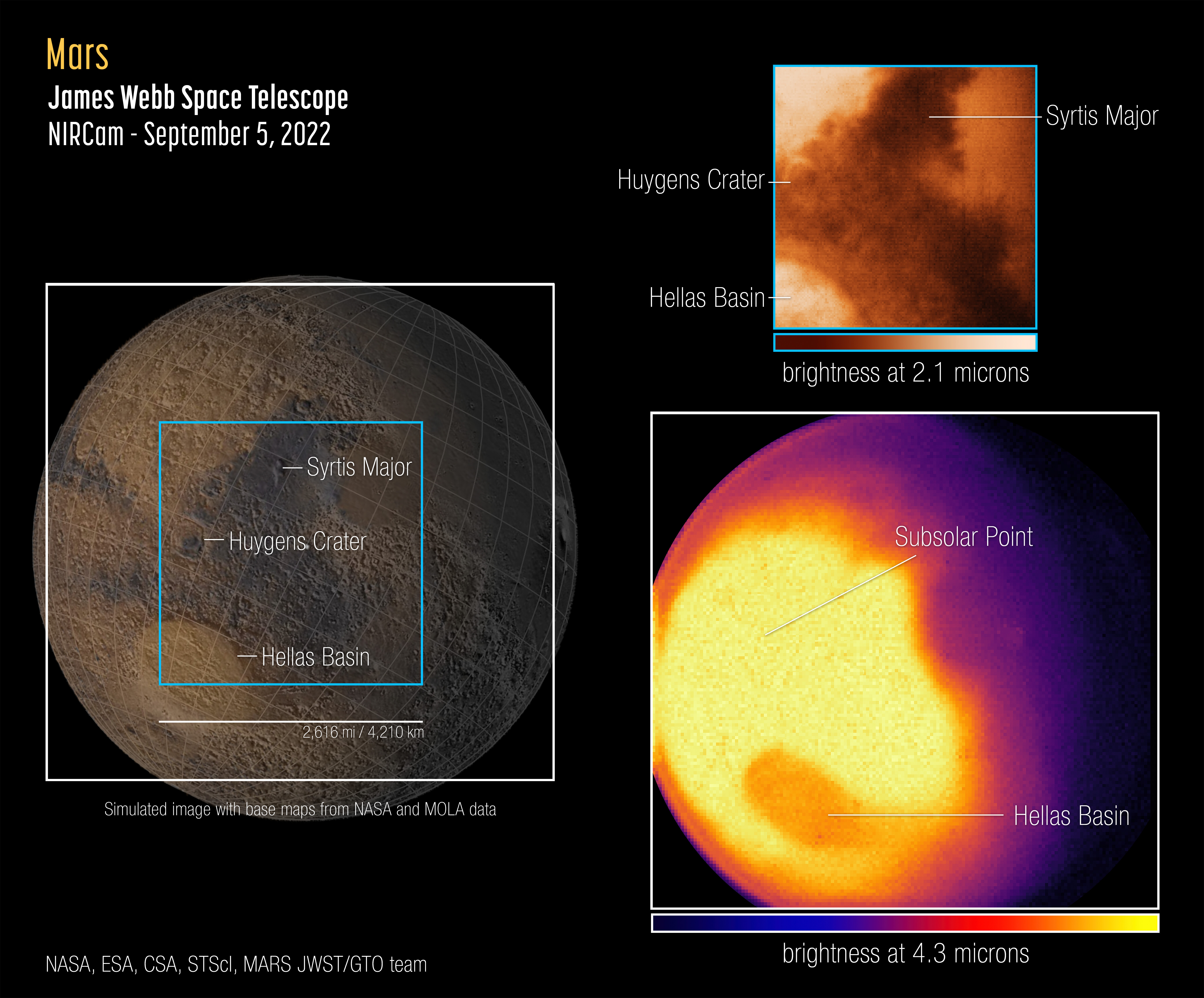
The James Webb Space Telescope captured its first images and spectra of Mars on 5 September 2022.

== See also ==
- Exploration of Mars
- Mars in history
- Mars lander
