= 18 Aquilae =

Triple star system in the constellation Aquila

- Location of 18 Aquilae (circled)

Observation data Epoch J2000 Equinox ICRS
- Constellation: Aquila
- Right ascension: 19^{h} 06^{m} 58.60289^{s}
- Declination: +11° 04′ 16.4173″
- Apparent magnitude (V): 5.072

Characteristics
- Spectral type: B8 III
- U−B color index: −0.44
- B−V color index: −0.08
- Variable type: Eclipsing

Astrometry
Radial velocity (R_{v})	−18.6 km/s
Proper motion (μ)	RA: −0.89 mas/yr Dec.: −32.11 mas/yr
Parallax (π)	6.43±0.79 mas
Distance	approx. 510 ly (approx. 160 pc)

Orbit
Primary	A
Name	B
Period (P)	205.16 yr
Semi-major axis (a)	0.399″
Eccentricity (e)	0.23
Inclination (i)	134.3°

Orbit
Primary	Aa
Name	Ab
Period (P)	1.3023 d
Semi-amplitude (K_{1}) (primary)	27.6 km/s

Details

Aa
Mass	5.6 M_{☉}
Luminosity	4,875 L_{☉}
Rotational velocity (v sin i)	50 km/s

Ab
Mass	0.38 M_{☉}
Luminosity	12.7 L_{☉}

B
Mass	3.49 M_{☉}

Other designations
- Y Aquilae, 18 Aql, BD+10 3787, FK5 3525, HD 178125, HIP 93867, HR 7248, SAO 104488

Database references
SIMBAD	data

18 Aquilae (abbreviated 18 Aql) is a triple star system in the constellation of Aquila. 18 Aquilae is the Flamsteed designation; it also bears the variable star designation Y Aquilae. It has an apparent visual magnitude of 5.07, making it bright enough to be seen with the naked eye. The distance to this system can be estimated from the annual parallax shift of 6.43 mas, yielding a value of around 510 light-years (160 parsecs) away from Earth.

It took decades to determine whether or not 18 Aquilae is a variable star. It was used as a standard star in Benjamin Apthorp Gould's Uranometria Argentina, published in 1879. Gould marked the star with an asterisk, indicating that he thought it is a variable star. Gustav Müller and Paul Kempf noted Gould's opinion in their 1894 work Potsdamer Photometrische Durchmusterung, but stated that their numerous observations did not confirm that the star is variable. That same year, Seth Carlo Chandler reported that 18 Aquilae is a variable star. He stated the star showed an "unmistakable periodicity" and derived a period of 4.986 days - nearly 4 times larger than what the period is now known to be. Chandler gave the star the name Y Aquilae. In 1898, Edward Charles Pickering and Paul S. Yendell announced that their observations of the star "fail to show any evidence of variation". In 1966, Robert Arnold Breinhorst established that Y Aquilae is variable in his PhD thesis.

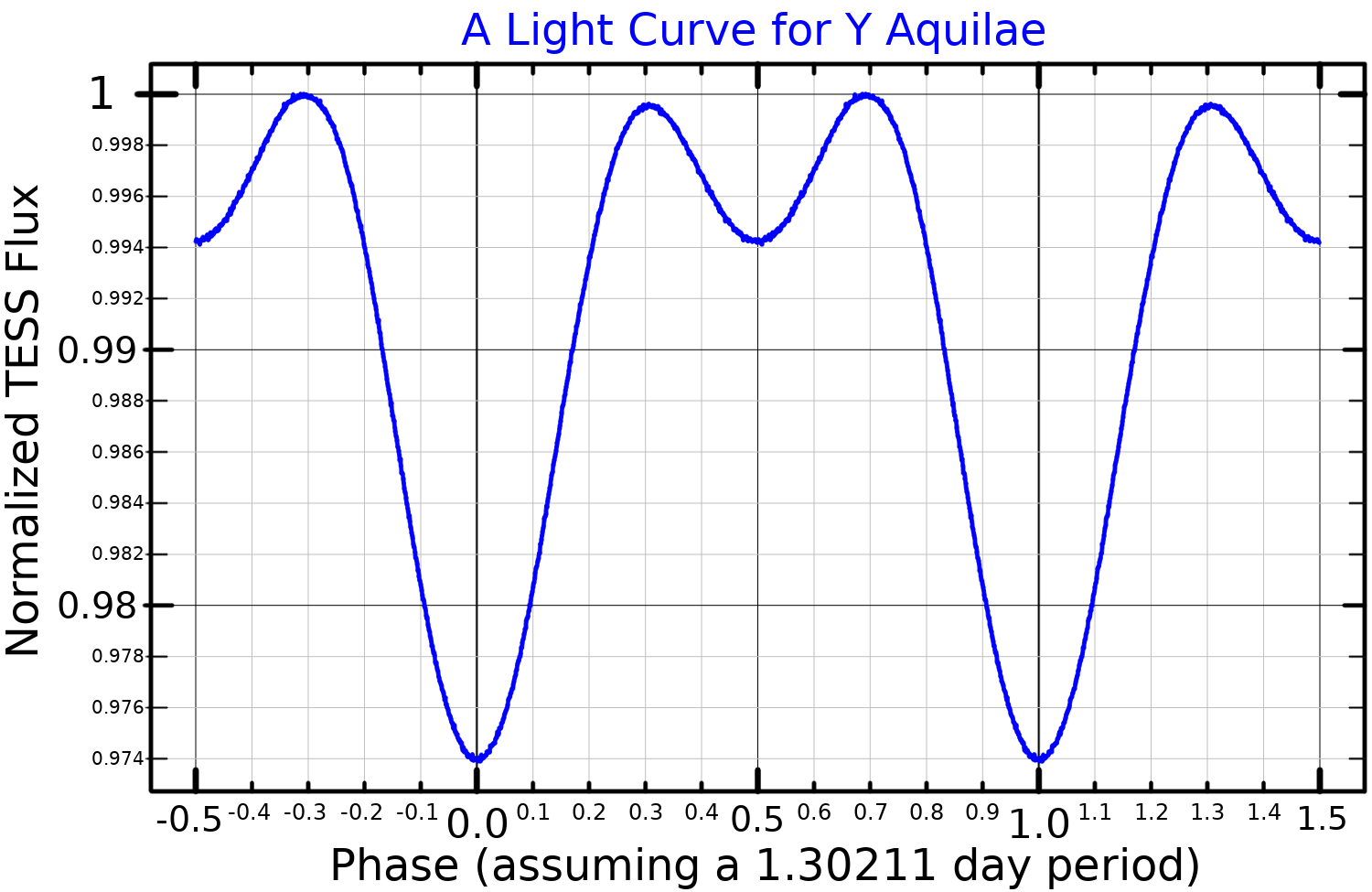
A light curve for Y Aquilae, plotted from TESS data

The inner pair of stars in this system form a spectroscopic binary with a combined magnitude of 5.44 and an orbital period of 1.302 days. The primary component is a giant star with a stellar classification of B8 III. Because the orbital plane is inclined near the line of sight, two form an eclipsing binary system. The eclipse of the primary component causes a 0.04 drop in magnitude, while the eclipse of the secondary results in a decrease of 0.03. At an angular separation of 0.310 arcseconds is the magnitude 6.39 tertiary component. This system has a high peculiar velocity of 29.7 ± 3.9 km/s relative to the neighboring stars.
