= Joseph Bruno (disambiguation) =

Joseph Bruno (1929–2020) was an American businessman and Republican politician in New York.

Joseph Bruno may also refer to:

- Joseph James Bruno (c. 1878–1951), mastermind of the Kelayres massacre, prison escapee
- Joseph F. Bruno (born c. 1944), public official in New York City
- Joseph Jon Bruno (1946–2021), Episcopal bishop of Los Angeles
- Joseph W. Bruno (born 1955), American academic and president of Marietta College
- Joseph Bruno (Maine politician) (born 1955), American politician from Maine
- Joe Bruno (rugby league) (born 1985), Papua New Guinea rugby league international
