= Edgar Woolard =

Edgar Woolard may refer to:

- Edgar S. Woolard Jr. (born 1934), American businessman
- Edgar W. Woolard (1899–1978), American meteorologist, mathematician and planetary scientist
