= History of Mars =

History of Mars may refer to:

- History of Mars observation
- Geological history of Mars
