= 18th century (disambiguation) =

The 18th century is a century of the Common Era which began on 1 January 1701 and ended on 31 December 1800, according to the Gregorian calendar.

18th century may also refer to:

- 18th century BC
- The Eighteenth Century: Theory and Interpretation, an academic journal
