= Robert Wilson (editor) =

American magazine editor and author (born 1951)

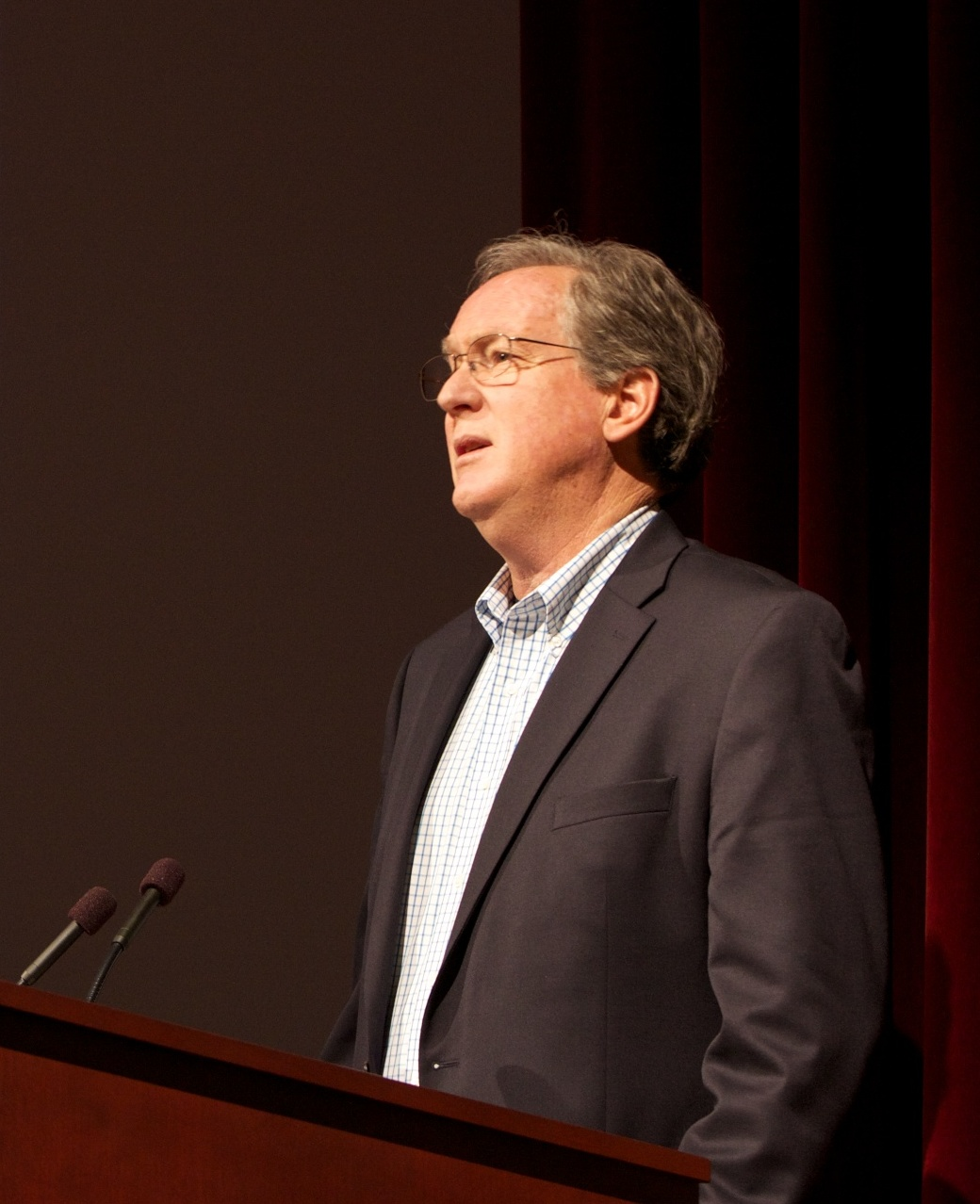
Robert Wilson in 2013

Robert S. Wilson (born 1951) is an American writer and retired magazine editor. From 2004 to 2022 he edited The American Scholar, the literary journal published by Phi Beta Kappa society. Before that he was editor of the AARP Bulletin and Preservation magazine and literary editor of Civilization magazine. Wilson has also written three biographies set in nineteenth-century America and edited a collection of essays from Preservation.

== Biography ==
Wilson graduated from Washington and Lee University and received a master's degree from the University of Virginia. He worked at The Washington Post and at USA Today, where he was a book columnist as well as the book-review editor. He was the founding literary editor at Civilization, a magazine published under the auspices of the Library of Congress. Civilization won a National Magazine Award for General Excellence in 1996. That year, Wilson became the editor of Preservation, the magazine of the National Trust for Historic Preservation. Under him, Preservation won a National Magazine Award for General Excellence in 1998.

In 2004 Wilson briefly served as editor of the AARP Bulletin, then became the seventh editor of The American Scholar, six months after that journal had dismissed its prior editor, Anne Fadiman, in a widely publicized dispute over funding. Wilson took steps to increase the journal's focus on current events. The American Scholar's writers have won a number of awards during Wilson's tenure, and the magazine has been a finalist for a National Magazine Award for General Excellence in 2009, 2012, 2014, and 2015.

Wilson lives in Manassas, Virginia, and is a member of Phi Beta Kappa.

== Books ==
Wilson edited the 2002 book A Certain Somewhere: Writers on the Places They Remember, a collection of essays from Preservation magazine. He is the author of the 2006 book The Explorer King: Adventure, Science, and the Great Diamond Hoax; Clarence King in the Old West, about the flamboyant nineteenth-century geologist Clarence King, who was the first director of the United States Geological Survey. A Los Angeles Times reviewer, Carmela Ciuraru, wrote that “Wilson makes King, flaws and all, into an irresistible protagonist.” Entertainment Weekly reviewer Paul Katz gave the book a "B+" rating and called it "an engrossing portrait". Some other reviewers were more critical, noting that the book devoted little space to the later, problematic parts of King's life.

Wilson's 2013 book, Mathew Brady: Portraits of a Nation, is a biography of the pioneer photographer Mathew Brady. New York Times columnist Dwight Garner called it “sober history, a flinty chunk of Americana.” Max Byrd in The Wilson Quarterly, wrote, “Wilson’s book is notable for its thorough, up-to-date narrative. And his responses to Brady’s work are criticism of a high order.” Reviewers noted the difficulties of writing a biography of Brady, about whom many details are unknown. Washington Post reviewer Michael Ruane thought the book's best aspect was "its fascinating account of how the business of photography worked in the mid-19th century", and The Economist similarly commented that the book was "more a portrait of an age than of a man".

His 2019 book, Barnum: An American Life, was widely reviewed, including pieces in The Atlantic, The New Yorker, The New York Review of Books, The New York Times, and The Washington Post. Rachel Shteir wrote in The Wall Street Journal that the book “eschews cliches for a more nuanced story” and “is a life for our times, and the biography Barnum deserves.” Historian John F. Kasson wrote in The Journal of American History that Wilson’s “new, relatively short biography is amiable, witty, judicious, and satisfying,” but warned that “it does not greatly alter our understanding of Barnum.”
