= Marjorie Hope Nicolson =

American literary scholar

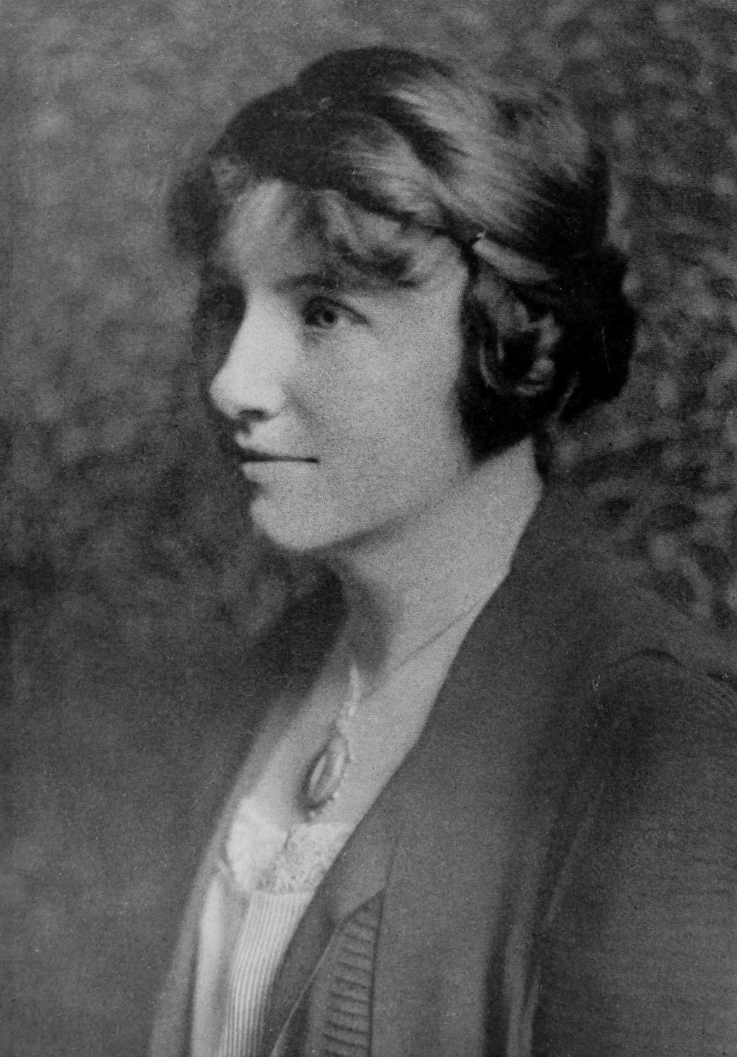
- In the Smith Alumnae Quarterly, 1929
- Born: February 18, 1894; Yonkers, New York, US
- Died: March 9, 1981 (aged 87); White Plains, New York, US
- Awards: Fellow of the American Academy of Arts and Sciences; John Addison Porter Prize; Guggenheim Fellowship

Academic background
- Education: University of Michigan Yale University

Academic work
- Discipline: literature
- Institutions: Smith College; Columbia University

Marjorie Hope Nicolson (February 18, 1894 – March 9, 1981) was an American literary scholar. She was elected a member of the American Philosophical Society in 1941 and a Fellow of the American Academy of Arts and Sciences in 1955.

== Early life and education ==
Marjorie Hope Nicolson was born in Yonkers, New York on February 18, 1894. She was the daughter of Charles Butler Nicolson, editor-in-chief of the Detroit Free Press during World War I and later that paper's correspondent in Washington, DC, and Lissie Hope Morris.

Nicolson graduated from the University of Michigan with a B.A. degree in 1914, followed by her M.A. in 1918. Afterwards, she attended Yale, where she received a Ph.D. in 1920, where she was the first woman to receive the distinguished John Addison Porter Prize for her dissertation.

She taught first at the University of Michigan and was granted an assistant professorship before continuing her graduate study at Johns Hopkins College from 1923–1926. While at Johns Hopkins, Nicolson continued to teach at Goucher College. In 1926, she left for England to study as one of the early Guggenheim fellows.

== Career ==
After her studies in Europe, Nicolson returned to the United States to continue her research and to teach at Smith College. She was first an associate professor from 1926–1929, before becoming a professor of English literature and Dean from 1929 until 1941. During her time at Smith College, Nicolson was a strong ally of President Neilson and defender of women's right to have a real academic education.

She left Smith College for Columbia, in order to become the first woman to hold a full professorship at a prestigious graduate school. She became the chair of the English and Comparative literature department. Nicolson, or Miss Nicky, as she was intimately known by a few special students, became a much admired professor and scholar, who inspired many doctoral candidates while at Columbia. She was awarded the Columbia Bicentennial Silver Medallion in 1954. She left Columbia in 1962 as the Peter Field Trent Professor Emeritus, but still did not retire from the academic arena.

In 1963, she spent one year as the Francis Bacon chair at Claremont Graduate school. Following this year, she traveled to Princeton where she became the visiting scholar at the National Institute for Advanced Study. Throughout her busy career in academia, Nicolson found time to publish many short essays and books. She wrote throughout her life, and was awarded the British Academy Crawshay prize in 1947, for one of her early works, Newton Demands the Muse.

In 1940, she became the first woman president of Phi Beta Kappa; in 1943 she took over for a year as the interim editor of that organization's literary journal, The American Scholar, after its first editor, William Allison Shimer, resigned. She was also president of the Modern Language Association in 1963.

An authority on 17th-century literature and thought, she was the author of numerous books. She was awarded the Pilgrim Award from the Science Fiction Research Association in 1971 for her pioneering work in the relationship between science and literature.

Nicolson was awarded honorary degrees from over 17 colleges. She was the first woman to receive the Wilbur Cross Medal, an award for distinguished alumni of the Yale Graduate School of Arts and Sciences.

== Death ==
She died on March 9, 1981, in White Plains, New York.

== Books ==
- The Art of Description (F. S. Crofts, 1925)
- A World in the Moon (Smith College, 1935)
- Newton Demands the Muse: Newton's Opticks and the Eighteenth Century Poets (Princeton University Press, 1946)
- Voyages to the Moon (Macmillan, 1948)
- The Breaking of the Circle: Studies in the Effect of the New Science on Seventeenth-Century Poetry (Northwestern University Press, 1950)
- Science and Imagination (Columbia University Press, 1956)
- Mountain Gloom and Mountain Glory: The Development of the Aesthetics of the Infinite (Cornell University Press, 1959)
- John Milton: A Reader's Guide to His Poetry (Farrar, Straus, 1963)
- Pepys' Diary and the New Science (University Press of Virginia, 1965)
- Books Are Not Dead Things (College of William and Mary, 1966)
- With G. S. Rousseau, "This Long Disease, My Life": Alexander Pope and the Sciences (Princeton University Press, 1968)

=== As editor ===
- The Conway Letters: The Correspondence of Anne, Viscountess Conway, Henry More and Their Friends, 1642–1684 (Yale University Press, 1930)
- With David Stuart Rodes, The Virtuoso by Thomas Shadwell (University of Nebraska Press, 1966)
