= The American Scholar (magazine) =

Quarterly literary magazine

- Editor: Sudip Bose
- Categories: Literary
- Frequency: Quarterly
- Publisher: Frederick M. Lawrence
- Founded: 1932
- Company: Phi Beta Kappa Society
- Country: United States
- Based in: Washington, D.C.
- Language: English
- Website: www.theamericanscholar.org
- ISSN: 0003-0937

The American Scholar is the quarterly literary magazine of Phi Beta Kappa society, established in 1932. The magazine has won fourteen National Magazine Awards from the American Society of Magazine Editors from 1999 to present, including awards for General Excellence (circulation <100,000). Additionally, the magazine has won four Utne Independent Press Awards from Utne Reader, most recently in 2011 in the category "Best Writing".

The magazine is named for an oration by Ralph Waldo Emerson given before the society in 1837. According to its website, "the magazine aspires to Emerson’s ideals of independent thinking, self-knowledge, and a commitment to the affairs of the world as well as to books, history, and science." The American Scholar began publishing fiction in 2006, and "essays, articles, criticism, and poetry have been mainstays of the magazine for 75 years."

== Editors ==
Since its inception in 1932, the magazine has had eight editors-in-chief (two of them on an interim basis):

- William Allison Shimer (1932–43)
- Marjorie Hope Nicolson (1943–44)*
- Hiram Haydn (1944–73)
- Peter Gay (1974)*
- Joseph Epstein (1974–98)
- Anne Fadiman (1998–2004)
- Robert Wilson (2004–2022)
- Sudip Bose (2022–present)

*Interim editor

== See also ==
- List of literary magazines
