= Marietta College =

Private liberal arts college in Marietta, Ohio, US

Coordinates: 39°25′N 81°27′W

- Former names: Muskingum Academy (predecessor) (1797–1833); Marietta Collegiate Institute and Western Teachers' Seminary (predecessor) (1833–1835)
- Motto: Lux et veritas
- Motto in English: Light and truth
- Type: Private liberal arts college
- Established: January 16, 1835; 191 years ago
- Academic affiliations: CIC, Space-grant
- Endowment: $102.6 million (2021)
- President: Kathleen Poorman Dougherty
- Provost: Suzanne Walker
- Students: 1,109 (2024-2025)
- Undergraduates: 1,023 (2024-2025)
- Postgraduates: 86 (2024-2025)
- Location: Marietta, Ohio, U.S.
- Campus: Small town
- Colors: Navy blue, white
- Nickname: Pioneers
- Sporting affiliations: NCAA Division III – OAC
- Website: marietta.edu

Marietta College is a private liberal arts college in Marietta, Ohio, United States. Its campus encompasses approximately six city blocks next to downtown Marietta and enrolls 1,109 students.

== History ==
Marietta College began as the Muskingum Academy in 1797, which was the birth of higher education in Ohio. In April 1797, which was only nine years after Ohio had been settled, a committee of Marietta citizens, led by General Rufus Putnam (the "Father of Ohio"), met to establish a college. The Muskingum Academy, completed late that year, became the first institution of its kind in the Northwest Territory, providing "classical instruction ... in the higher branches of an English education." Its first instructor was David Putnam, a 1793 Yale graduate.

The academy eventually evolved into a college, initially chartered as the Marietta Collegiate Institute and Western Teachers' Seminary on January 16, 1833. However, this institution lacked the critical authority to grant degrees, so a wholly new charter was approved two years later, bringing the renamed Marietta College into existence on January 16, 1835. The former Muskingum Academy was continued as the Marietta College College Preparatory Department until its elimination in 1913.

=== College presidents ===
Presidents of Marietta College
Tenure	Name
1835-1846	Joel H. Linsley
1846-1855	Henry Smith
1855-1885	Israel Ward Andrews
1885-1891	John Eaton
1892-1896	John Wilson Simpson
1900-1912	Alfred Tyler Perry
1913-1918	George Wheeler Hinman
1919-1936	Edward Smith Parsons
1937-1942	Harry Kelso Eversull
1942-1945	Draper Talman Schoonover
1945-1947	William Allison Shimer
1948-1963	William Bay Irvine
1963-1973	Frank Edward Duddy
1973-1989	Sherrill Cleland
1989-1995	Patrick McDonough
1995-2000	Larry Wilson
2000-2012	Jean Scott
2012-2016	Joseph W. Bruno
2016-2023	William Ruud
2023-2024	Margaret Drugovich (interim)
2025-	Kathleen Poorman Dougherty

== Academics ==
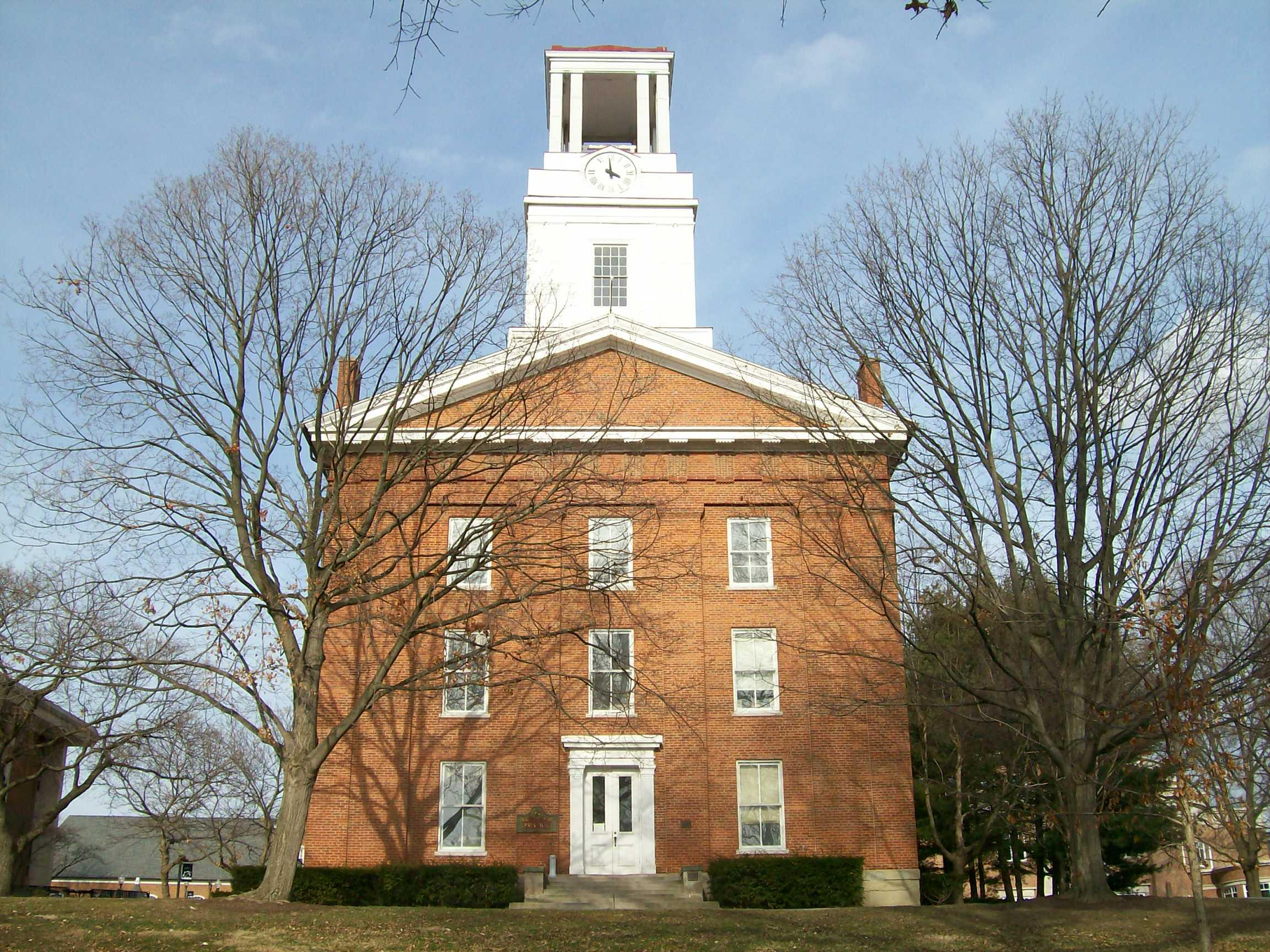
Erwin Hall

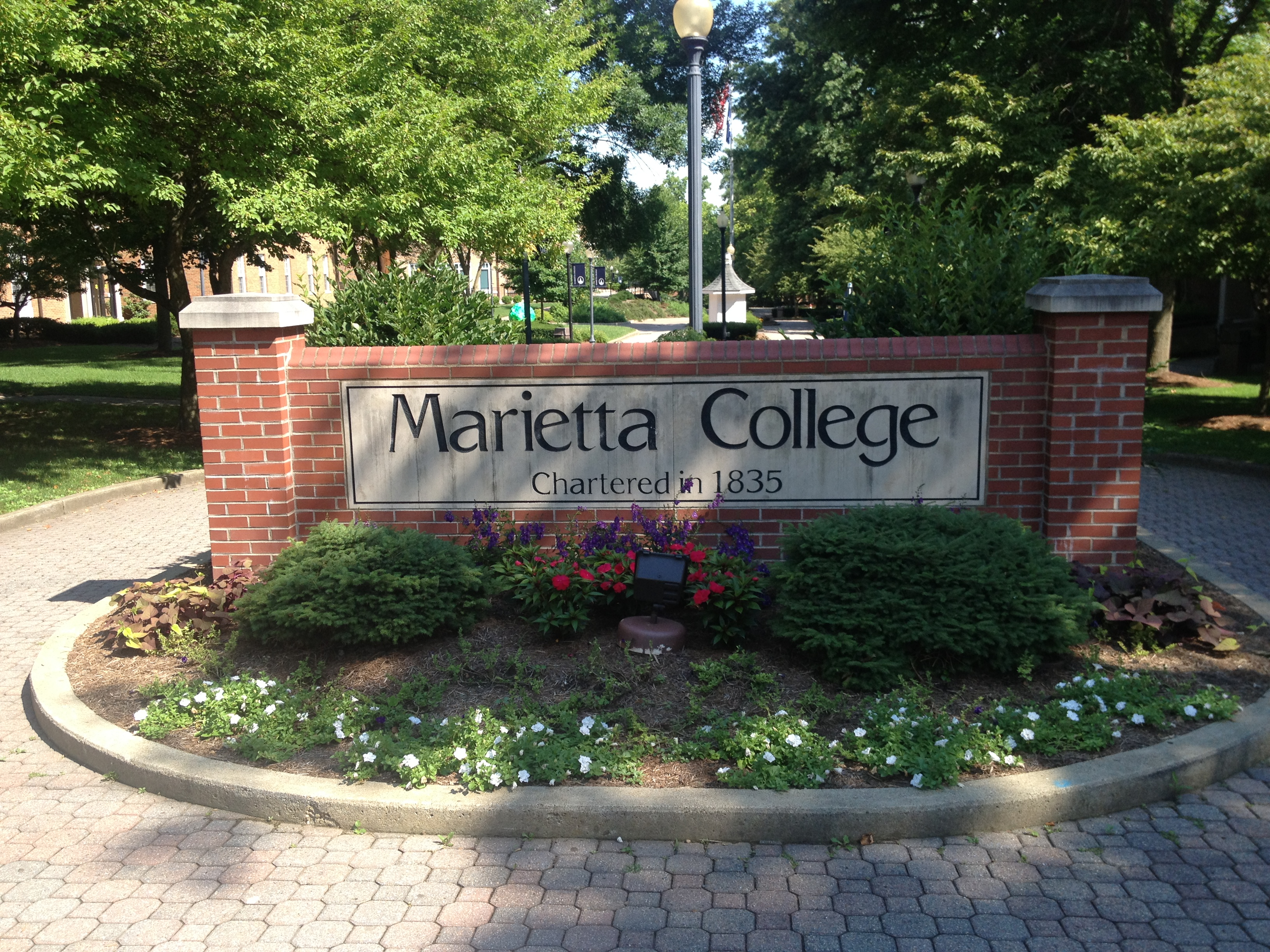
Entrance sign

Marietta College is a Phi Beta Kappa liberal arts institution, requiring students to complete courses in Quantitative Reasoning, Artistic Expression, Civilization & Culture, Social Analysis, and Scientific Inquiry regardless of their major track. Additionally, students are required to have a secondary academic concentration, and complete an out-of-classroom education experience.

There are three honors tracks: curriculum honors, research honors, and college honors. The curriculum honors track provides a course of study for accomplished students. The research honors designation varies across disciplines but typically involves the writing and defense of a thesis. When a student completes the honors curriculum and successfully defends an honors thesis, they achieve college honors status.

The McDonough Center for Leadership and Business at Marietta College started in 1986 with a $5.5 million gift from the Bernard P. McDonough family. With an inaugural cohort of 28 students, the center originally only offered a Certificate in Leadership Studies. The center today offers a bachelor's degree, a minor and a Certificate in Leadership Studies. There is also the Teacher Leadership Certificate (TLC), an academic program designed for students pursuing careers in education.

=== Reputation and rankings ===
In 2025 WSJ/College Pulse rankings, Marietta was ranked #4 in Student Experience, Best Salaries and Social Mobility in Ohio and #5 in Ohio for Best Value. Niche.com ranked Marietta the #1 Best Value College in Ohio.

In 2024, Washington Monthly ranked Marietta 32nd among 223 colleges that award almost exclusively bachelor's degrees in the U.S. based on its contribution to the public good, as measured by social mobility, research, and promoting public service. And in 2021, Marietta was included in national rankings by U.S. News & World Report as #3 for Best Value Schools and #8 for Regional Colleges in the Midwest. College Factual ranked Marietta #20 out of 80 Ohio schools.

== Student life ==
There are several national and international fraternities and sororities on campus. Students attending Marietta College have the opportunity to qualify for any of 23 honor societies.

== Athletics ==
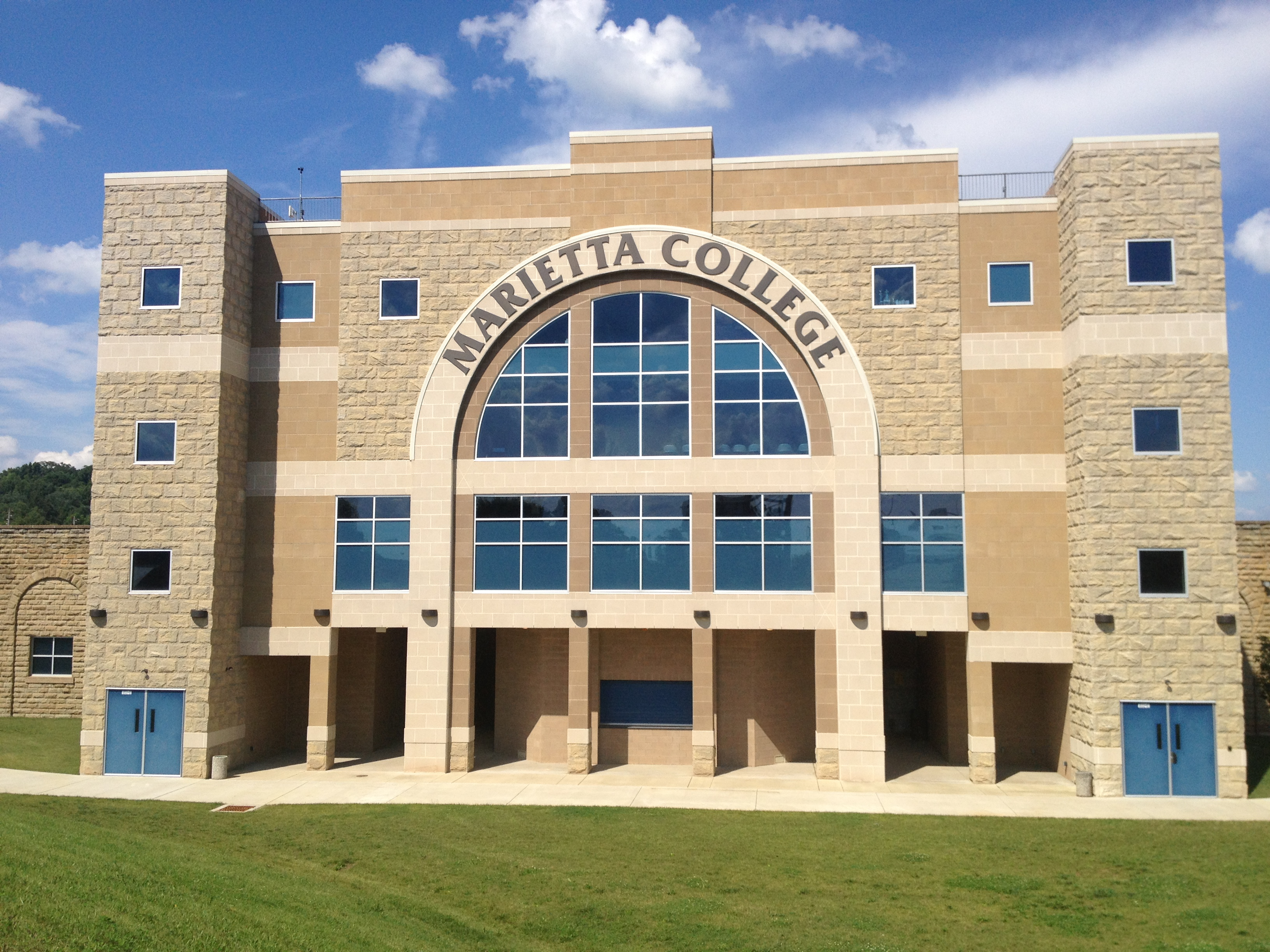
Don Drumm Stadium

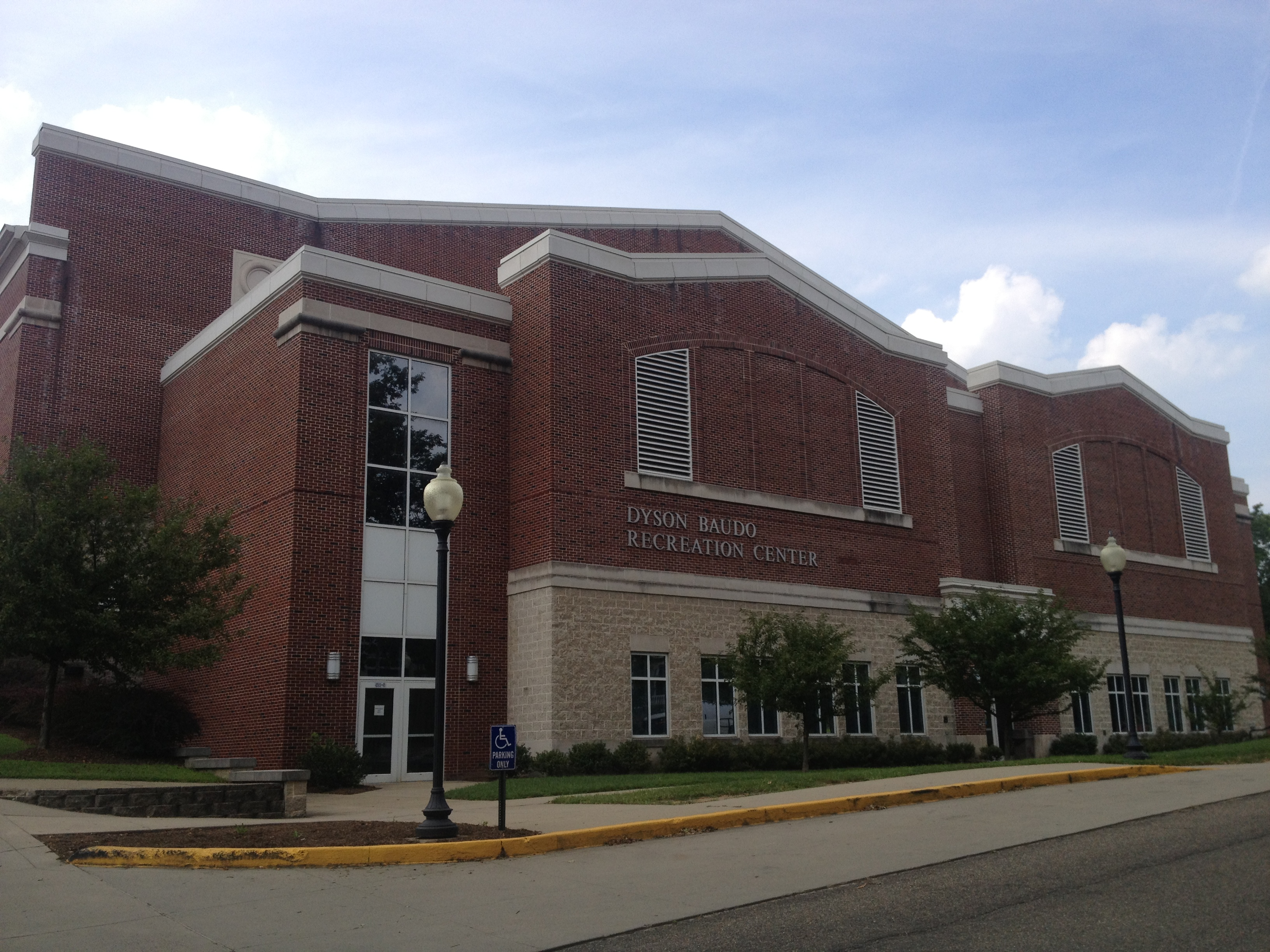
Dyson Baudo Recreation Center

Marietta College is a member of the NCAA Division III and the Ohio Athletic Conference, a 10-team collegiate conference founded in 1902 and the third-oldest in the nation. The Pioneers compete in 21 varsity sports, including teams in crew, baseball, basketball, men's football, women's volleyball, track & field, cross country, soccer, women's softball, golf, and lacrosse. Esports was added in 2021.

Marietta's baseball team has won six national championships, and an NCAA Division III record: in 1981, 1983, 1986, 2006, 2011, and 2012. The first three were under coach Don Schaly, who died on March 9, 2005; the three most recent have been under coach Brian Brewer. By repeating as the national champions in 2011 and 2012 the Pioneers became the first team to do that in NCAA Division III play since the Rowan Profs won back-to-back championships in 1978 and 1979. Six former Pioneer baseball players—Kent Tekulve, Duane Theiss, Jim Tracy, Terry Mulholland, Matt DeSalvo, and Turner Hill—have reached the Major League level.

The crew program competes at the annual Dad Vail Regatta each spring in both men's and women's events, and earned a gold medal in the Men's Varsity Eight in 2006 and 2025, and gold medals in the Women's Varsity Eight in 2011, 2012, and 2014. Alumni include two-time Olympian and CEO of Boathouse Sports, John Strotbeck Jr., and 2003 World Championship silver medalist in the USA Lightweight Eight, Andrew Bolton.

=== Broadcasts ===
Marietta sporting events are broadcast on FloSport event streaming. Events are often broadcast on local commercial radio, with baseball games being carried on WMOA, a commercial station in Marietta.

== Notable alumni ==
Alumni of Marietta College are collectively known as the "Long Blue Line".
