= Preservation (magazine) =

Magazine of the National Trust for Historic Preservation

- Editor: Dennis Hockman
- Categories: Architecture, History, Travel
- Frequency: Quarterly
- Total circulation: 158,783 (December 2013)
- Founded: 1952
- Company: National Trust for Historic Preservation
- Country: United States
- Based in: Washington DC
- Language: English
- Website: PreservationNation.org/magazine
- ISSN: 1090-9931

Preservation, the magazine of the National Trust for Historic Preservation, launched in 1952 as Historic Preservation. In 1998, the magazine won a National Magazine Award for General Excellence under its then-editor, Robert S. Wilson. The magazine's launching point is architecture, but it is also, as the judges of the National Magazine Award write, about "politics, art, history, places, and people … Preservation tells the stories of extraordinary buildings and sites all over the world." The headquarters of the magazine is in Washington DC.
