= Robert Markley =

American academic and author

Robert Markley is an American academic and author who is noted for his contributions to eighteenth-century studies, science studies, and science fiction. He is the W.D. and Sara E. Trowbridge Professor of English at the University of Illinois at Urbana-Champaign, where he is also affiliated with Writing Studies and the Center for East Asian and Pacific Studies. He is an editor of the journal The Eighteenth Century and President of the Society for Literature, Science, and the Arts. The author of more than eighty articles in eighteenth-century studies, science studies, and new media, his recent books include Fallen Languages: Crises of Representation in Newtonian England (Cornell UP, 1993), Virtual Realities and Their Discontents (Johns Hopkins UP, 1996), Dying Planet: Mars in Science and the Imagination (Duke UP, 2005), and The Far East and the English Imagination, 1600-1730 (Cambridge UP, 2006). He has held fellowships from the National Endowment for the Humanities, the Huntington, Clark, and Beinecke Libraries, and most recently at the National Center for Supercomputing Applications. His study of the contemporary science-fiction novelist, Kim Stanley Robinson, is forthcoming from the University of Illinois Press next year.

== Life ==
Robert Markley is a graduate of Vassar College and the University of Pennsylvania. Prior to his work at the University of Illinois, Markley taught at several universities, including Tulane, the University of Washington, and West Virginia University, where he held the Jackson Distinguished Chair of British Literature.

== Publications ==
=== Books ===
- The Far East and the English Imagination 1600-1730. Cambridge: Cambridge University Press, 2006.
- Dying Planet: Mars in Science and the Imagination. Durham: Duke University Press, 2005.
- Fallen Languages: Crises of Representation in Newtonian England, 1660-1740. Ithaca: Cornell University Press, 1993.
- Two-Edg'd Weapons: Style and Ideology in the Comedies of Etherege, Wycherley, andCongreve. Oxford: Clarendon Press, 1988.
