= The Eighteenth Century: Theory and Interpretation =

- Discipline: Cultural studies
- Language: English
- Edited by: Tita Chico, Robert Markley, Jennifer Frangos, Emily Hodgson Anderson

Publication details
- Former names: Studies in Burke and His Time
- History: 1959-present
- Publisher: University of Pennsylvania Press (United States)
- Frequency: Quarterly

Standard abbreviations
- ISO 4: Eighteenth Century: Theory Interpret.

Indexing
- ISSN: 0193-5380 (print); 1935-0201 (web)
- LCCN: 80642257
- JSTOR: 01935380
- OCLC no.: 858834132

Links
- Journal homepage; Online access at Project MUSE

The Eighteenth Century: Theory and Interpretation is a quarterly peer-reviewed academic journal which focuses on Western culture from 1660 to 1830. The journal is published by the University of Pennsylvania Press. It is available online through Project MUSE and JSTOR. The journal was established in 1959 as Studies in Burke and His Time and obtained its current title in 1978. The editors-in-chief are Tita Chico (University of Maryland), Robert Markley (University of Illinois), Jennifer Frangos (University of Missouri-Kansas City) and Emily Hodgson Anderson (University of Southern California).
