= Joseph W. Bruno =

American academic

Joseph W. Bruno (born July 6, 1955) is an American academic and former university administrator. He became the 18th president of Marietta College on July 1, 2012. Dr. Bruno took over for Dr. Jean A. Scott, who retired after 12 years. Bruno stepped down as president of Marietta College in 2016.

== Education ==
Bruno graduated from Augustana College in 1978 with a Bachelor of Arts in Chemistry. He earned a Ph.D. in Organometallic Chemistry from Northwestern University in 1983.

== Career ==
Bruno began working at Wesleyan University in 1984 as a chemistry professor. In 2003, he became the Dean of Natural Sciences and Mathematics at Wesleyan until 2006. Bruno was the Vice President for Academic Affairs at Wesleyan University from 2006 until 2010.

Bruno was inaugurated as the president of Marietta College on October 12, 2012. Bruno, along with his wife, Diane, have instituted a few new programs — most notably Cooking 301 and Brunos' Choice Awards on campus to help connect the student body with the President and first lady.

On November 10, 2015 President Bruno announced that he would be leaving Marietta College at the end of the academic year to "pursue new professional challenges". His final day was May 13, 2016.
