= William Allison Shimer =

American professor of philosophy (1894-1983)

William Allison Shimer (1894-1983) was an American professor of philosophy. From 1932 to 1943 he served as the first editor of Phi Beta Kappa society's literary journal, The American Scholar. After a stint as president of Marietta College, he spent the latter part of his life teaching in Hawaii and working for the World Brotherhood, an international organization founded under the auspices of the National Conference of Christians and Jews.

== Early life ==
Shimer was born in Freed, West Virginia in 1894, and in 1914 he graduated from the Glenville State Normal School (now Glenville State College) in Glenville, West Virginia. Continuing his education, he "worked his way through Harvard". A 1945 biographical sketch described him as having been a "West Virginia farm boy who dared start Harvard University with only $50 in his pocket, insufficient credits", and went on to complete "four and a half years' work . . . in three years' time while living in an unheated room, living on a dollar's worth of food a week, and working for 25 cents an hour at all kinds of jobs in order to keep alive." In 1917 he received his A.B. degree from Harvard.

Shimer subsequently received a master's degree from the University of Rochester (1922), followed by a second master's degree (1923) and a Ph.D. (1925) from Harvard, where he wrote his dissertation on "The History and Validity of the Concept of Relativity". He taught philosophy at Ohio State and at Bucknell, where he also served as dean of the faculty. He met his first wife, Edith Richmond, when he was a Harvard undergraduate and she was a Radcliffe student; according to a 1940 New Yorker magazine profile, she was responsible for his being elected to Phi Beta Kappa in absentia while he was away from Harvard during World War I.

== Phi Beta Kappa and The American Scholar ==
In 1930 Shimer accepted the position of executive secretary of the United Chapters of Phi Beta Kappa. He conceived the idea for The American Scholar as a publication collecting scholarly work for a general audience, and he worked to gain support from a variety of publishers and academics, ultimately receiving approval from the Phi Beta Kappa Senate in September 1931. The first issue was released in January 1932. Shimer was the journal's editor for 12 years. In 1943 he resigned to join the armed services and served as a lieutenant in the United States Navy, commanding a unit of the V-12 Navy College Training Program.

== Marietta College ==
After World War II, Shimer was selected to become president of Marietta College in Ohio. Serving during a period of rapid post-war growth, he worked to expand the school's enrollment and physical plant. He hired the distinguished Swiss philosopher Fritz Marti to start a philosophy department at the college.

Shimer became embroiled in personal controversy after he was divorced from his first wife, and a year later married Dorothy Blair, the college's dean of women. The controversy was covered in the national media, and ultimately led to the board of trustees' July 1947 decision to force him from office, despite expressions of support from faculty, students, and townspeople.

== Hawaii and the World Brotherhood ==
Shimer and his wife Dorothy moved to Hawaii in 1947, and he taught at the University of Hawaii at Manoa. The Shimers also became involved with the World Brotherhood (later renamed the Council on World Tensions), an international organization founded under the auspices of the National Conference of Christians and Jews to promote understanding among different religions and cultures. They headed the Asia Pacific chapter of the organization, spent several years in Asia on its behalf, and edited its quarterly journal Brotherhood. Later, Shimer became a professor and librarian at Mauna'olu College, a now-closed community college near Paia, Maui; he retired in 1968.

== Writings ==
Along with many articles over the years, Shimer wrote a book entitled Conscious Clay: From science via philosophy to religion, published in 1948 by Charles Scribner's Sons, in which he argued for the existence of God as "the eternal all-inclusive reality".
