= Mars in culture =

Cultural depictions of the planet Mars

There once was a mission to Mars
That fell with a bounce from the stars
To study the mystery of life's early history
Preserved in the rocks & sand bars.

— P. Smith, University of Arizona,
on Mars Pathfinder, 1997

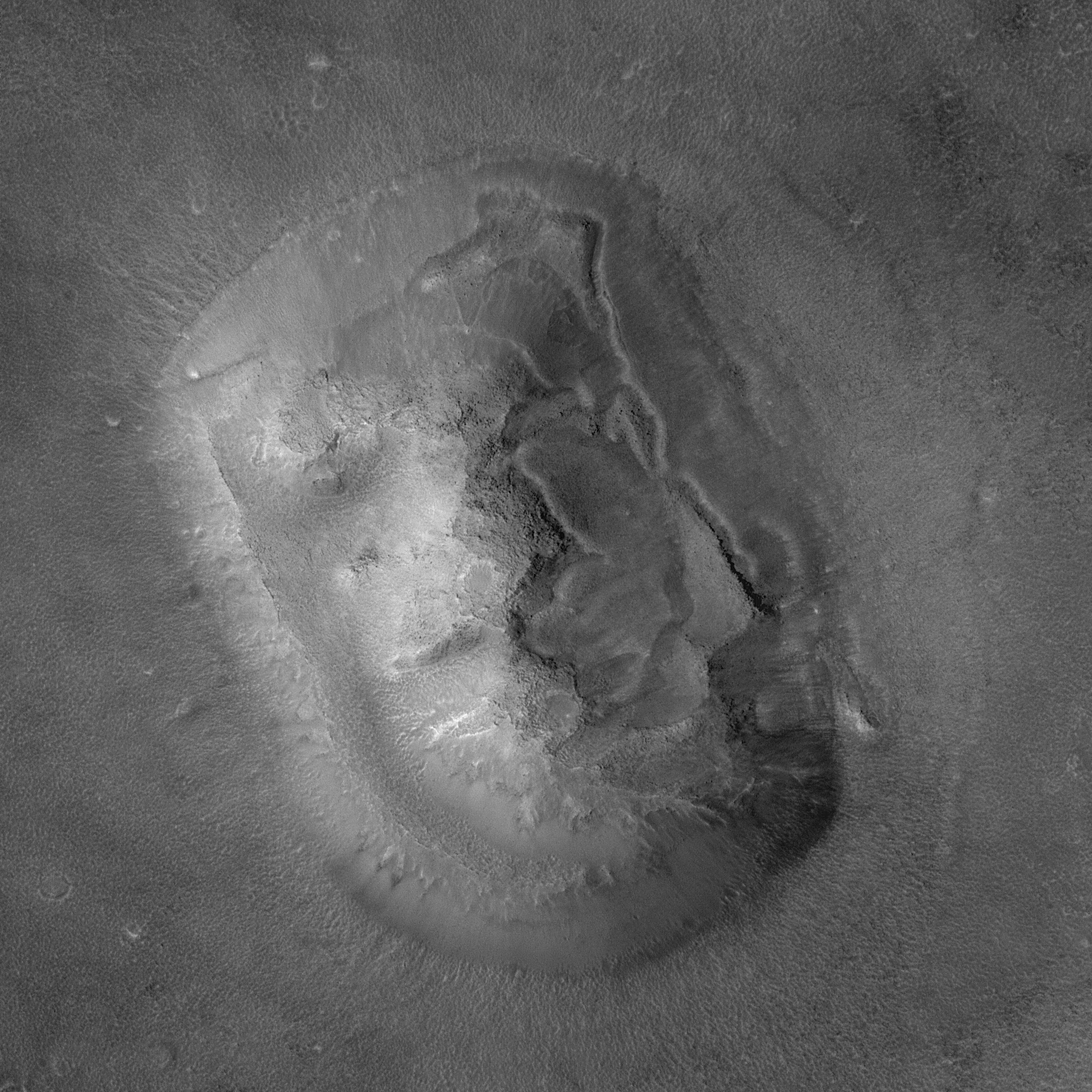
Martian geological features can trigger facial pareidolia, such as the "Face on Mars".

The planet Mars is named after the Roman god of war Mars. In Babylonian astronomy, the planet was named after Nergal, their deity of fire, war, and destruction, most likely due to the planet's reddish appearance. Whether the Greeks equated Nergal with their god of war, Ares, or whether both drew from a more ancient association is unclear. In the age of Plato, the Greeks called the planet Ἄρεως ἀστἡρ (Areos aster), or "star of Ares". Following the identification of Ares and Mars, it was translated into Latin as stella Martis, or "star of Mars", or simply Mars. The Hellenistic Greeks also called the planet Πυρόεις Pyroeis, meaning "fiery".

In the Skanda Purana, a Hindu religious text, Mars is known as the deity Mangala (मंगल) and was born from the sweat of Shiva. The planet is called Angaraka in Sanskrit, after the celibate god of war who possesses the signs of Aries and Scorpio, and teaches the occult sciences. The planet was known by the ancient Egyptians as "Horus of the Horizon", then later Her Deshur ("Ḥr Dšr"), or "Horus the Red". The Hebrews named it Ma'adim (מאדים) — "the one who blushes"; this is where one of the largest canyons on Mars, the Ma'adim Vallis, gets its name. The Sinosphere cultures refer to the planet as 火星, or the fire star, a name based on the ancient Chinese mythological cycle of Five elements. In ancient China, the advent of Mars was taken as a portent for "bane, grief, war and murder".

Its symbol, derived from Roman mythology, is a circle with a small arrow pointing out from behind. It is a stylized representation of a shield and spear used by the Roman God Mars. The modern symbol was first found to be written in Byzantine Greek manuscripts dated from the late Middle Ages. Mars in Roman mythology was the God of War and patron of warriors. This symbol is also used in biology to describe the male sex, and in alchemy to symbolise the element iron which was considered to be dominated by Mars whose characteristic red colour is coincidentally due to iron oxide. ♂ occupies Unicode position U+2642.

== Intelligent "Martians" ==
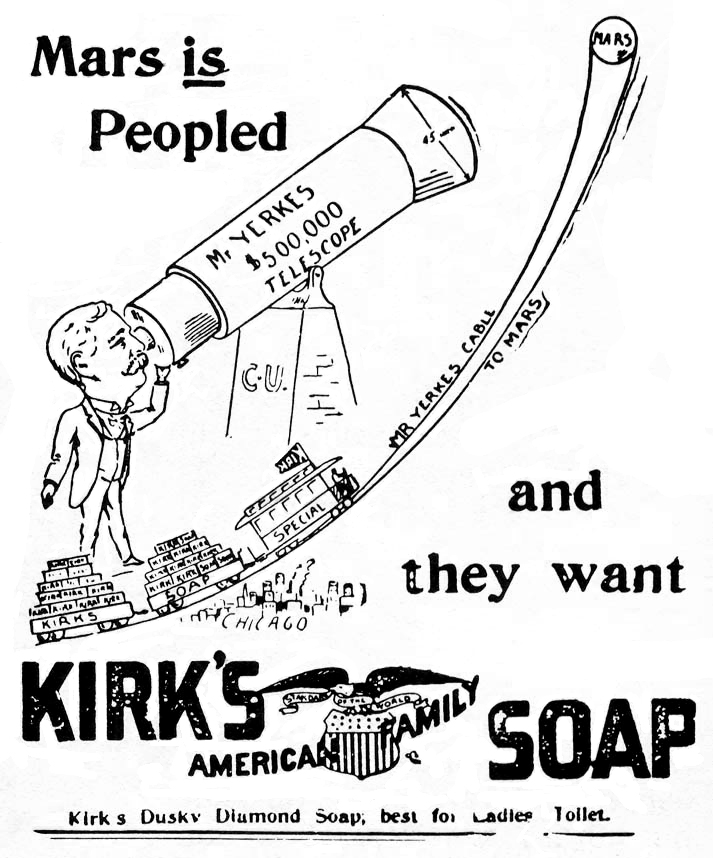
An 1893 soap ad playing on the popular idea that Mars was populated

The popular idea that Mars was populated by intelligent Martians exploded in the late 19th century. Schiaparelli's "canali" observations combined with Percival Lowell's books on the subject put forward the standard notion of a planet that was a drying, cooling, dying world with ancient civilizations constructing irrigation works.

Many other observations and proclamations by notable personalities added to what has been termed "Mars Fever". In 1899 while investigating atmospheric radio noise using his receivers in his Colorado Springs lab, inventor Nikola Tesla observed repetitive signals that he later surmised might have been radio communications coming from another planet, possibly Mars. In a 1901 interview Tesla said:

It was some time afterward when the thought flashed upon my mind that the disturbances I had observed might be due to an intelligent control. Although I could not decipher their meaning, it was impossible for me to think of them as having been entirely accidental. The feeling is constantly growing on me that I had been the first to hear the greeting of one planet to another.

Tesla's theories gained support from Lord Kelvin who, while visiting the United States in 1902, was reported to have said that he thought Tesla had picked up Martian signals being sent to the United States. Kelvin "emphatically" denied this report shortly before departing America: "What I really said was that the inhabitants of Mars, if there are any, were doubtless able to see New York, particularly the glare of the electricity."

In a New York Times article in 1901, Edward Charles Pickering, director of the Harvard College Observatory, said that they had received a telegram from Lowell Observatory in Arizona that seemed to confirm that Mars was trying to communicate with the Earth.

Early in December 1900, we received from Lowell Observatory in Arizona a telegram that a shaft of light had been seen to project from Mars (the Lowell observatory makes a specialty of Mars) lasting seventy minutes. I wired these facts to Europe and sent out neostyle copies through this country. The observer there is a careful, reliable man and there is no reason to doubt that the light existed. It was given as from a well-known geographical point on Mars. That was all. Now the story has gone the world over. In Europe it is stated that I have been in communication with Mars, and all sorts of exaggerations have spring up. Whatever the light was, we have no means of knowing. Whether it had intelligence or not, no one can say. It is absolutely inexplicable.

Pickering later proposed creating a set of mirrors in Texas with the intention of signaling Martians.

In recent decades, the high resolution mapping of the surface of Mars, culminating in Mars Global Surveyor, revealed no artifacts of habitation by 'intelligent' life, but pseudoscientific speculation about intelligent life on Mars continues from commentators such as Richard C. Hoagland. Reminiscent of the canali controversy, some speculations are based on small scale features perceived in the spacecraft images, such as 'pyramids' and the 'Face on Mars'. Planetary astronomer Carl Sagan wrote:

Mars has become a kind of mythic arena onto which we have projected our Earthly hopes and fears.

== See also ==
- List of films set on Mars
- Mars hoax email
- Virgle, an April Fools' joke
- Rene Joly, a person claiming to be an extraterrestrial in a Canadian court case
