= Gustav Müller (astronomer) =

German astronomer (1851 – 1925)

Karl Hermann Gustav Müller
- Born: 7 May 1851; Schweidnitz, Silesia
- Died: 7 July 1925 (aged 74); Potsdam, Germany
- Education: University of Leipzig, University of Berlin
- Scientific career
- Fields: Astronomy
- Workplaces: Astrophysical Observatory of Potsdam

Karl Hermann Gustav Müller (7 May 1851–7 July 1925) was a German astronomer.

He was born in Schweidnitz, Silesia to a merchant father; his father died when Gustav was six. In 1870 he entered the University of Leipzig, then transferred to the University of Berlin two years later. He was awarded a Ph.D. in 1877 with a thesis on the subject of micrometer screws. Thereupon he became an assistant at the Astrophysical Observatory of Potsdam. His primary career focus became the spectrum of the Sun and celestial photometry.

Between 1880–82, he assisted Hermann Carl Vogel in building a catalog of stellar spectra. In 1877 he began making photometric observations of the planets and their atmospheres. He led the German expedition to Hartford, Connecticut, to observe the transit of Venus in 1882. In 1886, he began a collaboration with Paul Kempf to assemble the Potsdam Durchmusterung, which was a stellar catalogue of all stars in the northern hemisphere with a magnitude of 7.5 or brighter. In 1897 he published the manual Die Photometrie der Gestirne (The Photometry of Stars). Between 1900 and 1915, he and Hartwig produced a three volume catalogue of 1,687 variable stars.

Between 1896 and 1924, he served as a secretary of the Astronomische Gesellschaft. In 1918 he was elected to the Prussian Academy of Sciences, and he would also become an associate of the Royal Astronomical Society in England. From 1917–1921 he was the director of the Astrophysical Observatory at Potsdam. Due to legal requirements, he retired in 1921 at the age of seventy. He was married three times and had seven children. One son was killed during World War I and a second in the aftermath. His son Rolf became an astronomer at the Potsdam Observatory.
