= Paul Kempf (astronomer) =

German astronomer (1856–1920)

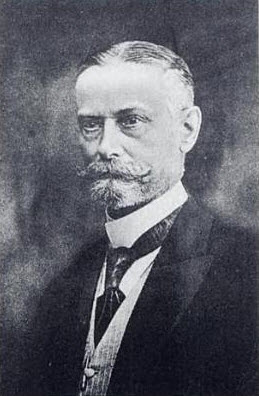

Paul Friedrich Ferdinand Kempf (3 June 1856 – 16 February 1920) was a German astronomer.

In 1878 Kempf was awarded a doctorate in astronomy from the Humboldt University of Berlin with a thesis titled Untersuchungen über die Ptolemäische Theorie der Mondbewegung (Investigations into the Ptolemaic theory of lunar movement). On 1 July the same year he became an assistant at the Astrophysical Institute Potsdam.

Early in his career as an astronomer he aided German solar astronomer Gustav Spörer in his work to observe sun spot activity. Kempf joined an 1882 German expedition to Chile to observe the transit of Venus across the Sun. He was then part of solar eclipse missions to Russia in 1887 and 1914. In 1886, he was promoted to full astronomer and began a collaboration with his friend, German astronomer Gustav Müller to perform a massive survey of northern stars with magnitudes brighter than 7.5 found in the Bonner Durchmusterung. This work was published between 1894 and 1906, with the completed so-called Potsdamer Photometrische Durchmusterung appearing in 1907. (Full name: "Photometrische Durchmusterung des Nördlichen Himmels, anthaltend alle sterne der B.D. bis zur Grösze 7.5"

In 1894 he was named as the principal observer at Potsdam. Kempf became secretary to the Astronomische Gesellschaft in 1914, then added the job of treasurer, holding both posts until his death. He was survived by his wife, Helene Marie Emilie Kempf, who became one of the first two female members of the Astronomische Gesellschaft in 1921.
