= Edgar W. Woolard =

American scientist and mathematician (1899-1978)

Edgar William Woolard (January 6, 1899 – June 17, 1978) was an American meteorologist, mathematician and planetary scientist.

He was born in El Paso, Texas and received his college education from the George Washington University in Washington, D.C. During World War I, Woolard served in the U.S. Army. In 1919, he was employed at the U.S. Weather Bureau as an assistant meteorologist, where he would remain until 1928. He resigned to join the faculty of George Washington University as a mathematics instructor. Woolard was granted his Ph.D. from the university with a thesis titled, On the Geometrical Theory of Halos, published in 1929. His was one of the first doctorates ever to be awarded in what was then the newly emerging science of meteorology. In 1938 he returned to the U.S. Weather Bureau, where he worked until the end of World War II.

In 1945, he joined the staff of the Nautical Almanac Office at the United States Naval Observatory, where he served as assistant director. He published a theory of nutation in 1953 that became an international standard model. Woolard was named director of the Nautical Almanac Office in 1958, and would remain in that post until 1963. He contributed a chapter on celestial mechanics to the work Fundamental Formulas of Physics, published in 1960, then in 1966 he collaborated with American astronomer Gerald M. Clemence to author the treatise Spherical Astronomy.

At his retirement, Woolard was awarded the Superior Civilian Service Award by the U.S. Army. During his career he was a frequent author and later editor for the Monthly Weather Review. He contributed articles for science and astronomy magazines. In 1978, he died in Kingman, Arizona.

== Bibliography ==
- Woolard, Edgar William; Clemence, Gerald Maurice (1966), Spherical Astronomy, New York: Academic Press
- Woolard, Edgar William (1953), "Theory of the rotation of the Earth around its center of mass", Astronomical Papers Prepared for the Use of the American Ephemeris and Nautical Almanac, 15, U.S. Government Printing Office: 1, Bibcode:1953USNAO..15....1W
