= Climate fiction =

Fiction in a setting defined in part by climate crisis

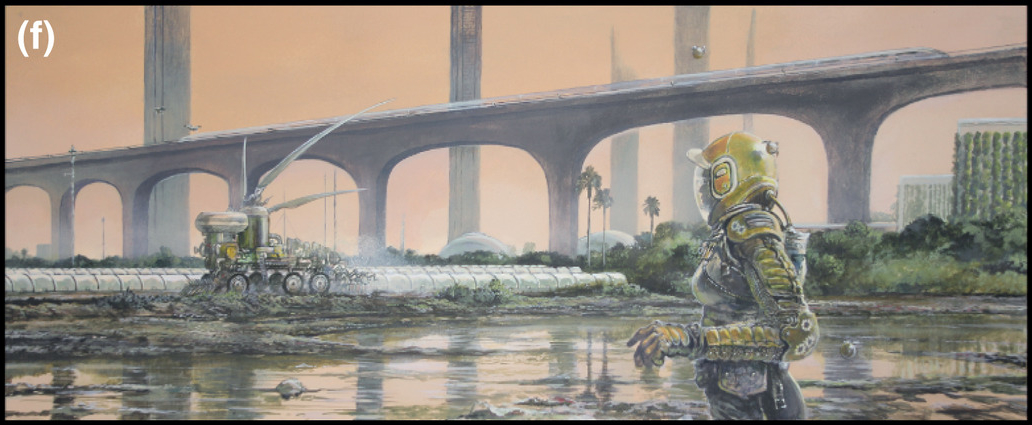
A climate fiction depiction of agriculture in India in 2500, with workers wearing protective suits to protect from extreme temperatures and drone tractors.

Climate fiction (sometimes shortened to cli-fi) is literature that deals with climate change. Generally speculative in nature but inspired by climate science, works of climate fiction may take place in the world as we know it, in the near future, or in fictional worlds experiencing climate change. The genre frequently includes science fiction and dystopian or utopian themes, imagining potential futures based on research about the impacts of climate change and speculations about how humans may respond to these and the problem of climate change. Climate fiction typically involves anthropogenic climate change and other environmental issues as opposed to weather and disaster more generally. Technologies such as climate engineering or climate adaptation practices often feature prominently in works exploring their impacts on society.

The publication of Kim Stanley Robinson's The Ministry for the Future in 2020 helped cement the genre's emergence; the work generated presidential and United Nations mentions and an invitation for Robinson to meet planners at the Pentagon. University courses on literature and environmental issues may include climate change fiction in their syllabi. This body of literature has been discussed by a variety of publications, including The New York Times, The Guardian, and Dissent magazine, among other international media outlets. Lists of climate fiction have been compiled by organizations including Grist, Outside Magazine, and the New York Public Library. Academics and critics study the potential impact of fiction on the broader field of climate change communication.

== Use of the phrase ==
The term "cli-fi" is generally credited to freelance news reporter and climate activist Dan Bloom, who coined it in either 2007 or 2008. References to "climate fiction" appear to have begun in the 2010s, although the term has also been retroactively applied to a number of works. Pioneering 20th century authors of climate fiction include J. G. Ballard and Octavia E. Butler, while dystopian fiction from Margaret Atwood is often cited as an immediate precursor to the genre's emergence. Since 2010, prominent cli-fi authors include Kim Stanley Robinson, Richard Powers, Paolo Bacigalupi, and Barbara Kingsolver.

Bloom had used the term to describe his novella Polar City Red, a post-apocalyptic story about climate refugees in Alaska set in 2075, which was not commercially successful. It later came into mainstream media use in April 2013, when Christian Science Monitor and NPR ran stories about a new literary movement of novels and films that dealt with human-induced climate change. Bloom had been critical of the lack of mention of his role in coining the term in these features. Scott Thill wrote in HuffPost in 2014 that he had popularised the term in 2009, inspired by the mixture of science and fiction in Franny Armstrong's film The Age of Stupid.

== History ==
Jules Verne's 1889 novel The Purchase of the North Pole imagines climate change due to tilting of Earth's axis. In his posthumous Paris in the Twentieth Century, written in 1863 and set during the 1960s, the eponymous city experiences a sudden drop in temperature, which lasts for three years.

Laurence Manning's 1933 serialized novel The Man Who Awoke has been described as an exemplary work of ecological science fiction from the golden age. It tells the story a man who awakes from suspended animation in various future eras and learns about the destruction to the Earth's climate, caused by overuse of fossil fuels, global warming, and deforestation. People of the future refer to 20th century humans as "the wasters". They have abandoned over-industrialization and consumerism to live in small self-sufficient villages based around genetically engineered trees that provide all their necessities. Isaac Asimov credited The Man Who Awoke for bringing the "energy crisis" to his attention 40 years before it became common knowledge in the 1970s.

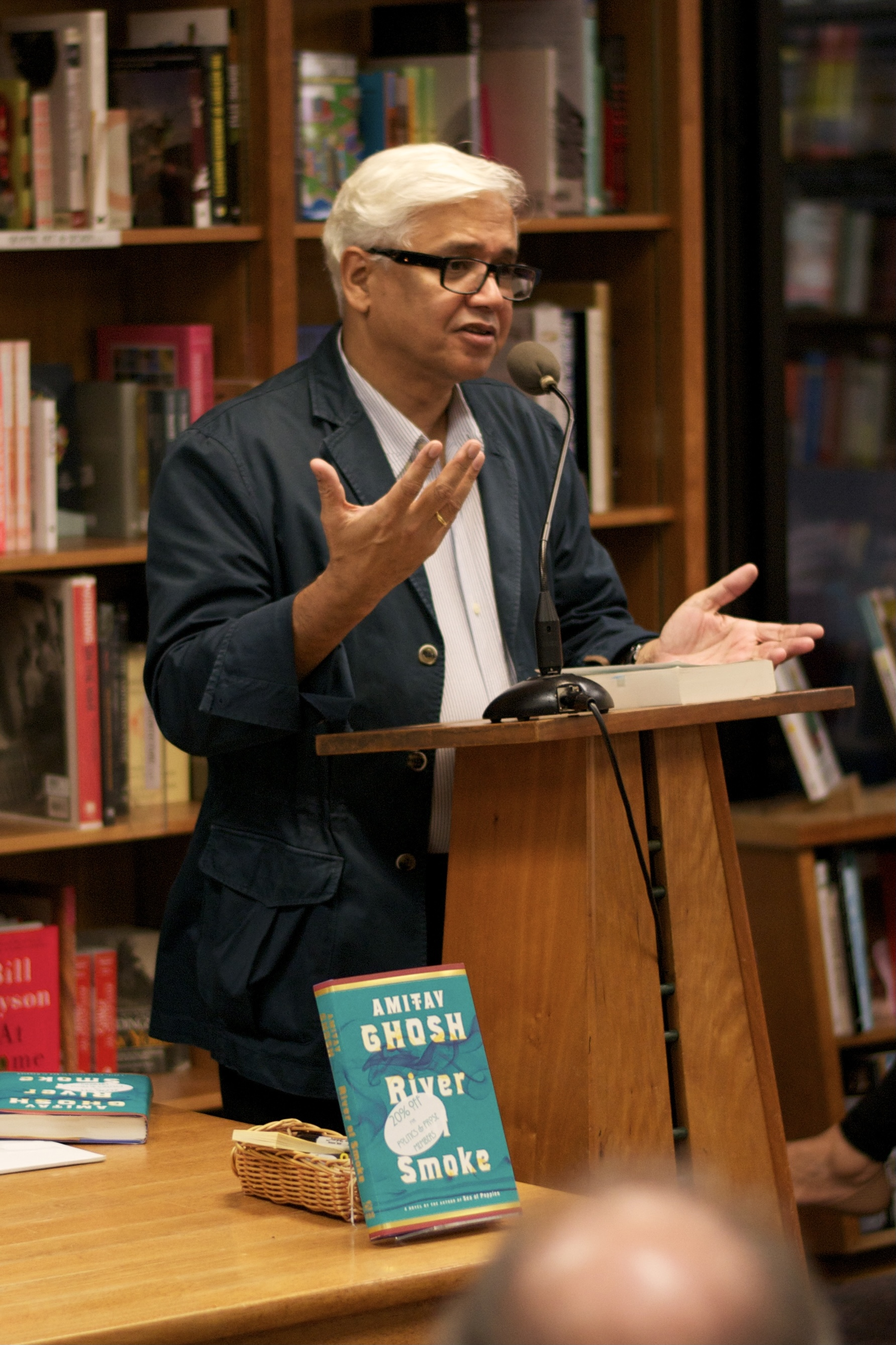
In 2016, Indian writer Amitav Ghosh described a lack of coverage of climate change in contemporary fiction as "the great derangement".

Several well-known dystopian works by British author J. G. Ballard deal with climate-related natural disasters. In The Wind from Nowhere (1961), civilization is devastated by persistent hurricane-force winds, and The Drowned World (1962) describes a future of melted ice-caps and rising sea-levels caused by solar radiation. In The Burning World (1964, later retitled The Drought) his climate catastrophe is human-made, a drought due to disruption of the precipitation cycle by industrial pollution.

Frank Herbert's 1965 science fiction novel Dune, set on a fictional desert planet, has been proposed as a pioneer of climate fiction for its themes of ecology and environmentalism.

Octavia E. Butler's Parable of the Sower (1993) imagines a near-future for the United States where climate change, wealth inequality, and corporate greed cause apocalyptic chaos. Here, and in sequel Parable of the Talents (1998), Butler dissects how instability and political demagoguery exacerbate society's underlying cruelty (especially with regards to racism and sexism) and also explores themes of survival and resilience. Butler wrote the novel "thinking about the future, thinking about the things that we're doing now and the kind of future we're buying for ourselves, if we're not careful."

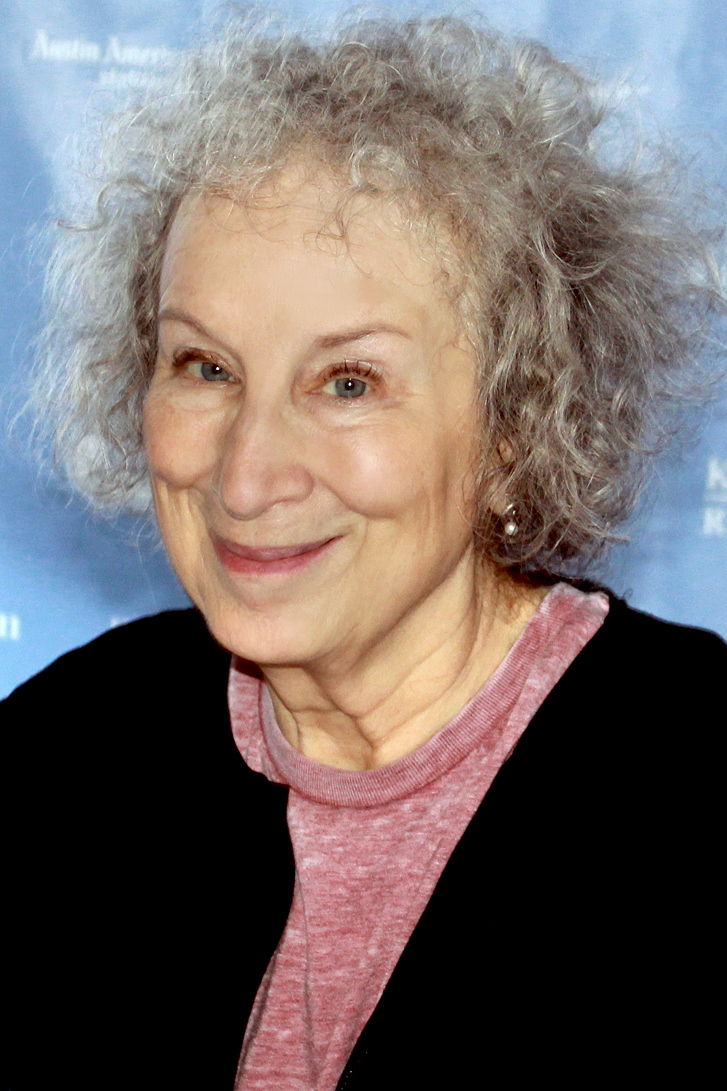
Margaret Atwood's Oryx and Crake series is an often cited dystopian novel in ecocriticism.

As scientific knowledge of the effects of fossil fuel consumption and resulting increase in atmospheric CO_{2} concentrations entered the public and political arena as "global warming", human-caused climate change entered works of fiction. Susan M. Gaines's Carbon Dreams (2000) was an early example of a literary novel that "tells a story about the devastatingly serious issue of human-induced climate change", set in the 1980s and published before the term "cli-fi" was coined. Michael Crichton's State of Fear (2004), a techno-thriller, was a bestseller upon its release but was criticised by scientists for portraying climate change as "a vast pseudo-scientific hoax" and rejecting the scientific consensus on climate change. Sigbjørn Skåden's novel Fugl (2019) is a Sámi novel written in Norwegian that weaves together environmental collapse with an allegory of colonialism.

Margaret Atwood explored the subject in her dystopian trilogy Oryx and Crake (2003), The Year of the Flood (2009) and MaddAddam (2013). In Oryx and Crake, Atwood presents a world where "social inequality, genetic technology and catastrophic climate change, has finally culminated in some apocalyptic event". The novel's protagonist, Jimmy, lives in a "world split between corporate compounds", gated communities that have grown into city-states and pleeblands, which are "unsafe, populous and polluted" urban areas where the working classes live.

In 2016, Indian writer Amitav Ghosh expressed concern that climate change had "a much smaller presence in contemporary literary fiction than it does even in public discussion". In The Great Derangement: Climate Change and the Unthinkable, Ghosh said "if certain literary forms are unable to negotiate these waters, then they will have failed – and their failures will have to be counted as an aspect of the broader imaginative and cultural failure that lies at the heart of the climate crisis." In The Anthropocene Unconscious: Climate Catastrophe Culture, critic Mark Bould suggests the opposite when he argues that the "art and literature of our time is pregnant with catastrophe, with weather and water, wildness and weirdness."

By the 2010s, climate fiction had attracted significant prominence and media attention. Cultural critic Josephine Livingston at The New Republic wrote in 2020 that "the last decade has seen such a steep rise in sophisticated 'cli-fi' that some literary publications now devote whole verticals to it. With such various and fertile imaginations at work on the same topic, whether in fiction or nonfiction, the challenge facing the environmental writer now is standing out from the crowd (not to mention the headlines)." She highlighted Jeff Vandermeer's Annihilation to Nathaniel Rich's Odds Against Tomorrow as examples.

The sole study to examine how common climate fiction is in contemporary literature found that just 10% of stories in The New Yorker from 2014 to 2023 included climate change in their story world. In 2% of the stories climate change was "a central part of the story," and in 3% climate change was "important but not central to the story." 9% of stories were classified as "symptomatic climate fiction," in which common climate impacts (such as severe storms, drought, and floods) are mentioned or depicted but they are not connected to climate change.

In African literature, climate informed novels and short stories have been recently receiving attention as a field of contemporary African literature. Books such as Eclipse our sins, by Tlotlo Tsamaase; It Doesn’t Have to Be This Way, by Alistair Mackay and Noor, by Nnedi Okorafor, have been highlighted as notable publications in the genre.

== Prominent examples ==
The popular science-fiction novelist Kim Stanley Robinson has been writing on the theme for several decades, including his Science in the Capital trilogy, which is set in the near future and includes Forty Signs of Rain (2004), Fifty Degrees Below (2005), and Sixty Days and Counting (2007). Robert K. J. Killheffer in his review for Fantasy & Science Fiction said "Forty Signs of Rain is a fascinating depiction of the workings of science and politics, and an urgent call to readers to confront the threat of climate change." Robinson's climate-themed novel, titled New York 2140, was published in March 2017. It gives a complex portrait of a coastal city that is partly underwater and yet has successfully adapted to climate change in its culture and ecology. Robinson's novel The Ministry for the Future, is set in the near future, and follows a subsidiary body, whose mission is to advocate for the world's future generations of citizens as if their rights are as valid as the present generation's.

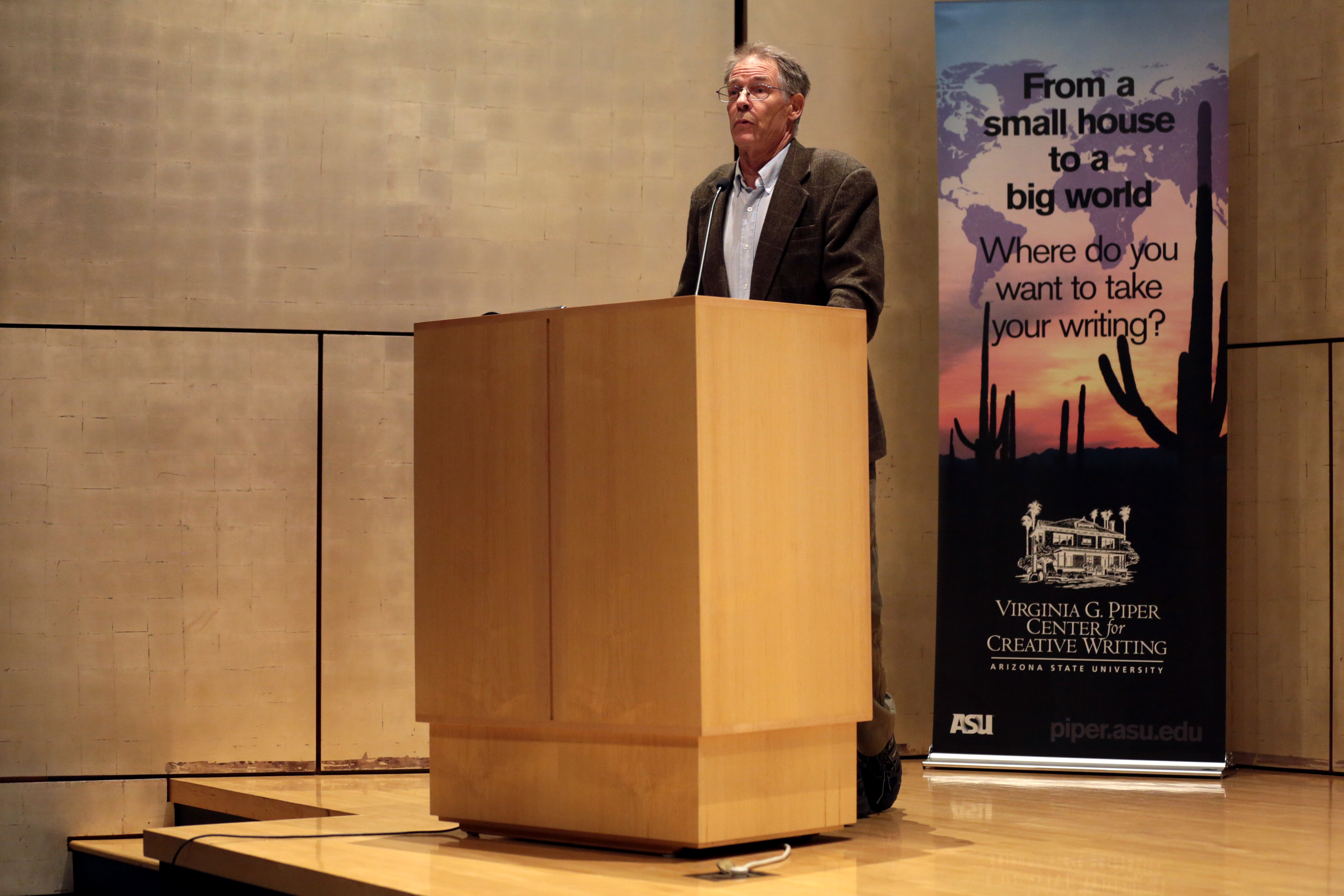
Kim Stanley Robinson's science fiction works frequently include society's response to climate change.

British author J. G. Ballard used the setting of apocalyptic climate change in his early science fiction novels. In The Wind from Nowhere (1961), civilisation is reduced by persistent hurricane-force winds. The Drowned World (1962) describes a future of melted ice-caps and rising sea-levels, caused by solar radiation, creating a landscape mirroring the collective unconscious desires of the main characters. In The Burning World (1964) a surrealistic psychological landscape is formed by drought due to industrial pollution disrupting the precipitation cycle.

Similarly, The Road (2006) by Cormac McCarthy is set after an unspecified apocalypse or environmental catastrophe. It won the Pulitzer Prize for Fiction in 2007. Although it does not explicitly mention climate change, it has been listed by The Guardian as one of the best climate change novels, and environmentalist George Monbiot has described it as "the most important environmental book ever written" for depicting a world without a biosphere.

The novel State of Fear by Michael Crichton, published in December 2004, describes a conspiracy by scientists and others to create public panic about global warming. Crichton had publicly advocated "skepticism" of global warming. His novel describes a group of eco-terrorists attempting to create natural disasters to convince the public of the dangers of global warming. It is based upon the idea that there is a deliberately alarmist conspiracy behind climate change activism. The book is critical of the scientific consensus on climate change. A critique in the BBC News pointed out that "Crichton's trade is to bring pleasurable terror to millions by spinning tales of science gone amok" and "To make sure you get his point, Crichton adds a 32-page footnote documenting his own conviction that global warming is an unscientific scare."

Ian McEwan's Solar (2010) follows the story of a physicist who discovers a way to fight climate change after managing to derive power from artificial photosynthesis. The Stone Gods (2007) by Jeanette Winterson is set on the fictional planet Orbus, a world very like Earth, running out of resources and suffering from the severe effects of climate change. Inhabitants of Orbus hope to take advantage of possibilities offered by a newly discovered planet, Planet Blue, which appears perfect for human life.

Other authors who have used this subject matter include:

- Fallen Angels (1991) by Larry Niven, Jerry Pournelle, and Michael Flynn. Set in North America in the "near future", a radical technophobic green movement dramatically cuts greenhouse gas emissions, only to find that manmade global warming was staving off a new ice age.
- Mother of Storms (1994) by John Barnes describes a catastrophic, rapid climate and weather change brought on by a nuclear explosion releasing clathrate compounds from the ocean floor, based on the clathrate gun hypothesis.
- The Swarm (2004) by Frank Schätzing. The book follows an ensemble of protagonists who are investigating what at first appear to be freak events related to the world's oceans. Seemingly unrelated events like the destabilization of the continental shelf resulting in a megatsunami, whales attacking a commercial freighter, and an outbreak of an epidemic caused by contaminated lobsters are revealed to be caused by an unknown submarine species trying to defend the oceans against human influence.
- Far North (2009) by Marcel Theroux, in which the world is largely uninhabitable due to climate change. However, the novel implies that scientists got it wrong and that it was our actions combating global warming that irrevocably altered the climate.
- Arctic Drift (2008) by Clive Cussler and Dirk Cussler. A thriller involving attempts to reverse global warming, a possible war between the United States and Canada, and "a mysterious silvery mineral traced to a long-ago expedition in search of the fabled Northwest Passage."
- Devolution of a Species by M.E. Ellington focuses on the Gaia hypothesis, and describes the Earth as a single living organism fighting back against humankind.
- The Carbon Diaries: 2015 (2009) by Saci Lloyd is set in a future where power is scarce and the UK has just begun carbon rationing. The story is told in diary form by Laura Brown, a teenager living in London in the aftermath of the Great Storm.
- Barbara Kingsolver's novel, Flight Behavior (2012), employs environmental themes and highlights the potential effects of global warming on the monarch butterfly.
- Norwegian author Maja Lunde has released a "Climate Quartet" of novels, beginning with Bienes histore (The History of Bees) in 2015, which examines pollinator decline through a number of human storylines throughout history, followed by The End of the Ocean (2017), Przewalski's Horse (2019) and an upcoming fourth instalment.
- Rajat Chaudhuri’s novel, The Butterfly Effect (2018), is a dystopian cli-fi with thriller undercurrents that deals with genetic engineering, scientific experiments gone wrong and the effect of intertwined disasters. This book has been listed by Book Riot as one of "50 Must-Read Eco Disasters In Fiction".
- The New Wilderness (2020) by Diane Cook is set in North America where climate change has affected the natural environment. It was shortlisted for the 2020 Booker Prize.
- Bewilderment (2021) by Richard Powers was shortlisted for the 2021 Booker Prize. It was also longlisted for the 2021 National Book Award for Fiction. It was selected by Oprah Winfrey as part of Oprah's Book Club on 28 September 2021.

=== Description of apocalyptic scenarios ===
"Climate apocalypse scenarios" are explored in multiple science fiction works. For example, in The Wind from Nowhere (1961), civilization is devastated by persistent hurricane-force winds, and The Drowned World (1962) describes a future of melted ice-caps and rising sea-levels caused by solar radiation. In The Burning World (1964, later retitled The Drought) his climate catastrophe is human-made, a drought due to disruption of the precipitation cycle by industrial pollution.

Octavia E. Butler's Parable of the Sower (1993) imagines a near-future for the United States where climate change, wealth inequality, and corporate greed cause apocalyptic chaos. Here, and in sequel Parable of the Talents (1998), Butler dissects how instability and political demagoguery exacerbate society's underlying cruelty (especially with regards to racism and sexism) and also explores themes of survival and resilience. Butler wrote the novel "thinking about the future, thinking about the things that we're doing now and the kind of future we're buying for ourselves, if we're not careful."

Margaret Atwood explored the subject in her dystopian trilogy Oryx and Crake (2003), The Year of the Flood (2009) and MaddAddam (2013). In Oryx and Crake, Atwood presents a world where "social inequality, genetic technology and catastrophic climate change, has finally culminated in some apocalyptic event".

== Other examples ==
- Heat (1977), by Arthur Herzog, US
- The Sea and Summer [Drowning Towers] (1987), by George Turner, Australia
- The Crystal World (1988), by J. G. Ballard, UK
- The Ice People (1998) and The Flood (2004), Magee Gee, US
- Earth (1990), David Brin, US
- A Friend of the Earth (2000), T.C. Boyle, US
- Floodland (2001) and Aurora (2011), Marcus Sedgwick, US
- Exodus (2002) and sequels, Julie Bertagna, US
- Flood (2008) and Ark (2009), Stephen Baxter, US
- The Windup Girl (2009), Ship Breaker (2010), The Drowned Cities (2012), The Water Knife (2015) and Tool of War (2017), Paolo Bacigalupi, US
- Empire Builders (2011), Ben Bova, US
- 2312 (2012), Kim Stanley Robinson, US
- Odds Against Tomorrow (2013), Nathaniel Rich, US
- The Bone Clocks (2014), David Mitchell, UK
- The Collapse of Western Civilization (2014), by Naomi Oreskes and Erik M. Conway, Columbia University Press, US
- Memory of Water (2015), Emmi Itäranta, Finland
- Gold Fame Citrus (2015), Claire Vaye Watkins, US
- American War (2017), Omar El Akkad, US
- The Water Cure (2018), Sophie Mackintosh, UK
- The Last Children of Tokyo (The Emissary) (2018), Yoko Tawada, Germany/Japan
- Gun Island (2019) by Amitav Ghosh
- The Wall (2019), by John Lanchester
- The Ministry for the Future (2020), by Kim Stanley Robinson
- A Children's Bible (2020) by Lydia Millet
- Migrations (2020) by Charlotte McConaghy
- Depart, Depart (2020) by Sim Kern
- 470 (2020) by Linda Woodrow
- Diatomea (2022), by Núria Perpinyà
- The Light Pirate (2022), by Lily Brooks-Dalton
- Spellcasters: A Novel (2023), by Rajat Chaudhuri, India
- The Deluge (2023) by Stephen Markley
- The Girl who Rode the Unihorn (2024) by mìcheal dubh
- Juice (2024) by Tim Winton
- Fairhaven (2024) by Jan Lee and Steve Willis
- Wild Wise Weird (2024), by Quan-Hoang Vuong.

== Anthologies and collections ==
- Welcome to the Greenhouse (2011) US edited by Gordon Van Gelder
- Loosed Upon the World: The Saga Anthology of Climate Fiction (2015) US edited by John Joseph Adams
- Drowned Worlds (2016) UK edited by Jonathan Strahan
- Possible Solutions (2017) US by Helen Phillips – Many of the short stories concern climate change.
- Author and editor Bruce Meyer and creative writing professor at Georgian College edited a 2017 anthology of stories about "changing ocean conditions, the widening disappearance of species, genetically modified organisms, increasing food shortages, mass migrations of refugees, and the hubris behind our provoking Mother Earth herself", which he labels as "cli-fi". The anthology includes works by George McWhirter, Richard Van Camp, Holly Schofield, Linda Rogers, Sean Virgo, Rati Mehrotra, Geoffrey W. Cole, Phil Dwyer, Kate Story, Leslie Goodreid, Nina Munteanu, Halli Villegas, John Oughton, Frank Westcott, Wendy Bone, Peter Timmerman, and Lynn Hutchinson-Lee.
- Meteotopia - Futures of Climate (In)Justice (2022) Collection of short stories on climate and environment by authors of the Global South.
- The Routledge Anthology of Climate Fiction, Volume One (2024) edited by Bill Gillard, a short story collection that makes the argument that the literature of climate change started much earlier than the critical consensus would have it, as early as the 1870s when the effects of industrialization were being explored by science-fiction writers and other artists.

== Influence ==
Many journalists, literary critics, and scholars have speculated about the potential influence of climate fiction on the beliefs of its readers. To date, three empirical studies have examined this question.

A controlled experiment found that reading climate fiction short stories "had small but significant positive effects on several important beliefs and attitudes about global warming – observed immediately after participants read the stories", though "these effects diminished to statistical nonsignificance after a one-month interval". However, the authors note that "the effects of a single exposure in an artificial setting may represent a lower bound of the real-world effects. Reading climate fiction in the real world often involves multiple exposures and longer narratives", such as novels, "which may result in larger and longer-lasting impacts".

A survey of readers found that readers of climate fiction "are younger, more liberal, and more concerned about climate change than nonreaders", and that climate fiction "reminds concerned readers of the severity of climate change while impelling them to imagine environmental futures and consider the impact of climate change on human and nonhuman life. However, the actions that resulted from readers' heightened consciousness reveal that awareness is only as valuable as the cultural messages about possible actions to take that are in circulation. Moreover, the responses of some readers suggest that works of climate fiction might lead some people to associate climate change with intensely negative emotions, which could prove counterproductive to efforts at environmental engagement or persuasion."

An empirical study focused on the popular novel The Water Knife found that cautionary climate fiction set in a dystopic future can be effective at educating readers about climate injustice and leading readers to empathize with the victims of climate change, including environmental migrants. However, its results suggest that dystopic climate narratives might lead to support for reactionary responses to climate change. Based on this result, it cautioned that "not all climate fiction is progressive", despite the hopes of many authors, critics, and readers.

== See also ==
- Apocalyptic and post-apocalyptic fiction
- Climate apocalypse
- Ecofiction
- Climate change in popular culture
- Climate Fiction Prize
- Media coverage of climate change
- Mundane science fiction
- Petrofiction
- Public opinion on climate change
- Solarpunk
- Utopian and dystopian fiction
