= Climate apocalypse =

Term to describe possible catastrophic events due to climate change

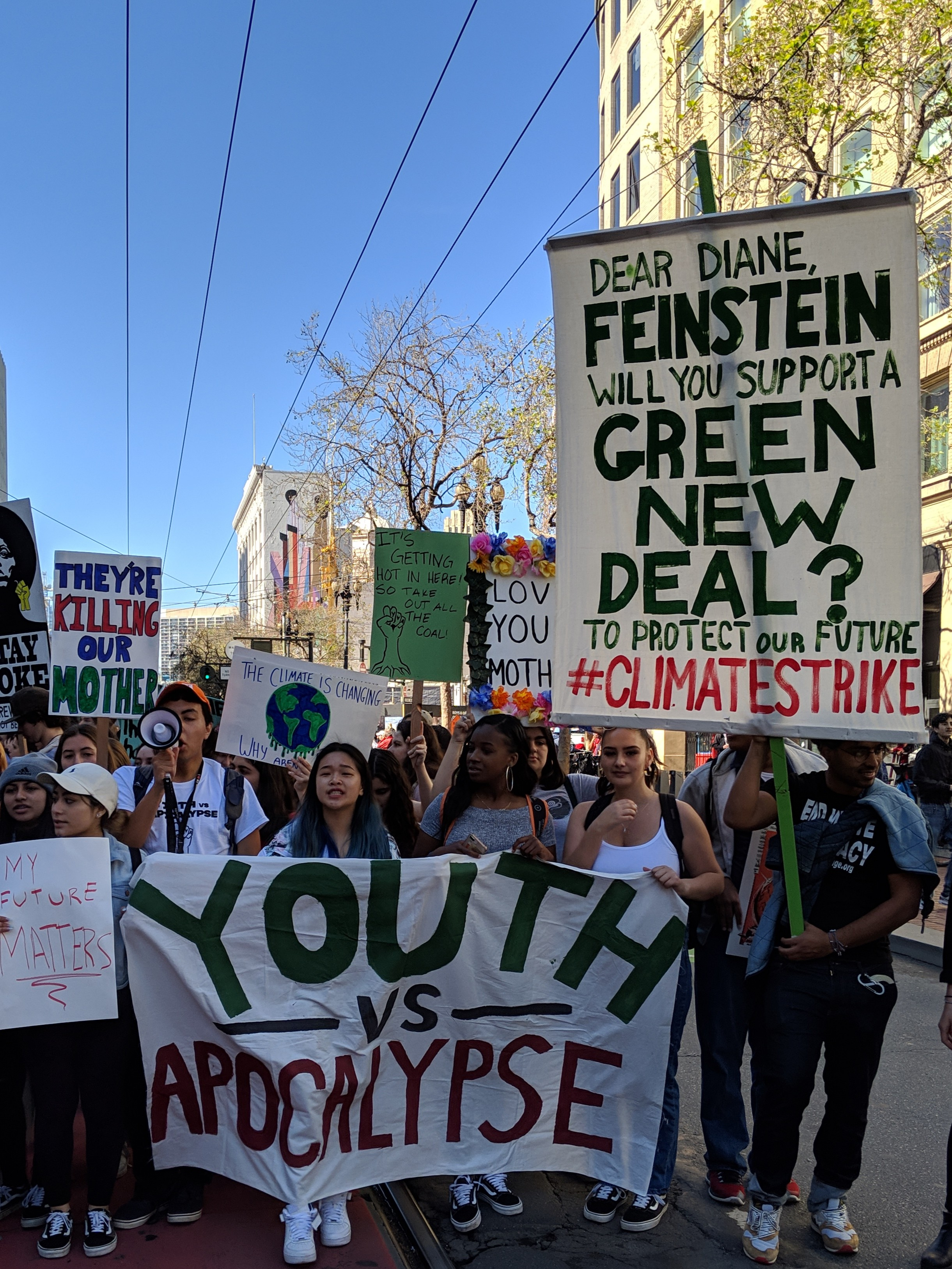
Marchers holding a banner with the words "Youth vs Apocalypse". San Francisco Youth Climate Strike – March 15, 2019.

A climate apocalypse is a term used to denote a predicted scenario involving the global collapse of human civilization due to climate change. Such collapse could theoretically arrive through a set of interrelated concurrent factors such as famine, extreme weather, war and conflict, and disease. There are many similar terms in use such as climate dystopia, collapse, endgame, and catastrophe.

== Meaning of the term ==
A climate apocalypse could theoretically arrive through a set of interrelated concurrent factors such as famine (crop loss, drought), extreme weather (hurricanes, floods), war (caused by the scarce resources) and conflict, systemic risk (relating to migration, famine, or conflict), and disease.

=== Scientific consensus regarding likelihood ===
Climate change and civilizational collapse refers to a hypothetical risk that the negative impacts of climate change might reduce global socioeconomic complexity to the point that complex human civilization effectively ends around the world, with humanity reduced to a less developed state. This hypothetical risk is typically associated with the idea of a massive reduction of human population caused by the direct and indirect impacts of climate change, and also with a permanent reduction of Earth's carrying capacity. Finally, it is sometimes suggested that a civilizational collapse caused by climate change would soon be followed by human extinction.

== Origin ==
Rhetoric and belief centered on apocalypticism has deep roots in religious contexts, and similar rhetorical approaches undergird secular apocalyptic interpretations of climate. Historical interpretations fall into two visions of apocalypse: the tragic and the comic. Tragic apocalypticism frames a clearly divided good and evil, with preordained events. In contrast, comic framing emphasizes flawed human agency, and it tends to be characterized by an open-ended, episodic, and ongoing timeline. Some of the most significant books in environmentalism make use of either the tragic or comic apocalyptic framing: Rachel Carson's Silent Spring (1962), Paul and Anne Ehrlich's The Population Bomb (1972), and Al Gore's Earth in the Balance (1992).

There is a Western world tradition of describing a climate apocalypse with images and descriptions of the Four Horsemen of the Apocalypse and other features of the apocalypse of the Christian faith.

== Usage ==
=== In fiction ===
"Climate apocalypse scenarios" are explored in multiple science fiction works. For example, in The Wind from Nowhere (1961), civilization is devastated by persistent hurricane-force winds, and The Drowned World (1962) describes a future of melted ice-caps and rising sea-levels caused by solar radiation. In The Burning World (1964, later retitled The Drought) his climate catastrophe is human-made, a drought due to disruption of the precipitation cycle by industrial pollution.

Octavia E. Butler's Parable of the Sower (1993) imagines a near-future for the United States where climate change, wealth inequality, and corporate greed cause apocalyptic chaos. Here, and in sequel Parable of the Talents (1998), Butler dissects how instability and political demagoguery exacerbate society's underlying cruelty (especially with regards to racism and sexism) and also explores themes of survival and resilience. Butler wrote the novel "thinking about the future, thinking about the things that we're doing now and the kind of future we're buying for ourselves, if we're not careful."

Margaret Atwood explored the subject in her dystopian trilogy Oryx and Crake (2003), The Year of the Flood (2009) and MaddAddam (2013). In Oryx and Crake, Atwood presents a world where "social inequality, genetic technology and catastrophic climate change, has finally culminated in some apocalyptic event".

== Reception ==
Some researchers have speculated that society cannot comprehend an accurate end of the world prediction, and instead, more governments would be willing to respond productively to prevent catastrophe if reports framed the matter as a smaller problem than it actually is. Talking about potential disaster can have a broad impact upon society by making many people feel that if the situation were truly horrible, then there must be good plans to prevent it so no further action is needed.

== Related terminology ==
Climate endgame is a term used to refer to the risk of societal collapse and potential human extinction due to the effects of climate change. The usage of the term seeks to improve risk management by putting a higher priority on worst-case scenarios, to "galvanise action, improve resilience, and inform policy". The term endgame has been used in relation to climate change by other authors in the past, like in The Extinction Curve book by John van der Velden and Rob White, published in 2021.

== See also ==
- Abrupt climate change
- Climate crisis
- Collapsology
- Deep Adaptation
- Global catastrophe scenarios
- Global catastrophic risk
- Human extinction
