= Ecofiction =

Nature or environment-oriented literature

Ecofiction (also "eco-fiction" or "eco fiction") is the branch of literature that encompasses nature or environment-oriented works of fiction. While this super genre's roots are seen in classic, pastoral, magical realism, animal metamorphoses, science fiction, and other genres, the term ecofiction did not become popular until the 1960s when various movements created the platform for an explosion of environmental and nature literature, which also inspired ecocriticism. Ecocriticism is the study of literature and the environment from an interdisciplinary point of view, where literature scholars analyze texts that illustrate environmental concerns and examine the various ways literature treats the subject of nature. Environmentalists have claimed that the human relationship with the ecosystem often went unremarked in earlier literature.

According to Jim Dwyer, author of Where the Wild Books Are: A Field Guide to Ecofiction, "My criteria for determining whether a given work is ecofiction closely parallel Lawrence Buell's":

- The nonhuman environment is present not merely as a framing device but as a presence that begins to suggest that human history is implicated in natural history.
- The human interest is not understood to be the only legitimate interest.
- Human accountability to the environment is part of the text's ethical orientation.
- Some sense of the environment as a process rather than as a constant or a given is at least implicit in the text.

== Definitions and explanations ==
"The terms 'environmental fiction,' 'green fiction,' and 'nature-oriented fiction,' might better be considered as categories of ecofiction....[Ecofiction] deals with environmental issues or the relation between humanity and the physical environment, that contrasts traditional and industrial cosmologies, or in which nature or the land has a prominent role...[It is] made up of many styles, primarily modernism, postmodernism, realism, and magical realism, and can be found in many genres, primarily mainstream, westerns, mystery, romance, and speculative fiction. Speculative fiction includes science fiction and fantasy, sometimes mixed with realism, as in the work of Ursula K. Le Guin." -Jim Dwyer [Ibid. Chapter 2.]

"Stories set in fictional landscapes that capture the essence of natural ecosystems....[They] can build around human relationships to these ecosystems or leave out humans altogether. The story itself, however, takes the reader into the natural world and brings it alive...Ideally the landscape and ecosystems—whether fantasy or real—should be as "realistic" as possible and plot constraints should accord with ecological principles." -Mike Vasey

The distinction of true and false ecofiction was made by Diane Ackerman. "Often in fiction nature has loomed as a monstrous character, an adversary dishing out retribution for moral slippage, or as a nightmare region of chaos and horror where fanged beasts crouch ready to attack. But sometimes it beckons as a zone of magic, mysticism, inspiration, and holy conversion. "False ecofiction is based on the fear that something will go wrong, but true ecofiction is based on an integrative view of reality." -Gabriel Navarre

Another perspective is that ecofiction is not divided between true and false, but into three categories: "Works that portray the environmental movement and/or environmental activism, works that depict a conflict over an environmental issue and express the author's beliefs, and works that feature environmental apocalypse." -Patricia D. Netzley

"Ecofiction is an elastic term, capacious enough to accommodate a variety of fictional works that address the relationship between natural settings and the human communities that dwell within them. The term emerged soon after ecology took hold as a popular scientific paradigm and a broad cultural attitude in the 1960s and 1970s." -Jonathan Levin

== Characteristics ==
Given that "Ecocriticism seems to be inherently interdisciplinary, cross-cultural, syncretic, holistic, and evolutionary in its nature," it would seem useful to apply these traits to the large field of literature that is ecofiction, especially given its history, reach, and continuity.

Interdisciplinary and holistic: Ecofiction can be seen as an umbrella for, or laterally relative to, many genres and subgenres and works well within the parameters of the main categories of speculative fiction, contemporary fiction, Anthropocene fiction, climate fiction, literary fiction, eco-futurist and solarpunk fictions, magical realism, ecological weird fiction, and more. Further, while ecofiction is "fiction with a conscience," per John Yunker, as shown above, it reveals integrity in the concern for our natural world as well as what can be found on numerous storytelling platforms: mystery, thriller, suspense, romance, dystopian, apocalyptic and post-apocalyptic, Arcadian, futuristic, crime, detective, and so on. Given the upstream and downstream effects of such issues as climate change, fracking, coal mining, animal justice, pollution, deforestation, and so on, this branch of fiction is not inclusive and has no demarcation other than the environmental and nature impacts by which it is defined and explained.

Cross-cultural and syncretic: Ecofiction is written by authors all over the world. Environmental issues, the desire to protect our natural ecological systems, and the praise of nature is the intention of many authors, which crosses all borders, languages, ethnicities, and belief systems. Many ecofiction novels incorporate LGBT and other egalitarian social issues that mirror sustainable, peaceful, and just environmental futures.

Developing: Dwyer's field guide has hundreds of examples of ecofiction across time, from the roots and precursors---the earliest cave drawings, pastoral and classic, etc.--up through the 21st century. The continuity goes on. In May 2017, writing in The New York Times, Yale scholar Wai Chee Dimock reviewed Jeff VanderMeer's novel Borne and said, "This coming-of-age story signals that eco-fiction has come of age as well: wilder, more reckless and more breathtaking than previously thought, a wager and a promise that what emerges from the 21st century will be as good as any from the 20th, or the 19th." Two months later, The Association for the Study of Literature and Environment's (ASLE) 17th biennial conference focused on ecofiction as one of its main streams. Ecofiction continues to be alive and relevant, evolving into contemporary study and a way of thinking about new literature.

Ecofiction, true to its evolutionary nature, encapsulates the most recent of our environmental crises: climate change. By the time Dwyer's big field study was published in 2010, already climate change had been engaging authors to write cautionary or disaster tales for a few decades. In his field guide, Dwyer cited such examples of climate change fiction as The Swarm and The Day After Tomorrow—also noting that "Ecofiction rarely fares well in escapist Hollywood." [Ibid. p. 92.] The first anthropogenic global warming (AGW) novel may have been Arthur Herzog's Heat, published in 1977, though plenty of novels up until then imagined or speculated climate change or events. While ecofiction has included AGW fiction since the 1970s, the past decade has also introduced newer specific genres to handle climate change, such as climate fiction, Anthroprocene fiction, and solarpunk. Thus, true to the evolutionary characteristic of ecofiction, from early pastoralism to modern science's understanding of global warming, hundreds of authors have taken up the issue of climate change in the least as a backdrop to their novels or, more heavily, as a moral, didactic cautionary tale centering around this foreboding, current, and very real environmental catastrophe. An environmental fiction database lists hundreds of climate and other novels falling into the ecofiction genre. There is also evidence of emergent hybrid sub-genres such as the new ultra-short science-fiction form termed 'Eco-Sci-Fi Flash Fiction'.

== History ==
While the term "ecofiction" is contemporary, as of the 1970s, its precursors are ancient and include many First People's fictionalizing nature in written form, including pictograms, petroglyphs, and creation myths. Classical literature, such as Ovid's Metamorphoses and Latin pastoral literature, continued this exaltation of nature as did Medieval European literature, such as Arthurian lore and Shakespeare's tales, followed by Romanticism, traditional pastoralism, and transcendentalism.

Dwyer notes that Kenneth Grahame's The Wind and The Willows, as well as many nonfiction authors, such as Ralph Waldo Emerson, Henry David Thoreau, John Burroughs, Margaret Fuller, and John Muir, had "strong influences on modern ecological thought, environmentalism, and ecofiction."

Up through the late 19th century, classics such as Herman Melville's Moby Dick, Mark Twain's The Adventures of Huckleberry Finn, H.G. Wells' The Island of Dr. Moreau, W.H. Hudson's A Crystal Age, and Sarah Orne Jewett's The White Heron and Other Stories and The Country of Pointed Firs, among many others, had eco-themes. In the 20th and 21st centuries, nature-related fiction evolved and continued, including eco-feminist fiction writers such as Charlotte Perkins Gilman and Mary Austin. Four "radical" authors also came on the scene: Jack London, D.H. Lawrence, B. Traven, and Upton Sinclair. Environmental science fiction also became popular from authors like Laurence Manning, George Orwell, William Golding, and Aldous Huxley. Regional environmentalists and authors, such as Zora Neale Hutson, William Faulkner, and John Steinbeck, also wrote about problems in their locales. Conservationists and environmentalists, such as Wallace Stegner and George R. Stewart, also contributed. J.R.R. Tolkien's mythology classics went down into history showing famous and iconic battles of industrialization vs. nature. Postwar ecofiction writers arrived too, such as science fiction authors who were cautionary about the environment: Clifford Simak, Jack Vance, Ray Bradbury, and Kurt Vonnegut, to name a few. Enter Peter Matthiessen and Edward Abbey, which Dwyer says are "arguably the most important and enduring new green voices to emerge in this period." And others, such as Jack Kerouac, Gary Snyder, and Michael McClure, represented "presentations of the nascent environmental consciousness of the Beat movement." [Ibid.]

This brings us up to the 1970s, when, as Dwyer points out, "ecofiction in all genres truly flourished...which might be considered the década de oro (golden age)," heralded by John Stadler's anthology Eco-fiction, containing science and mainstream ecofiction written between the 1920s and 1960s. [Ibid.]

Eco-fiction, the anthology, starts with this premise: "The earth is an eco-system. It possesses a collective memory. Everything that happens, no matter how insignificant it may seem, affects in some way at some time the existence of everything else within that system. Eco-fiction raises important questions about man's place in the system: Will man continue to ignore the warnings of the environment and destroy his source of life? Will he follow the herd into the slaughterhouse?" The anthology included the authors Ray Bradbury, John Steinbeck, Edgar Allan Poe, A. E. Coppard, James Agee, Robert M. Coates, Daphne du Maurier, Robley Wilson Jr., E. B. White, J. F. Powers, Kurt Vonnegut Jr., Sarah Orne Jewett, Frank Herbert, H. H. Munro, J. G. Ballard, Steven Scharder, Isaac Asimov, and William Saroyan. Dwyer stated that the title of Stadler's Eco-fiction was his first knowledge of the term ecofiction. [Ibid.]

Jonathan Levin goes on to explain, "Two key events helped spark this new environmental awareness [leading to ecofiction]: the controversy surrounding proposed dams on the Colorado River that led ultimately to the construction of the Glen Canyon Dam (begun in the mid-1950s and completed about ten years later), and the 1962 publication of Silent Spring, Rachel Carson's exposé of the environmental impact of toxic pesticides like DDT. Both generated widespread media coverage, bringing complex and urgent environmental issues and the ecological vocabularies that helped explain them into the American lexicon."

== Popularity ==
Just one study has examined how common environmental literature is. In an article published in 2026, researchers analyzed on the short stories published between 2014 and 2023 in The New Yorker, the most prestigious Anglophone literary magazine in the world. They found that a major environmental problem (climate change, freshwater pollution, marine pollution, air pollution, deforestation, species extinction / biodiversity loss, or toxic waste) existed in the story worlds of 20.9% of all stories. 2% of stories were "eco lit," in which "an environmental problem (or problems) is (are) central to the story," and 4% of stories were categorized as "eco-lite," in which "an environmental problem (or problems) is (are) important but not central to the story."

== Social impact ==
Ecofiction is often said to be an agent for social change. For example, in 2016, the World Economic Forum's Rosamund Hutt listed "9 novels that changed the world." Among these were two novels that may be considered ecofiction, including John Steinbeck's The Grapes of Wrath (about the dust bowl, which was caused by farmers failing to use smart ecological principles) and Upton Sinclair's The Jungle (about Chicago's meat-packing industry). Both novels reached far and wide, and are considered to be among the classics of social change novels.

Researchers have recently begun to empirically examine the influence of environmentally engaged literature on its readers. For example, scholars have found that literary fiction can make readers more concerned about animal welfare and climate change and raise awareness of environmental injustice.

== Academic groups ==
- The Association for Literature and the Environment (ASLE)
- The Association for Literature, Environment, and Culture in Canada (ALECC)
- Cambridge Ecofiction Bookgroup: An initiative of the MML and English Faculty Libraries at Cambridge University
- European Association for the Study of Literature, Culture and the Environment (EASLCE)

== Examples ==
- How Beautiful We Were, Imbolo Mbue
- The Bear, Andrew Krivak
- The Butterfly Effect, Rajat Chaudhuri
- The Devil's Highway, Gregory Norminton
- Borne, Jeff VanderMeer
- Memory of Water, Emmi Itäranta
- Bangkok Wakes to Rain, Pitchaya Sudbanthad
- Nature's Confession, JL Morin
- Rokit, Loranne Vella
- The Water Knife, Paolo Bacigalupi
- The Word for World is Forest, Ursula K. Le Guin
- Flight Behavior, Barbara Kingsolver
- American War, Omar El Akkad
- Jabujicaba, Rosa da Silva
- The Jungle, Upton Sinclair
- Oil on Water, Helon Habila
- The Monkey Wrench Gang, Edward Abbey
- Barkskins, Annie Proulx
- Float, JoeAnn Hart and My Last Continent, Midge Raymond
- The Man with the Compound Eyes, Wu Ming-yi
- Parable of the Sower, Octavia E. Butler
- The Overstory, Richard Powers
- Side Chick Nation, Aya de León
- Mars Trilogy, Kim Stanley Robinson
- The Sheep Look Up, John Brunner

== See also ==
- Ecology in fiction
- Climate change in popular culture
- Climate fiction
- Ecocriticism
- Ecological humanities
- Ecopoetry
- Nature writing
- Solarpunk
- Speculative fiction
