= The Burning World =

The Burning World or Burning World may refer to:

- The Burning World (novel), a 1964 science fiction novel
- The Burning World (album), a 1989 rock album by Swans
- "The Burning World", song/single by the band The Field Mice
