= Atmospheric super-rotation =

State where a planet's atmosphere rotates faster than the planet itself

Atmospheric super-rotation is a phenomenon where a planet's or moon's atmosphere rotates faster than the planet itself. This behavior is observed in the atmospheres of Venus, Titan, Jupiter, and Saturn. Venus exhibits the most extreme super-rotation, with its atmosphere circling the planet in four Earth days, much faster than the planet's own rotation of 243 Earth days. The phenomenon of atmospheric super-rotation can influence a planet's climate and atmospheric dynamics.

The reverse phenomenon, atmospheric sub-rotation, can also be observed in nature.

== Dynamics of super-rotation ==
Hide's Theorem, developed in 1969 by Raymond Hide, is the theoretical basis in understanding atmospheric super-rotation. The theorem states that eddies or waves must first cause disturbances in order for an atmosphere to develop super-rotation, thus making the role of atmospheric waves and instabilities crucial. These dynamics, including Rossby waves and Kelvin waves, are integral in transferring momentum and energy within atmospheres, contributing to the maintenance of super-rotation. For instance, on Venus, the interaction of thermal tides with planetary-scale Rossby waves is thought to contribute significantly to its rapid super-rotational winds. Similarly, in Earth's atmosphere, Kelvin waves generate eastward along the equator, playing a vital role in phenomena like the El Niño-Southern Oscillation, demonstrating the broader implications of these dynamics in atmospheric science.

There are three classes of super-rotating planets, each with different driving mechanisms: fast-rotating gas giants, slow-rotating terrestrial planets, and tidally locked planets. For gas giants like Jupiter and Saturn, the quick rotational period causes strong Coriolis effects in the atmosphere. This results in strong atmospheric eddies that can efficiently transport angular momentum to the atmosphere, causing super-rotation.

For slow rotating terrestrial bodies like Venus and Titan, super-rotation is often spontaneously initiated by Rossby-Kelvin (RK) instability. This instability comes interactions of equatorial Kelvin waves with high-latitude Rossby waves, causing momentum to converge at the equator and facilitate super-rotation. Thermal tides caused by uneven heating are also responsible for super-rotation on especially slow rotating planets, namely Venus. These tides have been found to enhance super-rotation near the cloud tops by providing additional momentum toward the equator.

Tidally locked planets are thought to initiate super-rotation through Matsuno-Gill patterns. These patterns arise from strong asymmetry in heating between the day and night sides of tidally locked planets, which creates the vertical transport mechanism needed to transfer momentum from stationary eddies to the equator. Matsuno-Gill patterns and RK instability are very similar mechanisms, and there had been work to unify the super-rotation mechanisms of slow-rotating planets and tidally-locked planets to create better understanding of the super-rotation in general.

== Venus ==
The atmosphere of Venus is a prominent case of extreme super-rotation; the Venusian atmosphere circles the planet in just four Earth days, much faster than Venus' sidereal day of 243 Earth days. Wind speed hits a maximum of about 100 m/s at the top of the cloud layer 60 to 70 km above the surface, rotating about 50 times faster than the surface. Zonal wind speed decreases both above and below this altitude, approaching near zero around 95 km. This wind speed makes Venus the most extreme example of super-rotation in our solar system.

The initial observations of Venus' super rotation were Earth-based. The Venera missions in the late 1960s provided the first direct evidence of super-rotation through doppler tracking of the probe's descent. Mariner 10 provided the first UV images of Venus' clouds, which enabled cloud tracking to measure the atmosphere's rotational period. The Pioneer Venus multiprobes, Venera 9 and 10 landers, and Vega 1 and 2 balloons built vertical profiles of wind speed through the 1970s and 80s. The Venus Express mission gave the first long-term monitoring of Venus' super-rotation, monitoring the cloud tops for 6 Earth years. Over the course of the mission, wind speeds increased from 300 km/h to 400 km/h, providing the first evidence that super-rotation is a changing dynamic system. The latest mission, Akatsuki, produced over 4 million cloud-tracking measurements across almost 10 years. Akatsuki data has been used to refine super-rotation mechanisms, showing that thermal tides are the primary mechanism maintaining super-rotation on Venus.

Modern general circulation models (GCM) are used to consolidate our knowledge of super-rotation and are used to simulate and test theories about the mechanisms and dynamics of super-rotation. One of the earliest mechanisms for the super-rotation of Venus was the Gierasch-Rassow-Williams (GRW) mechanism. Early GCMs were based on this mechanism, but failed to match with observation data. Including thermal forcing in the GCM models in the 2010s has led to relatively successful models in recent years, and may be realistic enough to begin data assimilation projects from the Venus Express and Akatsuki missions databases.

GCMs and observations are often enhanced by looking at past ancient climates. In a model where Venus is assumed to have an atmospheric mass similar to Earth, subsolar-antisolar circulation could have dominated over super-rotation in an ancient thinner atmosphere.

== Titan ==
Super-rotation present in the stratosphere of Titan has been inferred by Voyager IRIS, Cassini CIRIS, stellar occultation and temperature observations, and Doppler shifts of the Huygens probe’s radio signal. Latitudinal pressure gradients established from measurements taken by Voyager IRIS were sufficient to produce super-rotation of the atmosphere. Stratospheric zonal winds on Titan were observed on the order of 100-200 m s^{−1}, faster than the highest zonal winds on Earth at ~60-70 m s^{−1}. Questions on the effect of obliquity in super-rotation on Titan is often compared to Venus, as they share similar centrifugal accelerations to achieve dynamic balance. Any seasonal variations effected by obliquity between Titan and Venus is much different, as the small obliquity of Venus at 2.7° negates any strong seasonal effects. Titans obliquity at 26.7° is high enough to cause seasonal variations within the stratospheric spin. Attempts to model super-rotation on the gas giants, including Titan, has been abundant. The first observations of Titan in the 1980's revealed little information about circulation within the atmosphere due to the low contrast photochemical haze covering the moon. The first general circulation model (GCM) in the 1990s provided insight into the stratospheric properties that should be expected on Titan with further observation, and predicted super-rotation with winds up to 200 m/s. Super-rotation was supported by the first 3D Titan GCM created by the Laboratoire de Météorologie Dynamique (LMD), in which they used an atmosphere similar to the observations of Voyager and recently Cassini.

The most recent GCM that is able to simulate super-rotation in the stratosphere successfully is TitanWRF. Modeled after the PlanetWRF, which was designed to be a global weather, research, and forecasting (WRF) model, TitanWRF added planetary physics and generalized parameters to produce a successful super-rotation model. Work done with TitanWRF v2 was able to simulate gradients in latitudinal temperature, zonal wind jets and super-rotation in the stratosphere. Comparing TitanWRF v2 simulations with constant solar forcing (seasonal cycle removed) models, showed that in the latter, a rapid buildup in rotation, attaining > 100m/s, happened in a few Titan years. The parameters in these older forcing models differ greatly in the mechanisms involved in generating the initial super-rotation compared to the more realistic TitanWRF models. After initial spin up, similarities evolve between the different models when a steady state is produced, but differ again in the final states of the model. The initial mechanism producing spin up to super-rotation is still an on going question, as correlations between models differ greatly within this regime.

== Jupiter and Saturn ==
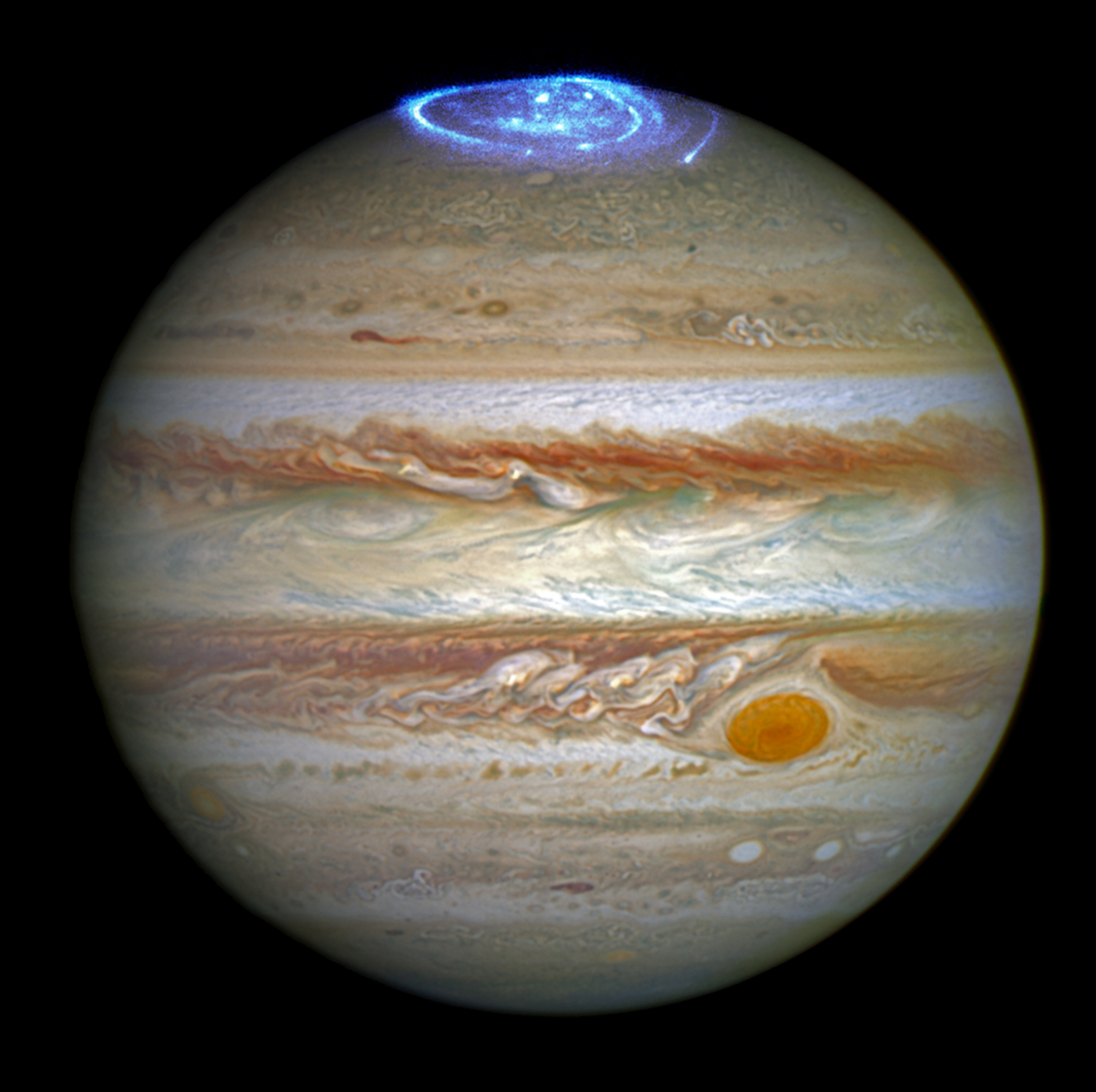
Jupiter's auroras reveal the planet's super-rotational atmospheric dynamics. With the different shades of color and depths of the clouds, the ethereal glow highlights the planet's rapid atmospheric movements.

The visible cloud tops of Jupiter and Saturn provides further evidence on its deep atmospheric circulation demonstrating the presence of atmospheric super-rotation. Jupiter's auroras, in particular, highlight the planet's rapid atmospheric movements through their ethereal glow and varying cloud depths.

On gas giants, atmospheric super-rotation manifests differently compared to slower rotating terrestrial planets. Both Jupiter and Saturn display cloud patterns known as banding that is associated with strong, alternating jet streams. These planets’ jet streams are coupled with eastward and westward zonal winds that are typically measured through spacecraft imaging, cloud tracking, or numerical circulation models. Since both Jupiter and Saturn emit more energy than they absorb from the Sun, convection is an important driver of atmospheric motion. This internal heat helps to generate turbulence, waves, and convective storms that can transfer momentum into these organized zonal jets on each gas giant. Models of Jupiter have shown that large-scale latent heating and convective processes can reproduce several of these observed features, including banded winds and equatorial super-rotation.

The upper troposphere of Jupiter is organized into alternating dark belts and light zones, each associated with strong zonal jets. Jupiter has a prograde equatorial jet that moves faster than the bulk atmospheric rotation of the planet. This qualifies the jet as an equatorial super-rotation. The winds on Jupiter are part of a stable, planet-wide circulation pattern that has been observed by cloud-tracking spacecraft. There has been theoretical work suggesting that Jupiter’s equatorial jet can be maintained by interactions between moist convection, turbulence, and large-scale waves. Numerical simulations from this work also reproduced a prograde equatorial jet and alternating off-equatorial jets, supporting the idea that atmospheric disturbances can drive equatorial super-rotation in Jupiter’s upper atmosphere.

Observations from the Cassini mission have shown that Saturn’s equatorial region contains a fast, vertically structured jet with a speed and width that vary with altitude and time. Studies utilizing the Cassini cloud-tracking measurements mapped Saturn’s zonal winds and found that the equatorial jet has a three-dimensional structure instead of behaving as a simple surface wind. Large convective storms on Saturn have also been studied, and the results have shown that the equatorial jet is time-variable and interacts with major atmospheric disturbances.

There was early uncertainty as to whether the jets on these gas giants were shallow or if they extended deep into their planets’ interiors. The gravity measurements from the Juno mission provided helpful insights into this question, especially for Jupiter. One study found that Jupiter’s asymmetric gravity field is consistent with east-west jet streams extending thousands of kilometers below the cloud tops, with characteristic depths of roughly 3,000 km. This finding meant that Jupiter’s jets were connected to a deeper atmospheric circulation than images alone would be able to suggest. As for Saturn, Cassini provided similar observations with its gravity measurements. Studies found that Saturn’s zonal winds penetrated deeper than Jupiter’s, with some models suggesting depths of approximately 9,000 km. Results from one study stated that extending Saturn’s wind profile to these depths could explain Cassini’s measured gravity harmonics, which would tie Saturn’s equatorial super-rotation to its deep convection. Observations from these missions help demonstrate that for gas giants, atmospheric super-rotation is closely related to their convection and internal structure.

== Earth ==
On Earth, the thermosphere has a slight net super-rotation, exceeding the surface rotational velocity. The size of this phenomenon varies widely across different models. Some models suggest that global warming is likely to cause an increase in super-rotation in the future, including possible change in surface winds patterns. In simplified GCM models, equatorial super-rotation emerges without obliquity and the addition of tropical heating anomalies. At present, a counter balance between the easterly Coriolis torque and the westerly torque maintains subrotation in the upper tropical troposphere. This leads to the prospect that with warmer and tropical wave sources in past ancient climates, Earth's atmosphere might have super-rotated.

== Exoplanets ==
Super-rotation in planetary atmospheres extends to the study of exoplanets, particularly hot Jupiters. These distant worlds, orbiting close to their stars, often exhibit extreme atmospheric conditions, including super-rotation, which influences their thermal structures and potential habitability. Observations from telescopes like the Hubble Space Telescope have unveiled super-rotational wind speeds of thousands of kilometers per hour on some hot Jupiters. Moreover, the phenomenon shows how hot Jupiters are tidally locked, where one side continuously faces the star. This suggests a mechanism for heat distribution in planets, a factor in understanding their climatic conditions and patterns.
