= Atmospheric sub-rotation =

Phenomenon where a planet's atmosphere rotates slower than the planet itself

Atmospheric sub-rotation or subrotation is the phenomenon where a planet's atmosphere rotates slower than the planet itself. It can be observed in the averaged motion of the Earth's troposphere and on the ice giant planets Neptune and Uranus.

The reverse phenomenon is known as atmospheric super-rotation.

== See also ==
- The Wind from Nowhere, a science fiction novel by J. G. Ballard in which the Earth's atmosphere starts to increase its subrotation speed without reason
