= Núria Perpinyà =

Spanish writer (born 1961)

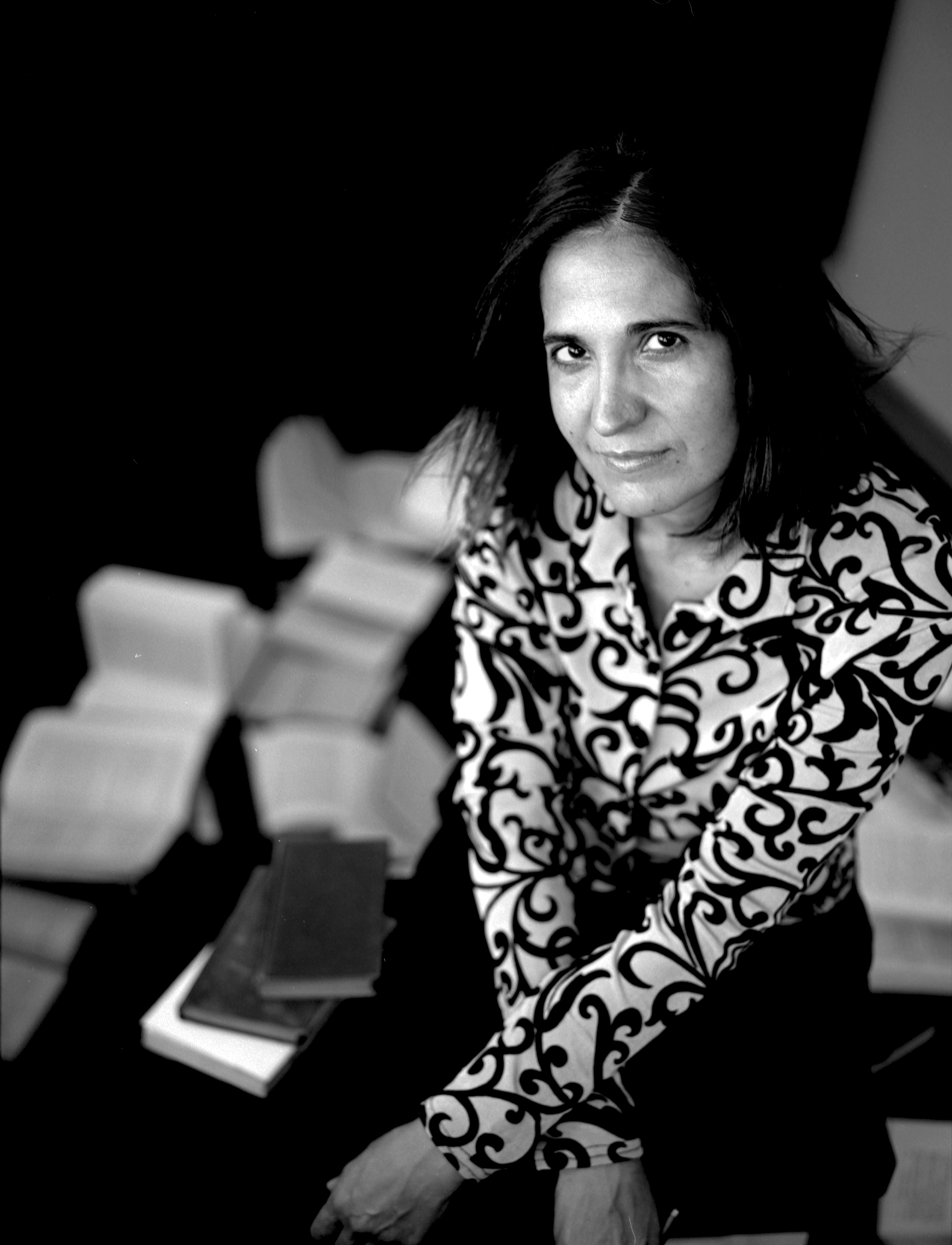
- Born: May 25, 1961; Lleida, Catalonia, Spain
- Occupations: Novelist, playwright
- Writing career
- Language: Catalan
- Genre: Mixture of genres: novel + short story + theatre
- Notable works: A House to Compose, Mistana, To the vertigo.
- Notable awards: Catalan Novel Criticism Award (2005); International Essay Award S.XXI Mexico (2010); Malaga Essay Award (2020)
- Website: www.nuriaperpinya.com

Núria Perpinyà Filella (Catalan pronunciation: [ˈnuɾiə pəɾpiˈɲa fiˈleʎə]; born 1961) is a Catalan novelist, a playwright and an essayist. Senior Lecturer in Theory and Comparative Literature at the university of Lleida in Catalonia, Spain. Her novels deal with unusual topics and are characterized by their intellectual irony, formal rigor and experimentalism. In her books, she defends the philosophy of Perspectivism and reflects on the fact that the phenomena have multiple interpretations. Her creative work is written in Catalan, but most of the essays are published in Spanish or in English.

== Biography ==
Núria Perpinyà Filella was born in Lleida, Spain, May 25, 1961 and lived in this town until she finished her degree in Catalan Studies in 1984. She moved to Cáceres, then to London, Madrid and Barcelona. Despite her changes of residence, she worked as a professor at the University of Lleida. First, she taught Catalan literature and then literary theory and comparative literature. In 1986, at the age of 25, she published her first book: an essay about a Catalan realist poet from the 1960s, Gabriel Ferrater, written in collaboration with Xavier Macià, under the title The poetry of Gabriel Ferrater. This work won the Catalan Essay Prize Josep Vallverdú. In 1989, Perpinyà received the Extraordinary Prize for her PhD thesis from the University of Barcelona for research on Ferrater. She became one of his main specialists. In 1998, she published her first novel, A Good Mistake, where was already shown "the complexity and the elaboration that will characterize the rest of her novels”. In A House to Compose (2001), Perpinyà developed a new genre halfway between a story and a novel. Mistana (2005), much more fantastic, was awarded a National Critics Prize. In The Privileged (2007), she opted, once more, for a renovation of literary genres with a dramatic novel. In the year 2010, she launched her first theatre play, The Calligraphers. After her Alpinist novel To the vertigo (2013), Perpinya publishes And, suddenly, Paradise (2018), an experimental novel on the addiction to Internet.

== Style ==
The work of Núria Perpinyà is a mixture of intellectual reflections and irony. Her style has been labelled as “a magmatic writing style”, and it has been characterized by “a control of the composition, a linguistic precision and originality of the actions”. In each of her books, Perpinyà has challenged herself with different experiments: A Good Mistake is a thriller based on readers’ false suppositions. In A House to compose, she explored a new literary genre: a “fragmented novel” which, even though belonging to a Composite Novel or Short story cycle, it provided the novelty of a chain of stories that they turned over into chapters of a novel. This fusion of genres reappeared in The Privileged where the narrative and the dramatic style cohabited side by side.

Regarding her subjects, Perpinyà has dedicated each book to a concrete topic. A Good Mistake is a love story in the world of science; A House to Compose recreates the world of music and architecture; The Privileged is about art and museums; The Calligraphers is about the university; and Mistana deals with the madness. Her novel, To the Vertigo, the most romantic and pictorial one, is another important twist in her trajectory. She substituted – at least apparently – her intellectual world for the sport. Her novel and her play on the Internet are an online collective writing experiment. These books are written as a collage of Twitter sentences.

== Novels ==
The first book of fiction by Perpinyà, Un bon error (A Good Mistake) related the life of a young man who moved to laboratory in London and fell in love with a black scientist. The protagonist, Joan Xammar, must overcome two obstacles: the one of gender and the one of race.

A House to Compose (2001), is a story about a Pianist who was looking for a flat. In this novel about music, Perpinyà “dares to weave a multi-faceted plot”, and “while the protagonist passes through different kinds of housing – a garret, a duplex, an attic – (…) there is a kind of a musical whirlwind in her head”. The book had also an unusual structure: chained stories that ended up merging into a novel. The plot was the quête of the protagonist, Olivia Kesler, who was “a misanthrope of her art and a female Odysseus”. The novel is a crossword of genres and worlds: music, architecture and literature. A House to Compose is a harsh but comical critic to the architectonic dictatorship and suggests a romantic opposition between the artist and the society. The composer Olivia Kesler did not find her creative space in a society that was architectonically hostile to her.

In the third novel by Perpinyà, Mistana (National Critics Prize 2005), the realism was abandoned and the author opted for a fantastic style. The book narrated a story about a meteorologist with mental disorders who fell into misfortune when he arrived at a phantasmal town called Mistana with an everlasting fog, inhabited by eccentric characters. An extreme climatology that evoked her home town, Lleida. The novel was “a tragedy about madness written in crescendo rhythm of delirious verses in prose” that has been labelled as “vertiginous and breathtaking” and as a “hypnotic and radical novel”. As Maria Dasca said, Mistana was “an unbridled fiction, tragic and comic at the same time” with a philosophical fog where “the things lose appearances and a man does not know who he is anymore”.

In 2013 To the Vertigo appeared, a novel about love between mountaineers. The protagonists were obsessive idealists isolated from the society. The plot revolved around love of a solitary mountain climber, Irena Besikova. The novel suggested two important discussions: the one of passion and Feminism. The epistolary style developed until it became an adventure novel that, in the last chapters, adopted an unexpected meta-literary dimension. To the Vertigo was critically acclaimed.

In 2018, Perpinyà published the experimental novel And, suddenly, Paradise on Internet Addiction Disorder. The action takes place in a psychiatric clinic. The work raises a debate about the advantages and disadvantages of the network, as well as discussing other behavioral disorders such as anorexia nervosa.

In 2022, the author enters the Science Fiction world, with a novel about Climate Change, named Diatom. The novel can be classified within the Cli-Fi genre. It is an absurdity plot about the sea that warns about the dangers of Populism and Demagogy.

In 2025, she published the fantasy novel The Invisible Body (Crítica Serra d'Or Award 2026) of the travels of an ATP enzyme inside a human body. Its microscopic adventures are full of scientific humor and recall episodes from Homer's Odyssey and James Joyce’s Ulysses.

== Poetry ==
In 2023 her first book of poetry Changing Skies appeared. It is a love story through poems in which a couple in crisis dialogue. The variations in love run parallel to atmospheric changes. The work premiered at the Sala Beckett in Barcelona on 10 May 2023.

== Plays ==
In 2007, The Privileged appeared. It is a comical dramatic novel in which the author thought about art, adopting a point of view of the guards in a Museum. The story narrated a restructuring of an old-fashioned museum into an Avant-garde museum, the sceptical attitudes of the guards towards the modern art, and the labour conflicts. The plot passed through vicissitudes of the main character, Mr. Serivà, a genuine, tragic and anti-heroic guard. The irony of the book is addressed to the ignorant audience and the art as a business and political platform. As Ponç Puigdevall said, the novel proofed the effort of the author “to discover new literary territories where the accuracy does not contradict the entertainment”.

The Calligraphers (2010) is a tragicomedy about Philosophy of Education in Arts. The plot revolved around the closure of a University Department of Ancient Calligraphy and its substitution for a new degree in criminal calligraphic studies. This modernization of the university provoked tensions between the professors and it revealed jealousy and revenges. The play was opened in Lleida, at Escorxador Theatre, December 15, 2010, under the direction of Óscar Sánchez and it was performed by Imma Colomer, Pep Planas, Núria Casado and Ferran Farré.

The Calligraphers is the staging of her essay More Than a Machine. Both books are about education.

This twinning between genres occurs again in 2018 where the same story about the internet appears in a theatrical version (The Vice) and in a novelistic version (And, suddenly, Paradise).

== Non Fiction: A Humanistic Relativism ==
Among Perpinyà's academic researches, it is worth to mention the studies on a Catalan poet of the 60s, Gabriel Ferrater, a friend of Gil de Biedma and Carlos Barral. An atypical intellectual who had an important influence on the following generations similar to Robert Graves, Robert Frost or W.H. Auden. In her study Gabriel Ferrater: Reception and Contradiction (1997), Perpinyà analyzed the myth of Ferrater and did a deconstruction of the Catalan criticism. A polemic book “dedicated to all the sceptical readers who realize that, in the literary criticism, nothing completely innocent is ever said”.

Perpinyà reappeared in 2008 with “a demythologizing essay”. The Crypts of Criticism: Twenty Readings of The Odyssey; this book offered a wide view on different schools of Literary Theory. Written in “a casual style”, this essay particularly exemplified the theory with examples: twenty different interpretations about the Greek masterpiece.

The defense of humanistic Relativism can also be observed in her novels in which a kaleidoscope of attitudes related to a particular topic often appeared. In 2010, Perpinyà won an international essay prize for 21st-century editorial of Mexico for her work More than a Machine. This epistemological essay is about knowledge and education that extended from the Age of Enlightenment to the present days, and it pleaded for a creative learning against a routine one.

In 2014, Perpinya published her essay on Romanticism: Ruins, Nostalgia and Ugliness (2014) which analyzes the Romantic interest in the Middle Ages, from the eighteenth century to the successful series Game of Thrones. Also, one of the theses of the book is considered Romantic, Ruins's pictures as a precedent of Avant-garde's Ugliness.

In 2019, appears her essay on the Catalan Avant-garde and Experimental Theatre, The Broken Chair. The book analyzes the hundred years of Catalan, Russian, European Avant-garde Theatre and Theatre of the Absurd from the beginning of twentieth century to the present. It deals with scenography, politics and dramaturgy topics.

Her book Chaos, Virus, Calm, is a scientist and humanistic study on order and chaos where chaos theory is compared to artistic, political and social chaos, with particular emphasis on the concepts of Relativism and post-truth and on the collapse of the COVID-19 pandemic.

== Bibliography ==
=== Novels ===
- 1998: A Good Mistake (Un bon error, Barcelona, Empúries)
- 2001: A House to Compose (Una casa per compondre, Barcelona, Empúries)
- 2005: Mistana (Mistana, Barcelona, Proa)
- 2007: The Privileged (Els privilegiats, Barcelona, Empúries)
- 2013: To the Vertigo (Al vertigen, Barcelona, Empúries)
- 2018: And, suddenly, Paradise (I, de sobte, el paradís. Barcelona, Comanegra)
- 2022: Diatom (Diatomea, Barcelona, La Magrana)
- 2025: The Invisible Body (El cos invisible, Barcelona, La Magrana)

=== Poetry ===
- 2023: Changing Skies (Cels canviants, Mallorca, Lleonard Muntaner)

=== Plays ===
- 2007: The Privileged (Els privilegiats, Barcelona, Empúries)
- 2011: The Calligraphers (Els Cal.lígrafs, Barcelona, Empúries)
- 2019: The Vice (El vici, Tarragona, Arola)

=== Non fiction ===
- 1986: The Poetry of Gabriel Ferrater (La poesia de Gabriel Ferrater, Barcelona, Edicions 62; with Xavier Macià)
- 1991: The Theory of Bodies, of Gabriel Ferrater (Teoria dels cossos, de Gabriel Ferrater, Barcelona, Empúries)
- 1997: Gabriel Ferrater: Reception and Contradiction (Gabriel Ferrater: recepció i contradicció, Barcelona, Empúries)
- 2008: The Crypts of Criticism: Twenty Readings of The Odyssey (Las criptas de la crítica: veinte lecturas de la Odisea, Madrid, Gredos)
- 2010: More than a Machine (Más que una máquina, Mexico, Siglo XXI)
- 2014: Ruins, Nostalgia and Ugliness. Five Romantic perceptions of the Middle Ages and a spoonful of Game of Thrones and Avant-garde oddity (Berlin, Logos Verlag).
- 2019: The Broken Chair: Avant-garde Catalan Theatre (La cadira trencada. Teatre català d'avantguarda, Tarragona, Arola)
- 2021: Caos, Virus, Calm. The Theory of Chaos applied to Artistic, Social and Political Disorder (Caos, virus, calma. La Teoría del Caos aplicada al desórden artístico, social y político, Madrid, Páginas de Espuma)
- 2023. Editor of Oh-Oh. The Exquisite Corpse of Catalan Theater (Ai-Ai. El cadàver exquisit del teatre català, Tarragona, Arola)

== Awards ==
- 1984: Catalan Essay Prize Josep Vallverdú.
- 2005: National Catalan Critics Prize.
- 2010: International Essay Prize Editorial Siglo XXI Mexico.
- 2015: Marguerite Yourcenar Writer's Residence (France).
- 2019: Art Omi New York / Writers's Residence.
- 2020: Malaga Essay Award.
- 2026: Catalan Novel Award Serra d'Or
