= Fugl (novel) =

2019 science fiction novel by Sigbjørn Skåden

Fugl (in English: Bird)
- Author: Sigbjørn Skåden
- Translators: Marina Heide (published in French as Oiseau in 2021)
- Language: Norwegian
- Subject: Space colonization, Climate fiction, Indigenous peoples, Language death
- Genre: Science fiction
- Publisher: Cappelen Damm
- Publication date: 2019
- Publication place: Norway, Sápmi
- Pages: 124
- ISBN: 9788202621452

Fugl (in English: "Bird") is a 2019 Norwegian science fiction novel by Sigbjørn Skåden, and is the first science fiction novel written by a Sámi author. Fugl tells the story of a small human colony on a distant planet where speech cannot be heard. Fugl is Skåden's first novel written in Norwegian, and has been interpreted as an allegory of the Sámi peoples' loss of their language due to forced assimilation and Norwegianization. Fugl was translated to French by Marina Heide as Oiseau in 2021.

== Plot ==
Fugl is a short, lyrical novel set in a future where a small colony of humans has settled on a distant planet they call "Sedes" or "Heim", which means home. The colony lives in a dome with limited resources, and have not had contact with other humans for many years. The story is narrated in two alternating time periods: 2048, when the first child is born on Heim, and a century later, in 2147, when a new spaceship brings the first humans to the planet after the initial colonisation.

The planet Heim has atmospheric conditions that make it impossible for humans to hear sounds. The descendants of the initial colonisers have never experienced spoken language, and communicate only in writing. They have also lost their cultural archives.

== Style ==
Fugl is a short, lyrical novel. It is only 124 pages long, and written in a "poetic style with extensive use of metaphors, comparisons and personifications of landscape" ("Stilen er poetisk med mye bruk av metaforer, sammenligninger og landskapsbesjelinger, som f.eks. 'Dalen er ei tunge'") In an otherwise rather dismissive review, Morgenbladet's reviewer describes the prose as "quiet, but clear; its descriptions of nature are sweeping but simultaneously precise and sensitive."

== Fugl and Samí culture ==
In a feature article in the Sámi newspaper Ávvir, Skåden stated that the book was an "obvious Sámi book", despite there being nothing explicitly Sámi present.

In a 2020 lecture at the University of Tromsø, Skåden said that he views Fugl as his most Sámi book. Henning Howlid Wærp cites this statement in a scholarly article analysing Fugl, noting that the claim seems paradoxical at first since there is no explicit mention of Samí people or culture in the book. However, Wærp describes how not only speech but song is taken from the small group of people on Heim. Part of the novel is written from the perspective of Heidrun, who gives birth to the first child on the new planet Heim. Her distress at not being able to share her culture with her child is painful: "I sing to you as my mother sang to me. But you cannot hear me" (p. 101) (Jeg synger til deg slik mi mor sang til meg. Men du hører det ikke.)

This loss of language and culture is a close analogy to the destruction of Sámi languages and culture through the Norwegianization policies that continued until the 1980s, and mirrors equivalent forced assimilation of indigenous cultures around the world.

As Wærp argues, the dystopia of living without nature is even harsher if we interpret the humans on Heim as a Sámi culture, because the Sámi live so close to nature.

The new human colonisers who arrive after the first group has been on Heim for a century can also be read as colonisers. Wærp cites a passage from Fugl where the newcomers optimistically say, "With your old knowledge about the planet and our new technology we can create the new human being together." ("Med deres gamle kunnskap om planeten og vår nye teknologi kan vi sammen skape det nye mennesket", page 54). When resources are insufficient, the newcomers take more than their share.

Other critics do not discuss this aspect of the novel, seeing it instead as a reflection on the impossibility of solving the climate crisis by attempting to flee Earth, or as an exploration of the relationship between humans and an indifferent or even antagonistic planet, referencing the living ocean in Stanisław Lem's novel Solaris.

== Reception ==
Fugl received good reviews. In Stavanger aftenblad it was described as dark, but gripping. The Sámi newspaper Ávvir ran a multi-page feature on the novel. Norwegian critics often missed the novel's reference to Sámi experience. Writing for Morgenbladet, Carina Elisabeth Beddari described Fugl as full of "banal dialogue" and as "more psychological than allegorical or a societal critique". Sissel Furuseth saw the novel as "primarily an existential exploration of what it means to leave a place you know you wil never return to."
