= The Drowned World =

1962 novel by J. G. Ballard

- Cover of the first edition
- Author: J. G. Ballard
- Language: English
- Genre: Science fiction
- Publisher: Victor Gollancz Ltd
- Publication date: 1962
- Publication place: United Kingdom
- Media type: Print (hardcover)
- Pages: 175
- OCLC: 556478791

The Drowned World is a 1962 science fiction novel by J. G. Ballard. It first appeared in shortened form in the January 1962 issue of the UK edition of Science Fiction Adventures and was published in book form later that year by Victor Gollancz Ltd in London; an American edition followed from Berkley Medallion. Critics have grouped The Drowned World with Ballard's early science-fiction novels as part of an "ambiguous apocalypse" sequence that also includes The Drought and The Crystal World, from the period in which he was developing the ideas he described as "inner space". Set in a future in which solar radiation has melted the polar ice caps and transformed London into a flooded tropical lagoon, the novel follows biologist Robert Kerans as he becomes increasingly drawn toward the altered environment rather than toward restoring the old social order.

Critics have often read The Drowned World as a disaster narrative that rejects conventional plots of recovery and instead emphasizes psychic transformation, ecological adaptation, and regression into deep evolutionary time; later criticism and genre reference works have also treated it as an important early work of climate fiction. (Note: Attributed to multiple references:) Contemporary reviewers including Kingsley Amis and Michael Moorcock praised its imaginative power and literary ambition, though some notices were more divided, and retrospective critics have tended to place it among Ballard's key early novels and among the central works of his catastrophe fiction. (Note: Attributed to multiple references:)

== Background and publication ==
The Drowned World first appeared in shortened form in the January 1962 issue of the UK edition of Science Fiction Adventures. It was expanded into book form later that year. The first UK edition was published in London by Victor Gollancz in 1962, and an American edition followed the same year from Berkley Medallion in New York. Ballard later said that the novel had remained continuously in print, and it has continued to appear in later editions.

The Drowned World is often grouped by critics with Ballard's early catastrophe-fiction novels, including The Drought and The Crystal World, from the period in which he was developing the ideas he described as "inner space". In "Time, Memory and Inner Space", Ballard linked the book's drowned-city imagery to memories of Shanghai and London and described it as involving a return toward a second Triassic age. In a later interview, he said that he began The Drowned World after selling The Wind from Nowhere, first conceived it in shorter form, and then expanded it into a novel. In the same interview, Ballard described his catastrophe novels less as conventional disaster stories than as narratives of psychic transformation and fulfillment.

== Plot ==
In a future transformed by prolonged solar radiation, the polar ice caps have melted and much of the Earth has become a hot, flooded tropical zone. London lies largely submerged beneath lagoons, silt, and dense vegetation, and its abandoned buildings rise above the water like the remains of a prehistoric swamp. Reptiles such as iguanas and alligators inhabit the flooded city, creating a resemblance to an earlier geological age. A scientific team remains in London to study the altered environment before withdrawing north. The expedition is administered by Colonel Riggs and includes the biologist Dr. Robert Kerans and the physician Dr. Alan Bodkin. Nearby, Beatrice Dahl, a wealthy survivor, continues to live in luxurious isolation in her partly submerged apartment building, where her rooms and private swimming-pool mark a contrast with the increasingly primitive world outside.

As temperatures rise, the remaining inhabitants begin to experience vivid recurrent dreams. Bodkin theorizes that the new climate is awakening ancient biological memories and drawing human beings back toward earlier evolutionary states. Kerans becomes increasingly withdrawn and indifferent to the routines of the expedition. His detachment deepens after Hardman, a military officer attached to the group, suddenly abandons the camp and moves south into the heat. A search party fails to recover him. Riggs eventually decides that conditions in London have become untenable and orders the expedition to return north. Kerans, Bodkin, and Beatrice choose to remain behind instead of leaving with the others.

Their isolation ends when Strangman arrives in London aboard a white paddle boat, accompanied by an armed crew and carrying supplies and salvaging equipment. Strangman is a looter rather than a scientist, interested in recovering valuables from the drowned city. He first dredges the lagoons and then undertakes a larger operation to drain parts of central London by building dikes and pumping out the water. Streets, squares, and buildings re-emerge from the mud, and Strangman treats the exposed city as a storehouse to be plundered. Kerans and Bodkin react with disgust to the sight of the drained landscape and to Strangman's attempt to reclaim it for profit.

Bodkin decides to sabotage the dikes so that the water will return, but Strangman's men capture and kill him. After Bodkin's death, Kerans becomes Strangman's principal object of attention. Strangman alternates between mock civility and open cruelty, trying to force Kerans into accepting the restored city and its values. Kerans refuses to cooperate. Strangman has him imprisoned, exposed to the sun and heat, and otherwise tortured in an effort to break his resistance. Beatrice also falls under Strangman's control and remains in the city with him, less as an ally than as part of the world he has appropriated. Kerans, weakened and feverish, is unable to challenge Strangman's power directly.

Riggs eventually returns to London on patrol and intervenes. He frees Kerans, restores a limited measure of order, and compels Strangman to release his hold over the city. The intervention, however, does not resolve the larger conflict between the survivors and the transformed environment. Kerans remains repelled by the drained city and by the attempt to reimpose the old human order on it. After Strangman departs, Kerans blows up the dikes, allowing the lagoon waters to flood the city once again. The destruction reverses Strangman's work and submerges the exposed buildings.

Rather than accompany Riggs north to safety, Kerans decides to go south toward the equatorial regions, following the same path Hardman took earlier. Beatrice declines to join him. Alone, Kerans travels deeper into the flooded jungle and increasingly severe heat. On the journey he encounters Hardman again, now nearly blind and physically ruined but still moving southward. Kerans briefly tries to help him, but Hardman continues on. Kerans follows, driven by the same impulse that had earlier separated him from the expedition and from ordinary social life.

At the end of the novel, Kerans presses onward into the burning landscapes near the equator. He moves away from the remnants of organized society and deeper into the altered world whose pull he has been unable to resist.

== Themes and analysis ==
In critical discussion, The Drowned World is often treated as a disaster novel that rejects the usual narrative of recovery and reconstruction. Rather than presenting catastrophe as a challenge to be mastered, the novel follows Robert Kerans's movement away from the scientific and administrative routines of the testing station and toward a transformed environment that renders that older technocratic order increasingly obsolete. In that line of reading, the novel's central action is less the restoration of a damaged society than a process of psychic accommodation, regression, and metamorphosis, as Kerans drifts toward adaptation to the drowned world rather than resistance to it. It has also been placed within a modern science-fiction deluge tradition, but Ballard reworks that inheritance by shifting attention away from survival and renewal and toward post-catastrophic transformation. Roger Luckhurst describes Ballard's disaster fiction as taking place "between catastrophes", in an open and ambivalent post-catastrophic space, while Christopher Daley argues that The Drowned World reworks the British disaster tradition by refusing the renewal associated with the "cozy catastrophe".

Critics have also treated the novel's transformed setting as more than a backdrop for catastrophe, reading it instead as an ecological reordering that unsettles the boundary between human life and the nonhuman world. In this line of interpretation, the novel is often read as an early climate-fiction text in which environmental collapse does not simply destroy the existing world but remakes it, drawing human beings into new biological and temporal relations that weaken stable ideas of individuality and mastery. Adrian Tait argues that Ballard's disaster fiction links ecological vulnerability to a crisis of selfhood, while Moritz Ingwersen reads the climate novels as works in which catastrophe functions as morphogenesis, re-embedding the human within inhuman ecological forces rather than separating it from them. More recent criticism pushes this further in explicitly anti-anthropocentric terms: Zlatan Filipovic reads Kerans's movement south as an embodied opening to "porous living" and nonhuman entanglement, while Ljubica Matek describes the drowned world as a "nonhuman utopia" in which technocratic and anthropocentric assumptions lose their force.

A related line of criticism reads The Drowned World through deep time, arguing that its catastrophe collapses ordinary historical scale into geological and evolutionary duration. In this reading, the novel's flooded landscapes and recurrent prehistoric imagery are not simply signs of regression but part of a temporal imagination in which human life is resituated within much older planetary processes. Peter Sands argues that Ballard's climate-apocalypse fiction links subjectivity to geological and fossil time, using the figure of the fossil to erode stable distinctions between the animate and inanimate and to push beyond ordinary human-centred history. Yutaka Okuhata develops a narrower evolutionary frame, arguing that Ballard's imagery of deep time, prehistoric animals, and crystallization can be read in relation to Ernst Haeckel's evolutionary biology.

Some criticism approaches The Drowned World in formal as well as thematic terms, linking the novel to modernist and late-modernist literary technique. Patrick A. McCarthy argues that the novel makes distinctive use of allusion and a writing approach associated with modernism, while Robert S. Lehman reads it as a late modernist work concerned with the death and afterlife of the modernist project rather than simply extending high-modernist technique. A more novel-specific formal reading is offered by Juan Varo Zafra, who examines the novel's use of mise en abyme, especially through the paintings embedded in the narrative, arguing that these reflective structures connect the text to itself, its readers, and the changing context of 1960s science fiction.

A further line of criticism reads The Drowned World through imperial and post-imperial geography, arguing that the novel retains residues of colonial adventure fiction even as it unsettles them. David Ian Paddy characterizes the novel as an "ironic colonial romance" and reads it as haunted by remnants of imperial adventure narrative rather than as a simple expression of imperial decline. More recent criticism revisits the novel's race politics and coloniality more directly. Sean Matharoo argues that ecological collapse in The Drowned World is inseparable from racialisation and colonial violence, framing the novel's shared transformation of consciousness and landscape as an "eco-racial disaster". Nicole Devarenne similarly argues that Ballard's early catastrophe fiction, including The Drowned World, needs to be read with closer attention to race, coloniality, and decolonization, rather than through critical models that leave those histories in the background.

== Reception ==
=== Contemporary reception ===
Early reviews treated The Drowned World as a serious and unusual work of science fiction, though they differed in what they most valued and in how far they thought Ballard's method succeeded. Kingsley Amis praised the novel's imaginative power and treated it as evidence that science fiction could operate at a high literary level, while Michael Moorcock placed it among the comparatively few genre novels that combined strong writing with genuine thematic and speculative ambition. Reviewing the novel in New Worlds (magazine), Leslie Flood called it one of the best science-fiction novels in years, though he also faulted some of its wordiness and aspects of its motivation and detail; a later New Worlds notice likewise described it as gripping and haunting, and as unusually metaphysical for the genre. Other responses were more divided. Kirkus Reviews admired the intensity of the prehistoric landscape and the force of Ballard's imagery, but found the novel structurally uneven, while Algis Budrys took the opposite pole, criticizing its passive central figures and rejecting the novel's irrationalist mode.

=== Retrospective reception ===
Later appraisals have tended to place The Drowned World among Ballard's key early novels and to treat it as an important statement of the catastrophe fiction with which he became associated. Writing after Ballard's death, Lev Grossman grouped the novel with his strongest early post-apocalyptic works and emphasized the strange attraction his protagonists feel toward catastrophe rather than any simple struggle against it. Will Self similarly described The Drowned World as startlingly original and presented it as part of the achievement that established Ballard's stature in postwar British fiction. In 2019, The Guardian republished Kingsley Amis's favorable 1963 Observer review, returning one of the novel's earliest major newspaper notices to a general readership more than half a century after its original publication.

== Legacy and influence ==
Later commentary has often situated The Drowned World near the beginnings of climate fiction. Jim Clarke notes that survey studies have identified Ballard's early climate dystopias as founding texts of climate fiction, and argues that Ballard's treatment of climate catastrophe is psychological and ontological as well as climatological. In genre reference writing, The Encyclopedia of Science Fiction identifies The Drowned World as a frequently cited example in science fiction about climate change and describes it as "a significant influence on the iconography of later sf climate-change scenarios"; the encyclopedia's Ballard entry likewise places the novel among his early catastrophe fiction and says it helped establish him as a major author. In more popular retrospective rankings, Time included the novel in its 2010 list of the ten best post-apocalyptic books.
