= Saci Lloyd =

British writer

Saci Lloyd (born in Manchester) is a British writer. Lloyd teaches media studies in secondary school in East London, and publishes young adult novels of dystopian near-futures. Speaking of her chosen genre, Lloyd says “The best dystopia is a lens for looking at contemporary society. I like books that get children reading, and if that means vampires and werewolves then so be it, but I think reality is a more interesting topic.” Reviewer Rebecca Onion describes Lloyd's genre as “soft apocalypse,” which “chronicle[s] societies changing as a result of a series of rolling crises, rather than in the blink of an eye, as from a nuclear blast....” Onion continues “Because they take this ‘soft’ approach, Lloyd's Carbon Diaries books are wonderful at showing the effects of climate change and scarcity on everyday life; they're also completely terrifying.”

== Works ==
- Lloyd, Saci (2009). The Carbon Diaries: 2015. Holiday House. ISBN 978-0-8234-2301-9.
- Lloyd, Saci (2010). The Carbon Diaries: 2017. Holiday House. ISBN 978-0-8234-2390-3.
- Lloyd, Saci (2011). Momentum. Hodder Children's Books. ISBN 978-1-4449-0081-1.
- Lloyd, Saci (2013). Quantum Drop. Hodder Children's Books. ISBN 978-1-4449-0082-8.
- Lloyd, Saci (2015). It's the End of the World as We Know It. Hachette Children's. ISBN 978-1-4449-1668-3.

=== The Carbon Diaries: 2015 ===
The Carbon Diaries: 2015
- Author: Saci Lloyd
- Language: English
- Genre: Science fiction drama
- Publication date: February 2009
- Publication place: United Kingdom
- Media type: Print hardback, paperback)
- Followed by: The Carbon Diaries: 2017

The Carbon Diaries: 2015 is a 2009 young adult novel written by Saci Lloyd, popular in the United Kingdom.

The book chronicles a year of the life of Laura, a sixteen-year-old student in London, as the UK imposes carbon rationing in the wake of weather-related disasters. The stresses of rationing and extreme weather tear at the social fabric of Europe and England, while Laura's family is torn apart as her father loses his job and her selfish older sister refuses to adapt. Laura just wants to live a normal life, attract the attention of the fetching and accomplished boy next door, and practice with her friends in her garage band.
