= Rajat Chaudhuri =

Indian novelist and short story writer

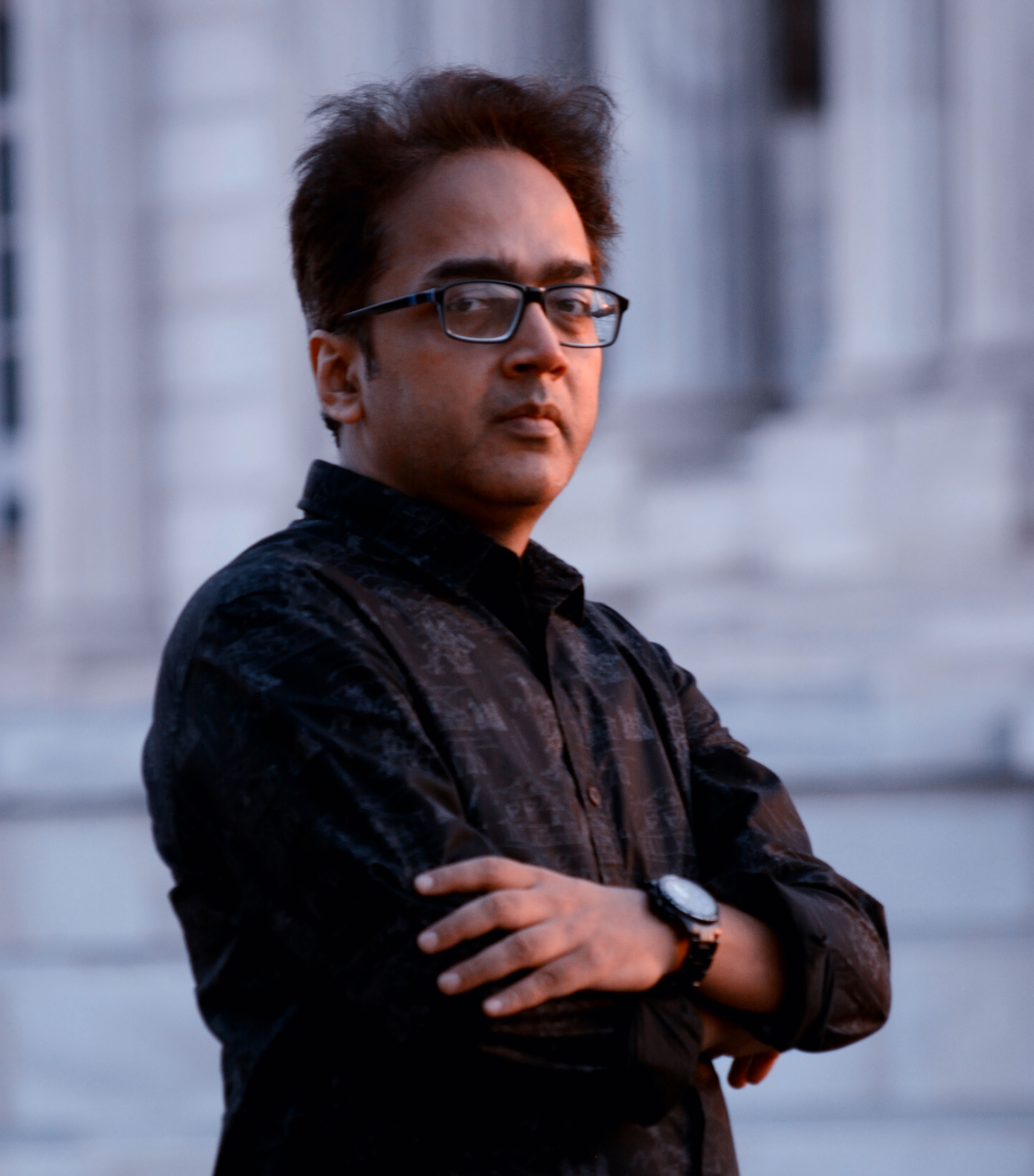
Rajat Chaudhuri Rajat Chaudhuri
- Occupations: Writer, Translator
- Writing career
- Language: English; Bengali
- Genres: Climate fiction, Post-modern fiction, Biopunk, Weird fiction
- Notable work: The Butterfly Effect, Hotel Calcutta
- Website: www.rajatchaudhuri.net

Rajat Chaudhuri is an Indian novelist and short story writer. He is the author of the critically acclaimed works Hotel Calcutta (2013), a short story cycle; The Butterfly Effect (2018), the novel Amber Dusk (2007) and other books. He is also an environment columnist, book reviewer and literary critic. His fiction blends persuasive storytelling with experiments in genre, structure, form while addressing themes like climate change, biotechnology, urbanism, and genetic engineering. His fiction has been featured in the climate change video game Survive the Century.

== Early life and education ==
Rajat Chaudhuri grew up and lives in Kolkata. He attended school at Ramakrishna Mission Vidyalaya and studied Economics at University of Calcutta.

== Career ==
He is a bilingual writer writing in English and Bengali. His books include the novel Amber Dusk (2007), the short story cycle Hotel Calcutta (2013), and Calculus (2014), a collection of Bengali short stories.

He is the Charles Wallace Creative Writing Fellow (2014) of the University of Chichester, United Kingdom, Hawthornden Castle Fellow, Scotland, United Kingdom, and a past of Fellow of Sangam House International Writers' Residency (2010), India. He is a Korean Arts Council-InKo sponsored resident writer (2013) of Toji Cultural Centre, which was set up by acclaimed Korean novelist Park Kyung-ni.

His fiction, criticism and essays have appeared in publications including Indian Literature (Sahitya Akademi), Asian Review of Books (Hong Kong), American Book Review (University of Houston-Victoria), Thresholds (University of Chichester), Eclectica, Outlook magazine and GalaxiesSF (French).

Chaudhuri has been involved with environment and development related activism and has contributed to the United Nations Development Programme's Human Development Report. He lobbies for and supports environment related causes.

He has worked for and nurtured development, environment and consumer rights groups, and has spoken about environment and sustainable consumption issues in venues within and outside the country. He has published books, monographs and papers on such topics as the right to water, sustainable food futures, sustainable consumption, and green advertisements.

Chaudhuri has also served as the developing country (Southern) coordinator on the United Nations Commission on Sustainable Development (UNCSD) NGO caucus for climate change and energy. He has appeared in environment, science fiction and international cultural meetings and communication fora like Escape Velocity organised by Museum of Science Fiction in Washington D.C., International Communication Association (ICA) events and other places speaking about biotechnology in fiction, sustainability narratives and allied issues while doing readings from his books. Chaudhuri has lectured and spoken to different audiences on the role of literature and storytelling in understanding and engaging with the climate crisis in programmes of the University of Oxford, Open University (UK) and University of London (School of Advanced Study).

=== Spellcasters ===
A desert town and two Indian metropolises is the setting for a high-stakes game of intrigue, deception and mind-control where a journalist named Chanchal Mitra is caught in the duel of powerful forces. As the novel progresses, a mysterious woman with eyes dark as murder, a billionaire industry captain, a crutch-clutching ex-sailor, and extreme climate change events come into play. Described as a climate adventure while acknowledging its debt to works on psychedelic drugs and occult traditions, the book according to public interviews by the author engages with consumer culture, mental disorders and the secret forces battling for control of minds. Spellcasters has been described as 'part psychological-thriller and part climate fiction'. The book has been described by Amitav Ghosh as 'A phantasmagoric journey through an alternative reality of collapsed time, hallucinatory visions and spectral visitations...'

==== The Climate Crossroads: Literature's Encounter with a Planet on Fire ====
A narrative non-fiction work of literary and cultural criticism examining the relationship between literature, climate change, environmental activism, and philosophical thought. Combining memoir, autoethography, literary analysis, history, and environmental humanities, the book reflects on the author's experiences as a writer of climate fiction and environmental activist while exploring how storytelling shapes public understanding of ecological crisis. Drawing connections between subjects like protest actions targeting artworks such as Vincent van Gogh's "Sunflowers", myths from the Sundarbans, Chinese weather records, and contemporary farmers' movements in India, often using the lens of fiction, the book situates climate literature within broader political and cultural debates about justice, aesthetics and planetary crisis. It studies selected climate novels through popular as well as novel theoretical frameworks including Kantian ethics, Russian formalism and the Freudian uncanny, analysing how literature provides imaginative and emotional tools for confronting the realities of planetary change and environmental catastrophe.

=== The Butterfly Effect ===
At the centre of a near-future, post-apocalyptic Darkland is the chaotic city of Calcutta. Here Captain Old, a retired policeman who is also a hired assassin receives news that could help unravel the roots of a scourge that has devastated the continent. But problems begin to pile up for him till his own life is at stake. In another narrative we find a group of Indian tourists disappearing in Korea and a detective arriving in Seoul to investigate. But soon the private eye is overwhelmed by incidents that is far beyond his ken as a crime investigator.

Meanwhile in England there is a hotshot geneticist working away on a secret project which he believes could change the world. Each of these distinct but interconnected narratives, arranged in a Russian doll structure, mingle with each other as we near the resolution of this work of speculative fiction which balances science, spirituality and a gentle way of life. This novel has been compared to Philip K. Dick's Blade Runner (based on Dick's 1968 novel Do Androids Dream of Electric Sheep?) for its dystopian settings. This book has been listed by Book Riot community as one of "50 must-read novels about eco-disaster".

The Butterfly Effect is a novel about the effect of intertwined disasters. In an interview to researcher and author Sami Ahmad Khan published in the book Star Warriors of the Modern Raj-Materiality, Mythology and Technology of Indian Science Fiction (University of Wales Press) Chaudhuri, speaking about genetic engineering has said, 'A GM mediated disaster could quickly go out of hand especially if it happens in the backdrop of major natural catastrophes (climate related) or say war...'

=== Wonder Tales for a Warming Planet ===
Wonder Tales for a Warming Planet is a 2025 collection of climate fiction short stories aimed at young readers as well as adults. The stories, accompanied by black and white illustrations by Isha Nagar, explore the multifaceted challenges and extraordinary threats of climate change through the experiences of ordinary child protagonists as well as other non-human beings. The themes and issues covered in these stories include the quest for renewable energy, growing urbanisation, rewilding, problems of geo-engineering and solarpunk futures among others. The stories in this collection incorporate playful world-building and mix genres like climate fiction, fantasy and science fiction. Each setting of the story serves as a vehicle for subtle allegories concerning the escalating perils of climate change. A central thematic objective is to encourage budding readers to consider their personal impact on the environment and recognize the transformative potential of collective action. The book incorporates learning notes and a number of suggestions for classroom activities to engage young audiences with climate action. This collection has been described by the Pioneer newspaper as, 'Perfect for classrooms, bedtime reading, or discussions about climate change, this book is an essential read for young minds ready to dream, question, and act.’

The Indian Express in its review of the book noted, 'Even as many parents see education solely as a tool to get employment, we are slowly realising that it is equally important to create responsible human beings. The book is an attempt in the same direction, conveying genuine concerns in a way best suited for young readers.'

=== Solarpunk Creatures ===
A co-edited anthology of solarpunk stories that centre non-humans like trees, robots, mycelium, deserts, comets, artificial intelligence, cats, bees and rabbits. The book is edited by Christoph Rupprecht, Deborah Cleland, Rajat Chaudhuri, Sarena Ulibarri, Melissa Ingaruca Moreno, Norie Tamura, and introduced by Christoph Rupprecht, Deborah Cleland, Rajat Chaudhuri, Melissa Ingaruca Moreno and Norie Tamura The authors and writer collectives whose stories are included here are N. R. M. Roshak, Kai Holmwood, Sandra Ulbrich Almazan, Andrew Knighton, Ana Sun, Lauren C. Teffeau, Center For Militant Futurology, Justine Norton-Kertson, Lyndsey Croal, Commando Jugendstil and Tales from the EV Studio, Geraldine Briony Hunt, Calliope Papas, Priya Sarukkai Chabria, Rodrigo Culagovski, BrightFlame, Catherine Yeates, Rimi B. Chatterjee, A.E. Marling, Jerri Jerreat and Tashan Mehta. This anthology features artwork by Yen Shu Liao, Pamina Stewart, Badlungs Art, Irina Tall, ZiitaMdot and Paul Summerfield. The acclaimed science fiction writer Samit Basu has described the book as "A dazzling array of polyphonic voices building lives new, strange and infinitely wonderful. I strongly recommend inviting them all into your brain." Lillian Zenzi writing for LibraryThing has said the book is 'A relatively quick, enjoyable, and optimistic read'.

=== Multispecies Cities: Solarpunk Urban Futures ===
A co-edited collection of short stories with multispecies and solarpunk themes. The editors who also contributed to the book's introduction are Christoph Ruprecht, Deborah Cleland, Norie Tamura, Rajat Chaudhuri and Sarena Ulibarri. This anthology of short stories addresses multispecies justice and Solarpunk futures in urban settings of Asia-Pacific and beyond. This book has stories by Priya Sarukkai Chabria, N. R. M. Roshak, Meyari McFarland, Kate V. Bui, Avital Balwit, D.A. Xiaolin Spires, Timothy Yam, Joyce Chng, Caroline M. Yoachim, Vlad-Andrei Cucu, Joseph F. Nacino, Natsumi Tanaka, Phoebe Wagner, Eliza Victoria, Taiyo Fujii, Sarah E. Stevens, Joel R Hunt, Rimi B. Chatterjee, Andrew Dana Hudson, Amin Chehelnabi, Octavia Cade, E.H. Nießler, Shweta Taneja and D.K. Mok. The book is on Grist magazine's 'The Definitive Climate Fiction Reading List'. The book is a finalist, shortlisted for the Utopia Awards.

=== Calcutta Nights ===
Translated work of narrative nonfiction originally written in Bengali (titled Raater Kolkata) by author Hemendra Kumar Roy in the year 1923. Translated into English by Rajat Chaudhuri, Calcutta Nights is the real-life account of the night-time wanderings of author Hemendra Kumar Roy in the forbidden, dangerous and exciting places of the city of Calcutta. The chapters in the book cover the brothels of Calcutta's red-light district, the dens of hoodlums, the crematoriums, night-time theatres, beggars hovels, festive streets, the 'white town' area of Esplanade, hotels among others. The book according to reports 'reveals Calcutta's best kept secrets' and acts like a 'guidebook to the dark dens of eeriness' of the city of Calcutta. The South China Morning Post in its review, described this book as 'a 1920s tour through the seedy nightlife of Calcutta in this tale of beauty and decadence'.

=== Hotel Calcutta ===
An old Calcutta hotel is under the threat of demolition from land sharks who want to replace it with a shopping mall. At this time a monk appears and prophesies that the hotel can be saved if people tell stories within its four walls every day. Thus begins a chain of storytelling by guests and hotel staff which brings together realistic and speculative storytelling traditions. The frame story of the hotel's possible demolition flows parallelly till in the final pages there is an unexpected resolution. This book has been mentioned by critics for its evocative descriptions and the magic of storytelling. The book has been noted for its visceral urbanism by academics and critics.

=== Amber Dusk ===
Amber Dusk is a cross-cultural novel set in Calcutta and Paris amidst the rapid economic changes of a newly liberalised India. The young Rishi, in love with the French photographer Valence, travels west for work. Meanwhile, his friend, the hardnosed Pedro Braganza, looking for the good life, is taking too many chances in Calcutta.

While in Paris, Rishi gets drawn into a vortex of racism and sporadic violence unleashed on the city by a little known neo-Nazi white supremacist outfit. Pedro has been putting in place his get-rich-quick plans and the initial success goes to his head. Then something happens which puts the two friends on a collision course against each other. It will be difficult for both of them to come out of it unscathed.

The novel was welcomed by critics for exploring surrealistic themes and for its handling of cross-cultural themes.

=== The Best Asian Speculative Fiction ===
An edited anthology of speculative stories from all over Asia selected, edited and introduced by Rajat Chaudhuri, the book covers science fiction, fantasy, horror, weird and other sub-genres of speculative fiction from authors in more than a dozen Asian countries.

The book has been described as "one of the most comprehensive speculative fiction collection from the continent." The critic for The Telegraph describes this book of stories as being at "the brink of a strange new world" and as a "necessary and successful conglomerate." The literary commentator Agnes S. K. Yeow writing in Southeast Asian Review of English (SARE) has described the book as 'An important contribution to an ever-expanding and dynamic literary form'.

=== The Great Bengali Poetry Underground ===
An anthology of one hundred poems selected, introduced and translated from the original Bengali by Rajat Chaudhuri. The ten poets included in the volume are from India and Bangladesh. This collection brings together poetry which has not been well-represented in the mainstream literature of Bengali and the work of these poets is "rarely available in other languages".

The focus of the anthology is on poets who often publish in the so-called 'little magazines' both in print and online. The poems of this anthology are from the underground poetry movements of the Bengali language covering a selection of poets who are currently active. Among the poets included are Pratyush Bandopadhyay, Arpan Chakrabarty, Mitul Dutta, Novera Hossain, Tanmay Mridha, Agni Roy and others. According to a critic "this galaxy of underground poets of Bengal emerge from this book as truth-tellers and myth-busters".

=== Calculus ===
Calculus is a collection of short fiction written in Bengali. Set in the city of Calcutta and its outskirts these stories bring together characters like autorickshaw drivers who speak a dead language, tantric practitioners with secret agendas, occult detectives and more which finally portray hidden facets of the city and its people.

Critics have described the stories as postmodernist and magical, with one critic saying the book "transports us to a symbolic plane of existence, perched between the possible and the impossible."

== Fellowships and awards ==
- Hawthornden Fellow, Scotland, UK, 2015
- Charles Wallace Creative Writing Fellow at University of Chichester, United Kingdom, 2014
- Arts Council Korea and InKo Fellow at Toji Cultural Centre, South Korea, 2013 (Writer-in-Residence)
- Sangam House Fellow 2010 at Nrityagram, Bangalore, India

== Bibliography ==
- Spellcasters (2023) ISBN 978-9391125882
- The Climate Crossroads: Literature's Encounter with a Planet on Fire (2026) ISBN 978-93-6952-030-5
- Calcutta Nights (2020) ISBN 9789389136456
- The Butterfly Effect (2018) ISBN 9789386906526
- Wonder Tales for a Warming Planet (2025) ISBN 978-8119626588
- The Best Asian Speculative Fiction (Edited) (2018) ISBN 9789811185281
- The Great Bengali Poetry Underground (Translated) (2021) ISBN 9789811494963
- Amber Dusk (2007) ISBN 978-8184430080
- Hotel Calcutta (2013) ISBN 9789381523735
- Calculus (2013) ISBN 9789384002039
- Water – What are our Rights to it? ISBN 8187222158
- Green Advertisements – Are they Telling the Truth (co-author) ISBN 8187222425

== See also ==
- List of Indian writers
