= Sigbjørn Skåden =

Norwegian poet and novelist

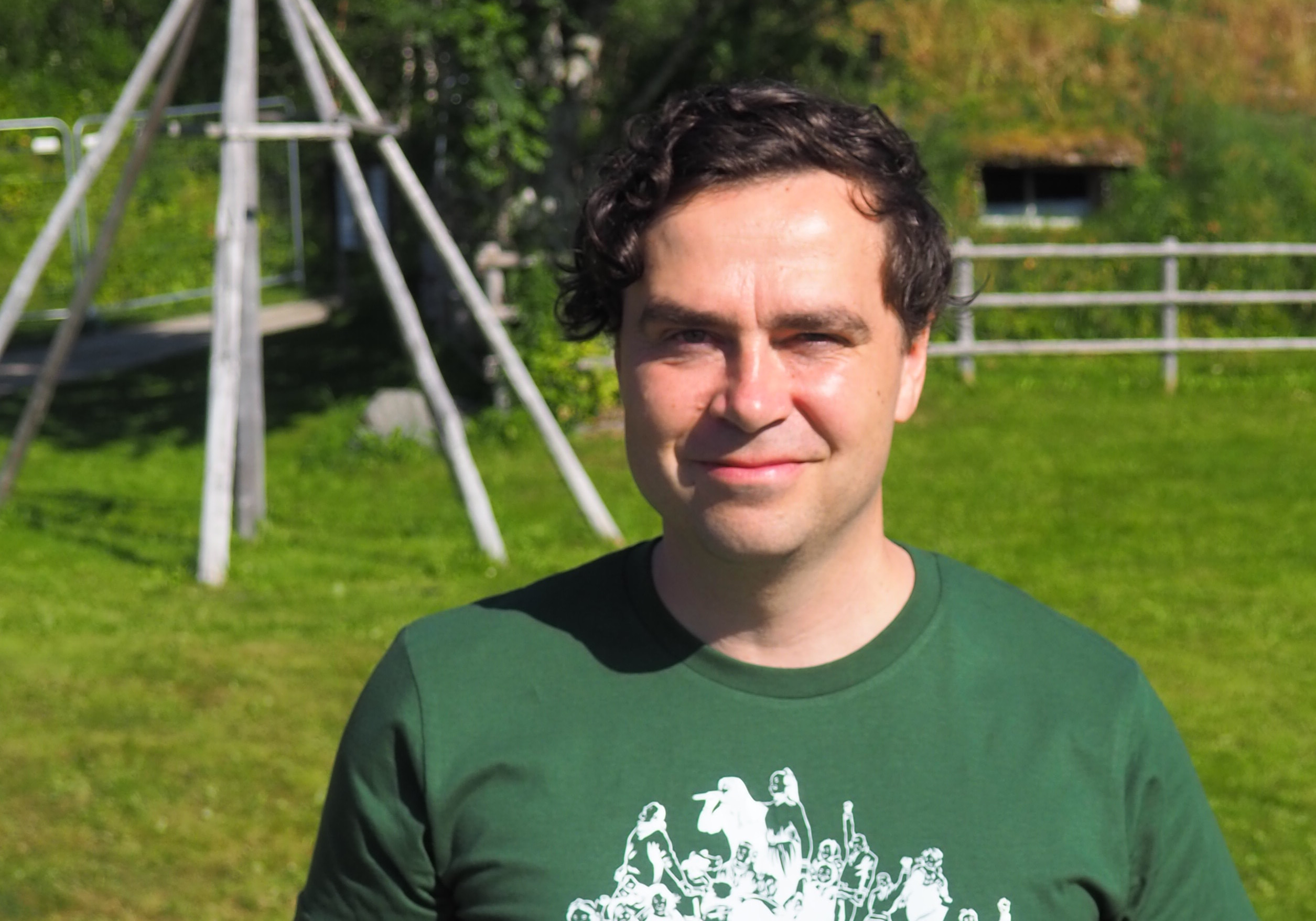
Sigbjørn Skåden in 2019

Sigbjørn Skåden (born 8 July 1976) is a Sámi and Norwegian poet and novelist.

== Career ==
Skåden published five books on the Sami publishing house Skániid Girjie; the poetry collections Skuovvadeddjiid gonagas (2004), Skomakernes konge (2007) and Prekariáhta lávlla (2009); and the novel Ihpil: Láhppon mánáid bestejeaddji (2008). For his debut, he was nominated to the Nordic Council Literature Prize, representing the Sami language area.

In 2012 he published the young adult non-fiction Sámit/Samer on Cappelen Damm. His next novel, Våke over dem som sover ("Watch over those who sleep"), was published in 2014, and was nominated for the NRK P2 Listeners' Prize and won the 2014 Havmann Prize. The novel tells the story of a Sami artist who goes to a party where he sees a high school teacher with his young students sitting on his lap. Contemporary issues of possible sexual abuse and poverty in Northern Norway are tied together with Sami history.

Skåden's 2019 novel Fugl (meaning "Bird") has been called the first science fiction novel by a Sámi author. Skåden himself has described it as his most Sámi work so far, and it has been interpreted as an allegory of the loss of Sámi culture due to forced assimilation and Norwegianization of the Sámi people.

His 2025 novel Planterhaug or Láŋtdievvá was simultaneously published in both Norwegian and Sami, both written by Skåden. It was nominated for the 2025 Brage Prize, the 2026 Nordic Council Literature Prize (as both a Norwegian and a Sámi-language entry), and the 2026 Havmann Prize.

== Personal life ==
Hailing from Planterhaug in Skånland Municipality, he resides in Tromsø.
