= The Wind from Nowhere =

1961 novel by J. G. Ballard

The Wind From Nowhere
- Cover of the first edition
- Author: J. G. Ballard
- Language: English
- Genre: Science fiction
- Publisher: Berkley Books
- Publication date: 1962
- Publication place: United Kingdom
- Media type: Print (hardback and paperback)

The Wind from Nowhere is a science fiction novel by English author J. G. Ballard. Published in 1962, it was his debut novel. He had previously published only short stories.

The novel was the first of a series of Ballard novels dealing with scenarios of natural disaster. Here, civilization is reduced to ruins by prolonged worldwide hurricane-force winds.

As an added dimension, Ballard explores the ways in which disaster and tragedy can bond people together in ways that no normal experiences ever could. That is another recurring theme in his works and makes one of its first appearances here. Some critics have suggested that his first four novels are based on elemental themes, showing global destruction by air, water, fire and earth.

Ballard later dismissed the novel, written in ten days, as a "piece of hackwork", referring instead to The Drowned World as his first real novel.

== Plot summary ==
A wind blows worldwide: it is constantly westward and strongest at the equator. The wind is gradually increasing, and at the beginning of the story, the force of the wind is making air travel impossible. Later, people are living in tunnels and basements, unable to go above ground. Near the end, "The air stream carried with it enormous quantities of water vapour — in some cases the contents of entire seas, such as the Caspian and the Great Lakes, which had been drained dry, their beds plainly visible."

In London, to cope with the situation, special organizations are set up. The Central Operations Executive (COE), staffed mainly by War Office personnel, has been set up by Simon Marshall.

Combined Rescue Operations deal with collapsing buildings. Donald Maitland, a doctor unable to travel to a new job in Canada because of the wind, is part of it. Maitland rescues Marshall when he is injured by falling masonry and takes him home to recover. In the basement of Marshall's home, Maitland sees military equipment labelled "Hardoon Tower" and wonders whose interests Marshall is really serving.

Hardoon Tower is a pyramid-like structure intended to withstand the wind; it is being built by Hardoon, a millionaire businessman, who has a private army.

Maitland's relationship with his wife Susan is ending, but when he hears that she is still in their apartment on an upper floor, while most people are underground, he goes there. Susan will not be persuaded to leave, and standing by an open window, she is carried away by the wind.

As the destruction increases in London, COE decides to abandon its underground base. One of Hardoon's officers, a helmeted, taciturn figure called Kroll, arrives. Marshall thinks he is there to take him to Hardoon Tower, but Kroll kills him.

Maitland is evacuated from the underground base along with Steve Lanyon, an American submarine captain, and Patricia Olsen, a journalist. Lanyon and Olsen have developed a relationship during recent experiences in Italy. They are in a group that leaves in a giant armoured vehicle with a periscope. Maitland, realizing they are passing close to Hardoon Tower and wanting to investigate it, sabotages the navigation equipment so that the vehicle goes to the tower, which they can locate by a radio signal.

Hardoon receives the group to his complex so that Olsen and another journalist can report his success in withstanding the wind. With winds now over 550 mph the ground underneath the complex begins eroding into a giant ravine. The group flee to the pyramid for safety, however it too starts to sag into the ravine below. Hardoon, gazing at the wind through a special window, refuses to leave the pyramid as it is collapsing. Maitland and the others escape from the pyramid as it finally falls and try to retreat to the bunkers below, but are trapped on a ledge. They contemplate jumping into the ravine below in a desperate attempt to escape the wind, but stop as they realize that the wind is starting to subside.

== See also ==
- Atmospheric sub-rotation, a real-world phenomenon where the atmosphere of some planets rotates slower than the planet itself
