= The Crystal World =

1966 novel by J. G. Ballard

- Cover of first edition.
- Author: J. G. Ballard
- Cover artist: Max Ernst
- Language: English
- Genre: Science fiction
- Publisher: Jonathan Cape
- Publication date: 1966
- Publication place: United Kingdom
- Pages: 221
- Preceded by: The Drought
- Followed by: The Atrocity Exhibition

The Crystal World is a 1966 novel by British writer J. G. Ballard. It was first published in serialized form under the title "The Equinox" in New Worlds in 1964, before appearing in hardcover from Jonathan Cape in the United Kingdom and Farrar, Straus and Giroux in the United States in 1966. Contemporary reviewers including Brian Aldiss and Judith Merril discussed the novel as a distinctive entry in Ballard’s early catastrophe fiction.

== Background and publication ==
The novel first appeared in 1964 as a two-part serialization under the title "The Equinox" in New Worlds. It was published in hardcover at 221 pages in 1966, with the first UK edition issued by Jonathan Cape (London) and the first US edition by Farrar, Straus and Giroux (New York). Paperback editions followed in the United States and the United Kingdom in the late 1960s, and later reprints have continued to appear, including a trade paperback edition issued by Farrar, Straus and Giroux in 1988.

The first UK hardcover’s cover is associated with art credited to Max Ernst. Design critic Rick Poynor reports that Ballard said he pressed Jonathan Cape to use Ernst’s painting L’oeil du silence (The Eye of Silence, 1943–44) on the hardback cover.

== Plot ==
Dr. Edward Sanders, an English physician working at a leprosy hospital, arrives by river steamer at the port town of Port Matarre in Cameroon after receiving a summons connected to Dr. Max Clair and Clair’s wife, Suzanne, who run a clinic near Mont Royal in the interior. In Port Matarre, Sanders hears reports that a strange crystallization is spreading through the surrounding forest, transforming vegetation, animals, buildings, and people into rigid, glittering forms. With routes disrupted and the interior increasingly restricted by military controls and panic, Sanders struggles to arrange transport upriver.

In the town he meets Father Balthus, a Catholic priest returning to his parish, and Ventress, a Belgian architect whose manner shifts between charm and hostility. Ventress presses Sanders about a pistol that has been smuggled ashore with Sanders’s luggage, and implies that Sanders is being watched or targeted. Sanders also encounters Louise Peret, a French journalist. Unable to secure ordinary passage to Mont Royal, Sanders and Louise hire a boat and travel upriver toward the reported affected zone.

Along the river approaches, Sanders witnesses evidence of the phenomenon, including crystalline growths on a corpse in the water. He learns that the crystallization advances in irregular surges rather than along a stable boundary. Soldiers and officials warn that the forest is dangerous not only because it immobilizes what it touches but because it appears to preserve life in a suspended state. Despite diversions and delays, Sanders continues toward the Clairs’ clinic.

With military assistance, Sanders reaches the deserted town of Mont Royal, now hemmed in by forest that has become a luminous lattice of crystal. The transformed landscape is both beautiful and threatening: trees glitter like rigid icons and animals appear frozen into jeweled postures. Sanders is attacked by a sluggish, crystal-encrusted crocodile and narrowly escapes.

Sanders’s journey becomes entangled in a feud between Ventress and Thorensen, the director of a local diamond mine. The attempt on Ventress’s life is linked to Thorensen’s men, and Sanders is repeatedly used as a decoy or pawn as the rivalry plays out in and around the crystallizing forest. Sanders later encounters Captain Radek, a military doctor he has known, now crystallized and fused into the forest’s outgrowths. Hoping moving water might reverse the process, Sanders frees Radek from the accretions and lowers the body into the river current, which provokes a horrified reaction from Ventress.

At Thorensen’s base Sanders meets Serena, Ventress’s wife, who is gravely ill with tuberculosis. Thorensen claims he is protecting her from Ventress’s instability. He offers Sanders guides to the Clairs’ clinic, but they desert Sanders in the forest. Sanders presses on alone, moving through pockets of normal terrain and corridors of crystallized growth that harden unpredictably.

Sanders eventually reaches the leprosy clinic run by Max and Suzanne Clair. The clinic offers temporary safety and a return to routine, but it lies under the forest’s shadow and those around it behave as if drawn toward the crystallization. Louise arrives but chooses to return downriver. Sanders resumes an intimacy with Suzanne, his former lover, and notices she shows early signs of leprosy. Suzanne grows increasingly detached from ordinary fears and speaks as if the crystal forest offers a kind of resolution.

Suzanne leaves the clinic and heads toward the forest. Sanders follows her and, exhausted, wakes to find his right arm covered in crystalline spurs. Ventress reappears and forces Sanders to keep moving, insisting that motion delays the crystallization’s spread. The two make their way back toward Thorensen’s summer house, where violence flares again between Thorensen’s men and Ventress. In the chaos, Sanders kills an attacker concealed beneath a crust of crystal and Ventress remains behind to confront Thorensen, urging Sanders to flee.

Sanders reaches Father Balthus’s church at the forest’s edge, where an enormous jewel-encrusted crucifix stands inside. When Sanders holds his crystallized arm near it, the crystal dissolves and his arm is freed. He stays briefly with Balthus as the crystals begin to invade the church. Balthus forces the crucifix into Sanders’s hands and sends him away, remaining behind as the forest closes in.

Using the crucifix and scattered jewels to melt or delay crystal growth, Sanders continues through the region. He encounters a trance-like procession of lepers led by a tall hooded figure revealed to be Suzanne. Sanders returns to Thorensen’s summer house, now fully immured in crystal, and finds Thorensen dead and Serena preserved beside him within her shell. Ventress runs past the building, shedding fragments of crystal and crying Serena’s name.

Sanders reaches the military perimeter and is seized by troops who accuse him of looting the jeweled crucifix, but Max Clair and Louise intervene to secure his release. Two months later Sanders is back in Port Matarre, physically recovered but unable to resume ordinary life. He settles his affairs at the port, arranges passage upriver, and returns toward the crystallizing interior.

== Themes and analysis ==
Critics have often framed The Crystal World as a "transformation story," presenting catastrophe less as destruction than as transfiguration or metamorphosis. Rob Freeman argues that cause and effect is not straightforward in Ballard’s fiction, and characterizes the novel as an "anti-journey," populated with "slowed-down people and petrified animals." In an ecocritical comparison of Ballard’s catastrophe novels, Moritz Ingwersen frames The Crystal World as a "morphogenetic" catastrophe that transforms reality rather than destroys it, and describes an "aesthetics of arrest" that resists narrative progress.

Reviewers and scholars have also emphasized the novel’s connections between inner experience and external landscape. Aldiss describes Ballard as interested in how the external world reflects the internal one, calling the crystallizing forest a "brilliant invention" explored "with a persistence that is more poetic than scientific." Merril argues that Ballard’s works "build" on one another and describes The Crystal World as the "bridge and climax" in a thematic trilogy with The Drowned World and The Drought.

Nick Perry and Roy Wilkie interpret the novel’s character system as organized through thematic "pairings," reading Sanders and Ventress as linked counterparts and extending the pattern to other relationships in the narrative. They characterize Sanders as a social pariah in the line of Ballard protagonists, and argue that Ventress functions as a more sympathetic psychological study than earlier Ballardian villains. Perry and Wilkie describe Father Balthus as "a priest attracted by heresy," and suggest that his institutional role becomes incompatible with renewed faith. They also interpret Captain Radek as representing a bureaucratic reliance on science that fails to address the event’s metaphysical implications, and note that technologies of mobility are repeatedly shown as immobilized or defeated by the encroaching crystal world.

Perry and Wilkie characterize the crystallization as an "ecumenical" symbol touching multiple personal and historical biographies, and interpret it in salvific terms, with remaining outside corresponding to a preference for "sin and evil." They note the novel’s link between the "silver scales" of leprosy and crystalline outgrowths, characterize the book as permeated by "metaphysical pessimism," and propose parallels to Percy Bysshe Shelley’s Adonais, including absorption into an "immutable One Spirit."

Recent scholarship has reoriented interpretation toward colonial and posthuman questions. Nicole Devarenne examines Ballard’s early catastrophe fiction through decolonial theory and argues that the novel’s "jungle" is shaped by imperial narratives of exoticism and stasis; she critiques earlier critical framings for omitting colonial geographies and reframes the motif of arrested time in relation to the imperial archive and its disruption. Priscilla Jolly argues that the novel thematizes indeterminacy between human and mineral forms and reads crystallization as a metaphor for the dissolution of stable identity. Barbara Klonowska advances a posthumanist utopian reading, defining crystallization as a "harmonious reordering" of biological life and positioning the novel against anthropocentric narratives of survival. Aidan Tynan proposes affinities between Ballard’s crystalline transformations and a biophilosophy of inhuman materiality, suggesting that crystallization suspends time and entropy in an aesthetic state and dissolves distinctions between human, mineral, and landscape. Cenk Tan argues that the novel critiques anthropocentrism through a metaphysical landscape indifferent to human survival and reads crystallization as prompting an ethical revaluation of ecological relations.

Contemporary debate about Ballard and New Wave science fiction shows how divisive this approach could appear in the 1960s. In a polemical essay, Yogi Borel summarizes and quotes critic John Jeremy Pierce’s hostile characterization of Ballard, including Pierce’s use of The Crystal World as an example, and then argues that Pierce’s objections are incomplete, contending that the novel presents immobility as an inevitable end-state rather than as a goal pursued by any character. In the same discussion, Borel frames Ballard’s catastrophe fiction within a Symbolist tradition emphasizing "correspondences" between external environments and internal states.

== Reception ==
On its release, The Crystal World drew attention in both mainstream and genre venues. In the United Kingdom, Aldiss called it Ballard’s "strongest and most individual novel" to date, describing it as carefully written and characterizing its treatment of the crystallizing forest as "more poetic than scientific," including an image of the crystals as "supersaturated time." In the United States, a New York Times "Reader’s Report" described Ballard as "one of the most elegant of dark fantasists" and characterized the novel as a "haunting shocker" set in the "iridescent jungles of Matarre in the Cameroons," emphasizing its imagery and the sense that "space and time are coalescing." Writing in The Magazine of Fantasy and Science Fiction, Merril argued that Ballard’s work demanded forms of criticism not yet fully developed, described The Crystal World as a "bridge and climax" in a thematic trio with The Drowned World and The Drought, and judged it the strongest of the three.

Later appraisals frequently singled the novel out within Ballard’s early catastrophe fiction. In 1977, Richard A. Lupoff described it as the best of Ballard’s catastrophe novels, calling it "idiosyncratic but highly effective" and "a very important science fiction book." In an obituary appreciation, John Clute listed The Crystal World among Ballard’s early science-fiction novels and stated that the last three of those early works had become classics of the genre, characterizing them in relation to portrayals of "terminal catastrophe." The novel’s Japanese translation won the Seiun Award for Foreign Language Novel in 1970.

In the 2010s, the novel was often framed as a distinctive, aestheticized apocalypse in retrospective criticism. In an edited introduction excerpt published by The Guardian in 2014, Robert Macfarlane described it as a "dazzling work" and "most gorgeous calamity," presenting its apocalypse as a form of transfiguration and contrasting its prismatic style with Ballard’s later work. In 2015, Freeman wrote that, while it shares elements with Ballard’s earlier catastrophe novels, it is "much more beautiful, and more violent," and praised Ballard’s prose, writing that it "shimmers like a painting."
