= The Burning World (novel) =

1964 novel by J. G. Ballard

- Cover of the first edition
- Author: J. G. Ballard
- Cover artist: Richard M. Powers
- Language: English
- Publisher: Berkley Medallion
- Publication date: August 1964
- Publication place: United States
- Media type: Print (paperback)
- OCLC: 2235876

The Burning World is a 1964 novel by the English writer J. G. Ballard, first published in the United States by Berkley Medallion. A revised British edition was published in 1965 under the title The Drought. (Note: Attributed to multiple references:)

Set in a near-future world devastated by drought after industrial pollution disrupts the earth's water cycle, the novel follows the physician Charles Ransom as he moves through collapsing social and physical landscapes. It is commonly discussed as part of Ballard's early cycle of catastrophe novels and, retrospectively, as an early work of climate fiction.

Critics have read the novel in terms of ecological collapse, waste and scavenging, and the uneasy psychological accommodation of catastrophe. Contemporary reviewers including James Colvin and Judith Merril praised its originality and visionary atmosphere, while later commentators have emphasized its hallucinatory treatment of disaster and its focus on characters adapting themselves to ruined environments. (Note: Attributed to multiple references:)

== Background and publication ==
The Burning World was first published in the United States in August 1964 by Berkley Medallion. A British edition followed in 1965 under the title The Drought; reference works and later criticism treat it as a revised form of the earlier novel rather than a wholly separate work.

An extract from the novel, titled "The Draining Lake", was published in Ambit in 1965, the same year the British edition appeared as The Drought.

The novel belongs to the group of early catastrophe works through which Ballard established his reputation in the 1960s. Later scholars have commonly discussed The Burning World and The Drought within Ballard's early climate-disaster fiction, reading the book as part of a sequence of novels concerned with environmental transformation and the psychological effects of ruined landscapes.

== Plot ==
In a near future devastated by the collapse of the water cycle, the oceans are coated with industrial waste, evaporation falls away, and rivers, lakes, and reservoirs shrink into mud and salt. Dr. Charles Ransom, a physician separated from his wife Judith, refuses to join the exodus from Mount Royal. He remains on his houseboat in the drying lake district, drawn to the altered landscape and to the people who have chosen to stay behind. Among them are Catherine Austen, who refuses to abandon the zoo and its starving animals; the boatman Philip Jordan; and the architect Richard Lomax, who maintains an isolated estate with stolen water, attended by his sister Miranda and the servant Quilter.

Judith leaves for the coast with Captain Hendry, but Ransom stays. As order breaks down, Lomax tightens control over his estate and hoards supplies, while Quilter ranges through the burning city. Catherine withdraws into the zoo to live among the dying animals. Ransom eventually attempts to leave by river on his houseboat, but the route is blocked by violence and confusion. Philip Jordan rescues him in a skiff, and Ransom persuades Catherine to come with them. Before they flee, Philip insists on collecting his blind foster father, and they also take Mrs. Quilter with them. With Mount Royal burning behind them and cinders drifting across the emptied lake, the group moves toward the coast. At a final bottleneck near the sea they pass through gunfire and near massacre before reaching the shallows and collapsing into the water.

Ten years later, the coast has become another wasteland. Salt dunes, brine pools, rusting ships, and crude stills line the shore, and scattered settlements survive by trapping seawater at high tide, stealing it, and distilling it into drinking water. Ransom now lives in a shack made from wreckage and has drifted back into a worn companionship with Judith. Philip Jordan has become a hardened water-trapper, while Hendry serves a severe settlement ruled by the Reverend Johnstone. Ransom steals water, bargains for supplies, and endures raids, but he comes to believe that the coast offers only a suspended, miserable survival. When a lion appears far inland, he takes it as a sign that life may still persist around Mount Royal. He decides to return inland with Philip, Catherine, and Mrs. Quilter, and they haul a cart of supplies up the empty riverbed.

The journey north is slow and punishing. The travelers ration their water, camp among stranded trains and buried river steamers, and search for any trace of hidden springs. When they reach Mount Royal, they find an even harsher desolation. Ransom's houseboat has been looted, his concealed water tank is empty, and the city has become a field of dunes, bones, and wreckage. Then Ransom glimpses what seems to be a mirage but proves to be real: a small reservoir beside the ruins of Lomax's estate. Drawn there alone, he discovers that Lomax, Miranda, Quilter, Whitman, and a small group of dependents have survived by guarding the last remaining pool. Quilter now moves over the sands on stilts, Miranda watches over a group of children, and Lomax clings to the rituals of his former life. Ransom is absorbed into the oasis as tensions rise around the dwindling water supply. The fisherman Jonas, who had appeared earlier in the novel, reappears near the lake and is hunted by Whitman's dogs.

The final collapse comes when Lomax, in panic or malice, cuts breaches in the reservoir bank and lets the water drain away into the ground. With the pool gone, the last fragile order disintegrates. Catherine appears driving white lions across the dunes, scattering the dogs, while Philip returns carrying a spear and canteen. Jonas escapes once more into the wasteland. Quilter and Whitman turn on Lomax, kill him, and throw his body into a shaft. Afterward the little court dissolves. Mrs. Quilter dies and is buried in a luxury car beneath the sand. Philip and Catherine set out again in search of Jonas and of a river beyond the dunes. Ransom does not go with them, or remain with Miranda and Quilter. Instead he walks away alone across the drained lake bed and rising sand as rain at last begins to fall.

== Themes and analysis ==
=== Environmental catastrophe and climate-fiction framing ===
Critics have often situated The Burning World within Ballard's early catastrophe fiction and, retrospectively, within the development of climate fiction. In these readings, the novel's drought is not merely a spectacular backdrop but the condition that governs social life, perception, and behavior. Adrian Tait and Cenk Tan both read the catastrophe as linked to industrial pollution rather than to a purely natural disaster. Jim Clarke likewise reads Ballard's early disaster novels through a climatological frame, while Dini places The Drought among Ballard's 1960s climate-fiction works.

=== Waste, scavenging, and devastated material culture ===
A second line of criticism focuses on the novel's world of waste, salvage, and exhausted materials. Dini argues that Ballard presents environmental devastation not as simple emptiness but as a landscape of debris, remnants, and damaged matter, in which scavenging and reuse become central to survival and to the experience of place. Tan's social-ecological reading similarly connects the ruined environment to hierarchy, deprivation, and competition over resources. Moritz Ingwersen extends this emphasis on material attrition by reading the novel's erosion, dust, and blunted forms as signs of a broader environmental transformation that reshapes the human subject along with the landscape.

=== Ambiguous apocalypse and altered subjectivity ===
Critics have also stressed the novel's refusal of a straightforward disaster narrative. Lorenz J. Firsching argues that Ballard's early catastrophe fiction treats apocalypse as fundamentally ambiguous, unsettling stable distinctions between external disaster, social mediation, and psychic experience. Robert A. Latham similarly describes Ballard's disaster protagonists as seeking a form of psychic accommodation with the forces destroying their world, rather than confronting catastrophe in heroic terms. Jason Heller likewise emphasizes the novel's clinical, hallucinatory, and mirage-like treatment of disaster, reading resignation rather than warning as central to its effect.

This emphasis on accommodation has also informed ecocritical readings of the novel's emptied settings. Edita Jerončić and Brian Willems argue that The Drought reimagines ecological dystopia through what they call "vacuum ecology", in which near-emptiness of time and space becomes one way of living through catastrophe. Ingwersen similarly links the novel's imagery of erosion and dust to a diminished, almost geological mode of subjectivity.

Some critics accordingly discuss the novel alongside The Drowned World and The Crystal World as part of a broader catastrophe sequence in Ballard's early fiction. Do Hoon Bok, for example, treats the three novels as a catastrophe trilogy concerned with environmental change at the level of species history, while Ingwersen connects them through Ballard's early interest in environmental transformation and altered temporal experience.

== Reception ==
=== Contemporary reception ===
The novel was well received by some contemporary critics. Reviewing the British edition in 1965 under the pseudonym James Colvin, Michael Moorcock wrote that The Drought resisted conventional review because of its unusual method and atmosphere, but he praised it as an original and intellectually ambitious work. In The Magazine of Fantasy & Science Fiction, Judith Merril compared the novel favorably with The Drowned World, judging it the more readable of the two and suggesting that it might also be the stronger book.

=== Retrospective reception ===
Later commentary has generally treated The Burning World as an important example of Ballard's early disaster fiction. In retrospective discussions of his work, critics have emphasized the way the novel shifts attention away from adventure and toward psychological adjustment, environmental extremity, and altered perception. The book has also been noted for its dry, hallucinatory atmosphere and for its refusal to present catastrophe in straightforward moral or heroic terms.

Reference works have commonly placed the novel alongside Ballard's other early catastrophe novels as part of the body of fiction through which he established his reputation in the 1960s. In that context, The Burning World has continued to attract attention less as a conventional disaster novel than as a study of environmental ruin and the strange forms of accommodation it produces.
