= List of biopunk works =

This is a list of works classified as biopunk, a subgenre of science fiction and derivative of the cyberpunk movement. Some works may only be centered around biotechnologies and not fit a more constrained definition of biopunk which may include additional cyberpunk or postcyberpunk elements.

== Print media ==
=== Novels ===
- BIOPUNK: ARISTOTLE (2026) by Andy Siege
- The Butterfly Effect (2018) by Rajat Chaudhuri
- Blood Music (1985) by Greg Bear
- Change Agent (novel) (2017) by Daniel Suarez − described as doing for biopunk what William Gibson did for cyberpunk
- Clade (2003) and Crache (2004) by Mark Budz
- Darwin series (1999–2003) by Greg Bear
- Holy Fire (1996) by Bruce Sterling
- Leviathan Trilogy (2009–11) by Scott Westerfeld
- The Xenogenesis trilogy (1987–89) by Octavia E. Butler
- The Movement of Mountains (1987) by Michael Blumlein
- Ribofunk (1996) by Paul Di Filippo
- Rifter series (1999–2004) by Peter Watts
- Schismatrix (1985) by Bruce Sterling
- Sleepless series (1991–99) by Nancy Kress
- The Sky Lords trilogy (1988-1991) by John Brosnan.
- Unwind (2007) by Neal Shusterman
- Wetware (1988) by Rudy Rucker
- White Devils (2004) by Paul J. McAuley
- The Windup Girl (2009) by Paolo Bacigalupi − on Time's list "The Top 10 Everything of 2009"
- Winterlong (1990) by Elizabeth Hand
- Darkome (2024) by Hannu Rajaniemi

=== Short stories ===
- "The Brains of Rats" (1988) by Michael Blumlein
- The People of Sand and Slag (2004) by Paolo Bacigalupi
- "Gene Wars" (1991) by Paul J. McAuley

=== Graphic novels and comics ===
- Blame! (1997–2003) by Tsutomu Nihei
- Doktor Sleepless (2007–present) by Warren Ellis
- Fluorescent Black (2008–2010) by M.F. Wilson and Nathan Fox

== Film and television ==
=== Feature films ===
- Frankenstein (1931)
- Blade Runner (1982)
- Super Mario Bros. (1993)
- Gattaca (1997)
- eXistenZ (1999)
- Resident Evil series (2002–2016; 2021; 2026)
- Code 46 (2003)
- Tokyo Gore Police (2008)
- Splice (2009)
- Repo Men (2010)
- Antiviral (2012)
- Prometheus (2012)
- Vesper (2022

=== Short films ===
- LOOM (2012) by Jake Scott

=== Television series ===
- Dark Angel (2000–2002)
- 2030 CE (2002–2003)
- ReGenesis (2004–2008)
- Orphan Black (2013–2017)
  - Orphan Black – 7 Genes (2017–present)
- Kamen Rider Amazons (2016–2017)
- Biohackers (2020–2021)

== Video games ==
- The Ooze (1995) developed by Sega Technical Institute where a scientist gets turned into a blob-like creature by a chemicals corporation seeking to unleash on the world a bioweapon in the form of a virus that only them possesses the cure for;
- Terranigma (Tenchi Sōzō) (1995) and Final Fantasy VII (1997) are Japanese RPGs which feature some biopunk elements: the mad scientist Beruga in Terranigma and the Shinra Corporation in Final Fantasy VII are trying to control the world via biotechnology and genetic manipulations;
- Panzer Dragoon series (1995-2002) developed by Team Andromeda/Smilebit and published by Sega;
- Resident Evil series (1996–present) developed and published by Capcom;
- Parasite Eve (1998) developed by Square and published by Square Electronic Arts;
  - Parasite Eve II (2000) developed by Square and published by Square Electronic Arts.
- SiN series (1998–2006) developed by Ritual Entertainment (except for the expansion pack Wages of Sin that was developed by 2015) and published by Activision, features cyberpunk and biopunk elements;
- Evolva (2000) developed by Computer Artworks Ltd. and published by Interplay Entertainment;
- Dark Angel (2001) developed by Radical Entertainment for the TV series of the same name;
- Quake 4 (2005) developed by Raven Software and published by Activision;
- Rogue Trooper (2006) developed by Rebellion Developments and published by Eidos Interactive;
- Prey (2006) developed by Human Head Studios and published by 2K Games;
- BioShock series (2007–present) developed by Irrational Games and published by 2K Games;
- Fracture (2008) developed by Day 1 Studios and published by LucasArts;
- Prototype (2009) developed by Radical Entertainment and published by Activision;
- Killing Floor series (2009–present) developed and published by Tripwire Interactive;
- Crysis 2 (2011) developed by Crytek and published by Electronic Arts;
- The Deus Ex franchise (2000-2016), developed by Ion Storm and Eidos Montreal and published by Eidos Interactive and Square Enix Eu;
- Cruelty Squad (2021), developed and published by Consumer Softproducts;
- Athanasy (2022), developed by Wirion and published by 7DOTS;
- Scorn (2022), developed and published by Ebb Software;
- Ceiba (2023), developed by Wirion and 7DOTS and published by Moonworks.

== See also ==
- List of cyberpunk works
- Cyberpunk derivatives
- Genetic engineering in science fiction
