= Yellow Card Man =

- Short story by Paolo Bacigalupi
- Language: English
- Genre: Science fiction novelette

Publication
- Published in: Asimov's Science Fiction
- Publication type: Magazine
- Publication date: December 2006

"Yellow Card Man" is a science fiction novelette published in 2006 by Paolo Bacigalupi. It was nominated for the 2007 Hugo Award for Best Novelette, as well as finishing ninth for the Locus award, being a finalist for the Sturgeon award, and won the Asimov's Readers' Poll, all for best novelette. In the 2012 Locus on-line poll, it finished 13th for the best novelette of the 21st century. The story serves as a prologue for Bacigalupi's novel, The Windup Girl.

== Plot summary ==
The story follows Tranh, the once wealthy head of the multi-national "Three Prosperities" trading company, now a refugee suffering from PTSD, who is forced to eke out a living in the slums of a future Bangkok.

Genetically engineered plant pathogens have destroyed much of the world's crops, and Western biotech companies are busy selling disease-resistant seeds to third-world countries, while also re-engineering the pathogens to destroy the new plants after a few years, so that the companies can re-engineer the seeds to be resistant to the new diseases and thus repeat the cycle.

Prejudice and ethnic tension have boiled over in Malaysia, resulting in the Malays slaughtering the other ethnic groups. Tranh barely escaped the mobs, having seen his family hacked to death by machetes and his successful business looted and burned. He has made his way to Bangkok and has been granted refugee status—a "yellow card". Most refugees are despised and are relegated to scrounging for the lowest day-laborer work.

Ma, a former employee whom Tranh had fired for stealing, had left Malaysia for Bangkok well before the massacres, and thanks to having been in place before the flood of refugees, was able to find well-paying work.

The story opens with Tranh waking up late and rushing to get to a company he has heard will be hiring new employees. On his way, he encounters Ma. Tranh notices that Ma is wearing Tranh's old Rolex watch, which Tranh had been forced to sell for a pittance in order to survive. Ma, seeing that Tranh has noticed the watch, mocks Tranh for having fallen so far, and taunts Tranh for having once told him that individuals "make our own luck", that success is solely a result of earning it and that luck plays no part.

Finally arriving at the factory, Tranh finds that the rumor of job openings is true, but there is already a line of hundreds of refugees waiting ahead of Tranh for the interviews. Tranh talks with some friends in line, discussing how all of them are highly educated and formerly successful men—physics professors, heads of corporate legal departments, or like Tranh the former head of a multinational trading company—and so are all far overqualified for the three jobs as low-level managers. The seething frustration of other yellow-cards is directed at Tranh for "cutting in line" even though it obviously does not matter, so he leaves. Needless to say, the jobs are filled by the first few interviewees, long before the remaining hundreds of refugees are interviewed.

That evening, Tranh sees Ma again at a restaurant, and Ma invites him to eat and to talk. Ma thanks Tranh for having fired him, since it saved his life by forcing him to leave Malaysia long before the massacres. Ma explains to Tranh that he bought the watch because he recognized it and wanted it as a memento mori—a reminder that if a successful major company like "Three Prosperities" could fall, so could he. Ma tells Tranh that thanks to his work, he has finally gained Thai citizenship and will no longer be a yellow-card refugee. Tranh begs Ma for any sort of job, but Ma tells him it is impossible, that line work at his factory is not open to crippled refugees when legal Thai workers are available, and that Tranh's business experience does not qualify him for the sorts of scientific research for which a work permit could be obtained.

The next day, Tranh is injured while unloading a cart of potatoes, when a megodont - a genetically engineered elephant - goes on the rampage; his knee is destroyed, leaving him badly crippled. At that, he is fortunate, for one of his friends is killed by the animal. Tranh gets the supervisor to pay him double, both his own wages and the dead friend's, as compensation; he wastes the money on a last bottle of whiskey and hobbles off to await starvation and death.

However, while drunk and laying against a building late that night, Tranh sees Ma leave a brothel with his business manager, who departs in a pedicab. As Ma begins to walk home, Thai police accost him for being out after curfew, and when Ma attempts to explain that he is a Thai citizen, the police, hearing his Malay-Chinese accent, beat him and rob him for failing to grovel his respect.

Ma, badly beaten, begs Tranh to help him get home. Instead, Tranh murders Ma, smashing his whiskey bottle and slashing Ma's throat with the broken glass. He then robs Ma of his papers and money and takes a rickshaw to the factory where Ma worked. Although it is late at night, he knows there will be a job opening in the morning, and he wants to be the first in line to apply.

== Notes ==
Bacigalupi changed the name of the character from "Tranh" in the short story to "Hock Seng" in the novel, stating that his conception of the character had changed.

In the Stephen King novel, 11/22/63, a character is called the Yellow Card Man; the character is later found having slashed his own throat with a broken whiskey bottle.
