= The Doubt Factory =

2014 book by Paolo Bacigalupi

- First edition
- Author: Paolo Bacigalupi
- Language: English
- Genre: Young adult fiction
- Publisher: Little, Brown and Company
- Publication place: United States
- ISBN: 978-0-349-00256-9
- Followed by: The Water Knife

The Doubt Factory is a novel by Paolo Bacigalupi, published on October 14, 2014, by Little, Brown for Young Readers. The novel chronicles the adventures of youths and young adults intent on exposing corporate malfeasance. The title describes the efforts of corporate public relations efforts to cast doubt on scientific findings in order to prolong the life of a product. The book has been characterized as didactic, "backed up with references to actual front groups, lawsuits, warning labels, and literature on the subject". In another review, Cory Doctorow praises the work as both a polemic and a novel.
