= Fluorescent Black =

Fluorescent Black may refer to:

- Fluorescent Black (comics), 2008–2010 story in Heavy Metal magazine
- Fluorescent Black (album), 2009 album by American hip hop group Anti-Pop Consortium
