= List of Zentrix episodes =

The following is a list of episodes for the IMAGI animated television series Zentrix. The series has 26 episodes.

== Episode list ==
No.	Title	Original release date	Prod. code
1	"The City of Zentrix"	TBA	101
Zentrix City, world capital of the future ! From here the OmicronPsy Network, invented by scientific genius Emperor Jarad, controls the world. Thanks to robots with advanced thinking biochips, humans have never been so prosperous. But having been given "human characteristics", OmicronPsy was out of control and plans to usurp Jarad. The only thing Jarad can do to save mankind is to change history-by going back seven years in time and shutting down OmicronPsy's Zentrium CPU. But then he vanishes. From a hologram left by her father, Princess Megan, Jarad's 15-year-old daughter, discovers the truth about OmicronPsy, whose robots attack just as Megan and her pet dinosaur Mango escape using her father's time machine.
2	"Little Girl Megan"	TBA	102
Megan and Mango arrive back seven years in time. Due to a time machine malfunction, Megan has become a 15-year-old in an 8-year-old body. Then she stumbles across Zeus, the super-robot her father built to help him destroy OmicronPsy. Trouble is, most of Zeus' functions have been in lock mode, where he cannot function normally. Meanwhile, OmicronPsy uses the time machine to dispatch Stinger Bugs to assassinate Megan. Despite his "weakness", Zeus manages to defend Megan and Mango from the Stinger Bugs. Zeus then detects some weak signals coming from somewhere and which may be transmitted by her father. They set off in search of them. Back at Zentrix, OmicronPsy sends Dark-Alpha to attack Megan.
3	"The Forest of Peachi-Wigis"	TBA	103
Flashback to the run-off between Quantum and Zeus. Meanwhile, robots combing the Royal Palace for any remaining humans stumble across Quantum. After subduing him, OmicronPsy decides to brainwash him and send Quantum back 7 years to assassinate Jarad. But there's a problem. Meanwhile, in the forest looking for food, Megan, Mango and Zeus have a scary encounter with the Peachi-Wigis. Eventually, they all make friends and the Peachi-Wigis feed the starving trio. Then they show Megan the Communication Crystal they have found. From it comes the faint voice of Jarad's collaborator, Dr Roark.
4	"Showdown with Dark-Alpha"	TBA	104
At Zentrix, OmicronPsy repairs the time machine and speeds up the development of the Dark-Series robots. His first product is Dark-01, the brainwashed Quantum, who pledges to defend the Zentrium against Megan ! In the forest, the Peachi-Wigis tell Megan that Dr Roark has sought refuge in the Pyramid. Megan makes friends with them all immediately and goes off to play with them, leaving Zeus while his data uploads. However, one of the Peachi-Wigis messes up with Zeus's uploading programme, causing a bug. While playing, Megan encounters robot-assassin Dark-Alpha. Zeus, his systems restored, comes to Megan's rescue, and damages Dark-Alpha. Yet, Zeus suddenly encounters statics, and is forcefully turned back into lock mode, and is having trouble fighting against Dark-Alpha. Back at Zentrix, OmicronPsy deploys the Dark-Sphere robot to patrol the Pyramid.
5	"Sandstorm at the Pyramid"	TBA	105
In the desert, the Desert Five, "led" by Saiko, are unable to get supplies through to Dr Roark in the Pyramid because of the sandstorm generated by Dark-Sphere. OmicronPsy, meanwhile, plots to ambush Megan using Quantum-now Dark-01. Back in the desert, just as Zeus is having trouble with his power system, Megan gets attacked by the Big Tooth Bug. Zeus saves her. But since Zeus has lost his flight function, their journey across the desert to the Pyramid is taking so long that Megan is in danger of dying of thirst. Luckily, Megan is saved by the Desert Five. Megan gets a lesson in friendship from Saiko. They all head for the Pyramid, where they discover that the sandstorm is caused by a robot sphere. When Zeus attacks it, it spits out smart bombs which Zeus is able to destroy before his energy runs out. However, when Bronk saves Megan, he accidentally destroyed the device to power-up Zeus. Finally, the doors to the Pyramid open wide and Dr Roark emerges unscathed.
6	"Showdown with Dark-01"	TBA	106
Back in Zentrix City, Dark General displays the performance test to OmicronPsy about several tests comparing Dark-01 (Quantum) and Dark Alpha, Showing the superiority of Dark-01 against their robots, which pleases OmicronPsy well. At the Pyramid, when Dr Roark explains everything to Megan, she decides to complete her father's mission. To knock out OmicronPsy completely, Megan needs to shut down altogether six Zentriums. When she shuts down the first, at the Pyramid, OmicronPsy flies into a rage and sends Dark-01 (Quantum) after her. There is a huge robot fight, but in his powered-down state, Zeus is no match for Dark-01 and retreats with Megan. Dr Roark tells Megan and Zeus how to escape from the Pyramid. But, as they do so, again they are discovered by Dark-01. Eventually Megan and party are trapped in a chamber with no exit.
7	"The Deep Sea Monster"	TBA	107
After a precipitous fall down an escape chute, Megan and party land in a kind of warehouse, where they are again attacked by the pursuing Dark-01. Another pitched battle takes place. Back at Zentrix, meanwhile, OmicronPsy prepares new robots and summons Silver General. Deep in the Pyramid foundations, Megan locates the mini-submarine, in which they make good their escape. Diving into deep ocean, Megan and Zeus are chased all over by Dark-01, but at the last minute, the sound of torpedoes exploding rouses a gigantic fish-the Monster-which saves Megan by swallowing Dark-01 whole. The action is so violent that Megan and her friends all black out. Local resident, 11-year-old Nick, whilst out in his submarine, rescues Megan and party and takes them in tow.
8	"The Complete Zeus"	TBA	108
At Nick's laboratory, Megan tells her story to an incredulous Nick and then makes contact with Dr Roark who helps her restore Zeus to his full powers. In order to repay Nick for rescuing them, Megan decides to help him destroy the Monster that killed his father. His powers now fully restored, Zeus' CPU replays the encounter with the Monster for Nick to see. Nick outlines his plan to annihilate the Monster with the aid of some of his crackpot weapons. After lying in wait for it, Zeus avenges Nick's father by slaying the Monster. Nick then teams up with the trio and they all set off for the second Zentrium, located in the Underwater Stronghold. As well as sending Dark-02 into the attack, OmicronPsy also instructs Silver-01 and Silver-02 to set up a defense shield. Driving forward, Megan orders Zeus against the shield. It injures Zeus and forces Megan and her cohorts to retreat.
9	"The Wacky Robot Professor"	TBA	109
Nick tells Megan he doesn't like the way she just treats Zeus as a piece of expendable hardware and lectures her on the subject of friendship. As Dr Roark is unable to help fix Zeus' armor, Nick and Megan go and ask for assistance from Dr Coy, the robot expert. But he hates the monarchy, and refuses. But Megan goads him into accepting by challenging his robots to a video fight game. After she has beaten Dr Coy, he agrees to take a look at Zeus. But what he really wants is for Zeus to take part in illegal robot combat and stipulates that he will only agree to help him if Zeus wins. But in this fighting pit, all combat is to the death ! Meanwhile, back at Zentrix, OmicronPsy and Silver General plot to blow up Zeus and kidnap Megan.
10	"The Deadly Combat Pit"	TBA	110
A mysterious girl called Akina, who is actually Dr Coy's daughter, arrives with her robot, Fighter. She is an expert at Chinese-style kung-fu, and absolutely loathes Dr Coy. But before she can challenge Dr Coy, she must defeat the Chubby Brothers' robots. After Fighter has beaten their robots, The Blade and Hell Tank, she issues a direct challenge to Dr Coy. But Dr Coy insists that she beat Zeus first. So Fighter and Zeus fight it out until Zeus prevails. Dr Coy's then however insists that Zeus fight his robot King before he will agree to fix Zeus. The two robots clash and eventually Zeus wins when King loses one of his robot arms at the blink of having his head snapped off. Dr Coy keeps his word, and pledges himself to Megan's cause.
11	"The Two Silly Fathers"	TBA	111
OmicronPsy terrorizes the human populace by turning off all the computers and robots. Silver General presents Silver-02 to OmicronPsy. He is impressed and orders her to be sent back 7 years to deploy mini-bots and capture Megan. Returning to the laboratory on Dr Coy's truck, Megan learns how Dr Coy and her father fell out over the Zentrium biochip specification, and tells her that his is against towards giving so much thinking power to OmicronPsy, worrying that they may eventually turn against them. Then they are ambushed by the Silver-02. Zeus and the one-armed King try to defend but are paralyzed by the magnetic net. Luckily, Akina arrives with her robot Fighter who helps Zeus destroy Silver-02. Akina is in fact Dr Coy's daughter. Because Dr Coy was always busy with his research, after her mother fell ill and died, Akina always bore a grudge against her father. Megan encourages father and daughter to reconcile. Dr Coy tells Akina he really loves her.
12	"The Battle Below"	TBA	112
Dr Coy and Akina work together on a new suit of water-resistant armor and other weapons for Zeus. Zeus tests them successfully. Akina fixes King and Fighter. Megan and her partners, with King and Fighter, prepare to return to the Underwater Stronghold. But so does Dark-01 (Quantum). And OmicronPsy not only deploys Dark-03 but also booby traps the Zentrium. As they near the Undersea Stronghold, they encounter Silver-01 and the deadly mini-bots. A huge battle rages. Silver-01 is destroyed. Megan's sub has a few close shaves but makes it to the stronghold, from which Dark-02 suddenly emerges. Zeus engages him while Megan enters the stronghold. Dark-03 also appears. A major rumble takes place with Dr Coy and Akina controlling King and Fighter on manual, and eventually, just as Zeus is engaging Dark-02 in a fight to the death, the once-eaten Quantum appears again.
13	"Zeus Goes Missing"	TBA	113
Zeus is ambushed by Quantum/Dark-01 and Dark-02. As he was knocked out by Quantum, he was further powered up by the Zentrium and transformed into Fighting mode, due to his faith for everybody. He overpowers Dark-02 and Quantum. However, Quantum refuses to accept that his is not as powerful as Zeus currently does, he also transformed into his Fighting mode as well. As they enter the Zentrium chamber inside the Undersea Stronghold, Megan and Nick suspect they have walked into a trap. Sure enough, all kinds of weapons open up at them and, as they try to shut down the Zentrium, the voice of OmicronPsy announces they have activated a time bomb and have five minutes to get clear. Meanwhile Zeus and Quantum slug it out, and Dr Coy and Akina get King and Fighter to deal with Dark-03. Luckily, Nick discovers that they can delay the explosion by ten minutes-maybe-and so they make good their escape yet again, but without Zeus who is detained by Quantum. Right then the Zentrium self destructs in a huge explosion. Megan cannot tell whether Zeus has escaped. Megan finds it hard to hold back the tears.
14	"The Volcano Rockmen"	TBA	114
Since the explosion at the Undersea Stronghold, Nick realizes the wounded Megan really cares for Zeus. He asks Dr Coy if he could make a replica Zeus, but is told that because Zentrium chips are 'thinking' chips, any replica would not be identical and would have no memory of Megan. Meanwhile Dr Coy tells Megan that if they can find Zeus' Zentrium, then they can rebuild him. Megan is happy at this news. Megan, Clump and Morph take over from Nick in the search for Zeus. Back at Zentrix, OmicronPsy is enraged to realize that Quantum and Dark-02 probably bought it [but we see that Quantum survived the explosion]. He orders Dark-04 and Silver-03 to go and mount guard at the Volcano Stronghold, where Silver-03 then encounters the RockMen who live in the vicinity. The RockMen put up a fierce resistance to Silver-03, but still cannot hold up and was forcefully retreated. Megan and Nick prepare to set out for the Volcano Stronghold. Dr Coy gives them Fighter to ride shotgun.
15	"Zeus Returns!"	TBA	115
When Megan and her cohorts land at the Volcano Stronghold, they encounter the angry tribe of RockMen who assume Megan is on the same side as Silver-03. Fortunately, Megan is able to explain the situation. Meanwhile, Silver-03 spies on them from the volcano. Morph and Clump locate Zeus and Quantum by the side of the lake. Dr Coy sends King to help them. Meanwhile, OmicronPsy continues to beef up his preparations to capture Megan. Back at the laboratory, Dr Coy and Dr Roark successfully repair Zeus and Quantum. As soon as he is OK however, Quantum sneaks away. At the RockMen temple, Megan meets the RockMen elder, who tips her off that another robot has arrived at the Volcano Stronghold. Then Silver-03 attacks again. The RockMen and Fighter are hard pressed, but at the last minute, a huge red robot streaks in, annihilates Silver-03, and saves the day. Zeus is back!
16	"The Battle of the Volcano"	TBA	116
When the newly fixed Quantum leaves Dr Coy's laboratory, he wanders aimlessly trying to rediscover a sense of his own value, until he encounters Webster the BirdMan. Now that Megan has an alliance with the BirdMen and that Zeus is back on board, things are looking up! The only trouble is that the entrance to the Volcano Stronghold is also the site of the sacred image of the RockMan. Thus, not wanting to damage their credibility with the RockMen, Megan and Nick decide to enter the Volcano Stronghold directly via the mouth of the volcano itself. Finally, as Zeus and Dark-04 battle it out, Megan succeeds in shutting down the 3rd Zentrium.
17	"Quantum's Big Pal"	TBA	117
After the third Zentrium has been shut down, Megan and friends all celebrate. But soon they are preparing to go all out for their next objective: the Zentrium at the South Pole. Meanwhile Quantum and Webster go off looking for some fighting robots to fight. Not far from the location of the 4th Zentrium near the Sky Stronghold where Webster lives, they come under attack from Silver-04. Quantum and Webster have their hands full with Silver-04, and then Dark-05 joins in against Quantum! At this moment, Megan and Nick are hit by a snowstorm and get socked in on an ice floe at the South Pole. In the end, Quantum triumphs over his assailants but is seriously wounded in the process. In order to repay Quantum for his courage, Webster and the BirdMen urge Quantum to stay behind and rest his wounds. Quantum finally agrees.
18	"The Penguin Tribe of the North"	TBA	118
Setting off in search of the Snow-Stronghold, Megan slips off a cliff and is saved just in time by a penguin tribe. These fun-loving penguins press Megan and her pals into playing games with them, and only if Megan wins will they tell her the location of the fifth Zentrium. Megan can only go along with them. As she has lost contact with Megan and her party, Akina sends Fighter and King to lend support. On their way, they are attacked by Giant-Robot and Silver-05. Meanwhile, OmicronPsy has devised a new plan that will enable him to survive even if Megan shuts down all the Zentriums. However, there's still a fatal flaw in his design, so he recruits Dark-General to be his unwitting guinea pig.
19	"Brave Little Mango"	TBA	119
While making their way across the Snowlands, Megan and her party come across the badly wounded King and Fighter. Akina takes the injured robots back to Dr. Coy's lab. At Just as Megan reaches the Zentrium stronghold, Giant-Robot and Silver-05 appear. Zeus goes into action, but the battles are fierce. Despite a series of booby traps, Megan turns off the fourth Zentrium. However, Mango gets frozen solid when he heroically steps between Megan and a freeze gun. Meanwhile, OmicronPsy transforms Dark-General into a new robot that can take two Zentrium chips, independent of the Emperor's Zentrium. Dark-General is sent to the Sky-Stronghold to defend the fifth Zentrium, who was unaware of the fact that he was a guinea pig.
20	"Showdown with Dark-General"	TBA	120
Mango is sick, but recovering at Dr. Coy's lab. Dr. Coy gives Zeus a rocket kit to double his flying speed in the upcoming battle at the Sky-Stronghold. Dark-General arrives at the Sky-Stronghold to find Quantum defending it. When Zeus arrives, he and Quantum beat Dark-General once and for all. Meanwhile, Megan shuts off the Zentrium. Unfortunately, OmicronPsy now has all the data he needs to complete his plan to live independently of the Emperor's Zentrium. Quantum is also gravely injured, but he refuses to return to Dr. Coy's lab for help.
21	"Surprise Attack at Dr Coy's Lab"	TBA	121
Megan convinces Quantum to visit Dr. Coy and get help. This proves to be both a physical and emotional healing experience for Quantum, Dr. Coy, and Zeus. Dr. Coy also upgrades the robots and enlists the help of Blade and HellTank for the upcoming battle at the Space-Stronghold. They launched a virtual fight between Helltank and Blade against Neo-Helltank and Neo-Blade, and also a fight between Zeus and Quantum against Dark General. The former demonstrates the power of Zentrium, while the latter demonstrates the power of Golden mode. OmicronPsy is also preparing for the battle. He sends Silver-General to launch a surprise attack on Dr. Coy's lab, using decoy images to throw off her enemies. When Dr. Coy and Dr. Roark leave Megan and her friends at the lab for a short while, Silver-General prepares to launch her diabolical assault.
22	"Silver-General Gets the Upper Hand"	TBA	122
With Dr. Coy and Dr. Roark away from Dr. Coy's lab, Silver-General launches a three-pronged attack on Megan's party. First, she creates an image as a decoy to keep Zeus and Quantum busy. Second, she sends humanoid characters to attack Megan, Nick, and Akina. Third, she penetrates the heart of the lab to destroy all its vital robot-repairing machinery. Zeus and Quantum fight the decoy image while Fighter helps save the kids. Nick realizes that Zeus and Quantum are fighting an illusion and sends them to rushing to the lab, but it's too late: the lab explodes. Silver-General escapes and makes for the Space-Stronghold, where she plans to meet OmicronPsy.
23	"The Fight with OmnicronPsy"	TBA	123
Dr. Coy's lab is entirely devastated except for the time machine. Megan's party realizes now that defeating OmicronPsy is going to be harder than they thought. They fly to the holding place for the last of the Emperor's Zentriums, the Space-Stronghold. Meanwhile, OmicronPsy has already brought a spaceship to the stronghold. The ship contains new bodies for himself and Silver-General that will let them live without the Emperor's Zentrium once the transformations are complete. OmicronPsy unleashes a huge number of flying robots to attack Megan's party as they approach the stronghold.
24	"Nothing to Live For"	TBA	124
Megan and Nick are losing ground as they fight off OmicronPsy's huge fleet of flying robots until Zeus comes to the rescue. Megan enters the Space-Stronghold to try to turn off the last Zentrium. The robots clears the scene as they destroyed all of the guarding robots. Yet, before they try to follow up Zeus and Quantum, the Zom-01 suddenly falls from above and blocks their path. Helltank and Blade lure away and fight against him, but Fighter and King, who gets away from Zom-01, have themselves trapped against Zom-02 and Zom-03 as well. Meanwhile, Quantum was lured away by Silver General and a huge fight is on. Before Zeus can follow Quantum, he was ambushed by Silver-05 from above and was surrounded by the Silver series.
25	"Race Against Time"	TBA	125
Megan and Nick evade many booby traps and robot guards in reaching the sixth Zentrium, while the robots managed the way to break through the defense of the Zom- series and Silver series. Quantum, being tangled up by Silver general is rescued by Zeus and fights along, and finally kills her. However, OmicronPsy is enraged to see that Silver-General is dead. He declares that he now has nothing to live for, and he prepares to exact revenge upon Megan and her party. In the race against the clock, Megan finally successfully shuts off the last Zentrium, however, OmicronPsy is astonishingly not dead, but instead his is kicking alive with his new powerful body equipped with his own six Zentriums, making him independent from Jarad's Zentriums. Instead, he seeks revenge to Zeus and Quantum who killed Silver General during the last fight. Zeus and Quantum faces OmicronPsy in his new form, and tried everything to beat him but they failed. OmicronPsy lures Quantum into a one-on-one, effectively completely destroyed his right arm and left him seriously damaged. Zeus is the only hope who can fight against OmicronPsy.
26	"A Final Hope"	TBA	126
Quantum being damaged, Zeus goes full power against OmicronPsy, yet he does not manage to deal any damage. OmicronPsy decides to eliminate Quantum, Zeus tries to stop him. OmicronPsy went for Zeus instead and fires a full power beam. Quantum is serious damaged by OmicronPsy, realizing that he's not going to survive, temporarily blocks the attack with his shield, gives Zeus his Zentrium and dies. Zeus puts the second Zentrium in his own body, transforming him into "Ultra Mode." Megan and her allies arrived at the scene, but what's left is Quantum's broken arm and transformed Zeus fighting one-on-one against OmicronPsy, Omicron declared that he will destroy Zeus like he does to Quantum, but Megan insists fighting to the last and orders Zeus to destroy OmicronPsy. Though all of their best efforts, Zeus still cannot beat OmicronPsy. Knowing the fact that he couldn't stay a chance against him, Zeus tells Megan to go to the Time machine control room to activate the machine, while he will buy time and lure OmicronPsy into the time machine. He managed to boost the Zentrium chips' full power and entered golden mode and drags OmicronPsy into the time machine. After Megan's struggle inside her heart, she finally activates the time machine and sends them both into Stone Age. Before transportation, Zeus says his goodbye to Megan and ejects his two Zentrium chips, and all OmicronPsy's robots are turned off due to him was lost in time. after the war, Megan goes back to seven years later with Dr. Roark, Mango and Zeus' Zentrium, and finally says goodbye to the friends they've fought with together.

== See also ==
- Zentrix
- List of characters in Zentrix
