= TMNT (film) =

2007 film by Kevin Munroe

- American theatrical release poster
- Directed by: Kevin Munroe
- Written by: Kevin Munroe
- Based on: Characters created by: Peter Laird; Kevin Eastman
- Produced by: Thomas K. Gray; Galen Walker; Paul Wang
- Starring: Chris Evans; Sarah Michelle Gellar; Mako; Kevin Smith; Patrick Stewart; Ziyi Zhang
- Narrated by: Laurence Fishburne
- Cinematography: Steve Lumley
- Edited by: John Damien Ryan
- Music by: Klaus Badelt
- Production companies: Imagi Animation Studios; Mirage Studios
- Distributed by: Warner Bros. Pictures (North America, the United Kingdom, Ireland, France, Italy, Spain, the Benelux, Japan and China); Golden Scene (Hong Kong); The Weinstein Company (International)
- Release dates: March 17, 2007 (Grauman's Chinese Theatre); March 23, 2007 (United States); March 29, 2007 (Hong Kong)
- Running time: 87 minutes
- Countries: United States; Hong Kong
- Language: English
- Budget: $34 million
- Box office: $95.8 million

TMNT (abbreviated from Teenage Mutant Ninja Turtles) is a 2007 animated superhero film written and directed by Kevin Munroe in his feature directorial debut and based on the Teenage Mutant Ninja Turtles characters. The first animated film in the Teenage Mutant Ninja Turtles film series, it features the voices of Chris Evans, Sarah Michelle Gellar, Mako, Kevin Smith, Patrick Stewart, and Ziyi Zhang with narration by Laurence Fishburne. In the film, after having grown apart following the final defeat of their arch-enemy, the Shredder, the four Turtles — Leonardo, Raphael, Donatello, and Michelangelo (voiced respectively by James Arnold Taylor, Nolan North, Mitchell Whitfield, and Mikey Kelley) — are set to reunite and overcome their faults to save the world from evil ancient creatures.

Development and pre-production for TMNT began in June 2005 at Imagi's Los Angeles facility and the animation was produced in Hong Kong, followed by post-production in Hollywood. Munroe chose to produce the film in CGI animation as opposed to live-action like the prior Turtles films, in an effort to make it easier for audiences to suspend their disbelief. When writing the film, Munroe wanted to divert away from the lighthearted elements of the franchise and put a heavier emphasis on the darker tone of the original comics. The animators that worked on the fight sequences were inspired by Hong Kong action films.

TMNT premiered at the Grauman's Chinese Theatre in Los Angeles on March 17, 2007, and was released theatrically in the United States on March 23, by Warner Bros. Pictures. It was released in Hong Kong on March 29 by Golden Scene, and internationally distributed by The Weinstein Company. The film received mixed reviews from critics, but was a small commercial success, grossing $95.8 million worldwide against a $34 million production budget. Planned sequels were cancelled after Nickelodeon acquired the franchise in 2009, rebooting the film series with a live-action film in 2014.

== Plot ==
In ancient times, an Aztec warlord, named Yaotl, opens a portal into a parallel universe that grants him immortality, and petrifies his four generals: Aguila, Gato, Serpiente, and Mono. The portal also releases thirteen immortal monsters that kill his army and enemies, while becoming famous mythical monsters as centuries pass. However, many believe Yaotl's story is a myth.

In the present, the Teenage Mutant Ninja Turtles have grown apart after defeating the Shredder. For training, Master Splinter sends Leonardo to Central America, where he becomes the protector of a village, to which the villagers refer to him as the, "Ghost of the Jungle". Donatello works as an IT specialist, Michelangelo works as a birthday party entertainer named, "Cowabunga Carl," and Raphael continues to fight crime as a masked vigilante known as, "Nightwatcher," which he keeps a secret. The Turtles' old friend, April O'Neil, now operates a shipping company that acquires relics for collectors, assisted by her boyfriend, Casey Jones.

After traveling to Central America, April tells Leo that his brothers have drifted apart. She then returns to New York City with a statue for wealthy tycoon, Max Winters, who hires Shredder's former second-in-command, Karai, and the Foot Clan, to search the city for the thirteen monsters. Casey deduces Raph's double identity, and joins him in hunting criminals, while Winters, who is actually Yaotl, reanimates his generals, using technology created by his company.

Leo returns to the Turtles' lair, where Splinter forbids crime-fighting until they can work as a team. During training, they disobey Splinter and engage Bigfoot, one of the monsters, who is ultimately captured by the Foot Clan and Yaotl's generals. Splinter scolds the Turtles the next day for their disobedience, as the Foot and generals capture more monsters. Later, Raph and Casey encounter the Vampire Succubor, but they are spotted during its capture, and Raph is knocked unconscious after escaping. Casey and April care for him and alert the others, leading to the discovery of Yaotl's identity. Revived, Raph urges action, but Leo insists on Splinter's permission. Frustrated, Raph decides to investigate alone.

Donnie learns the next portal will open at Winters' tower, and Splinter urges Leo to find Raph. Yaotl reveals his plan to break the curse and restore his generals to humanity, unaware that they are plotting to betray him and remain immortal, feeling that Yaotl has grown too soft. As the Nightwatcher, Raph defeats the Jersey Devil in a diner, but Leo pursues him and finds out about his identity. Raph overwhelms Leo in battle, but he flees in shame upon nearly killing him. The generals, having already captured the Jersey Devil, then capture Leo to replace the thirteenth monster, prompting Raph to rally his allies to rescue him. As the portal opens, Yaotl discovers his generals' betrayal upon realizing that they only captured twelve monsters, as Splinter, the Turtles, Casey, and April fight through the Foot Clan to reach the tower and uncover his true intentions.

Refusing to betray Yaotl, Karai and the Foot Clan join forces with April and Casey to locate the final monster, the Sea Monster, while the Turtles battle the generals and Splinter and Yaotl fend off monsters emerging from the portal. April, Casey, and Karai bring the Sea Monster to the tower, where it collides with the generals. Yaotl saves the Turtles, while the generals are dragged into the portal and turned human before it closes. Karai warns the Turtles to savor their victory, hinting at the Shredder's return, before she and the Foot Clan leave. Now mortal, Yaotl thanks the team and fades into the afterlife, and his helmet joins Splinter's trophy collection alongside Raph's Nightwatcher helmet and Mikey's Cowabunga Carl mask. Returning to their roles as New York's protectors, Raph reaffirms that the Turtles will always be brothers.

== Voice cast ==
- James Arnold Taylor as Leonardo, the leader of the group, who has been training away in Central America and defends a village as the "Ghost of the Jungle".
- Nolan North as Raphael, the hot-headed brother, who has been secretly operating as the vigilante Nightwatcher.
- Mitchell Whitfield as Donatello, the genius brother, who has been operating as an IT tech support.
- Mikey Kelley as Michelangelo, the light-hearted and carefree brother, who has been operating as a birthday entertainer, "Cowabunga Carl".
- Sarah Michelle Gellar as April O'Neil: a young, virtuous archaeologist and friend of the Turtles owning a shipping company.
- Chris Evans as Casey Jones, April's boyfriend and a friend of the turtles who still engages in crime-fighting.
- Mako Iwamatsu and Greg Baldwin as Splinter, a mutant rat who is the turtles' father and sensei. Mako died during production; Baldwin was hired to finish recording the lines, but was uncredited for the role.
- Patrick Stewart as Max Winters, a businessman who is really the immortal warlord Yaotl, who desires to be mortal again and to make amends for his past errors.
- Ziyi Zhang as Karai, the Shredder's former second-in-command and the new leader of the Foot Clan.
- Kevin Michael Richardson as General Aguila, the leader of Yaotl's four generals; his name is Spanish for "eagle".
- Fred Tatasciore as General Gato, one of Yaotl's four generals; his name is Spanish for "cat".
- Paula Mattioli as General Serpiente, one of Yaotl's four generals; her name is Spanish for "snake".
- John DiMaggio as Colonel Santino, a South American bandit group leader who has been extorting protection money from the local villagers.
- Kevin Smith as an unnamed cook at a diner where Nightwatcher fights the Jersey Devil.
- Laurence Fishburne as the Narrator.

== Production ==
=== Development ===
Following the box office failure of Teenage Mutant Ninja Turtles III (1993) and the cancellation of a fourth installment, New Line Cinema concluded the film series abruptly which led them not to release another TMNT film. In 2000, an animated Teenage Mutant Ninja Turtles film was first announced, with John Woo supposedly directing, but the project languished in development hell, and Woo ultimately moved on to other projects. TMNT, executive produced by the characters' co-creator Peter Laird, departs from the previous films' live action style and is the first CG animated film in the series. Writer/director Kevin Munroe said that he wanted to do total CGI instead of live action and CGI turtles because it would be easier for the audience to "suspend disbelief for such an offbeat story" as there would be no break in the reality between CGI and live action. Producer Tom Gray explained that the decision to depart from the live action series was due to escalating budgets for the three films, and with each film making less than its predecessor, a CGI film became a reality. For example, the first film made $135.2 million on a budget of $13.5 million, and the third made $44 million on a budget of $21 million. Orange Sky Golden Harvest's rights to the franchise had expired, and Gray said the question arose there over a CGI TMNT film in 2004.

=== Writing ===
Munroe stated in terms of the story line that ideas were floated as extreme as the Turtles being in space, but eventually it just came back to New York City, and the theme of the family that had fallen apart. When developing the screenplay, Munroe wanted to take on a less lighthearted tone or "less Cowabunga" and place an emphasis on dark elements as shown in the original comics to appeal to the mature audience: "I had a very specific tone because mixing that sort of action and comedy is a very specific thing. Most people were just coming and wanting to make it too funny. I think that version of the movie could do really well, but we wanted to do something where it sort of pushes the envelope a little bit more and says that animation is more than just comedic animals bumping into each other and farting!"

Munroe said that in design and in the rendering of the animation, he was after the feel of a comic book. Karai was one of Munroe's favorite characters from the comics and he "was the one who really pushed for Karai" to appear in the film. TMNT co-creator Peter Laird stated it takes place in its own universe separate from the previous films, but director Munroe says the film exists in the same continuity as the other films, which was supported by the memento wall at the end of the film.

=== Animation ===
Development and pre-production for TMNT began in June 2005 at Imagi's Los Angeles facility and the CGI animation was produced in Hong Kong, followed by post-production in Hollywood. In designing the New York backdrop, art director/concept artist Simon Murton stylized the familiar Manhattan skyline and urban landscapes: "We began with cinematic cues from certain black-and-white films from the 1940s and '50s. I really wanted to push the lighting and the environments to create the look and feel of an alternate reality".

The animators that worked on the fight sequences were inspired by Hong Kong action films. Animation director Kim Ooi explains said that because of CGI they were able to "push and stylize beyond the limits of live action." Imagi used Autodesk Maya with Pixar's RenderMan for the production pipeline's back-end.

=== Casting ===
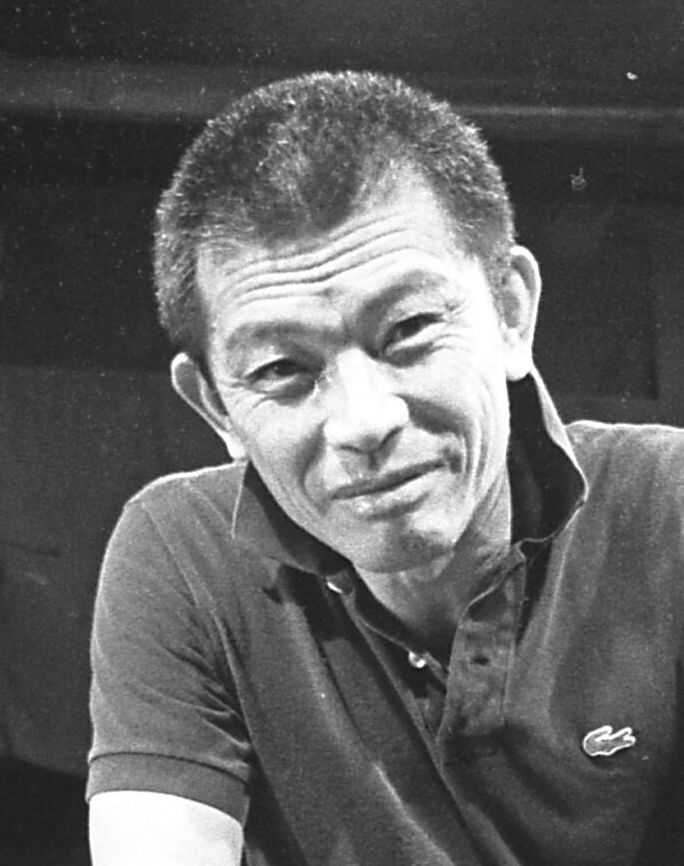
Iwamatsu's performance as Splinter would be his final acting role.

TMNT would be Mako Iwamatsu's final acting role. Mako was announced as the voice of Splinter at San Diego Comic-Con on July 20, 2006. He then died the next day, aged 72. A dedication to Mako appears at the end of the film's credits. Although Mako is the only actor credited in the role, Greg Baldwin performs a substantial portion of Splinter's dialogue in the finished film; Baldwin had already mimicked Mako's voice when he took up the late actor's role as Iroh in the concurrently-produced animated series Avatar: The Last Airbender, and used this precedent to successfully lobby to join the cast of TMNT as Splinter following Mako's death.

== Music ==
=== Soundtrack ===
The licensed soundtrack TMNT: Teenage Mutant Ninja Turtles was released by Atlantic Records in 2007.

== Release ==
=== Marketing ===
At the 2006 San Diego Comic-Con, the TMNT panel screened an exclusive preview that contained a Splinter voice-over with facial tests, concept art, muscle and dynamic fight tests, and a few comedic scenes. A sneak peek booklet containing storyboards, environment designs and character designs by comic artist Jeff Matsuda was also distributed at the convention.

Several tie-in products were released in 2007. The McDonald's fast-food chain had the film-based toys to collect with the purchase of a Happy Meal. A series of action figures based in the film's characters was released by Playmates Toys. A novelization, adapted from Munroe's screenplay by Steve Murphy, was published by Simon Spotlight. A five-issue prequel comic miniseries was published by Mirage Comics.

=== Theatrical ===
TMNT was released theatrically in the United States on March 23, 2007, by Warner Bros. Pictures, in Hong Kong by Golden Scene, and internationally by the Weinstein Company. The film was originally set for release domestically (USA and Canada) on March 30, 2007, which would have been the 17th anniversary of the release of the first TMNT film. The March 30 date was advertised in the teaser trailer and early posters, but the release was moved up to March 23.

=== Home media ===
The film was released on DVD, HD DVD and Blu-ray on August 7, 2007 by Warner Home Video. In 2009, a box set with all four TMNT films was released to celebrate the franchise's 25th anniversary.

== Reception ==
=== Box office ===
TMNT ranked number one at the box office on its opening weekend, beating 300 (the top film of the previous two weeks), The Last Mimzy, Shooter, Pride, The Hills Have Eyes 2, and Reign Over Me. Weekend estimates showed that the film made $25.45 million over the weekend of March 23–25, 2007. The film grossed $95.8 million million worldwide, including $54 million domestically during its 91-day run in the 3,120 North American theaters.

=== Critical response ===
On the review aggregator website Rotten Tomatoes, 36% of 120 critics' reviews are positive, with an average rating of 5.2/10. The website's consensus reads: "TMNT's art direction is splendid, but the plot is non-existent and the dialogue lacks the irony and goofy wit of the earlier Ninja Turtles movies." Metacritic, which uses a weighted average, assigned the film a score of 41 out of 100, based on 21 critics, indicating "mixed or average" reviews. Audiences polled by CinemaScore gave the film a grade "A−" on a scale from A+ to F.

Claudia Puig of USA Today gave a negative review, stating that the film "is trying for a new image. But it takes more than an awkward title attempting to sound cool to overcome its mundane plot and silly dialogue". Michael Ordona of the Los Angeles Times wrote that "despite the doll-like cartoonishness of the human figures, the filmmakers seem to expect us to take this animated romp seriously. Too seriously". Wesley Morris of the Boston Globe called the film "a junk-food pastry. The plot is the wrapper. The action is the oily sponge cake. And the message—family, family, family—is the processed cream filling".

Todd Gilchrist of IGN gave the film a positive review, calling it "a fun, action-filled adventure that will satisfy longtime fans and generate a legion of new ones, whether it be by virtue of simple storytelling, solid CGI, carefully-choreographed action, or just the spirit and energy that only the Turtles can create".

Stephen Hunter of The Washington Post felt that the film "is technically superb and quite enjoyable as long as you don't bang your head against the plot, which will cause hot flashes, premature aging and fallen arches".

According to Steven Rea of The Philadelphia Inquirer, the film is "not so dark or scary as to keep most kids away" and it "has a cool, noirish sheen. There's an attention to detail in the visuals and sound design that pushes it up several notches above most kiddie fare".

=== Accolades ===
At the 35th Annie Awards, TMNT received a nomination for Outstanding Storyboarding in a Feature Production (Sean Song). It was nominated for Best Comic Book Movie at the 2007 Scream Awards.

== Video games ==
Three beat'em up/action adventure game/platformer adaptations of the film were developed and released by Ubisoft in 2007 for a variety of video game consoles. A mobile game TMNT: The Power of 4 was also developed by Overloaded and released by uClick that same year. In addition, characters from the film are available in Ubisoft's 2009 Wii and PlayStation 2 fighting game Teenage Mutant Ninja Turtles: Smash-Up, while artworks from the film are available in this game as unlockable content.

== Cancelled sequels and reboot ==
In 2007, Munroe stated that he would like to direct a possible sequel to TMNT, possibly involving the return of the Shredder. Munroe planned a trilogy. TMNT 2 would have loosely adapted the Turtles’ 13-part comic book saga "City At War". Michelangelo would have felt rejected and joined the Foot Clan, while the Turtles would have traveled to Japan and would have crossed paths with Karai and Shredder. TMNT 3 would have featured the Triceratons as well as the Technodrome’s arrival from Dimension X. Munroe wanted Michael Clarke Duncan to voice the Triceraton's leader, Commander Mozar. YouTube commentator RebelTaxi noted that these sequels could not materialize due to Munroe leaving Imagi, layoffs in the studio, and Astro Boy (2009) being a box office bomb that ultimately led to Imagi's bankruptcy. In an interview, Laird stated he was interested in the idea of having the next film be a live-action and CGI hybrid film, with the Turtles rendered in CGI and Sarah Michelle Gellar and Chris Evans reprising their TMNT roles in live-action. The live-action concept would later evolve into Teenage Mutant Ninja Turtles, an unrelated reboot released in 2014.
