= Paolo Bacigalupi =

American science fiction and fantasy writer (born 1972)

- Bacigalupi at the 2026 World Fantasy Convention
- Born: August 6, 1972 (age 54); Paonia, Colorado, U.S.
- Education: Oberlin College
- Occupation: Writer
- Writing career
- Period: 1999–present
- Genres: Science fiction, biopunk, young adult fiction
- Notable works: The Windup Girl; Ship Breaker
- Notable awards: Hugo; Nebula; John W. Campbell Memorial; Michael L. Printz; Compton Crook; Theodore Sturgeon
- Website: windupstories.com

Paolo Tadini Bacigalupi (born August 6, 1972) is an American science fiction and fantasy writer. He has won the Hugo, Nebula, John W. Campbell Memorial, Compton Crook, Theodore Sturgeon, and Michael L. Printz awards, and has been nominated for the National Book Award. His fiction has appeared in The Magazine of Fantasy & Science Fiction, Asimov's Science Fiction, and the environmental journal High Country News. Nonfiction essays of his have appeared in Salon.com and High Country News, and have been syndicated in newspapers, including the Idaho Statesman, the Albuquerque Journal, and The Salt Lake Tribune.

== Early life ==
Bacigalupi was born in Paonia, Colorado. He graduated from Oberlin College with a major in East Asian Studies.

== Career ==
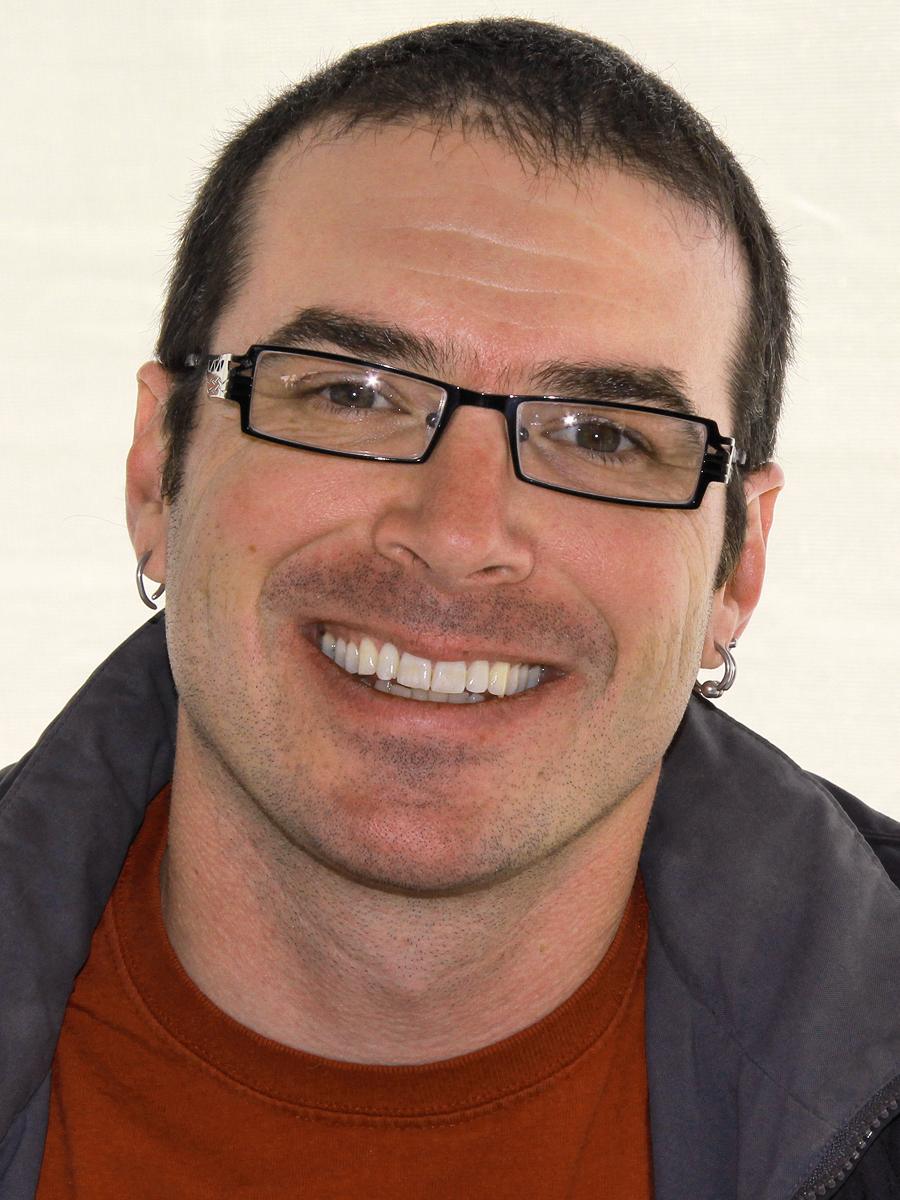
Bacigalupi at the 2012 Texas Book Festival

Bacigalupi's short fiction has been collected in the anthology Pump Six and Other Stories (Night Shade Books, 2008). His debut novel The Windup Girl, also published by Night Shade Books in September 2009, won the Hugo, Nebula, and John W. Campbell Memorial Awards in 2010. The Windup Girl was also named by Time as one of the "Top 10 Books of 2009". Ship Breaker, published by Little, Brown and Company in 2010, was awarded the Michael L. Printz Award for the "best book written for teens", and was nominated for the National Book Award for Young People's Literature.

== Themes ==
The Windup Girl, along with many of his short stories, explores the effects of bioengineering and a world in which fossil fuels are no longer viable. Bioengineering has ravaged the world with food-borne plagues, produced tailored organisms as mimics to both cats and humans, and replaced today's fossil-fuel reliant engines with muscle power, whether human or engineered animal. Energy storage is accomplished through the use of high-capacity molecular torsion springs, as well as simply transporting food to feed either megodonts (bioengineered elephants) or human laborers. His writing deals with the ethics and possible ramifications of genetic engineering and western dominance, as well as the nature of humanity and a world in which, despite drastic changes, people remain essentially the same. Similar themes run through his book The Water Knife (2015), where a future American Southwest is reduced to a dystopian Dust Bowl where water is a guarded commodity for the wealthy and powerful interests.

== Awards and nominations ==
- 2005: Nominated for Hugo Award for Best Novelette for "The People of Sand and Slag" (The Magazine of Fantasy & Science Fiction, February 2004)
- 2006: Nominated for Hugo Award for Best Novelette for "The Calorie Man" (The Magazine of Fantasy & Science Fiction, Oct/Nov 2005)
- 2006: Nominated for Nebula Award for Best Novelette for "The People of Sand and Slag" (The Magazine of Fantasy & Science Fiction, February 2004)
- 2006: Won the Theodore Sturgeon Award for "The Calorie Man" (The Magazine of Fantasy & Science Fiction, Oct/Nov 2005)
- 2007: Nominated for Hugo Award for Best Novelette, for "Yellow Card Man" (Asimov's Science Fiction, December 2006)
- 2009: Nominated for Hugo Award for Best Novelette, for "The Gambler" (Fast Forward 2)
- 2009: Won the Locus Award for Best Collection, for Pump Six and Other Stories (Night Shade Books, 2008)
- 2009: Won the Locus Award for Best Novelette, for "Pump Six" (Pump Six and Other Stories, Night Shade Books, 2008)
- 2010: Nominated for Nebula Award for Best Novelette for "The Gambler" (Fast Forward 2, Pyr Books), Oct 2008
- 2010: Nominated for the National Book Award for Young People's Literature for Ship Breaker, Little, Brown 2010.
- 2010: Won the Compton Crook Award for Best First Novel for The Windup Girl, Night Shade Books, 2009
- 2010: Won the Hugo Award for Best Novel for The Windup Girl, Night Shade Books, 2009 (tied with China Miéville's The City & the City)
- 2010: Won the John W. Campbell Memorial Award for Best Novel for The Windup Girl, Night Shade Books, 2009
- 2010: Won the Locus Award for Best First Novel for The Windup Girl, Night Shade Books, 2009
- 2010: Won the Nebula Award for Best Novel for The Windup Girl, Night Shade Books, 2009
- 2011: Nominated for the Andre Norton Award for Young Adult Science Fiction and Fantasy for Ship Breaker, Little, Brown 2010.
- 2011: Nominated for the Nebula Award for Best Novella for The Alchemist, Subterranean Press, 2010.
- 2011: Won the Michael L. Printz Award for Best Young Adult Novel for Ship Breaker, Little, Brown 2010.
- 2012: Won the Prix Planète SF des blogueurs for The Windup Girl (French edition)
- 2012: Won the Seiun Award for The Best Translated Novel for The Windup Girl, Hayakawa Publishing Corp, 2011.
- 2013: Won the Seiun Award for The Best Translated Short Story for "Pocketful of Dharma" (Pump Six and Other Stories, Hayakawa Publishing Corp, 2012)
- 2015: Nominated for the Edgar Award for Best Young Adult Novel for 'The Doubt Factory', Little, Brown 2014.

== Bibliography ==
=== Novels ===
- The Windup Girl (Night Shade Books, 2009)
- The Water Knife (Alfred A. Knopf, 2015)
- The Tangled Lands, with Tobias Buckell (Saga Press, 2018)
- Navola (2024)

==== Young adult ====
- Ship Breaker trilogy
  - Ship Breaker (2010)
  - The Drowned Cities (2012)
  - Tool of War (2017)
- The Doubt Factory (2014)

==== Younger readers ====
- Zombie Baseball Beatdown (2013)

=== Novellas ===
- The Alchemist (Subterranean Press, 2011) (collected in The Tangled Lands)

=== Collections ===
- —— (2008). Pump Six and Other Stories. Night Shade Books.
  - "Pocketful of Dharma" (1999)
  - "The Fluted Girl" (2003)
  - "The People of Sand and Slag" (2004)
  - "The Pasho" (2004)
  - "The Calorie Man" (2005)
  - "The Tamarisk Hunter" (2006)
  - "Pop Squad" (2006)
  - "Yellow Card Man" (2006)
  - "Softer" (2007)
  - "Pump Six" (2008) (orig)

=== Short stories ===
^{α} collected in Pump Six and Other Stories
^{β} original to Pump Six and Other Stories

- "Pocketful of Dharma" (1999) ^{α}
- "The Fluted Girl" (2003) ^{α}
- "The People of Sand and Slag" (2004) ^{α}
- "The Pasho" (2004) ^{α}
- "The Calorie Man" (2005) ^{α}
- "The Tamarisk Hunter" (2006) ^{α}
- "Pop Squad" (2006) ^{α}
- "Yellow Card Man" (2006) ^{α}
- "Softer" (2007) ^{α}
- "Small Offerings" (2007)
- "Pump Six" (2008) ^{β}
- "The Gambler" (2008)
- "Moriabe's Children" (2014)
- "Shooting the Apocalypse" (2014)
- "A Hot Day's Night" (2015)
- "City of Ash" (2015)
- "Mika Model" (2015)
- "A Passing Sickness" (2017)
- "Fixable" (2019)
- "American Gold Mine" (2019)
- "A Full Life" (2019)
- "Efficiency" (2021)

=== Audiobooks ===
- The Alchemist and the Executioness (2010) with Tobias S. Buckell
