= The Gambler (Bacigalupi story) =

- Short story by Paolo Bacigalupi
- Language: English
- Genre(s): Science fiction novelette

Publication
- Published in: Fast Forward 2
- Publication type: Book
- Publication date: 2008

"The Gambler" is a science fiction novelette published in 2008 by Paolo Bacigalupi. It was nominated for the 2009 Nebula Award for Best Novelette and the 2009 Hugo Award for Best Novelette.

== Plot summary ==
“The Gambler,” written by Paolo Bacigalupi, is a science fiction novelette focusing on a young news reporter that is struggling to adapt to the fast-paced American culture. After the pretender monarch Khamsing completely burglarized the entire country of Laos, forming the New Lao Kingdom, Laos, otherwise referred to throughout the story as “the black hole,” went into shambles. Concluding that their son should not be in such a chaotic and violent monarchy, his parents shipped him over to Los Angeles, where he became a news reporter at Milestone Media. The company's maelstrom, called LiveTrack IV, is supposed to be tremendously significant to the world of media. Livetrack IV tracks media user data such as Web site, feed, VOD, audio stream, and TV broadcast. Unfortunately for Ong, Milestone Media primarily infatuates itself with the popularity of their company. The number of click-throughs, page views, social-pokes, and ad revenue a story accumulates are precisely what Janice Mbutu, Milestone's managing director, is looking for. She emphasizes the significance of happy, fun, and pleasant reports from her staff. This inaugurates a crucial dilemma for Ong, who enjoys more serious and idealistic topics to write about, involving areas pertaining to politics, government, and environment. When Janice sees that Ong is amassing less than a thousand pings on his byline feed on average, she threatens to terminate him if he does not start accumulating at least fifty thousand pings daily. Marty, a top notch worker who generates an incredible number of readers, clicks and amount of ad dollars by formulating the story about a Russian cowboy rapper who is accused of impregnating a fourteen-year-old, speculates that Ong is on the verge of termination, and makes him a proposition. Marty offers him to interview Kulaap, an Asian pop sensation residing from Laos, whom Omg admire. Obviously, Ong agrees to take the job. When Ong is introduced to her, she is not what he expected. She seems almost entirely Americanized. He becomes even more astonished when she bluntly criticizes the questions Ong asks her during the interview. Kulaap then proceeds to put on a show for the paparazzi by taking him out on a date to a Laotian restaurant, initially for the mere fact that she wanted to help him boost his numbers. As the date progresses however, the chemistry between them amplifies. They proceed to discuss their similar experiences and adventures in Viantiane as well as other parts of Laos. The date goes amiss when the topic of Ong's stories commences. Kulaap openly blurts out disparaging remarks regarding his writings. Ong takes some offense to this and becomes uncontrollably irritated. He compares the workers in his field to a smart monkey, asserting that they will talk about whatever they think you want to hear, completely dismissing anything else that might be depressing or negative, even if it's a pivotal and consequential subject. Ong then demands for the limo driver to stop the car so he can leave. After returning to work, Janice immediately insists that Ong publish his interview/date with Kulaap. Ong boldly denies her request which only infuriates Janice. Ong tells her the next story he wants to publish is on his idea on bluets, a flower that is close to extinction because of global warming. Janice opposes the idea, postulating that nobody will read it. Infuriated, Janice bluntly threatens that Ong have fifty thousand readers daily or else she will terminate him, which will lead to his deportation back to the chaotic Laos. Gambling nearly his entire life on this decision, he boldly clicks the button to have his article published.
