= The Water Knife =

2015 novel by Paolo Bacigalupi

- Author: Paolo Bacigalupi
- Cover artist: Oliver Munday
- Language: English
- Subject: Climate change; Droughts; Water rights; Deserts; Refugees
- Genre: Science fiction; Biopunk; Dystopia fiction
- Publisher: Alfred A. Knopf
- Publication date: 26 May 2015
- Publication place: United States
- Media type: Print (hardback & paperback)
- Pages: 371
- ISBN: 978-0-385-35287-1
- OCLC: 900869568
- Dewey Decimal: 813.6
- Website: windupstories.com/books/water-knife/

The Water Knife is a 2015 science fiction novel by Paolo Bacigalupi. It is Bacigalupi's sixth novel, and is based on his short story, The Tamarisk Hunter, first published in the news magazine High Country News. It takes place in the near future, where drought brought on by climate change has devastated the Southwestern United States.

== Synopsis ==
In a future dystopian Southwest United States, the effects of climate change have led to the drying up of the Colorado River. The lack of water has caused Texas to become uninhabitable, and the remaining states and cities fight for drinking water through water rights. The narrative follows three characters whose fates intertwine: Angel Velasquez, a “water knife” who sabotages the water supply of rival cities; Lucy Monroe, a Pulitzer Prize-winning journalist; and Maria Villarosa, a Texas refugee.

Angel Velasquez works for Catherine Case, a magnate who uses hardball tactics to secure water for Las Vegas. Case sends Angel to investigate the city of Phoenix, Arizona, which is rapidly developing despite its lack of water. There, Angel meets up with Julio Gúzman, another of Case’s agents. The two investigate a mass murder where one of Julio’s associates was killed. They meet Lucy, who is investigating the same crime scene over the death of James "Jamie" Sanderson, a lawyer at Phoenix Water.

Concurrently, Maria struggles to pay her rent to the Vet, a gang leader in Phoenix. She sells water to laborers, aided by the senior hydrology specialist Michael Ratan, but her profits are stolen by gang members. Desperate for money, she and her friend Sarah perform sex work for Ratan at his arcology apartment.

The next morning, Ratan gives Maria his copy of Cadillac Desert as a gift. Before Maria can leave, two intruders kill Ratan and Sarah. The intruders depart after taking Ratan's computer and kidnapping Lucy, who has followed a lead from the murders to Ratan's apartment. Later, Angel tracks Lucy to Ratan’s apartment, having put a tracker on Lucy’s truck. He and Maria escape the arcology while evading Californian agents. Maria helps Angel identify one of the two intruders to be Julio based on a tattoo.

Angel finds Julio and his accomplice at a safe house torturing Lucy; he kills the two and rescues her. Lucy informs Angel of what she learned: Jamie had found an old agreement between the Pima tribe and the city of Phoenix which would secure a significantly valuable amount of water for anyone who held it. Jamie sold the senior water rights to California through Ratan. Ratan reneged on the deal with California and sold the rights to Las Vegas. Julio killed Jamie and Ratan to sell the water rights himself. Incorrectly believing that Lucy was close to Ratan, Julio had tortured her in an attempt to access Ratan's computer. As Lucy and Angel investigate the water rights, their relationship deepens on a romantic level.

Ratan’s computer turns out to be empty. Case and the Californians believe that Angel has seized the water rights for himself, and attempt to kill him. After surviving several murder attempts, Angel realizes that Maria unwittingly has the water rights hidden inside Ratan’s copy of Cadillac Desert. Angel and Lucy chase after Maria, who has left Phoenix in hope for a better life north, and find her about to cross the Colorado River. Angel wants to give the water rights to Case in exchange for amnesty, but Lucy wants the rights to save Phoenix. While Angel can't bring himself to attack Lucy, Maria shoots and critically wounds Lucy in hopes to gain entry to Las Vegas. The book ends with the sound of approaching Las Vegas helicopters in the distance.

== Reception ==
In a review published by NPR, Hugo Award winning writer Jason Heller says "Bacigalupi plays on a grand scale, but he does so with a keen eye for detail. His big triumph, though, is never forgetting that The Water Knife is a thriller at its pounding heart. Even amid reams of deeply researched information about the economy, geology, history and politics of water rights and usage in the United States, he keeps the plot taut and the dialogue slashing".

In his review for The Denver Post, Dave Burdick says the novel has a "rich" and "gritty" world, and comments that Bacigalupi knows the American Southwest well.

American crime novelist and editor Denise Hamilton, writing in the Los Angeles Times, compares the novel to the film Chinatown, and says that while "one is set in the past and the other in a dystopian future, both are neo-noir tales with jaded antiheroes and ruthless kingpins who wield water as lethal weapons to control life - and mete out death".
