= The Drowned Cities =

Young adult novel by Paolo Bacigalupi, sequel to Ship Breaker

- Hardcover edition
- Author: Paolo Bacigalupi
- Cover artist: Neil Swaab
- Language: English
- Genre: Young adult, survival, Dystopian
- Publisher: Little, Brown and Company
- Publication date: May 1, 2012
- Publication place: United States
- Media type: Print (Hardcover)
- Pages: 448 pp.
- ISBN: 978-0-316-05624-3
- OCLC: 1028980682
- Preceded by: Ship Breaker
- Followed by: Tool of War

The Drowned Cities is a 2012 young adult novel by Paolo Bacigalupi set in a post-apocalyptic future. The book is a sequel to Ship Breaker.

== Reception ==
The Drowned Cities was reviewed by Adi Robertson of The Verge, who wrote that the book "stands out as one of the most brutal pieces of YA fiction in recent years". According to Robertson, the book takes place in a realistic post-apocalyptic universe, and while the book takes on the theme of corrupting power, it is "almost uplifting".
