= Zentrix =

- A promotional poster for Zentrix.
- Genre: Animation; Action
- Created by: Tony Tang; Benny Chow; Felix Ip; Francis Kao
- Directed by: Tony Tang; Felix Ip
- Voices of: Michelle Ruff; Steve Blum; Stephen Prince; Brianne Siddall; Michael McConnohie
- Opening theme: "Zentrix" by Fiona Sit (Hong Kong) "Change the Future" by B'z (Japan)
- Country of origin: Hong Kong
- No. of episodes: 26

Production
- Executive producers: Michael Kao; Francis Kao
- Producer: Imagi Animation Studios
- Running time: 22 minutes

Original release
- Network: TVB (Hong Kong); NHK (Japan); M6 (France); Super RTL (Germany); Five (UK); SIC (Portugal); Globo (Brazil)
- Release: July 3, 2002 – 2004

Zentrix is a 3D-CG Hong Kong donghua TV series directed by Tony Tong and Felix Ip under the Hong Kong-based company Imagi Animation Studios. The original story was written by Tony Tang, Benny Chow, Felix Ip and Francis Kao.

== Synopsis ==
Princess Megan and her father

The series is set in Zentrix City, a seemingly "perfect" city. Emperor Jarad is a respected scientist who created a super-computer called OmnicronPsy, which manages all of the city's higher and day-to-day functions, controlling a wide variety of machines and robots, allowing humankind to live a seemingly "perfect" life.

However, OmnicronPsy, using its super-intelligence, decides that it would make a better ruler than Jarad, and breaks his coding that stops him from revolting. Discovering this, Jarad and the scientist Dr. Roark plan to head back in time 7 years to stop the revolt from ever happening. To do this they plan to shut down the six Zentrium chips that power OmnicronPsy. First however, Jarad takes precautions and develops two fighting robots - Zeus and Quantum. Zeus is then chosen over Quantum as the protector of his daughter, Princess Megan, should his mission in time fail. Following this, Jarad and Roark head back in time.

Princess Megan notices the disappearance of her father, and upon entering his study, she discovers a message. Megan then tries to get the Time Machine working. At the same time, OmnicronPsy has cracked the code and sends two robot guards to kill her. They find her just as she activates the time machine and open fire - damaging the time machine and altering Megan's body to that of an eight-year-old.

Awakening in a junkyard, Megan discovers her protector Zeus hidden inside a tower. Unfortunately, OmnicronPsy's forces manage to activate the time machine, and they head back in time to hunt her down, leading Megan to find the six hidden Zentrium chips. Along the way she makes new friends, including Nick, his adoptive father Dr. Coy, and Nick's foster sister Akina, as well as Zeus's "brother" Quantum, who is trying to do the right thing in the fight against OmnicronPsy.

== Characters ==
- Megan - The last hope for stopping OmnicronPsy, Princess Megan goes back in time 7 years. Unfortunately, due to an accident with the Time Machine she is reverted to an 8 years old. She journeys with Zeus, Mango and Nick to locate and shut down the six Zentrium chips that power OmnicronPsy.
- Mango - A Micro-saur, and faithful pet to Princess Megan. He was given to her as a baby when she was 7 years old. Megan is the only person capable of understanding Mango. He is bright orange, with orange eyes, green hair and two small wings on his back.
- Zeus - A robot created by Emperor Jarad and Dr. Roark to assist Megan through her adventure. Created alongside Quantum, the two are considered brothers. Hidden in the Junkyard, Megan finds him sealed inside a tower. Originally starting in a locked mode with no forms of attack, Zeus eventually enters Complete Mode. He also has a Fighter Mode and a Golden Mode.
- Nick - A junior scientist, Nick is the adopted son of Dr. Coy, making Akina his foster sister . He has a pet bird name TZ.
- Quantum - Zeus's "brother", a robot also created by Emperor Jarad, and Dr. Roark.
- OmnicronPsy - The main antagonist of the series. A super-computer created to provide human kind with a seemingly perfect lifestyle, until it rebels and attempts to take over the world. Megan and her friends are trying to shut OmnicronPsy down by finding all of the Zentrium chips that power it.

== English-dubbing cast ==
Actor	Role
Michelle Ruff	Megan
Steven Blum	OmnicronPsy
Stephen Prince	Zeus
Richard Cansino	Dr. Coy
Bob Papenbrook	Dr. Roark
Brianne Siddall	Nick
Melissa Fahn	Akina
Ezra Weisz	Mango
Mona Marshall	TZ; Little Rock
Lia Sargent	Silver-General
Ardwright Chamberlain	Webster
Michael McConnohie	Emperor Jarad; Dark-General; Quantum

== Theme songs ==
The theme song in Hong Kong was performed by Fiona Sit. In Japan, the theme song is called "Change the Future" performed by B'z.

== Awards ==
- Nominated at the "Best Series for Children of the Year" in the Pulcinella Awards 2002 in Positano, Italy.
- Received the "Gold Camera" award at the 2002 35th US International Film and Video Festival in Los Angeles.

== Video game ==
A PlayStation 2 game, entitled Jikuu Boukenki Zentrix, was developed by Sting Entertainment and published by Bandai in 2005 only in Japan.

== See also ==
- List of Zentrix episodes
