= Ship Breaker =

2010 novel by Paolo Bacigalupi

- Hardcover edition
- Author: Paolo Bacigalupi
- Cover artist: Neil Swaab
- Language: English
- Genre: Young adult, survival, Dystopian
- Publisher: Little, Brown and Company
- Publication date: May 1, 2010
- Publication place: United States
- Media type: Print (Hardcover)
- Pages: 326 pp.
- ISBN: 978-0-316-05621-2
- OCLC: 449282270
- Followed by: The Drowned Cities

Ship Breaker is a 2010 young adult novel by Paolo Bacigalupi set in a post-apocalyptic future. Human civilization is in decline for ecological reasons. The polar ice caps have melted, and New Orleans is underwater. On the Gulf Coast nearby, humanity has reverted to survival mode and a small economy has grown from the scavenging of washed up oil tankers for bits of copper and other valuables. The book is followed by The Drowned Cities (2012) and Tool of War (2017) taking place in the same fictional universe, together making up the Ship Breaker trilogy.

Nailer is a fifteen-year-old boy who works on the light crew. His mother died when he was a young boy and he now lives with his alcoholic and drug addicted father, Richard Lopez. After a storm, Nailer rescues Nita, the stranded daughter of a wealthy merchant, and helps her to get back home. This infuriates several parties, including Nailer's father, the local power brokers, and Nita's father's enemies, including Nita's uncle Pyce.

== Plot ==
Nailer, a small-framed teenage boy, is scavenging through an old rusty ship for copper wire. As he crawls through the darkness looking for scavenge to make quota, he dreams of traveling through the bright blue waters of the flooded oceans on a speeding clipper ship. While gathering copper wires, Nailer falls through the duct and lands in a deep pool of oil. Sloth, another member of the light crew, finds Nailer in the oil pocket, but decides to leave him to die because she wants Nailer's job and she wants to sneak the oil out of the ship and sell it. Luckily, Nailer is able to escape the oil and washes up on the beach. On the way out, Nailer is impaled by a rusty piece of metal. He survives.

A storm arrives shortly after Nailer's father, Richard, passes out due to a drug overdose. Sadna, Pima's mother, helps wake Richard up and saves him from the storm. After two nights, the storm finally subsides. Nailer and Pima decide to check the beach for scavenge. They find a massive clipper ship stranded on the beach. With a lot of hesitation, the two Light Crew teenagers save the only survivor of the ship, Nita, who is nicknamed "Lucky Girl" by Nailer, since she survived the shipwreck. After Nailer saves Nita, Richard wants to kill the girl and steal the scavenge. Pima lunges at Richard with a knife, but is overpowered. Richard decides to show mercy because Pima's mother, Sadna, had saved him from the storm. Knowing that there might be a reward for returning Nita to her father or uncle, Richard decides to spare her. Soon after, Nailer becomes sick and sleeps for 3 days.

"Lucky Girl" eventually tells Pima and Nailer the truth: she ran away to safety because her uncle, who wishes to sell illegal "tar sand", aims to use her as leverage against her father. Nailer decides to leave with Nita, and a half-man named Tool (originally in Richard's Heavy Crew) to New Orleans. After jumping trains, they arrive in New Orleans.

They wait for a ship called the Dauntless, a ship loyal to Nita's father, to arrive. Eventually the Dauntless arrives, but so does Richard. He is dressed as a swank (a rich man). Feeling suspicious, Nailer scouts the ship. After returning to his and Nita's hideout, he discovers that Richard and Nita's uncle, Pyce, have kidnapped her. Nailer joins Captain Candless and the rest of the Dauntless crew on a high-speed chase after the Pole-Star, the ship Nita is presumedly on. While on the ship, Nailer learns how to read and works on the gear systems in the depths of the ship.

During some high speed maneuvering, the Dauntless outsmarts the other ships, the Ray and the Pole Star, after sailing back to the gulf where the story started. The crew members of the Dauntless board the ship, and Nailer searches for Nita. He encounters his father and a fight ensues. Using his newfound ability to read and his experience with the gear systems, Nailer wins, killing Richard, and saves Nita. The book ends with Nailer meeting Nita again on the same beach they met.

== Characters ==
=== Major characters ===
- Nailer: The protagonist. He is a teenage scavenger who works on the "light crew". His only living blood relative is his abusive father. He was nicknamed by his father as "Lucky Boy" after surviving drowning in a pool of oil.
- Pima: Nailer's close friend. She is head of a section of the "light crew".
- Nita: The sole survivor of a shipwreck and the daughter of a global shipping family. Was nicknamed "Lucky Girl" by Nailer and Pima, due to the fact that she was the only survivor of the shipwreck.
- Tool: A "half-man" and a member of Richard Lopez's crew who helps Nailer.
- Sadna: Pima's mother. A veteran scavenger who works on the "heavy crew".
- Richard Lopez: Nailer's father and main antagonist of the story who is the leader of a heavy crew scavenge band.

=== Minor characters ===
- Sloth: A member of Nailer's "light crew" who is kicked out after leaving him for dead in an oil tanker.
- Bapi: Supervisor of the "light crew," Bapi is Nailer and Pima's boss, and is not known for his kindness or tolerance.
- Lucky Strike: Former salvage worker who struck oil and became rich. A sharp, benevolent wheeler-dealer with hands in everything from antibiotics to crystal slide.
- Blue Eyes: Member of Richard Lopez's crew, a hard stringy woman devoted to the Life Cult.
- Patel: The family name of a wealthy business mogul who profits from ship breakers. Lucky Girl claims to be related to them.
- Nathaniel Pyce: Nita's treacherous "business-marriage uncle," whose people are pursuing her to gain control of the family business empire and selling illegal "tar sand".
- Captain Candless: Captain of the Dauntless ship.
- Reynolds: Midshipman of the Dauntless and Captain Candless' first mate.
- Moby: A guard and crony of Richard Lopez.

=== Awards and nominations ===
- Finalist for the 2010 National Book Award for Young People's Literature and won the 2011 Michael L. Printz Award
- Winner of the Locus Award for Best Young Adult Book.
- Nominee for the 2010 Andre Norton Award for Young Adult Science Fiction and Fantasy and was listed on American Library Association's Young Adult Library Services Association list: 2011 Top Ten Best Fiction for Young Adults list.
