= The Sky Lords =

1988 science fiction novel by John Brosnan

- Author: John Brosnan
- Language: English
- Publication date: 1988

The Sky Lords (1988) is a science fiction novel by the Australian author, John Brosnan. It was published by VGSF and is the first book in the Sky Lords trilogy. It was followed in 1989 by War of the Sky Lords and in 1991 by The Fall of the Sky Lords.

== Translations and editions ==
The whole series was one of the first contemporary science fiction serials published in Eastern European countries like Bulgaria and Russia in the early to mid-1990s; however, after a brief wave of popularity, it has not been reprinted in paper since. The e-book division of VGSF, SF Gateway republished the book as an Amazon Kindle e-book.

== Plot ==
The story is set in the future, after the 'Gene Wars' have turned the Earth into a blighted wasteland. The inhabitants of Earth live a tribal-like existence and offer tributes to the Sky Lords. The Sky Lords live in giant airships and are the rulers of the people below. The protagonist (Jan Dorvin) is taken as a slave by the Sky Lords when her people rebel against their masters. The novel follows her fight for freedom and her relationship with Milo, a genetically altered survivor of the Gene Wars.

== Reception ==
The book received numerous reviews.
