= Imagi Animation Studios =

Animation studio in Hong Kong

Imagi Animation Studios Limited
- Type: Public SEHK
- Industry: CGI animation
- Founded: 2000; 26 years ago
- Defunct: 5 February 2010; 16 years ago
- Fate: Bankruptcy
- Headquarters: Chai Wan, Hong Kong
- Key people: President & Co-CEO: Francis Kao; Chairman: Francis Leung Pak To; Executive Director & Co-CEO: Soh Szu Wei
- Owner: Imagi International Holdings Limited
- Number of employees: 400 in Hong Kong
- Website: www.imagi.com.hk

Imagi Animation Studios, also known as Imagi Studios, was a computer animation and visual effects studio based in Hong Kong, and established in 2000 by Imagi International Holdings Limited (SEHK: 585), a Hong Kong–based investment company.

== Background ==
In 2000, Imagi Animation Studios was set up and production started on its first project, the CGI-animated television series Zentrix. The company had a studio in Chai Wan, Hong Kong, as well as a creative development and production facility in Los Angeles, California and a satellite office in Tokyo.

The company's first CGI-animated theatrical film TMNT was released on March 23, 2007, by Warner Bros. in the United States and Canada, opening No. 1 at the box office, and was being distributed internationally by the Weinstein Company. Imagi's focus was to create high-quality CGI-animated feature films with superhero themes to entertain global audiences, combining Hollywood storytelling with computer animation done in Hong Kong.

=== Setbacks and bankruptcy ===
In January 2009, Imagi's auditing firm announced that the studio lacked funding to complete the release of Cat Tale (which was to have been released by Metro-Goldwyn-Mayer) and Gatchaman. Art director Felix Ip reported that Gatchaman's release was not expected until later in 2009. In June 2009, Imagi opened Gatchaman to licensing partners and announced a 3-D theatrical release for 2011. In October 2009, Imagi released Astro Boy, based on the manga series of the same name. The film received generally mixed reviews from film critics and was a box-office bomb, losing the company $23 million in the process.

In January 2010, Imagi's Hong Kong–based parent company Imagi International Holdings Limited announced that the Gatchaman project will be "delivered in 100% Stereoscopic 3-D" and that in order to safeguard working capital, it closed its United States subsidiaries. This closure was finalized in late January with the layoff of approximately 30 staffers and the retaining of a few key personnel who will continue to work as consultants as Imagi seeks $30 million from investors to continue its animation projects.

On February 5, 2010, following the financial failure of Astro Boy, Imagi Animation Studios filed for bankruptcy.

== Works ==
=== Theatrical feature films ===
#	Title	Release date(s)	Distributor/Co-production with
1	TMNT	March 23, 2007	Warner Bros. The Weinstein Company
2	Astro Boy	October 8, 2009	Summit Entertainment

=== Television/Direct-to-video films ===
#	Title	Release date(s)	Distributor/Co-production with	Note(s)
1	Digital Monster X-Evolution	January 3, 2005	Toei Animation; Toei Company	Television film
2	Highlander: The Search for Vengeance	June 5, 2007	Madhouse; Manga Entertainment	OVA

=== Short films ===
#	Title	Release date	Associated Feature Film
1	The RRF in New Recruit	2010	Astro Boy
2	Astro Boy vs. The Junkyard Pirates	2010	Astro Boy

=== TV series ===
#	Title	Release date(s)	Distributor/Co-production with
1	Zentrix	2002	Bandai Entertainment
2	Father of the Pride	2004–2005	DreamWorks Animation; NBCUniversal Syndication Studios

=== Cancelled films ===
#	Title	Description
1	Gatchaman	Imagi began developing a film version in 2004, with producer Tom Gray saying that it would have a PG-13 or R rating. A Gatchaman film was first announced in February 2006, with an expected 2008 release. Kevin Munroe (TMNT) was scheduled to write and direct, with Lynne Southerland (co-director of Mulan 2) as producer, and an initial treatment was begun. However, in 2008 Munroe was taken off the project to direct Dylan Dog along with creative differences with Imagi & Warner Bros., who were planning to distribute the movie. Although early scripts were written by Paul Dini, in fall 2007 he was released from the project. In June 2007, Robert Mark Kamen was signed to write the screenplay in preparation for a 2008 release. At the July 2008 Comic-Con, Imagi introduced a Paul Dini-scripted trailer. In August, art director Felix Ip began posting screenshots from the trailer. At the July 2009 Anime Expo, Imagi shared another 45-second, Dini-scripted trailer. Although it did not reveal much plot, it was the first public look at the 3D characterizations of the main villain Galactor and the Gatchaman team in and out of costume. The trailer also introduced the film's theme: "A world in chaos, an alien evil, a lone warrior is found; Earth's last hope, five shall rise, Gatchaman." In July 2009 Imagi posted a new one-minute trailer for Gatchaman on its company website, with a release date of 2011. In December 2009, auditors reported growing concerns with the half-year results posted by Imagi. Although the company said that it was on course for the release of Astro Boy, according to the audit firm "It is uncertain whether the group will have the necessary financial resources to complete [the films] Gatchaman, Tusker, and Cat Tale." In January 2009, the auditing firm announced that the studio lacked funding for the release of Tusker, Cat Tale and Gatchaman, although Felix Ip reported that Gatchaman was expected to be released later in 2009. In June 2009, Imagi opened Gatchaman for licensing and announced a planned 3-D theatrical release in 2011. On December 11, 2009, Imagi's Hong Kong-based parent company, Imagi International Holdings Limited, laid off 100 employees. In January 2010 it announced that although the Gatchaman project would be delivered in 100-percent stereoscopic 3D, to safeguard working capital it would close its U.S. subsidiaries. The U.S. closure was finalized in late January, with about 30 staffers laid off and a few key personnel continuing as consultants as Imagi sought $30 million from investors for its animation projects. In February 2010 the parent company laid off another 300 employees, calling the layoffs temporary as it sought new investors. On June 21, 2011, Imagi announced in its annual report that the Gatchaman film project was cancelled.
2	T28	On December 26, 2008, Felix Ip, the creative director of Imagi Animation Studios, revealed screenshots from a computer-animated teaser trailer featuring Tetsujin and Black Ox. On January 9, 2009, the Japanese animation company Hikari Productions and Imagi launched the projects website, as well as the full teaser featuring Shotaro and Dr. Franken.
3	The Legend of Zelda	In 2007, Imagi Animation Studios, which had provided the animation for TMNT and Astro Boy, created a pitch reel for a computer-animated The Legend of Zelda film. Nintendo did not accept the studio's offer due to the memory of the failure of the 1993 live-action film adaptation of Super Mario Bros.
4	Cat Tale	Cat Tale was a planned animated film by Imagi Animation Studios starring Sean Astin, Elisha Cuthbert, Jerry O'Connell, David Cross, Catherine O'Hara, Rip Torn, Stanley Tucci, R. Lee Ermey, Michael Richards, Fred Willard, Chazz Palminteri, Wayne Knight, Billy Idol and Alan Cumming. Imagi Studios canceled the film in 2007, and closed altogether in February 2010 due to financial trouble about debts that they haven't paid their employees.
5	Tusker	In December 1998, DreamWorks and PDI announced their third computer-animated project titled Tusker, which was meant to follow Shrek. It would have been an original story chronicling a herd of elephants crossing southeast Asia. In their travels, they encounter a wide variety of dangers, including a band of marauding poachers. Tim Johnson and Brad Lewis, the co-director and producer of Antz respectively, were slated to direct and produce the project, and Morgan Freeman, Jodie Foster, Garry Shandling, Dana Carvey, Bruno Kirby and Don Knotts were part of the cast.
6	Trigun	
7	Fluorescent Black	Fluorescent Black is an original screenplay written in 2007 by writer/director M. F. Wilson and optioned by Imagi Studios who then commissioned the adaptation into the graphic novel.
8	Project: Monster	
