= The Windup Girl =

2009 novel by Paolo Bacigalupi

- Hardcover edition
- Author: Paolo Bacigalupi
- Cover artist: Raphael Lacoste
- Language: English
- Genre: Science fiction, Biopunk
- Publisher: Night Shade Books
- Publication date: September 1, 2009
- Publication place: United States
- Media type: Print (Hardback & Paperback)
- Pages: 361
- Awards: Hugo Award for Best Novel; Nebula Award for Best Novel; John W. Campbell Memorial Award for Best Science Fiction Novel; Seiun Award for Best Translated Novel; Compton Crook Award; Locus Award for Best First Novel; Kurd-Laßwitz-Preis for Best Foreign Work; Planete-SF Blogger's Award
- ISBN: 978-1-59780-158-4

The Windup Girl is a biopunk science fiction novel by American writer Paolo Bacigalupi. It was his debut novel and was published by Night Shade Books on September 1, 2009. The novel is set in a future Thailand and covers a number of contemporary issues such as global warming and biotechnology.

The Windup Girl was named as the ninth best fiction book of 2009 by Time magazine. It won the 2010 Nebula Award and the 2010 Hugo Award (tied with The City & the City by China Miéville), both for best novel. The book also won the 2010 Campbell Memorial Award, the 2010 Compton Crook Award and the 2010 Locus Award for best first novel.

== Setting ==
The Windup Girl is set in 23rd-century Thailand. Global warming has raised the levels of world's oceans, carbon fuel sources have become depleted, and manually wound springs are used as energy storage devices. Biotechnology is dominant and megacorporations (called calorie companies) like AgriGen, PurCal and RedStar control food production through "genehacked" seeds, and use bioterrorism, private armies and economic hitmen to create markets for their products. Frequent catastrophes, such as deadly and widespread plagues and illness, caused by genetically modified crops and mutant pests, ravage entire populations. The natural genetic seed stock of the world's plants has been almost completely supplanted by those that are genetically engineered to be sterile, forcing farmers to buy new seeds from the calorie companies every season.

Thailand is an exception. It maintains its own reserve of genetically viable seeds, fights off engineered plagues and other bioterrorism, and keeps its borders firmly closed against the calorie companies and other foreign biological imports. The capital city of Bangkok is below sea level and is protected from flooding by levees and pumps. The current monarch of Thailand is a child queen who is essentially a figurehead; the three most powerful people in Thailand are the Somdet Chaopraya (regent for the child queen), General Pracha (head of the Environment Ministry), and Minister Akkarat (head of the Trade Ministry). Pracha and Akkarat are longtime enemies, and represent the protectionist/independent/isolationist and internationalist/accommodationalist factions in the government, respectively.

== Plot summary ==
Anderson Lake is an economic hitman for the AgriGen Corporation, working in Thailand. He owns a factory mass-producing a revolutionary new model of kink-spring that stores gigajoules of energy, serving as a cover for his real mission: discovering the location of the Thai seedbank, with which Thailand has resisted the calorie companies' agro-economic subjugation. He has delegated the running of the factory to his manager, Hock Seng, a Chinese refugee from Malaysia who plots to steal the kink-spring designs to restore his lost fortune.

When Anderson visits a sex club, he meets Emiko, a "windup girl"—a genetically modified human created as a submissive servant but abandoned in Bangkok. Emiko lives in fear of the Environment Ministry and is held in bonded servitude. She reveals information about the secret seedbank to Anderson; in return, he tells her about a rumored northern refuge for her kind, making her determined to escape.

Meanwhile, the Environment Ministry's enforcement wing, the White Shirts, intercepts a valuable shipment of contraband. Foreign traders demand that Jaidee Rojjanasukchai, the zealous captain of the White Shirts, be punished. To force compliance, the Trade Ministry's Akkarat has Jaidee's wife kidnapped. When Jaidee retaliates, he is caught and killed, becoming a martyr as the remaining White Shirts rise up against the Trade Ministry. At the same time, Hock Seng discovers that factory workers are falling victim to a new plague originating from the kink-spring factory and goes into hiding, followed by Anderson.

Jaidee's protégé and successor, Kanya, discovers the new plague and tries to contain it while dealing with the guilt of being Akkarat's mole. She seeks help from Gibbons, a renegade AgriGen scientist now working at the Thai seedbank, who identifies the disease and links it to Anderson's factory.

Anderson meets with Akkarat and the nation's regent, the Somdet Chaopraya. Anderson offers an AgriGen army to repel the White Shirts in exchange for access to the seedbank. He later takes the Somdet Chaopraya to Emiko's club; when the regent sexually degrades her, Emiko snaps and kills him. Akkarat accuses the Environment Ministry of orchestrating the assassination, plunging the capital into civil war. Anderson shelters Emiko and makes a deal with Hock Seng to secure her safety.

The Environment Ministry is defeated, and Akkarat, now all-powerful, appoints Kanya as its new chief. He opens Thailand to the calorie companies and grants Anderson and AgriGen access to the seedbank. Kanya accompanies the corporate agents to the seedbank but turns on them, executing the AgriGen team. She directs the seeds to be moved to a secure location and uses the seedbank's heavy weaponry to destroy Bangkok's protective levees, intentionally flooding the capital to purge foreign influence.

In the aftermath, the capital relocates to Ayutthaya, and Akkarat is stripped of power. Anderson dies of the plague originating from his own factory. Emiko is found in the ruins by Gibbons, who promises to use her DNA to engineer a new, fertile race, fulfilling her dream of a future for her own kind.

== Awards and honors ==
In September 2010, the novel won the 2010 Hugo Award for Best Novel category, tying with China Miéville's The City & the City. In May 2010, the novel won the Nebula Award for Best Novel. In 2010, the novel won the John W. Campbell Memorial Award for Best Science Fiction Novel. In 2012 a translated version of the novel by Kazue Tanaka and Hiroshi Kaneko won a Seiun Award for "Best Translated Long Fiction" at the 51st Japan Science Fiction Convention. The German translation Biokrieg won the Kurd-Laßwitz-Preis in 2012. The French translation La Fille Automate won the Planète SF Award in 2012.

== Reception ==
Adam Roberts, reviewing the book for The Guardian, concludes "when it hits its sweet-spot, The Windup Girl embodies what SF does best of all: it remakes reality in compelling, absorbing and thought-provoking ways, and it lives on vividly in the mind." The Guardian later listed it as one of the five best climate change novels.

In SF Signal, Jason Sanford praised the novel as "expertly crafted with beautiful writing, sympathetic characters, and a fast-paced plot", and commended Bacigalupi for "combin(ing) a perfect ear for language with wonderful ideas and world-building", noting that the "moments of horrific violence" are "never gratuitous" but instead are "integral to the novel's plot".

In Strange Horizons, Niall Harrison stated that the novel was "irresistibly readable for long stretches", due to "the frantic excitement of uncertainty", but found its plot to be "slightly creaky". Harrison also compared Bacigalupi's "exploration of the submissiveness that shapes Emiko's responses in so many situations" to Richard K. Morgan's depiction of an equivalent situation in the 2007 novel Black Man, observing that the transition between Emiko's compelled behaviors and her independent actions is "unconvincing", with the result that she "feel[s] like a short story character, rather than a novel character: an argument rather than a person." Ultimately, Harrison felt that although the novel "is quite rigorously engaged with the legacies of colonialism and neo-colonialism, [it] is written by someone who benefits from those legacies."

In a long-form essay in The New York Review of Science Fiction, Eric Schaller analyzed Bacigalupi's use of science, saying that the novel resembles "pulp science fiction of a half-century ago, employing pseudoscientific MacGuffins to advance its plot and scientific vernacular as a suggestive but inaccurate veneer that does not withstand close inspection", and judging that although the novel "has much to recommend it", readers need not have "much of a background in science to recognize the fallacies inherent in many of the novel's faulty scientific explanations," which on several occasions made him "want() to hurl the book across the room because (...) its scientific fumbles [were] so aggravating." Schaller particularly faulted the existence of "cheshires" (a species of cat genetically engineered to be camouflaged so perfectly they are invisible, and which has replaced normal cats worldwide within twenty years of a small number of specimens escaping into the wild), which he held as an example of the novel's lack of "scientific coherence", such that "complex genetic feats are perceived as relatively simple to engineer (while) relatively simple genetic feats are ignored or assumed too difficult to consider."

James Nicoll similarly declared its "worldbuilding [to be] complete and utter tripe". He observed that the "energy density of [kink-springs] is implausibly, hilariously high", and rhetorically questioned why "anyone with a spring whose storage capacity challenges the limits of matter [would] think that the best way to wind them is with an animal", as he is unable to think of a less efficient way to charge a power storage device; he also emphasized that Emiko was abandoned in Thailand because of the expense of shipping her elsewhere, then asked how even wealthy people could travel in a setting where shipping "costs more per kilogram than (...) producing a new, adult, artisanally-educated slave". More generally, he commented on the novel's "use of grotesque, lavishly described sexual violence as a motivator", and the degree to which it is "replete with unfortunate stereotypes of Asian people".

Thai author Benjanun Sriduangkaew castigated Bacigalupi's portrayal of Thai culture, which she described as "exotifying, yellow-fever, offensive claptrap"; as well, Sriduangkaew noted that the book's acknowledgments did not mention the "names of [any] real, living Thai people the author's talked to while researching for this book".

In a 2011 interview, Bacigalupi said that the process of writing The Windup Girl was "really kind of painful and traumatic", and that the book's positive reception is "confusing" to him, emphasizing that "(w)ith Windup Girl, I felt ashamed all the time. I felt ashamed while I was writing it, I felt ashamed that I had written it, I felt ashamed that I was inflicting it on other people, and now I feel ashamed when people criticize it."

== See also ==
- Climate fiction
- Climate change in Thailand
