= The People of Sand and Slag =

- Short story by Paolo Bacigalupi
- Country: United States
- Language: English
- Genre(s): Science fiction

Publication
- Published in: The Magazine of Fantasy & Science Fiction
- Publication type: Magazine
- Publication date: February 2004

"The People of Sand and Slag" is a science fiction novelette by American writer Paolo Bacigalupi, first published in 2004. It was nominated for the 2005 Hugo Award for Best Novelette, the 2006 Nebula Award for Best Novelette and the 2005 Locus Poll.

On October 30, 2012, "The Drabblecast" podcast presented an audio dramatization by Norm Sherman, David Robison, Naomi Mercer and Mike Boris.

== Plot summary ==
The story follows three genetically modified humans who work as guards for a large mining conglomeration in a far future Montana. It begins with the three of them being called out to track down an intruder on their employer's property. When they finally corner it they realize it is nothing more than a dog. Fascinated by the fact that it could still survive in their day and age they decide to keep it as a pet, and then constantly struggle to keep it fed, clean, healthy and alive.
