= Michael Blumlein =

American writer and physician (1948–2019)

- Born: June 28, 1948; San Francisco, California, U.S.
- Died: October 24, 2019 (aged 71)
- Education: University of California, San Francisco
- Occupations: Author, physician
- Writing career
- Genres: Science fiction, fantasy, horror
- Website: www.michaelblumlein.com

Michael Blumlein, M.D. (June 28, 1948 – October 24, 2019) was an American fiction writer and physician.

== Profile ==
Blumlein attended medical school at the University of California, San Francisco and worked as a practicing doctor and member of the faculty at the University of California, San Francisco for decades.

The majority of Blumlein's fiction was in the fields of science fiction, fantasy, and horror. He was nominated for the World Fantasy Award and the Bram Stoker Award. Blumlein commenced his literary career in 1984 with the publication of the science fiction horror short story "Tissue Ablation and Variant Regeneration: A Case Report", which appeared in the British publication Interzone. This would become one of Blumlein's most reprinted and famous works.

Other short fiction has appeared in Interzone, The Magazine of Fantasy & Science Fiction and other publications. Well-known editor Ellen Datlow included Blumlein's work in a number of anthologies.

== Bibliography ==
=== Novels ===
- The Movement of Mountains (St. Martin's Press, 1987)
- X, Y (Dell, 1993)
- The Healer (Pyr, 2005)

=== Short fiction ===
==== Collections ====
- The Brains of Rats (Scream/Press, 1990). Collection of 12 stories.
- What the Doctor Ordered (Centipede Press, 2013). Collection of 14 stories and novellas.
- All I Ever Dreamed (Valancourt Books, 2018). A selection of 18 stories and novellas published between 1993 and 2016.
- Thoreau's Microscope (PM Press, 2018). Includes the title essay, 3 stories, a novelette, a bibliography and interview with Terry Bisson.
- Long (Subterranean Press, 2023). Includes all 7 of Blumlein's novellas and longer stories.
- Short (Subterranean Press, 2023). Includes all 29 of Blumlein's short stories.

==== Novellas ====
- The Roberts (Tachyon Publications, 2011)
- Longer (Tor.com, 2019)
