= Fluorescent Black (comics) =

- Cover art for the 2010 U.S. limited edition collected graphic novel.

Publication information
- Formats: Original material for the series has been published as a strip in the comics anthology(s) Heavy Metal.
- Genre: Science fiction
- Publication date: September 2008 – September 2010
- Number of issues: 3

Creative team
- Writer(s): M.F. Wilson
- Artist(s): Nathan Fox
- Letterer(s): Sean Konot
- Colorist(s): Jeromy Cox
- Editor(s): Justin Robinson

Fluorescent Black is a comics story published between 2008 and 2010 in Heavy Metal Magazine. It is one of the more popular series published in the magazine and is strikingly different in tone and style from many of the other stories Heavy Metal publishes.

== Publication history ==
The story appeared in three parts in Heavy Metal magazine vol. 32 #6 (September 2008), vol. 33 #6 (September 2009) and vol. 34 #6 (September 2010)

== Setting ==
The novel takes place in the year 2085 in the area surrounding Singapore and the Malaysian Peninsula. A large portion of the book is written in the native pidgin dialect of Singapore: Singlish.

Many real locations in Singapore and Malaysia, such as the Biopolis and Jurong Town and Taman Daya, are visited or referred to by the characters in the book.

The future, as portrayed in Fluorescent Black, is one where genetech advances have separated the human race into two separate races: Homo sapiens inferioris and Homo sapiens superioris. A mandatory bio-statistic test is used to determine which category each person falls into.

The Inferiors are labeled as such because they have congenital disorders, which means they are usually insane, sick, and dying. The Superiors are paragons of good breeding and have improved themselves with manufactured genetics, making them hyper-intelligent, strong, and healthy. The Inferiors live on the Malaysian peninsula (a dangerous ghetto overrun by splice animals and plants) and the Superiors live on the island of Singapore (a utopian city of the future). They are separated by an armed border.

The Inferiors often form into gangs that survive by kidnapping and ransoming Superiors, killing other Inferior gangs, or doing dangerous work-for-hire for Superior clients.

== Characters ==
Max: He's the de facto leader of The Butchers. Though he suffers from a neurological movement disorder called Dystonia, he is as tough as coffin nails. He's become emotionally numb from the things he has had to do to carve out an existence for his family. The only thing he truly cares about is his sister, Blue, and finding a way out of the ugly world they have landed in.

Blue: Max's twin sister and his better half. The dark deeds she and Max have done to survive weigh heavily on her conscience, which is why she medicates her emotional pain by smoking “the flower." She is terribly attached to her brother, worries about him constantly, and does not like to go anywhere without him.

Nina: She is the human property of Ugen corporation, stunningly beautiful and immune to all biological threats. She has spent her entire life being prepared for the moment when she will become a test model for a new Ugen genetics upgrade. Because she is inexperienced in life, she is completely naïve about the outside world, giving her a childlike innocence and curiosity about the people and places outside her bubble.

Dr. Anja Rupinder: He is over eighty years old but looks like he is in his mid thirties. His genius is the source of Ugen's highly successful transgenic research department. His focus is in “brain building". He has developed his magnum opus, a gene that will revolutionize the way humans think and communicate, and no moral barriers will stop him from seeing it through. He was the man who created Nina.

Lovely Boy: A light skinned lady boy. He is the Butcher's den mother. Despite his genetic "problems," he is blessed with a steady hand, a sharp eye, and an even temper. This makes him the perfect field surgeon and good with a gun.

Holiday: A towering Korean brute with a gleeful love of violence. He has been unstable since he was a kid in the street. His size and unnatural strength are frighteningly unchecked by his lack of impulse control.

Starlet: A psycho prostitute from Angels, a brothel for unusual tastes. She is the sworn enemy of the Butchers, her competition in the business of organ legging. While being somewhat scrappy and emaciated, it is almost impossible for her to be killed. The Butchers often refer to her and her gang as "The Roaches".

Mr. No Name: Part soldier and part businessman, he is the chief representative for PRO-TEC, a Malaysian military technology development corporation. He is a host to millions of microorganisms that repair and protect his body.

== Plot synopsis ==
In the first book, an Inferior named Max and his gang called "The Butchers" are hired by a Superior client working for Protech Biotechnology to commit a bioterrorist attack on their competitor Ugen Biotechnology. The Butchers travel across the border to a Ugen nursery outside of the city of Singapore. They release a spore inside the building. During the attack, they kidnap a Ugen clone named Nina and attempt to ransom her. Nina is the first model of a cutting edge grey matter genetic design created by the ultimately powerful and intelligent Anja Rupinder. It gives Nina an unpredictable and dangerous ability to create a "psychic transmission" that causes nearby people to hallucinate and also causes her to remember moments from their memory. This effect is similar to the Vulcan mind meld in Star Trek. This random mutation makes Nina's genetics priceless.

After Max and his crew discover their captive is worth billions of dollars they have to go on the run to avoid all of the people (mercenaries, police forces, and other gangs) who are trying to recapture Nina. They travel to strange areas like the Greenbelt, an unnatural ecosystem forming on the Malaysian Peninsula and a red light district for freakish prostitutes. At first, Max only sees Nina as an object for sale, but as he comes to treasure her innocence and naïveté, he becomes enthralled with her.

== Collected editions ==
The story was collected into a limited edition hardcover as well as paperback graphic novel by Heavy Metal.

== Adaptation ==
Fluorescent Black is an original screenplay written in 2007 by writer/director M. F. Wilson and optioned by Imagi Studios who then commissioned the adaptation into the graphic novel.
