= Biopunk =

Science fiction genre that focuses on technological use of life studies

Cover of Ribofunk by Paul Di Filippo, a seminal biopunk story collection

Biopunk (a portmanteau of "biotechnology" or "biology" and "punk") is a subgenre of science fiction that focuses on biotechnology. It is derived from cyberpunk, but focuses on the implications of biotechnology rather than mechanical cyberware and information technology. Biopunk is concerned with synthetic biology, and often involves bio-hackers, biotech megacorporations, and oppressive organizations that engineer DNA. Most often keeping with the dark atmosphere of cyberpunk, biopunk generally examines risks and downsides of genetic engineering and illustrates potential perils of biotechnologies.

== Description ==
Biopunk is a subgenre of science fiction closely related to cyberpunk that focuses on the near-future (most often unintended) consequences of the biotechnology revolution following the invention of recombinant DNA. Biopunk stories explore the struggles of individuals or groups, often the product of human experimentation, against a typically dystopian backdrop of totalitarian governments or megacorporations which misuse biotechnologies as means of social control and profiteering. The benefits of biotechnology, such as human enhancement and extended longevity, are often not evenly distributed and are controlled by corporations. Unlike cyberpunk, which builds upon information technology, biopunk focuses on synthetic biology. Similar to postcyberpunk fiction, individuals are often modified and enhanced. Instead of cyberware, individuals use genetic manipulation. A common feature of biopunk fiction is the "black clinic", which is a laboratory, clinic, or hospital that performs illegal, unregulated, or ethically dubious biological modification and genetic engineering procedures.

== History ==
Many features of biopunk fiction have their roots in William Gibson's Neuromancer, one of the first cyberpunk works.

The first to use the portmanteau was a Czech science fiction writer and biologist Eva Hauserová in 1988, for a subgenre developed as a response to cyberpunk in the conditions of the decaying real socialism, or slightly later, post-communism, "where you could not even find a working telephone booth". She described it in her English-language fanzine in December 1990 but that had a very limited distribution, not becoming available online until 2018. Mentions in a few British journals like Vector also went without attention.

One of the prominent writers in this field is Paul Di Filippo, though he called his collection of such stories ribofunk, a blend of "ribosome" and "funk". Di Filippo suggests that precursors of biopunk fiction include H. G. Wells' The Island of Doctor Moreau; Julian Huxley's The Tissue-Culture King; some of David H. Keller's stories, Damon Knight's Natural State and Other Stories; Frederik Pohl and Cyril M. Kornbluth's Gravy Planet; novels of T. J. Bass and John Varley; Greg Bear's Blood Music; Bruce Sterling's Schismatrix and Autonomous by Annalee Newitz. The stories of Cordwainer Smith, like his first and one of the most famous Scanners Live in Vain, also foreshadow biopunk themes. Another example is the New Jedi Order series published from 1999 to 2003, which prominently features the Yuuzhan Vong who use biotechnology exclusively.

== See also ==
- List of biopunk works
- Bioeconomy
- Climate fiction
- Cyberpunk derivatives
  - Nanopunk
  - Dieselpunk
  - Steampunk
  - Solarpunk
- Genetic engineering in fiction
- Grinder (biohacking)
- Human enhancement
- Transhumanism
