= List of fictional United States presidencies of historical figures (C–D) =

Lists of fictional presidents of the United States
A–B	C–D	E–F
G–H	I–J	K–M
N–R	S–T	U–Z
Fictional presidencies of historical figures
A–B	C–D	E–G
H–J	K–L	M–O
P–R	S–U	V–Z

The following is a list of real or historical people who have been portrayed as President of the United States in fiction, although they did not hold the office in real life. This is done either as an alternate history scenario, or occasionally for humorous purposes. Also included are actual US Presidents with a fictional presidency at a different time and/or under different circumstances than the one in actual history.

== C ==
=== John C. Calhoun ===
- In the alternate history novel The Probability Broach as part of the North American Confederacy Series by L. Neil Smith in which the United States became a libertarian state after a successful Whiskey Rebellion and George Washington being overthrown and executed by firing squad for treason in 1794, John C. Calhoun becomes the 6th President in 1831 after James Monroe dies in office. He is elected to a full term in 1832 and served as president until 1836 when he lost that year's presidential election to former president Albert Gallatin, who went on to serve as the 7th president until 1840.

=== Al Capone ===
- Al Capone is president of the United Socialist States of America in Kim Newman and Eugene Byrne's Back in the USSA, succeeding Eugene V. Debs following his death in 1926. Capone serves as a parallel to Joseph Stalin. He is succeeded by Barry Goldwater, who is himself a parallel to Nikita Khrushchev.
- In the short story "Boss" by Mark Bourne contained in the anthology Alternate Tyrants edited by Mike Resnick, Al Capone embarks upon a political career and establishes a decades-long Mafia-like presidency in the United States.

=== Jimmy Carter ===
- In a parallel universe designated Earth-81426 featured in the comic book What If? Volume 1 No. 26 (April 1981), Jimmy Carter ran for re-election against the Republican Party candidate Ronald Reagan and the New Populist Party candidate Captain America in 1980. While he praised Captain America for his long service to the United States, he noted that the superhero had no political experience. Captain America eventually won the election and was inaugurated as the 40th President on January 20, 1981.
- In the alternate history novel The Probability Broach by L. Neil Smith in which the United States became a libertarian state known as the North American Confederacy in 1794, "Jim-Earl" Carter was a peanut farmer in Georgia in 1986.
- In the alternate history novel Russian Amerika by Stoney Compton, Jimmy Carter is hinted as being a ranking member of the Confederate States military.
- In the short story "Demarche to Iran" by Alexis A. Gilliland contained in the anthology Alternate Presidents edited by Mike Resnick, Jimmy Carter lost the 1976 election to Gerald Ford after Ford gives former president Richard Nixon a specific, rather than a general, pardon, thus keeping his popularity high enough that he re-elected president when Illinois shifted from Democrat to Republican after the second recount.
- In the short story "A Dream Can Make a Difference" by Beth Meacham contained in the anthology By Any Other Fame, Marilyn Monroe survived her drug overdose on August 5, 1962 and subsequently entered politics. She was elected Governor of California in 1970, defeating her Republican opponent and fellow former Hollywood star Ronald Reagan. She later became the first female President in 1980 with Jimmy Carter as her vice president. After only 69 days in office, President Monroe was assassinated in Washington, D.C. on March 30, 1981 by John Hinckley Jr. as the culmination of an effort to impress Jodie Foster. Carter succeeded her as president.
- In a parallel universe featured in the Sliders episode "The Young and the Relentless", Carter was defeated by Howard Stern in 1980. Stern became the 40th President at the age of 27.
- In the alternate history novel series Southern Victory novel Settling Accounts: Drive to the East by Harry Turtledove, Jimmy Carter was a sailor in the Confederate States Navy during the Second Great War (1941–1944). In late 1942, while on leave in his home town of Plains, Georgia, Carter organised the defences of that town against a surprise raid led by the Negro guerrilla leader Spartacus. His efforts proved to be unsuccessful. He was killed by Major Jonathan Moss of the United States Army, who had rendered assistance to Spartacus and his followers, in front of his mother Lillian Gordy Carter. He was 18 years old at the time of his death.
- In the book The 80s A Look Back by Tony Hendra, Christopher Cerf, and Peter Elbling, a satire book published in 1979, Ted Kennedy wins the 1980 Democratic Party presidential primaries, and Jimmy Carter agrees to serve as vice president. They win the election after Kennedy promises Southern Senator Russell Long anything for his support, and reaches out to suburban voters by appointing Allan Bakke Surgeon General. However, when Long needs a liver transplant Bakke gives him Kennedy's only afterwards say "Now I remember, it's one liver and two kidneys." President Kennedy resigns for health reasons five days into his term, and Carter becomes President again. In 1984 Carter runs for the House of Representatives and is elected speaker. Republican Senator William Roth and Congressman Jack Kemp are elected president and Vice President on a promise to cut taxes. This leaves no money for their salaries, and both resign making Carter the president again.
- In the television series For All Mankind, in an alternate timeline where the Soviet Union being the first nation to put a man on the Moon resulted in an accelerated Space Race, Jimmy Carter was seen serving as a US Senator for Georgia in 1983, appearing on television to condemn the Soviet Union for shooting down of Korean Air Lines Flight 007, a casualty of which was NASA Administrator Thomas O. Paine.
- In the alternate history novella trilogy Then Everything Changed by Jeff Greenfield, Jimmy Carter lost the 1976 election after Gerald Ford clarified his statement that "there is no Soviet domination of Eastern Europe and there never will be under a Ford administration" during the second presidential debate. Despite winning the popular vote by around 1,500,000, Carter lost to Ford in the Electoral College by 272 to 266 after the latter narrowly won the electoral votes of Ohio and Mississippi due to a shift of 22,000 votes across both states. On February 29, 1980, Carter announced that he would not seek the Democratic nomination despite previously suggesting that he would without competing in the Iowa Caucus or the New Hampshire primary. In the Southern Super Tuesday primaries, Carter performed well as a write-in candidate in the Alabama, Georgia and Florida primaries, with his absence in part aiding the campaign of Gary Hart, who went on to win the nomination and the presidency.

=== Lincoln Chafee ===
- In a tangent during the ninth episode of SBNation's documentary series The History of Charging the Mound, sportswriter Jon Bois imagines an alternate world where George W. Bush becomes a national laughingstock after failing to intervene in the Nolan Ryan-Robin Ventura fight in 1993, which changes the course of history enough to make Chafee the President in 2026.

=== Dave Chappelle ===
- President in a sketch on Chappelle's Show In the "real" version of Deep Impact, Chappelle reveals that America has the cure for AIDS, has mastered cloning, and has made contact with aliens, who then take him to safety on their spaceship. Unfortunately, President Chappelle went missing during his third term and was subsequently replaced by Vice President Charlie Murphy.

=== Dick Cheney ===
- Becomes the 44th President after the assassination of George W. Bush in the 2007 British film by Gabriel Range Death of a President. As President, Cheney uses the possible al-Qaeda connection of the suspected assassin to push his own agenda, calling for "PATRIOT Act III", giving government agencies increased investigative powers on US citizens and others.
- Dick Cheney becomes the 44th President after the impeachment of George W. Bush in the final episode of the short-lived comedy series That's My Bush!.

=== Frank Chodorov ===
- In the alternate history novel The Probability Broach as part of the North American Confederacy Series by L. Neil Smith in which the United States became a Libertarian state after a successful Whiskey Rebellion and George Washington being overthrown and executed by firing squad for treason in 1794, Frank Chodorov is chosen by the Continental Congress as H. L. Mencken's successor after he is killed in a duel in 1933. He would serve as the 20th President of the North American Confederacy from 1933 to 1940.

=== Henry Clay ===
- In the alternative history novel 1824: The Arkansas War by Eric Flint, Henry Clay wins the heavily contested 1824 presidential election when it is thrown into the House of Representatives against Andrew Jackson. Clay forms a political alliance with William Crawford and John C. Calhoun while John Quincy Adams supports Andrew Jackson. Clay had engineered a conflict against the independent Arkansas Confederacy (a nation of voluntarily transplanted southern Indian nations and free Negroes) by secretly and illegally arming a freebooter expedition led by Robert Crittenden that was intended to (and did) fail miserably.

=== Grover Cleveland ===
- In the short story "Patriot's Dream" by Tappan Wright King contained in the anthology Alternate Presidents edited by Mike Resnick, Samuel J. Tilden defeated Rutherford B. Hayes in 1876 and went on to be re-elected in 1880. He eventually founded the Liberal Party. Tilden's vice president was General Winfield Scott Hancock, who went on to be elected president himself in 1884 and 1888 with Cleveland as his vice president. Cleveland received the Liberal Party's presidential nomination in 1892, which he was widely expected to win. His running mate was Susan B. Anthony.
- In the short story "Love Our Lockwood" by Janet Kagan in the anthology Alternate Presidents edited by Mike Resnick, Grover Cleveland lost the 1888 election to Belva Ann Lockwood, who became the 23rd President as well as the first woman to hold the office. In 1892, Cleveland defeated Lockwood and became the 24th President. He had previously been the 22nd President from 1885 to 1889.

=== Bill Clinton ===
- In an alternate timeline featured in Branch Point by Mona Clee, Bill Clinton lost his bid for re-election in 1996 to George Wallace, who became the 43rd President. The novel was published in January 1996, indicating that the author may have believed that Clinton would lose that year's presidential election.
- In the alternate history short story "Hillary Orbits Venus" by Pamela Sargent, Bill Clinton was elected president in 1992 and 1996. His two immediate predecessors were John Glenn and Bob Dole. His vice president was Newt Gingrich, who had a reputation as a hatchet man for the President. Clinton was married to the former actress Mary Steenburgen Clinton, who had given up for her burgeoning acting career to serve as her husband's adviser and campaign manager. In 1979, she starred in the science fiction film Time After Time, in which Malcolm McDowell played H. G. Wells. At the time, it was rumored that Mrs Clinton and McDowell had had an affair.
- In the third season of the alternate history television series For All Mankind, in which the Soviet Union being the first nation to put a man on the Moon resulted in an accelerated Space Race, Bill Clinton won the 1992 Democratic primaries over Al Gore, the incumbent vice president to Gary Hart, but lost the election to Republican candidate Ellen Wilson, one of NASA's first female astronauts, a former NASA Administrator, and the US Senator from Texas. In the fourth season, it was revealed through newsreel footage that Bill and Hillary Clinton divorced in 1998.

=== Chelsea Clinton ===
- Is the President of the United States by 2049 on Zenon: Girl of the 21st Century. She is never actually seen on screen. Chelsea Clinton would be 69 years old by the year this movie takes place.
- Is the President of the United States in 2021 in the comic book series Liberality For All.
- In an underground chain of comic emails called "2043 – Headlines of the Future", Chelsea Clinton is president and bans all smoking, at the same time Fidel Castro dies at age 112 (Castro in real life died at the age of 90 on November 25, 2016), meaning Americans would otherwise have been able to legally buy Cuban cigars. Also in the list of jokes, "George Z. Bush" (intended to be a futuristic descendant of George W. Bush and George H. W. Bush) says he will run in the 2044 election.
- At one point in the 2009 environmentalist docufiction The Age of Stupid, itself set in the year 2055, a series of voice clips from fictional newscasts of the future are played to chronicle the progressive ecological and humanitarian crisis faced by the world in the intervening time. In one, it is reported that "US President Chelsea Clinton" refused some otherwise unspecified "Africa's demands". Although nothing else is stated about her presidency, the voice clip plays while the 2020 year date is shown on screen.
- In the Fringe episode "Liberty", set in an alternate universe to the main one, she is announced on television as currently leading the polls in the Presidential race.

=== Hillary Clinton ===
- In a parallel universe featured in the Sliders Season One episode "The Weaker Sex" in which women held the positions of power and influence and men were treated like second class citizens, Hillary Clinton (played by Teresa Barnwell) was the incumbent president in 1995. Her husband, Bill Clinton, was the First Gentleman.
- Described in John Birmingham's Axis of Time novels as being an "uncompromising" president; served two terms and was martyred by a suicide bomber. A George W. Bush-class aircraft carrier, the U.S.S. Hillary Clinton (aka "The Big Hill", ship's motto "It Takes A Carrier"), was named for her.
- Portrayed as 46th president in the British comic 2000 AD (in the 1995 story Maniac 6). Ross Perot is her Secretary of State and Colin Powell her chief of staff.
- In the parallel universe depicted in the comic book newuniversal by Warren Ellis, Hillary Clinton was president in 2006. In this universe, the September 11, 2001 attacks never took place.
- In The Trial of Tony Blair, she was elected as the 44th President in 2008, succeeding George W. Bush.
- In The Execution Channel by Ken MacLeod, Hillary Clinton was elected as the 44th president in 2008, succeeding Al Gore. Gore had defeated George W. Bush in the 2000 election and was re-elected in 2004. The point explicitly made by the writer is that – with the September 11, 2001, attacks still happening with a Democrat in the White House – Gore and his successor Clinton would have undertaken an aggressive "war on terrorism" similar to that undertaken by George W. Bush in actual history, leading to an unstable, oppressive situation in the later part of the 21st century when the plot is set.
- In the alternate history novel 11/22/63 by Stephen King, Hillary Clinton was president in 2011 in the alternate timeline created by Jake Epping's prevention of the assassination of John F. Kennedy. She was first elected in 2004 after her husband Bill, the widely-seen shoo-in for the Democratic nomination, died of a heart attack at that year's national convention. Her presidency sees Maine become a province of Canada after a referendum held in 2005. Harry Dunning describes her presidency as 'not bad' but seriously hampered by constant earthquakes resulting from the temporal disruption caused by Epping.
- In the Not the White House Correspondents' Dinner TV special of Full Frontal with Samantha Bee, one segment shows host Samantha Bee watching a clip purported to come from a parallel universe where Hillary Clinton was elected as the 45th President in 2016, defeating Donald Trump. the segment, titled Woman in the High Castle (the title is a spoof of The Man in the High Castle based on the book of the same name, both use the concept of a parallel universe as a major plot point) features Bee watching the clip which revealed as footage of her alternate universe self hosting that universe's 2017 White House Correspondents' Dinner (the real Dinner occurred on the same date as the air date of the special) and as traditional for a host during the Dinner, the alternate universe Bee entertains the invitees by staging a comedy routine spoofing incumbent President Hillary Clinton (the incumbent president is traditionally expected to attend the dinner (which as the case in Woman in the High Castle) and takes the jokes about him/herself in good humor and later on, go up onto the stage him/self to make more jokes). The winner of the 2016 election in reality, Donald Trump did not attend any of the White House Correspondents' Dinners held during his Presidency (including the 2017 one) as he was unpopular with many of the White House Correspondents over not only his policies in office but uniquely also his general persona which many considered abhorrent. Trump was invited every year he was in office but never went as he considered the comedians performing as "mocking" him.
- In the novel Agency by William Gibson, Hillary Clinton defeats Donald Trump in the 2016 election.

=== George Clooney ===
- George Clooney is a former president in the episode "The Suite Smell of Excess" of The Suite Life of Zack & Cody. Zack and Cody Martin traveled to an alternate universe where everything had changed from their original world and where President Clooney was depicted on the quarter.

=== Schuyler Colfax ===
- In the chapter "The Murder of the Vice President" of the alternate history anthology Almost America by Steve Tally, Speaker of the House of Representatives Schuyler Colfax is elevated to President after both President Abraham Lincoln and Vice President Andrew Johnson are assassinated on April 14, 1865. To avenge the death of Lincoln, Colfax and congressional Radical Republicans impose a more punitive version of Reconstruction. This includes the trials and executions of the assassination conspirators (and people connected to them such as Junius Brutus Booth Jr., Samuel Mudd and Anna Surratt) and Confederate leaders such as Jefferson Davis, Alexander Stephens and Robert E. Lee; the trial in absentia and sentence of death against the exiled John C. Breckinridge; the dissolution of former Confederate states on the Mason-Dixon line and the absorption of their territories into Union states (such as Virginia into Maryland); and the imposition of military occupation in the South until 1914.

=== Calvin Coolidge ===
- In the short story "Fighting Bob" by Kristine Kathryn Rusch contained in the anthology Alternate Presidents edited by Mike Resnick, Calvin Coolidge lost the 1924 election to the Progressive Party candidate Robert M. La Follette, Sr. La Follette entered office as the 31st President on March 4, 1925. However, his term in office proved to be short-lived as he died on June 18, 1925 (as he did in real life). Burton K. Wheeler succeeded him as the 32nd President.
- In the alternate history novel series Southern Victory novel American Empire: The Center Cannot Hold, Calvin Coolidge was a Democratic politician in the early 20th century, with the Democrats becoming the major right-wing party in the United States following the defection of conservative Republicans during the disastrous presidency of James G. Blaine. He served as the Governor of Massachusetts in the 1920s and was elected to the presidency in 1932. He was the only man elected President of the United States to have never been inaugurated. A veteran of the Great War (1914–1917), Coolidge rose to prominence during his tenure as Governor of Massachusetts. In 1928, he was the Democratic Party's nominee for president. However, as United States had been immensely prosperous under the administration of Socialist President Upton Sinclair, Coolidge was readily portrayed as another regressive Democrat. Despite Coolidge's promises to keep the Confederate States of America in check, his lack of accomplishment outside of Massachusetts worked against him. Although he carried all six of the New England states (including his home and birth states of Massachusetts and Vermont), Kansas, Kentucky, Montana, Idaho, Nevada, and Houston (which split off from Texas after the Great War), he was defeated by the incumbent vice president, Socialist Hosea Blackford by a narrow margin. When Coolidge called Blackford to concede, however, he expressed his belief that the bull market would not last, and that Blackford would face a difficult presidency when it finally crashed. History proved Coolidge correct. The stock market crash came a year into Blackford's term. Blackford struggled unsuccessfully with the resulting depression, but the American people's faith in him and his party quickly eroded. Further sinking Blackford's presidency was the Pacific War with Japan, which broke out in 1932, just before elections. Against this backdrop, the Democrats nominated Coolidge as their candidate for a second time in 1932. Coolidge's platform of discontinuing Blackford's costly and ineffective economic programs and a vigorous prosecution of the Pacific War handily won him and his running mate Herbert Hoover the election. Unfortunately, Coolidge did not live to take office. President-elect Coolidge was in Washington, D.C., when he suffered a heart attack while shaving and died on January 5, 1933 (the same date as he died in real history). Coolidge's term was served by Hoover, who became the 31st president.

=== James M. Cox ===
- In the short story "A Fireside Chat" by Jack Nimersheim in the anthology Alternate Presidents edited by Mike Resnick, James M. Cox was elected president in 1920 after his Republican opponent Warren G. Harding died of a stroke. Before taking office, however, President-elect Cox was assassinated by an anti-League of Nations activist. Consequently, Vice President-elect Franklin D. Roosevelt was inaugurated as the 29th President on March 4, 1921.

=== Davy Crockett ===
- In the short story "Chickasaw Slave" by Judith Moffett in the anthology Alternate Presidents edited by Mike Resnick, Davy Crockett is elected as the 7th President in the 1828 presidential election after Andrew Jackson's image was tarnished by a land-dealing scandal. This later results in the Civil War occurring over the Compromise of 1850 and a different version of the Confederacy winning its independence in 1853.

=== Mario Cuomo ===
- Mario Cuomo is portrayed in the British comic 2000 AD (in the 1993 story Maniac 5) as vice president to President Al Gore, and succeeds to the presidency when Gore is killed by aliens during the Fourth World War. Cuomo is pressured by his advisers into taking drastic measures to win the war, against his better judgment, and shoots himself in remorse. His successor is seen but not named.
- Mario Cuomo is also President in the Stoney Compton novel Russian Amerika, although the US in that book is limited to New England, the Mid Atlantic States, and the Upper Midwest and the capital is Columbus, Ohio.

=== George Armstrong Custer ===
- In the alternate history short story "How the South Preserved the Union" by Ralph Roberts in the anthology Alternate Presidents edited by Mike Resnick, George Custer was elected president in or prior to 1888. He is named as the victor at the Battle of the Little Big Horn (June 25–26, 1876).
- In the novel "1882: Custer in Chains" by Robert Conroy, George Custer survives and wins the Battle of Little Big Horn. As a result, he is eventually elected president in 1880 and provokes a war with Spain after a group of Americans on a ship headed for Cuba in massacred.
- Much like in "1882: Custer in Chains" above, in the short story "Bloodstained Ground" by Brian Thomsen in the anthology Alternate Generals edited by Harry Turtledove, Roland J. Green and Martin H. Greenberg, George Custer survives and wins the Battle of Little Big Horn with him eventually being elected as the President of the United States, only to later be assassinated. Following Custer's death, journalist Samuel Clemens is assigned to write a memorial, but his interviews with Custer's nephew Henry Armstrong Reed and Captain Marcus Reno reveal some sickening facts about Custer.

== D ==
=== Howard Dean ===
- The Unbreakable Kimmy Schmidt episode "Sliding Van Doors" includes a scene in an alternate 2007 where Howard Dean is president and The Purge is legal.

=== James Dean ===
- Dean is president in The Monument Mythos. Dean is within the alternate reality, titled The "Deanverse" (Named because of Dean's term as the 37th President of The United States as opposed to Richard Nixon). In this reality, he did not die in a car crash in 1955. Dean wins the 1968 election due to a successful advertising campaign calling for the end of the Vietnam War. Dean is subject to many Southern hate groups, known as the "Anti Dean Association" that believed Dean was The Devil in disguise. The Association caused many terroristic attacks, such as cutting down power lines and hijacking sirens, causing millions to go deaf. Through the newly founded "United States Department of Technology", and the use of surgical androids, the mass deafness caused by the attack was cured, eventually eradicating deafness. He has an affinity for racing cars.

=== Jefferson Davis ===
- In the alternate history novel The Probability Broach by L. Neil Smith in which the United States became a libertarian state in 1794 after a successful Whiskey Rebellion and George Washington being overthrown and executed by firing squad for treason, Jefferson Davis served as the 10th President of the North American Confederacy from 1848 to 1852. He was succeeded by Gifford Swansea, who served as the 11th president from 1852 to 1856.

=== Eugene V. Debs ===
- In the alternate history anthology Back in the USSA by Kim Newman and Eugene Byrne, Eugene Debs and his followers in the Socialist Party of America overthrew the oppressive regime of President Charles Foster Kane with the storming of the White House on July 4, 1917, serving as a parallel of Vladimir Lenin. He became the first President of the United Socialist States of America (USSA). After his death in 1926, he was succeeded by Al Capone, a parallel to Joseph Stalin.

=== Thomas E. Dewey ===
- In "No Other Choice" by Barbara Delaplace contained in the anthology Alternate Presidents edited by Mike Resnick, Thomas Dewey defeats a seriously ill Franklin D. Roosevelt in 1944 to become the 33rd President, and eventually decided to drop the atomic bomb on Tokyo rather than Hiroshima, leading to the deaths of eight million Japanese civilians. His vice president was John W. Bricker, though Dewey came to believe that Bricker's temperament was better suited to peacetime than wartime.
- "The More Things Change..." by Glen E. Cox, also contained in the anthology Alternate Presidents edited by Mike Resnick, tells the story of the 1948 election in reverse, with underdog Dewey eventually defeating the early overwhelming favorite, the incumbent Harry S. Truman, by playing to anti-communist fears. He therefore becomes the 34th President with Earl Warren as his vice president. The story contains a reference to the famously inaccurate banner headline "Dewey Defeats Truman". Given that it was regarded as a foregone conclusion that Dewey would lose the election, the front-page headline of the Chicago Tribune on November 3, 1948, erroneously reads "Truman Defeats Dewey". The front cover of the anthology depicts a grinning Dewey proudly holding up the relevant edition of the Chicago Tribune in the same manner as Truman did in real life.
- In The Trinity Paradox by Kevin J. Anderson and Doug Beason, the well-intentioned interference of a time traveller caused the boosting of Nazi Germany's nuclear program, and New York City was devastated in June 1944 by a radioactive dust missile fired from a German U-boat – with the result that voters lost confidence in Roosevelt and Thomas Dewey won the 1944 election with John W. Bricker as his vice president. In his term, President Dewey instituted the policy of regularly using nuclear arms in whatever war the US was involved in, first against Germany and later against the Soviet Union and North Korea.
- In Harry Turtledove's Settling Accounts: In at the Death, the final novel in the Southern Victory alternate history series, Thomas Dewey was a Democrat who was elected as the 34th President in 1944 with Harry S. Truman as his vice president. Dewey rose to fame first as a prosecutor and subsequently served as the Governor of New York during the Second Great War. An able and very popular politician, Dewey became the obvious choice to challenge the incumbent Socialist President Charles W. La Follette. Despite the fact that La Follette had recently led the country to victory over the Confederate States of America and its allies in the Second Great War (1941–1944), Dewey successfully ran on a platform that the Socialists had allowed the Confederacy to regain its strength under Jake Featherston. At his inauguration on February 1, 1945, President Dewey pledged to continue US occupation of the CS with the intention of re-integrating the southern states back into the Union, even though over 82 years had passed since the Confederate States had won its independence in the War of Secession (1861–1862) with the support of the United Kingdom and France. He pledged to continue La Follette's policy of racial equality in the armed services. Furthermore, he proposed a continued partnership with the United States' traditional ally, the German Empire, to police the world and prevent the spread of superbomb technology to their former enemies, the Russian Empire and the Empire of Japan. Given that it was widely believed that Dewey would lose the election, the front-page headline of the November 8, 1944, edition of the Chicago Tribune inaccurately read "La Follette Defeats Dewey". Vice President-elect Truman was photographed holding up a copy of the paper by the media. Dewey was elected at the age of 42, tying the first Socialist president Upton Sinclair (who was elected to the first of two terms in 1920, defeating the Democratic incumbent Theodore Roosevelt) as the youngest President in US history. He was also the first president born in the 20th century whereas Sinclair was the first born after the War of Secession.
- In Franz Ferdinand Lives! A World Without World War I (2014) by Richard Ned Lebow in which neither World War I nor World War II took place, Thomas Dewey was elected in 1944 and served two terms. He was preceded by Franklin D. Roosevelt.
- In the alternate history video game Turning Point: Fall of Liberty, Thomas E. Dewey served as the 34th President of the United States after he defeated Harry S. Truman in the 1948 election. After Nazi Germany invaded the Eastern Seaboard of the United States in 1953, he and his vice president Haley resign and let Speaker of the House James Edward Stevenson become the president of a new Pro-Nazi puppet government.
- In the alternate history novella Bring the Jubilee by Ward Moore, a Confederate victory in the War of Southern Independence is generally disastrous for the United States. In domestic politics, it results in rampant corruption and the replacement of the Democratic and Republican parties with the right-leaning Whigs and the left-leaning Populists following a series of unable Democratic and Republican administrations. The Whigs accept the status quo, wishing to turn the United States into a neo-colony for the world's great powers, while the Populists wish to ameliorate the harsher aspects of the US economy such as indentureships and the clauses of the 1864 Treaty of Reading, the American-Confederate peace agreement. The Whig candidate for the 1940 Presidential Election is Thomas E. Dewey who defeats his Populist rival Jennings Lewis, an outcome that was favoured by the Grand Army terrorist organisation due to Dewey's more predictable agenda. However, due to political corruption, the presidency has diminished in power in comparison to the House Majority Speaker.
- In the book The Calculating Stars, Thomas E. Dewey is mentioned as having defeated Harry S. Truman in 1948. Dewey is the incumbent President in 1952 (when the book takes place) when an asteroid strike kills him and most of his Cabinet.
- Dewey is president in The New Order: Last Days of Europe. Dewey was the 33rd president of the United States from January 20, 1941 to January 20, 1949. He took office following the presidency of Franklin D. Roosevelt and was succeeded by Dwight D. Eisenhower.

=== Bob Dole ===
- In the alternate history short story "Hillary Orbits Venus" by Pamela Sargent, Bob Dole was elected president in 1984 and 1988. He was preceded by John Glenn and succeeded by Bill Clinton. By 1998, he and Glenn were the only living former Presidents.
- In the alternate history novel The Sky People, Bob Dole was president at the time of the first American settlement on Venus in 1982.

=== Shaggy 2 Dope ===
- In the internet fiction series Homestuck, American rapper Shaggy 2 Dope is elected as dual President on an alternate Earth along with Violent J, the other member of the pair's hip hop duo Insane Clown Posse. Running on the Juggalo Party ticket, Dope and J would be the first and last Juggalo Presidents of the United States. This occurs in 2024 CE, the last free election the world would ever see, because the pair are only puppet rulers being manipulated by an evil alien space empress.

=== Stephen A. Douglas ===
- In the short story "How the South Preserved the Union" by Ralph Roberts included in the anthology Alternate Presidents edited by Mike Resnick, David Rice Atchison, the President pro tempore of the United States Senate and a prominent pro-slavery activist, became the 13th President following the deaths of his predecessor Zachary Taylor and Vice President Millard Fillmore in a carriage accident. Several months after President Atchison's accession, the American Civil War broke out on April 17, 1849, with the secession of Massachusetts from the Union and the Second Battle of Lexington and Concord, from which the rebelling abolitionists, who styled themselves as the New Minutemen, emerged victorious. New Hampshire and Vermont seceded shortly thereafter and were soon followed by the rest of New England, New York, New Jersey and Pennsylvania. The seceding Northeastern states banded together to form the New England Confederacy with Daniel Webster as its first and only president and the revolutionary abolitionist John Brown as the commander of its army. The war came to an end in 1855, two years after President Atchison had issued a proclamation promising that any slave who fought in the United States Army would be granted his freedom following the end of the war and that any factory slave who worked satisfactorily would be granted his or her freedom after the war and would be paid for that work from then onwards. Stephen Douglas eventually succeeded Atchison as the 14th President after being elected in 1860 and introduced the Civil Rights Act 1861 which brought an end to slavery in the United States in its entirety. The 1861 Act also declared all men, irrespective of their color, equal and granted all African American (which by then had replaced "Negro" as the preferred term for black people) men the right to vote. However, certain veterans had already enjoyed voting rights since the end of war. Several years later, the right to vote was granted to all women.
- In the short story "Lincoln's Charge" by Bill Fawcett contained in the anthology Alternate Presidents edited by Mike Resick, Stephen Douglas was elected as the 16th President in 1860. His vice president was Herschel Vespasian Johnson. Douglas is able to live longer than he did in real life, as he still alive at the end of the story and died on June 3, 1861, in reality. In the hope of avoiding warfare, Douglas attempted to reach a compromise with the Southern representatives in the Congress. The Manumission Act of 1862 was intended to preserve the Union by freeing the slaves over a period of ten years, giving everyone time to adjust. While Douglas heralded the law as another great compromise analogous to the Compromise of 1850, the Southern representatives formed the Confederate States of America and began arming for war. After the outbreak of the American Civil War in 1862, President Douglas was fearful of further provoking the South and did not introduce conscription as the Confederacy. Consequently, the professional though much smaller Union Army was overwhelmed and nearly destroyed by the Confederate States Army at Manassas Creek in Virginia in 1862. It took the United States over a year to recover from this disaster, creating a period of false peace. Although everyone in the North initially welcomed it, the false peace gave both sides time to build their armies as well as providing an opportunity for the United Kingdom to decide to support the Confederacy with the full backing of the British Empire's diplomacy and trade. Douglas continued to negotiate with the Confederacy in an attempt to reach a compromise, failing to understand that every day lost meant another victory for the South. The failed Republican candidate Abraham Lincoln accepted a commission as the commanding general of the Illinois Militia in the Union Army. General Lincoln's own commanding officer was Brigadier General Ulysses S. Grant. Lincoln believed that he would have been able to prevent the war if he had been elected or, failing that, would have shown the kind of decisive leadership of which Douglas was seemingly incapable, built a real army and crushed the Confederacy before they were able to build a large army of their own. Shortly after leading his troops into battle for the first time in 1863, General Lincoln was shot and killed by a Confederate sniper while still on horseback. Although the story ends with Lincoln's death, it is heavily implied that the Confederacy will eventually win the war with the support of the British and establish an independent nation.

=== Frederick Douglass ===
- In the alternate history novel The Probability Broach by L. Neil Smith in which the United States became a libertarian state in 1794 after a successful Whiskey Rebellion and George Washington being overthrown and executed by firing squad for treason, Frederick Douglass served as the 16th President of the North American Confederacy from 1888 to 1892.
- In Terry Bisson's novel Fire on the Mountain, John Brown's raid on Harpers Ferry succeeds and precipitates an all-out slave rebellion throughout the South. Frederick Douglass, full of remorse for not having joined the original raid, goes southward and joins Brown's growing army of rebel slaves. Brown does not survive the years of war which follow. It is Frederick Douglass along with Harriet Tubman who carry on the war to a victorious conclusion, eventually detaching the Deep South and making of it the predominantly Black nation of Nova Africa, and defeating the last ditch attempt of die hard Unionist Abraham Lincoln to raise a new army and restore Nova Africa's territory to the Union. Douglass and Tubman are remembered by posterity as respectively the Founding Father and Founding Mother of the new nation.

=== Michael Dukakis ===
- In the short story "Dukakis and the Aliens" by Robert Sheckley in the anthology Alternate Presidents edited by Mike Resnick, Michael Dukakis won the 1988 election and became the 41st President, defeating Vice President George H. W. Bush. His own vice president was Lloyd Bentsen. President Dukakis was eventually revealed to be an enemy alien attempting to infiltrate Dulce Base. "Friendly" aliens along with the Men in Black have to adjust the timeline to ensure that Bush was elected the 41st president, instead.
- In the setting for the role-playing game Shadowrun, Dukakis became the 41st President after VP George H. W. Bush was indicted in the Iran-Contra affair in 1987, thus becoming ineligible to run for the presidency in 1988. His vice-president was Lloyd Bentsen. Dukakis Lost the 1992 election to Jeffrey Lynch (R).
