= List of fictional United States presidencies of historical figures (H–J) =

Lists of fictional presidents of the United States
A–B	C–D	E–F
G–H	I–J	K–M
N–R	S–T	U–Z
Fictional presidencies of historical figures
A–B	C–D	E–G
H–J	K–L	M–O
P–R	S–U	V–Z

The following is a list of real or historical people who have been portrayed as President of the United States in fiction, although they did not hold the office in real life. This is done either as an alternate history scenario, or occasionally for humorous purposes. Also included are actual U.S. presidents with a fictional presidency at a different time and/or under different circumstances than the one in actual history.

== H ==
=== Hannibal Hamlin ===
- In the alternate history short story "Must and Shall" by Harry Turtledove, Hannibal Hamlin becomes the 17th president after his predecessor Abraham Lincoln was killed by a Confederate army sharpshooter at the Battle of Fort Stevens on July 12, 1864, while observing General Jubal Early's attack. Hamlin, who had retired to Bangor, Maine after being passed over for renomination as vice president in favor of Andrew Johnson, received an emergency telegram to summoned him out of Bangor to Washington, D.C. to assume the presidency shortly after Lincoln's death. Nine days later on July 21, Hamlin becomes the 17th president and at his inaugural speech, he promises severe retribution on the Confederate States after the Great Rebellion ends, even using Lincoln's death as justification for the oppressive peace. This involved the hanging of Jefferson Davis, Robert E. Lee, Joseph E. Johnston, and other Confederate leaders for high treason, a harsh occupation of the rebellious states, the destruction of their economy and further racial division due to the promotion of blacks to important offices, leading to great animosity between the inhabitants of the North and South. The complete military control of the former Confederacy by the U.S., and the continued rebelliousness of white Southerners, continued until at least 1942 – at which time Nazi Germany smuggled weapons into the South to stir up revolt and distract the U.S. government.
- In If the South Had Won the Civil War by MacKinlay Kantor, Hannibal Hamlin became president in 1863, after the Confederates achieved a decisive victory and Robert E. Lee's troops occupied Washington, D.C. Abraham Lincoln, held prisoner in Richmond, sent northwards a letter announcing his resignation, making Hamlin the new president. It fell to President Hamlin to complete the bitter work of negotiating the border with the newly independent CSA. The most bitter pill he had to swallow was to concede the permanent loss of Washington and its transformation into the Confederate capital – made inevitable by Maryland joining the Confederacy (as did Kentucky). Hamlin's main achievement was the retention of West Virginia in the Union, as well as preventing pro-Confederate militias in Missouri from detaching that State. In the debate over the location of the new US Capital, Hamlin strongly opposed the proposal of making Philadelphia the capital – which would have alienated all the states west of the Alleghenies – and supported the finally accepted compromise of Columbus, Ohio, which is renamed "Columbia". As he did not stand for re-election in 1864, Hamlin did not actually get to take residence in the new capital at Columbus, which was only made ready years later.
- In Underground Airlines by Ben H. Winters, the assassination of President-elect Abraham Lincoln led to the adoption of a modified version of the Crittenden Compromise, with slavery being preserved into the twenty-first century in the 'Hard Four' states: Alabama, Louisiana, Mississippi and a unified Carolina. Presumably, Hannibal Hamlin as Vice-president-elect would have been sworn in as president as a result of Lincoln's assassination.

=== Winfield Scott Hancock ===
- In the alternate history story "Patriot's Dream" by Tappan King contained in the anthology Alternate Presidents edited by Mike Resnick, Winfield Scott Hancock was Samuel J. Tilden's running mate in 1876, defeating Rutherford B. Hayes. Consequently, Tilden became the 19th president with Hancock as his vice president. Although they were elected as Democrats, they later founded the reformist Liberal Party. After serving two terms as vice president, Hancock was elected as the 20th president in 1884 and went on to be re-elected in 1888. His vice president was Grover Cleveland, who won the Liberal Party's presidential nomination in 1892 and was widely expected to defeat his Democratic opponent James G. Blaine. Cleveland's running mate was Susan B. Anthony.

=== Warren G. Harding ===
- In the short story "A Fireside Chat" by Jack Nimersheim contained in the anthology Alternate Presidents edited by Mike Resnick, Warren G. Harding died of a stroke during the 1920 election campaign. The election was eventually won by the Democratic candidate James M. Cox with Franklin D. Roosevelt as his running mate. Five weeks after the election, however, President-elect Cox was assassinated by an anti-League of Nations activist, meaning that Roosevelt took office as the 29th president on March 4, 1921. Shortly after the Nazi Party rose to power as a result of the Bürgerbräu Putsch in 1922, President Roosevelt and the Chancellor of Germany, Adolf Hitler, established an alliance in order to maintain the balance of power.

=== W. Averell Harriman ===
- President Harriman, mentioned in The Number of the Beast by Robert A. Heinlein, is presumably W. Averell Harriman. In reading an almanac from our universe, it is noted that Dwight D. Eisenhower served one of his terms in office (meaning he either served from 1949 to 1957 or 1957–1965).

=== Kamala Harris ===
- In the play The 47th by Mike Bartlett, Kamala Harris (played by Tamara Tunie) becomes the 47th president after President Joe Biden resigns. After Trump supporters disrupt the first presidential debate between Harris and Donald Trump, they enforce mob rule throughout the United States, with Harris having Trump arrested and briefly imprisoned but ultimately releasing him out of fear that it would make him a martyr. With Trump dying a week before the election from injuries he sustained during a car crash, it is suggested that it may have been orchestrated by Harris, with liberal reporter Charlie Takahashi, who had been blinded through torture by Trump supporters during the violence, persuading her to do so to end the violence.

=== Benjamin Harrison ===
- In the short story "Love Our Lockwood" by Janet Kagan contained in the anthology Alternate Presidents edited by Mike Resnick, Benjamin Harrison lost the 1888 election to Belva Ann Lockwood, who became the 23rd president as well as the first woman to hold the office. He was once again the Republican presidential candidate in 1892 and was defeated on that occasion by Grover Cleveland, who became the 24th president, having previously served as the 22nd president from 1885 to 1889.
- In the alternate history series Southern Victory novel How Few Remain by Harry Turtledove, Benjamin Harrison served as the Secretary of War in the cabinet of Republican president James G. Blaine from 1881 to 1885. He oversaw the US military during the Second Mexican War (1881–1882) and consequently shouldered much of the blame for the United States' defeat by the Confederate States of America, the United Kingdom and France. As a result, the Republicans became an ineffectual centrist third party, with their right wing defecting to the Democrats and their left wing establishing the Socialist Party, and the Republicans never again winning the presidency. He was the grandson of William Henry Harrison, who had served as the 9th President of the United States from March 4 to April 4, 1841, as a member of the Whig Party.

=== William Henry Harrison ===
- William Henry Harrison, the actual 9th President of the United States, had an alternate presidency in Tom Wicker's "His Accidency". The Point of Departure is Harrison's apparently trivial decision to wear a hat and a coat to his inauguration on March 4, 1841, and cut in half the inauguration speech he prepared, delivered in the open on a cold and rainy day. Thereby, Harrison avoided the pneumonia which in actual history killed him a month later, and served out his full term. Thus, Vice President John Tyler never ascended to the presidency. In actual history Tyler – a Virginian – had actively promoted Texas, a slave state, joining the Union; conversely, in Wicker's alternate history the surviving Harrison, a Northerner, was lukewarm to the idea. As a result, the Texans accepted the offer of Mexico to recognize Texas provided that it remained independent and did not join the US. Texas indeed remained the Lone Star Republic and did not join the US. The Mexican War did not break out and thus California, Arizona, and New Mexico remained part of Mexico. Harrison's care for his personal health turned out to have seriously derailed the Manifest Destiny.

=== Gary Hart ===
- In First Among Equals by Jeffrey Archer (first published in 1984), Gary Hart was elected president in 1988, presumably as a result of Ronald Reagan's failure to negotiate arms reductions with the Soviet Union. With Margaret Thatcher's third tenure as prime minister already weakened by the election of a hung parliament and the continuation of her Conservative government in the minority, Hart's social and economic policy agendas undermine the position of the Thatcher ministry further, forcing her to call an early election in 1989, which Labour wins albeit with a narrow parliamentary majority.
- Gary Hart is the president from 1981 to 1989 in an alternate world inhabited by Susannah Dean, Eddie Dean, and Jake Chambers at the end of Stephen King's novel The Dark Tower VII: The Dark Tower. Eddie mentions that Hart was elected in a landslide in the 1980 election after almost dropping out due to the "Monkey Business business." In real life, Hart ran for president in 1984 and 1988 (not 1980 and 1984), and the Monkey Business scandal happened in 1987 (not 1980). In this alternate timeline, Ronald Reagan never entered politics.
- In the alternate history novella trilogy Then Everything Changed by Jeff Greenfield, Gerald Ford wins the 1976 election after clarifying his statement that "there is no Soviet domination of Eastern Europe and there never will be under a Ford administration" during the second presidential debate, albeit winning the electoral votes of Ohio and Mississippi to achieve a narrow victory of 272 to 266 in the Electoral College and losing the popular vote to Jimmy Carter by around 1,500,000. In 1980, Gary Hart defeats Ted Kennedy for the Democratic nomination and ultimately defeats Republican candidate Ronald Reagan in the general election. Dale Bumpers served as Hart's running mate, later becoming Vice President and Hart's "point man" with Congress. Hart's election victory was largely attributed to Ford's unpopularity, public backlash against economic downturn, the Republicans' twelve-year incumbency in the White House and John B. Anderson's decision against contesting the election as a third-party candidate. Hart nominated as his attorney general Rose Bird, the first woman to hold one of the top four Cabinet posts, keeping her in mind as a candidate for a Supreme Court vacancy. Early into his first term, following the announcement of a strike by air traffic controllers, Hart was discovered having an affair with White House intern Serena Brown by Assistant White House Chief of Staff Hillary Rodham.
- In the alternate history science fiction series For All Mankind, Gary Hart is the president from 1985 to 1993, succeeding Ronald Reagan. It is mentioned through newsreel footage that Hart won re-election in 1988 by defeating the Republican nominee, Pat Robertson, in a landslide. His presidency coincided with the Space Boom in which the lowering costs of space travel allowed countries other than the United States, the Soviet Union and their respective allies and private companies to engage in space exploration. His presidency also witnessed the breaking of the nuclear fusion barrier (which Hart endorsed despite opposition from mining unions), the Iraqi invasion of Kuwait (which Hart refused to intervene in), the election of Communist Arnoldo Martinez Verdugo as President of Mexico, and the Polaris space hotel disaster (which resulted in the collapse of the Polaris corporation). He was succeeded as president by Republican Ellen Wilson, one of America's first female astronauts and US senator for Texas, after his vice president Al Gore was defeated in the Democratic primaries by challenger Bill Clinton.

=== Rutherford B. Hayes ===
- In the alternate history short story "Patriot's Dream" by Tappan Wright King contained in the anthology Alternate Presidents edited by Mike Resnick, Rutherford Hayes lost the 1876 Presidential Election to Democratic candidate Samuel J. Tilden.
- In the alternate history novel The Guns of the South by Harry Turtledove, Rutherford Hayes was one of the commanders of the United States Army in the Eastern Theater during the Second American Revolution. His brigade of Ohioans was part of the Union army of between six and seven thousand men under the command of General George Crook. On May 9, 1864, Crook's army attacked Confederate forces under General Albert Gallatin Jenkins just south of Cloyd's Mountain, Virginia. Though the Unions greatly outnumbered their opponents, the Confederates were armed with type of "repeating" rifle, called the AK-47. With these guns, the Confederate troops were able to hold their position, and the Union troops were forced to retreat to the north. Hayes ended up getting killed during the battle.

=== Charlton Heston ===
- In the alternate history Dark Future novel series by Kim Newman, Charlton "Big Chuck" Heston succeeded Spiro Agnew as president. He was himself succeeded by Oliver North.
- In a parallel universe featured in the Lois & Clark: The New Adventures of Superman Season Two episode "Tempus, Anyone?", Charlton Heston was the incumbent president in 1996.

=== Paris Hilton ===
- Paris Hilton was portrayed as president in an alternate universe on The Suite Life of Zack & Cody episode The Suite Smell of Excess. She makes it illegal to weigh more than 108 pounds. Hilton herself once joked in a famous YouTube video that she would run for president in the 2008 election, after John McCain used footage of her to negatively portray Barack Obama as a mere celebrity.

=== Ernest Hollings ===
- Ernest Hollings is president in an alternate reality briefly visited by Father Callahan in Stephen King's novel The Dark Tower V: Wolves of the Calla. Although the real Hollings sought the candidacy in the 1984 election, in Wolves of the Calla he was elected in 1980.

=== Herbert Hoover ===
- In the short story "Truth, Justice, and the American Way" by Lawrence Watt-Evans contained in Alternate Presidents edited by Mike Resnick, Herbert Hoover defeated his Democratic opponent Franklin D. Roosevelt in the 1932 election as a result of Al Smith, the Democratic nominee in 1928, running as a third party candidate and splitting the Democratic party. On the advice of his Secretary of State Henry L. Stimson, Hoover went to war with Japan in 1934. After defeating Roosevelt in 1936, Stimson became the 32nd president and, under his leadership, the United States emerged victorious from the war. However, President Stimson was criticized for not crushing Japan entirely by invading the Home Islands. In 1938, Adolf Hitler was overthrown and killed by a cabal of generals over the invasion of Czechoslovakia and Hermann Göring succeeded him as the leader of the Nazi Party, continuing to serve in that position until at least 1953. Due to the survival of Nazi Germany, totalitarianism and antisemitism grew stronger across the world well into the 1950s.
- In Harry Turtledove's Southern Victory alternate history series (American Empire: The Center Cannot Hold and American Empire: The Victorious Opposition), Herbert Hoover was initially elected vice president in 1932 on the Democratic ticket with Calvin Coolidge. Despite the prosperity of the country under Socialist President Upton Sinclair after the Great War (1914–1917), the fortunes of the country had fallen dramatically under Sinclair's successor, Hosea Blackford. The strong stock market which had characterized most of the 1920s had finally crashed in 1929. President Blackford was unable to deal satisfactorily with the resulting depression. In 1932, the United States found itself in the Pacific War against the Empire of Japan. While the war was largely a stalemate on the ocean, Japan ran a successful air-raid on the city of Los Angeles on the very day that Blackford was in-town for a rally. Thus, when Hoover was nominated to be Coolidge's running mate, the Democrats were in the strongest position they had been in for over a decade. Coolidge defeated Blackford handily. However, Coolidge died on January 5, 1933, of a heart attack, less than a month before he was to take office on February 1, and so Vice President-elect Hoover became the 31st president in his stead. Although Hoover was a Democrat, his Secretary of War was Franklin D. Roosevelt, a lifelong Socialist politician in spite of being a relative of staunch Democrat Theodore Roosevelt. Despite some of the initial optimism expressed by the voters, Hoover quickly proved a disappointment. His complete contempt for "paternalism" in the federal government rendered him just as ill-equipped to handle the economic depression as Blackford had been. He made this opinion known when Colonel Abner Dowling, the then-military governor of Utah, proposed a make-work plan for the state. Hoover flatly refused, despite the fact that the jobless rate in Utah was further exacerbating that already-precarious situation. This stance led the voters to return the Socialists to Congress in 1934. Hoover's handling of foreign affairs also frustrated many of his supporters in the military. While he continued the policy of rearmament begun by Blackford, the Pacific War ended inconclusively in 1934. After Jake Featherston and the Freedom Party came to power in the Confederate States of America, Hoover proved indecisive in his dealings with the United States' long-time enemy. When Featherston pressed for permission to arm more troops to suppress black uprisings, Hoover (after a period of vacillation) acquiesced, justifying his decision by citing his concerns about "radical" elements among the black Confederate community, and naively concluding that Featherston would not use the increased military against the United States. While Hoover did stand strong against Featherston on the rebellious states of Kentucky and Houston which the United States had taken from the Confederate States following the Great War, it was too little, too late. Growing dissatisfaction with Hoover led to his defeat in 1936 at the hands of Socialist Al Smith and his running mate Charles W. La Follette, who became the 32nd president. One of Hoover's last official duties included acting as pallbearer at his predecessor Hosea Blackford's state funeral, as did former president Sinclair.
- In the alternate history short story "Joe Steele" by Harry Turtledove, Hoover's failure to end the United States' downward spiral into the Great Depression during his term led to his defeat in the 1932 election at the hands of Congressman Joe Steele of California, who became the 32nd president. Hoover won only 59 electoral votes from Connecticut, Delaware, Maine, New Hampshire, Pennsylvania and Vermont and would become the last Republican elected to the presidency, as President Steele slowly but surely built up the powers of his office until he was effectively the dictator of the United States. Steele was ultimately elected to six terms from 1932 to 1952, dying only six weeks into his sixth term on March 5, 1953. He was succeeded by his vice president John Nance Garner, who became the 33rd president at the age of 84. However, he was overthrown and executed almost immediately by J. Edgar Hoover, who proved to be even more tyrannical than Steele.
- In the 2015 alternate history novel "Joe Steele", which is an expansion of the short-story of the same name, Hoover's role in the novel is slightly larger than in the short story. It is mentioned that the fundamental difference between him and Steele could be seen in Steele's inauguration on March 4, 1933. President Hoover and his wife, Lou, wore refined (if dated) clothing that suggested their "importance" to the audience. Steele and his wife, Betty, each dressed tastefully, but in clothing the average person might be able to afford. During the 1936 presidential election, former president Hoover sought the Republican nomination, but he lost to Alf Landon, who in turn would lose the election in a landslide to Steele.

=== J. Edgar Hoover ===
- Portrayed as president in the Red Dwarf episode "Tikka to Ride". When the Red Dwarf crew inadvertently prevented the assassination of John F. Kennedy (having travelled back in time at the insistence of Dave Lister to replace the crew's supply of curries), he was impeached in a sex scandal (having shared a mistress with Mafia boss Sam Giancana) in 1964. J. Edgar Hoover was forced to run for president by the Mafia, who blackmailed him with evidence that he was a cross-dresser. In return for unrestricted Mafia cocaine trafficking, Hoover allowed the Soviet Union to set up a nuclear base in Cuba, resulting in widespread panic, the abandonment of major American cities, the increasing likelihood of nuclear conflict and a probable Soviet victory in the Space Race due to a demoralized America. Hoover's presidency was erased when Kennedy commits suicide in Dallas in 1963 (by shooting his past self on the grassy knoll as the car passes through), restoring the timeline (with the future Kennedy fading out of existence due to him killing his past self).
- In the Sliders Second Two episode "Time Again and World", the group arrives in a parallel universe in which the United States exists in a state of martial law. After the assassination of John F. Kennedy by Julius and Ethel Rosenberg in 1963, J. Edgar Hoover succeeded him as the 36th president, serving for 22 years until his death in 1985, implemented martial law and amended the Constitution, excising most of the Bill of Rights. In tribute to Hoover, all police officers wear skirts instead of pants. In that alternate dimension, the prison on Alcatraz Island is a fully functioning penitentiary where the most dangerous political prisoners are kept, including civil rights activists Martin Luther King Jr. and Robert F. Kennedy as well as loud, out-spoken comedian Sam Kinison.
- Hoover also was president in one of many alternate realities mentioned in Richard Bowes' From the Files of the Time Rangers. He is briefly mentioned as being President in the 1940s; how he became president or what happens to him is not revealed in the novel.
- Another dictatorial J. Edgar Hoover, in Harry Turtledove's alternate history short story "Joe Steele", got to power earlier, in 1953 – having won a bloody power struggle between new president John Nance Garner and Vince "The Hammer" Scriabin (Vyacheslav Molotov) following the death of President Joe Steele in March 1953 – an avatar of none other than Joseph Stalin, whose parents in this timeline emigrated to the US making him an American citizen (and eventually an American dictator). Hoover was the head of Steele's secret police, putting him in good position to become the next dictator-president, and proving even more brutal than Steele-Stalin.
- In the 2015 alternate history novel "Joe Steele", also by Turtledove, which is an expansion of the short-story of the same name, Hoover's role is the same as it is in the short-story up until Steele's death. When Steele died in March 1953, Vice President John Nance Garner ascended to the presidency. While he quickly exiled Lazar Kagan and Stas Mikoian, Vince Scriabin refused to go. Garner also secured the resignation of the entire cabinet, save for Secretary of State Dean Acheson and Secretary of War George Marshall. Scriabin tapped into the remaining clout he had in the Senate. Subsequently, Acheson died in a plane crash. A week later Marshall was about to give a speech, when he was poisoned, turned blue and keeled over. Despite there being several doctors on hand, Marshall died from the poisoning. Garner figured out quickly that someone was moving against him, which he confided in Charlie Sullivan, who'd joined the administration as a speechwriter in 1939. Sullivan accused Scriabin, but also reminded Garner that J. Edgar Hoover was also another likely enemy. He suggested that Garner replace his guard detail, almost exclusively GBI agents, with soldiers. No sooner had Garner resolved to do all this than he was informed that the House had introduced legislation to impeach Garner for high crimes and misdemeanors, and suspected Scriabin's hand at work again. Garner took steps to try to slow down the impeachment process. He issued an executive order eliminating the restricted zone for former wreckers, an act criticized by Hoover. Moreover, the leaders of the impeachment drive were unmoved. The death of Scriabin, who was hit by a car, also did little to halt the impeachment. In the end the House passed three articles of impeachment, and the case went to the Senate, which voted overwhelmingly for conviction. The following day, J. Edgar Hoover, claiming that Congress was attempting to arrogate the powers of the executive to themselves, took temporary executive authority as Director of the United States. He ordered the citizens to follow the local authorities, outlawed assemblies of ten people or more, and arrested Congressional leaders "responsible" for the current state of affairs. He also cleared out the remaining government employees who'd served under Steele and Garner, including Charlie Sullivan. A few months later, a bomb exploded inside GBI headquarters, killing 26 people. Hoover had left just half an hour before. The GBI claimed a relative of a Representative who'd voted against impeaching Garner was responsible, and in response, Hoover clamped down further on Congress.

=== John Hospers ===
- In the alternate history novel The Probability Broach by L. Neil Smith in which the United States became a libertarian state after a successful Whiskey Rebellion and the overthrowing and execution of George Washington by firing squad for treason in 1794, John Hospers served as the 25th president of the North American Confederacy from 1972 to 1984.

=== Cordell Hull ===
- In the alternate history novel Worldwar: Striking the Balance by Harry Turtledove, Cordell Hull served as the Secretary of State from 1933 to 1944 under President Franklin D. Roosevelt. He held this office during World War II (1939 to 1942) as well as after the Race's Conquest Fleet invaded Earth on June 5, 1942. Given that Vice President Henry A. Wallace was killed when the Raced dropped an atomic bomb in Seattle in 1944, Hull became second in the line of succession to the presidency. When Roosevelt died later that year, Hull became the 33rd President of the United States. At 72, he was the oldest man to ever serve as president. He selected General George Marshall to replace him as secretary of state. As the Race presence on American soil had made Congressional elections impossible to that point, President Hull was resigned to the possibility that he might continue on as president rather than stand for election in November. The Peace of Cairo did bring the war to an end before the scheduled election. The Race were disappointed that Roosevelt's death and Hull's ascension did not lead to the collapse of the United States.

=== Hubert Humphrey ===
- In a parallel universe, designated Earth-712 featured in the comic book The Avengers No. 147 (May 1976), Hubert Humphrey served as president. His immediate successor was Nelson Rockefeller, who was the incumbent president in 1976. In this universe, Richard Nixon never had a political career.
- In the alternate history novel 11/22/63 by Stephen King, Hubert Humphrey defeated the incumbent president Curtis LeMay in 1972. He was himself defeated by Ronald Reagan in 1976.
- In the alternate history novella anthology Then Everything Changed by Jeff Greenfield, following John F. Kennedy's assassination by Richard Paul Pavlick in a suicide bombing on December 11, 1960, Hubert Humphrey was elected Vice President by the Electoral College at the insistence of Lyndon B. Johnson, who was elected President to maintain stability. After the Guantanamo Bay Naval Base was destroyed by tactical nuclear weapons during escalation in the Cuban Missile Crisis, Johnson suffered a permanently deliberating heart attack that forced Humphrey to take command of the situation, including ordering and informing Nikita Khrushchev about retaliatory nuclear strikes against Sevastopol. Following the 'Sixty Minutes War', Humphrey became an unofficial acting president (akin to Edith Wilson's stewardship) owing to the absence of a mechanism to determine presidential succession or incapacitation.

== I ==
=== Lee Iacocca ===
- The movie World Gone Wild (1988) is set in 2087 where civilization collapsed after a nuclear war. In one scene of the movie, a character is looking at pre-war relics and finds a copy of Iacocca's autobiography. He mentions that Iacocca had been a great president.

== J ==
=== Andrew Jackson ===
- In the short story "Black Earth and Destiny" by Thomas Easton contained in the anthology Alternate Presidents edited by Mike Resnick, Andrew Jackson was elected as the 6th president in 1824, defeating John Quincy Adams. His vice president was John C. Calhoun. As a result, biological and chemical engineering were developed earlier.
- In the short story "Chickasaw Slave" by Judith Moffett, also contained in the anthology Alternate Presidents edited by Mike Resnick, Andrew Jackson's image is tarnished as a result of a land-dealing scandal. This causes him to lose the 1828 election to Davy Crockett, who becomes the 7th president. This eventually results in a Civil War occurring over the Compromise of 1850 and a different version of the Confederacy winning its independence in 1853.
- In the alternate history novel The Two Georges by Harry Turtledove and Richard Dreyfuss, Andrew Jackson was the Governor-General of the North American Union in 1834. He oversaw the end of slavery in the NAU, as recommended by Westminster.
- In the alternate history/time travel e-book Hail! Hail! by Harry Turtledove in which the Marx Brothers are sent back in time from 1934 to 1826 and interference with the Fredonian Rebellion. Julius Marx realized that Andrew Jackson was scheduled to defeat incumbent president John Quincy Adams in less than two years. Marx also realized that Jackson would be sympathetic to the slave-holding Fredonia and would probably fight the Mexican government. However, Marx also realized that Jackson would certainly be unsympathetic to the Cherokee who had allied themselves with Fredonia
- In the alternate history novel For Want of a Nail, Andrew Jackson at the age of 13 was part of a group of former rebels who after Thomas Jefferson's execution migrated from the colonies in the Wilderness Walk (1780–1782), led by General Nathanael Greene whose party also included James Madison, James Monroe, Alexander Hamilton and Benedict Arnold. He later became a commander of an army from Jefferson (an ex-Patriot state, formerly Mexican Texas), orchestrating the capture of Mexico City in 1817. By 1819, he has merged Jefferson and Mexico in the United States of Mexico, becoming its first president in 1821.
- In the parallel universe featured in Fringe, Andrew Jackson had never served as president and, consequently, the twenty-dollar bill did not feature his portrait but that of Martin Luther King Jr. The counterparts of the Fringe Division members had never heard of Jackson in 2010. It is unclear whether Jackson had never been born in this universe or whether his counterpart had merely had a less distinguished and historically significant life and career.
- In the alternative history novel 1824: The Arkansas War by Eric Flint, Andrew Jackson was one of the four candidates of the 1824 United States presidential election. However, the election is thrown into the House of Representatives between Henry Clay and Jackson. Clay forms a political alliance with William Crawford and John C. Calhoun while John Quincy Adams supports Jackson. Clay ends up winning the election. After he becomes president, he engineers a conflict against the independent Arkansas Confederacy (a nation of voluntarily transplanted southern Indian nations and free negroes) by secretly and illegally arming a freebooter expedition led by Robert Crittenden that was intended to (and did) fail miserably.

=== Henry M. "Scoop" Jackson ===
- Henry M. Jackson is the president in 1986 in the "main" US timeline from Edward William Bear's universe in the book The Probability Broach as part of the North American Confederacy Series by L. Neil Smith. In the book itself, he runs an ecofascist government and he is only referred to as "President Jackson"; his identity is confirmed in the later sequel The Gallatin Divergence.

=== Michael Jackson ===
- Michael Jackson was president in the short story, "SEAQ and Destroy" by Charles Stross.

=== Rev. Jesse Jackson ===
- Jesse Jackson was president in Greg Costikyan's 1994 story "The West is Red", in which the Soviet Union won the Cold War. Jackson tried to walk a tightrope, instituting moderate social democratic reforms and partial nationalisations without altogether dismantling capitalism. However, an attempted coup d'état in 1989 tipped the balance and in the aftermath of its failure the United States fully adopted Communism.

=== Thomas Jefferson ===
- In a parallel universe featured in the short story "He Walked Around the Horses" by H. Beam Piper, Thomas Jefferson was a major participant in the short-lived rebellion in the colonies of the British North America in the 1770s. He was the author of the American rebels' Declaration of Philadelphia in which the colonies were styled as the "United States of America." After the defeat of the rebels, Jefferson fled to Havana, Cuba and eventually died in the Principality of Liechtenstein several years prior to 1809. A seemingly insane individual who claimed to be a British diplomat named Benjamin Bathurst maintained that the American rebels were successful in their attempts to achieve independence, Jefferson had gone to serve as the President of the United States and had been succeeded by James Madison.
- In the alternate history novel For Want of a Nail: If Burgoyne Had Won at Saratoga by the business historian Robert Sobel, Thomas Jefferson was a leading figure in the North American Rebellion (1775–1778) and the principal author of the Declaration of Independence. In June 1775, he was named a delegate of the Second Continental Congress, where he joined the radical John Adams in seeking independence from Great Britain. The following year, Adams had Jefferson appointed to the committee which drafted the Declaration of Independence, along with himself and Benjamin Franklin. Jefferson wrote the first draft of the Declaration, which was edited by the other committee members, then presented to the Congress on June 28, 1776, where it underwent further revision before being ratified on July 2, 1776, and signed on July 4, 1776. In September 1776, Jefferson was elected to the Virginia House of Delegates, where he worked to revise Virginia's laws to bring them in line with his own republican beliefs. In June 1778, after Congress adopted the Carlisle Proposals and returned the colonies to British rule, Jefferson was arrested and brought to London to stand trial for treason. He and Adams were both convicted and executed by hanging in 1779. After Jefferson's death, the former rebels who migrated from the colonies in the Wilderness Walk (1780–1782), led by General Nathanael Greene whose party included James Madison, James Monroe, Alexander Hamilton, Benedict Arnold and the 13-year-old Andrew Jackson, named their settlement in New Spain "Jefferson" in his honor. Jefferson's radical republicanism subsequently gave birth to a worldwide revolutionary known as "Jeffersonism".
- In the alternate history novel The Probability Broach as part of the North American Confederacy Series by L. Neil Smith in which the United States became a Libertarian state after a successful Whiskey Rebellion and George Washington being overthrown and executed by firing squad for treason in 1794, Thomas Jefferson adopts a new calendar system in 1796. He originally proposed the calendar system to mark Albert Gallatin's ascension to the presidency. However, Gallatin protested that the real Revolution was in 1776, that the Federalist period should be regarded as an aberration, and that commemorating, even by implication, the overthrowing and execution of George Washington might set a hideous precedent. In addition to this, Gallatin assisted historians to still count Washington as the first president. In the calendar systems final form, the year 1776 became the new year zero Anno Liberatis (A.L.) (Latin for "year of liberation"). In 1800, he develops a new weight and measuring system ("metric" inches, pounds, etc.). In 1811, he was targeted for assassination, but survived and killed his attempted assassin, although he did get stabbed in the leg with a knife and is forced to walk with a limp and a cane for the rest of his life. Jefferson was also able to successfully lead an abolitionist movement that sets all slaves (including his own) free by 1820. In 1820, he was elected as the 4th President of the United States and would serve until his death on July 4, 1826, and was succeeded by James Monroe.
- In the short story "The War of '07" by Jayge Carr in the anthology Alternate Presidents edited by Mike Resnick, Thomas Jefferson lost the 1800 election to Aaron Burr, who became the 3rd president. President Burr kept promising to stand down after one more term but was ultimately elected to a total of nine terms from 1800 to 1832. He died on September 14, 1836, and was succeeded by his 34-year-old grandson and vice president Aaron Burr Alston. It is implied that the presidency will henceforth be a hereditary office, making the United States a de facto monarchy or family dictatorship, as Alston's vice president is Paul Aaron Burr.
- In Harry Turtledove's Southern Victory alternate history series, Thomas Jefferson served as the 3rd president from March 4, 1801, to March 4, 1809, as he did in real life. Following the War of Secession (1861–1862) in which the Confederate States of America achieved its independence with the support of the United Kingdom and France, his status as a Virginian (and more substantively, his insistence on a weak central government) tarnished his memory considerably in the United States. Northern Founding Fathers and his contemporaries such as John Adams, Benjamin Franklin, and Alexander Hamilton were viewed much more favourably. Nevertheless, Jefferson joined George Washington, Abraham Lincoln and Theodore Roosevelt as one of the most memorable US presidents, though of the four only Roosevelt was viewed in an entirely positive light. In the latter half of the War of Secession, Jefferson's youngest grandson George W. Randolph had been the Confederate States Secretary of War, which also contributed to the fact that he was viewed unfavourably by later generations in the United States.
- In the alternate history series The Tales of Alvin Maker by Orson Scott Card, Thomas Jefferson is mentioned as serving as the first President of the United States, which only stretches from the New England states to Virginia and extends westward to Ohio.

=== Andrew Johnson ===
- In the alternate history novel The Guns of the South by Harry Turtledove, Andrew Johnson was the vice presidential candidate of the breakaway Radical Republicans in the 1864 election, running with John C. Frémont. The ticket only wins three electoral votes from Kansas and the election was won by the Democratic candidate Horatio Seymour, who became the 17th president.
- In Turtledove's short story "Must and Shall", U.S. president Abraham Lincoln was killed by a Confederate army sharpshooter at the Battle of Fort Stevens on July 12, 1864, while observing General Jubal Early's attack. He was succeeded by Hannibal Hamlin, who became the 17th president. Andrew Johnson, whom Lincoln had chosen to replace Hamlin as his vice president on the ticket in that years upcoming election, was sidelined. On July 21, 1864, he could do nothing but glare up at the podium from the audience as Hamlin was inaugurated.
- In the alternate history novel The Impeachment of Abraham Lincoln by Stephen L. Carter, Vice President Andrew Johnson was assassinated by the German-born Confederate sympathiser George Atzerodt on April 14, 1865, whereas President Abraham Lincoln survived his co-conspirator John Wilkes Booth's attempt on his life in Ford's Theatre on the same night. During Lincoln's second term, the Radical Republicans, led by Senator Thaddeus Stevens, came to see his failure to punish the South and to protect its freed slaves as akin to treason. Furthermore, the Democrats and the former Confederates regarded Lincoln as a tyrant who imposed his will in violation of the United States Constitution. These disparate groups formed a coalition against Lincoln and accused him of wartime crimes for having suspended habeas corpus, taking millions from the Treasury without Congressional approval, declaring martial law and conspiring to overthrow Congress. Consequently, the House of Representatives voted to impeach him in the spring of 1867 and he faced trial in the Senate, where his attorney was a 21-year-old African American woman named Abigail Canner.

=== Lyndon B. Johnson ===
- In the 2004 stealth action video game Metal Gear Solid 3: Snake Eater and its 2025 remake, Lyndon B. Johnson (voiced by Richard McGonagle in the English version) is the 36th President of the United States. Set in an alternate 1964 during the Cold War, Johnson is forced to authorize "Operation Snake Eater" to prove America's innocence to Soviet Premier Nikita Khrushchev after a rogue GRU colonel fires an American-supplied nuclear weapon at a Soviet research facility. To avert World War III, Johnson tasks the CIA and their solo operative, Naked Snake, with eliminating Snake's former mentor, The Boss, who ostensibly defected to the Soviet Union but was actually acting as a scapegoat under U.S. government orders. Following the mission's success, President Johnson appears in the game's ending cutscene during an official reception at the White House. He personally awards Naked Snake the Distinguished Service Cross and bestows upon him the iconic title of "Big Boss" for surpassing his mentor, retroactively foreshadowing the protagonist's eventual role as the main antagonist of the original Metal Gear and Metal Gear 2: Solid Snake. Disillusioned by his government's ruthless manipulation and the mandated sacrifice of his mentor, a visibly bitter Snake reluctantly shakes President Johnson's hand before leaving the ceremony.
- In the short story "Fellow Americans" by Eileen Gunn contained in the anthology Alternate Presidents edited by Mike Resnick, Lyndon Johnson lost the 1964 election to Barry Goldwater, who used negative advertisement extensively by bringing to light questionable incidents from Johnson's past. He became the 37th president and went on to be re-elected in 1968. President Goldwater ordered that nuclear weapons be deployed against North Vietnam during the Vietnam War.
- In the short story "Dispatches From the Revolution" by Pat Cadigan, also contained in the anthology Alternate Presidents edited by Mike Resnick, Lyndon Johnson persevered and decided to run for a second full term in 1968. This caused widespread protests in the United States, eventually leading to a bomb being planted at the Democratic National Convention in Chicago, Illinois in August 1968. The explosion killed Johnson, Vice President Hubert Humphrey, Senator George McGovern of South Dakota and Senator Eugene McCarthy of Minnesota. While the official history stated that Senator Robert F. Kennedy of New York was likewise killed in the explosion, he was actually killed by a Chicago policeman. The chaos at the Convention led to a revolution. Governor Ronald Reagan of California was elected president in 1968 and turned the US into an autocratic state. He used nuclear weapons to end the Vietnam War, leading to the vast majority of the Vietnamese people being wiped out.
- In ARC Riders by David Drake and Janet Morris, Lyndon Johnson was still alive in 1991 and still president, at least nominally. He was used as a figurehead by a ruthless cabal which, instigated by a fanatical American nationalist time traveler from the future, overthrew the constitutional government in 1968 and seized power with the intention of winning the Vietnam War at all costs. By 1991, the whole of North Vietnam was occupied by American troops but the war continued unabated in central China, and the US was on the verge of collapse and a nuclear civil war. President Johnson, kept alive by constant medical attention, has no real power and little knowledge of the acts perpetrated by generals and secret policemen in his name.
- In the alternate history novel Voyage by Stephen Baxter, John F. Kennedy was the victim of an assassination attempt in Dallas, Texas on November 22, 1963. While Kennedy survived, his wife Jacqueline Kennedy was killed and he was left crippled and incapacitated. His condition forced him to resign and Lyndon B. Johnson became the 36th president.
- In the short story "Tom Joad" by Kim Newman and Eugene Byrne contained in the anthology Back in the USSA in which the United States became a socialist state called the United Socialist States of America (USSA) as the result of a revolution in 1917, the Federal Bureau of Ideology agents Eliot Ness and Melvin Purvis met a bedraggled homeless man named L.B. Johnson in the compartment of a train travelling to Nevada in 1937. He told the two incognito agents, who were attempting to catch the legendary underground labor activist Tom Joad, that he was born and raised in Texas but was dispossessed by the Mexican Occupation some years earlier. Johnson's travelling companions were a teenage girl named "Boxcar" Bertha Thompson and a mute and seemingly insane tramp who wore a tiny bowler hat, "too big baggy pants" and "a too small suit", carried a little walking stick and possessed a "sharp toothbrush moustache and wide, scary eyes" which made him look like Adolf Hitler.
- In the alternate history novel The Mirage by Matt Ruff, Lyndon Johnson was the evangelical dictator of the Christian States of America, a Third World country which consisted of 17 states in the East Coast of North America, at some point during the 20th Century.
- In the alternate history novel Surrounded by Enemies: What if Kennedy Survived Dallas? by Bryce Zabel, John F. Kennedy forced Lyndon Johnson to resign as vice president in January 1966 using evidence which indicated that Johnson had been involved in the failed attempt on his life on November 22, 1963, as leverage. In exchange for the information not being made public until ten years after his death, Johnson agreed to accept a plea bargain for multiple counts of bribery and financial malfeasance during his tenure in the Senate. Following Kennedy's impeachment, trial and removal from office for multiple incidents of extramarital affairs both before and during his term in office, Speaker John William McCormack became the 36th president on February 24, 1966. Johnson spent the remainder of his life in a federal prison and died on January 22, 1973, at the age of 64. He was very popular with his fellow inmates as he often assisted them with their appeals.
- In Underground Airlines by Ben H. Winters, the assassination of President-elect Abraham Lincoln led to the adoption of a modified version of the Crittenden Compromise, with slavery being preserved into the twenty-first century in the 'Hard Four' states: Alabama, Louisiana, Mississippi and Carolina. One consequence of this is the 'Texas War', an inconclusive fifteen-year-long war of secession starting during the presidency of native Texan Lyndon B. Johnson, with the state's opposition to slavery resulting from demographic changes (i.e. growing free Black and Hispanic populations).
- In the alternate history novella anthology Then Everything Changed by Jeff Greenfield, Lyndon B. Johnson was elected president in 1961 by the Electoral College following the assassination of John F. Kennedy by Richard Paul Pavlick in a suicide bombing on December 11, 1960 prior to his becoming president-elect. While this move was largely motivated by the need to maintain stability following a national tragedy, it proved controversial due to the absence of a constitutional mechanism outlining presidential succession. He nominated as his vice president Hubert Humphrey. Johnson was able to get a Voting Rights Act passed in the first year of his presidency, precipitating local and state desegregation efforts in the absence of federal civil rights legislation, but dismissed Kennedy's proposals for the Peace Corps. Following the destruction of the Guantanamo Bay Naval Base by a Soviet tactical nuclear weapon during the Cuban Missile Crisis, Johnson suffered a heart attack that left him incapacitated, leading Humphrey to launch a retaliatory strike against Sevastopol. Humphrey would continue to exercise presidential powers for the remainder of Johnson's term, but public pessimism concerning the future derailed the administration's legislative agenda including Johnson's proposals for a Great Society, leading to a record low midterm election turnout of 13% in 1962.
- In If Kennedy Lived by Jeff Greenfield, John F. Kennedy survives an assassination attempt in Dallas on 22 November 1963 as the destruction of the Ford Lincoln's plexiglass bubbletop (installed to shield against rain) by Lee Harvey Oswald's first shot gave the Secret Service sufficient indication of what was happening. As a result of Kennedy's survival, Lyndon B. Johnson resigns in January 1964 due to the investigation into him in relation to Secretary to the Senate Majority Leader Bobby Baker's corruption and press investigation in his and Ladybird Johnson's ownership of the KTBC radio and television stations. Stuart Symington succeeds Johnson as vice president after he is nominated as Kennedy's running mate for 1964 and the ticket wins the election over Republicans Barry Goldwater and Gerald Ford. Johnson becomes the president of his alma mater of Southwest Texas State Teachers College, where he undertakes a fundraising and expansion drive and advises Kennedy to employ demonstrations by African-American veterans to pressure Congress into passing a Voting Rights Act.

=== The Jonas Brothers ===
- In the Avenue 5 episode "Let's Play with Matches", the crew and passengers of the titular interstellar cruise ship decide to replace Captain Ryan Clark with a new elected leader (after a 'citizen's assembly' comprising myriad committees broke down). However, after Clark finds himself being elected (in lieu of his character from a television series dramatizing events on board the ship as a joke or protest candidate), and with eighty-seven per cent of the vote, astronaut Spike Martin comments that it was more than the "Jonas brothers won for their second term".
