= Their Majesties' Bucketeers =

1981 novel by L. Neil Smith

- Author: L. Neil Smith
- Language: English
- Series: North American Confederacy
- Genre: Alternate history
- Published: 1981
- Publication place: United States
- Media type: Print (paperback)
- Preceded by: The Venus Belt (by publication), Taflak Lysandra (by chronology)
- Followed by: The Nagasaki Vector (by publication), None chronology

Their Majesties' Bucketeers is a novel by L. Neil Smith published in 1981 as part of his North American Confederacy series.

== Plot summary ==
Their Majesties' Bucketeers is a novel in which Offe Woom investigates the death of a professor on a world populated by trisexual tripedal aliens.

== Reception ==
Greg Costikyan reviewed Their Majesties' Bucketeers in Ares Magazine #11 and commented that "Bucketeers is an appealing novel, for three reasons: first, the character of the aliens, who are very human while remaining very alien; second, the Victorian character of their civilization, and third, the apparent verve and enjoyment with which Smith writes."

== Reviews ==
- Review by Jeff Frane (1981) in Locus, #246 July 1981
- Review by Debbie Notkin (1982) in Rigel Science Fiction, #3 Winter 1982
