= Frank Chodorov =

American libertarian thinker (1887–1966)

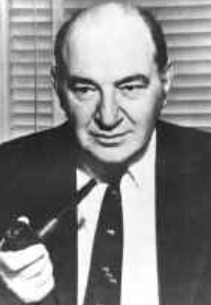
- Born: Fishel Chodorowsky; February 15, 1887; Lower West Side, Manhattan, New York City, United States
- Died: December 28, 1966 (aged 79); United States
- Education: Columbia University (BA)
- Occupation: Writer

Frank Chodorov (February 15, 1887 – December 28, 1966) was an American intellectual, author, and member of the Old Right, a group of classically liberal thinkers who were non-interventionist in foreign policy and opposed to both the American entry into World War II and the New Deal. He was called by Ralph Raico "the last of the Old Right greats".

Chodorov is best known for writing The Income Tax: Root of All Evil (1954), a book inspired by Georgist single-tax notions which has influenced many later libertarian thinkers, including Murray Rothbard.

== Early life ==
Born Fishel Chodorowsky on the Lower West Side of New York City on February 15, 1887, he was the eleventh child of Russian Jewish immigrants. He graduated from Columbia University in 1907, then worked at a number of jobs around the country. Working in Chicago (1912–17), he read Henry George's Progress and Poverty. Chodorov wrote that he "read the book several times, and each time I felt myself slipping into a cause." According to Chodorov:

George is the apostle of individualism; he teaches the ethical basis of private property; he stresses the function of capital in an advancing civilization; he emphasizes the greater productivity of voluntary cooperation in a free market economy, the moral degeneration of a people subjected to state direction and socialistic conformity. His is the philosophy of free enterprise, free trade, free men.

== Henry George School ==
In 1937, Chodorov became director of the Henry George School of Social Science in New York. There, he established (with Will Lissner) and edited a school paper, The Freeman. It published articles by Albert Jay Nock (founder of an earlier journal also called The Freeman), as well as such leading figures of the day as John Dewey, George Bernard Shaw, Bertrand Russell, Lincoln Steffens and Thorsten Veblen. Chodorov used the magazine to express his antiwar views:

Every day we must repeat to ourselves as a liturgy, the truth that war is caused by the conditions that bring about poverty; that no war is justified; that no war benefits the people; that war is an instrument whereby the haves increase their hold on the have-nots; that war destroys liberty.

With the coming of World War II, such views were no longer tolerated: Chodorov was ousted from the school in 1942. He wrote that "it seemed to me then that the only thing for me to do was to blow my brains out, which I might have done if I had not had Albert Jay Nock by my side." Nock had weathered similar "war fever" during World War I when as editor of the antiwar journal The Nation, he had seen that magazine banned from the US mails by the Woodrow Wilson administration.

== analysis ==
Chodorov published articles in a variety of magazines, including H.L. Mencken's American Mercury, the Saturday Evening Post and Scribner's. In 1944, he launched a four-page monthly broadsheet called analysis, described as "an individualistic publication—the only one of its kind in America." Murray Rothbard called it "one of the best, though undoubtedly the most neglected, of the 'little magazines' that has ever been published in the United States."

Along with Nock's works, Chodorov was influenced by Franz Oppenheimer's The State: "between the state and the individual there is always a tug-of-war," wrote Chodorov, "whatever power one acquires must be to the detriment of the other."

== The Freeman ==
In 1954, Chodorov again became editor of The Freeman, in its new incarnation, revived under the auspices of Foundation for Economic Education (FEE). He contributed several articles over the years to its Essays in Liberty series, beginning with Volume 1 in 1952. He engaged with William F. Buckley and Willi Schlamm on the question of whether individualists should support interventionism to aid people resisting communist aggression. Chodorov continued to advocate nonintervention, but as the Cold War continued, he lost influence: the American conservative movement came to be a bastion of interventionist foreign policy in combating Socialism.

== Intercollegiate Society of Individualists ==
In 1953, Chodorov founded the Intercollegiate Society of Individualists (ISI), with Buckley as president, becoming the first national conservative student organization, reaching 50,000 members by the end of the century. In later years, ISI became extremely influential as a clearinghouse of conservative publications and as a locus of the conservative intellectual movement in America. It later evolved into the Intercollegiate Studies Institute.

Chodorov was a major influence on many of those who would go on to lead the libertarian and conservative movements, including Buckley, M. Stanton Evans, Murray Rothbard, Edmund A. Opitz, and James J. Martin. Rothbard wrote:

I shall never forget the profound thrill—a thrill of intellectual liberation—that ran through me when I first encountered the name of Frank Chodorov, months before we were to meet in person. As a young graduate student in economics, I had always believed in the free market, and had become increasingly libertarian over the years, but this sentiment was as nothing to the headline that burst forth in the title of a pamphlet that I chanced upon at the university bookstore: Taxation is Robbery, by Frank Chodorov. There it was; simple perhaps, but how many of us, let alone how many professors of the economics of taxation, have ever given utterance to this shattering and demolishing truth?

== Later years ==
Chodorov was not raised religious, but gained a greater appreciation for religious thought in later years. He was a fan of westerns.

== In popular culture ==
In the North American Confederacy alternate history series by L. Neil Smith, in which the United States becomes a libertarian state after a successful Whiskey Rebellion and the overthrowing and execution of George Washington by firing squad for treason in 1794, Frank Chodorov was chosen by the Continental Congress to be H. L. Mencken's successor after his death in a duel in 1933. He served as the 20th President of the North American Confederacy from 1933 to 1940. He was succeeded by Rose Wilder Lane, who served as the 21st president from 1940 to 1952.

== Works ==
- The Economics of Society, Government and State (1946)
- One is a Crowd: Reflections of an Individualist (1952)
- The Income Tax: Root of All Evil (1954)
- The Rise & Fall of Society: An Essay on the Economic Forces That Underline Social Institutions (1959)
- Flight to Russia (1959)
- Out of Step: The Autobiography of an Individualist (1962)
- Fugitive Essays (1980)

== See also ==
- Albert Jay Nock, a key influence for Chodorov, and to whom The Income Tax: Root of All Evil is dedicated
