= Joe Steele (novel) =

2015 novel by Harry Turtledove

- First edition of Joe Steele
- Author: Harry Turtledove
- Cover artist: Paul Youll
- Language: English
- Genre: Alternate history novel
- Publisher: Roc Books
- Publication date: April 2015
- Publication place: United States
- Media type: Print (Hardcover)
- Pages: 438 pp
- ISBN: 978-0-451-47218-2
- Dewey Decimal: 813'.54--dc23
- LC Class: PS3570.U76J64 2015

Joe Steele is an alternate history novel by Harry Turtledove, first published by Roc Books/New American Library in hardcover and ebook form in April 2015. It is an expanded version of the author's 2003 short story of the same name.

The original concept comes from a line in Janis Ian's song "God and the FBI" which says "Stalin was a Democrat". In the foreword, Turtledove explains that from hearing this song, he began to imagine reasons for Stalin to be a Democrat, and the story grew from there. Janis Ian was an editor of the original short story, and is the dedicatee of the resulting novel.

== Plot summary ==
The novel explores what might have happened had Joseph Stalin been raised in the United States, postulating his parents having emigrated a few months before his birth, instead of remaining in the Russian Empire. It depicts Stalin (in this history, taking the name Joe Steele) growing up to be an American politician, rising to the presidency and retaining it by ruthless methods through the Great Depression, World War II, and the early Cold War. The president is depicted as having the soul of a tyrant, with Stalin's real-world career mirrored by actions taken by Steele.

During the 1932 Democratic Convention in Chicago, Illinois, the party had decided on two front runners: California Congressman Joe Steele, and; incumbent Governor of New York Franklin D. Roosevelt. However, after two days of votes, neither candidate has the needed two-thirds majority, although Roosevelt had a slight edge. Realizing he might lose after another day of voting, Steele directed one of his aides Vince "The Hammer" Scriabin to have Roosevelt burned alive at the New York State Executive Mansion in Albany. Steele's other assistants Lazar Kagan and Stas Mikoian were not privy to the initial planning. However, Charlie Sullivan, by happenstance, overheard Scriabin on the phone giving the order for the arson. Steele never knew this. However, in light of Sullivan's "fairness" in his reporting, Steele personally met with Sullivan and promised that Sullivan would always have access to Steele's camp.

When the New York State Executive Mansion is set ablaze, Roosevelt is burned alive in the fire since he could not escape in time due to him being rendered immobile by polio. His wife Eleanor and several members of the mansion staff are also killed in the fire. The Roosevelts are then buried in Hyde Park, New York following their deaths.

With Roosevelt dead, the Democratic Party has little choice but to nominate Steele as their candidate for the 1932 Presidential election with John Nance Garner of Texas as his running mate, with whom Steele had reached an early arrangement. Steele would go on to defeat Republican incumbent Herbert Hoover in a landslide and become the 32nd President of the United States.

Rather than Roosevelt's New Deal plan, Steele implements the Four-Year Plan, in lieu of Stalin's Five-Year Plan, which entails massive infrastructure projects, nationalizing the banks and the formation of the Tennessee Valley Authority, as in the actual timeline, but also the formation of prisoner work camps for the pseudo-enemies of the state, called wreckers. Roosevelt's attempt to pack the United States Supreme Court to pass more of his New Deal laws is mirrored by Steele's arrest of four dissenting Supreme Court Justices (Pierce Butler, James Clark McReynolds, George Sutherland and Willis Van Devanter) known as the "Supreme Court Four" on charges of aiding foreign world powers, and has them executed. Additional political foes find similar charges leveled against them, including Senator Huey Long, who flees to his power base of Louisiana, but is assassinated regardless.

In 1936, Steele and Garner are reelected in a landslide against Republican candidate Alf Landon and his running mate Frank Knox, who only carry eight electoral votes from Maine and Vermont. Steele and Garner would also go on to defeat Wendell Willkie in 1940, Thomas E. Dewey in 1944, Harold Stassen in 1948, and Robert Taft in 1952.

In this timeline, Leon Trotsky is left as Lenin's heir, but Hitler's rise in postwar Germany commences with the same rapidity as in the real world. When World War II in Europe begins, only grudgingly does Steele commit to help Winston Churchill and Trotsky with the Lend Lease Act. When Japan attacks Pearl Harbor in 1941, Steele sets up tribunals to demand answers from commanders General Short and Admiral Kimmel, and has them executed for incompetence. When the Philippines suffers much the same fate, Douglas MacArthur is evacuated to Australia and then the United States, whereupon he is additionally charged with incompetence. Furious, MacArthur denies all allegations, but submits to execution to spare his family.

Minus MacArthur, the war follows much the same path as in the real world with the notable exception of the Manhattan Project, as Albert Einstein does not approach President Steele to propose an atomic bomb program. Without nuclear weapons, the invasion of Japan sets the stage for the end of the Second World War, with American troops invading from the South and Soviet troops invading from the North. After Emperor Hirohito is killed in an air raid, the Japanese lose the will to fight and surrender.

In the aftermath of Japan's surrender, the Soviets occupy the island of Hokkaido and the northern part of Honshu, under Fedor Tolbukhin with some Japanese Communists acting as his puppets in the new "Japanese People's Republic" (North Japan). Similarly, the U.S. establishes the "Constitutional Monarchy of Japan" (South Japan) in southern Honshu, Kyushu, and Shikoku. Hirohito's 12-year-old son Akihito becomes the new emperor, although he acts as a puppet to General Dwight D. Eisenhower, who is the one to actually run the country. The Agano River acts as the border between the two states with a demilitarized zone of three miles in either direction.

Meanwhile, the Soviets liberate the Korean Peninsula from the Japanese in mid-1945 and established the puppet state of the People's Democratic Republic of Korea with Kim Il Sung as its ruler.

Evidence of German nuclear testing, captured by the Western Allies near the end of the war, is brought to the attention of Steele, who demands answers from Einstein. Einstein states the potential for a weapon of enormous destructive power, but says he did not want such a weapon in the hands of Joe Steele. Steele has Einstein executed (along with J. Robert Oppenheimer, Enrico Fermi, and other colleagues), and the American nuclear project hastily gets underway.

The Cold War between Trotsky and Steele heats up in June 1948, resulting in a Korean War-esque Japanese War between an invading Communist North and an unprepared South, which ends in August 1949 after a short nuclear exchange which results in Sendai being nuked by the Americans and Nagano by the Soviets. In 1952, Steele is elected to his sixth term in the presidency over Republican candidate Robert Taft with the morose Vice President John Nance Garner in tow.

On March 6, 1953, Steele dies from a stroke at the age of 74. Garner assumes the presidency of a shocked cabinet made up of Steele's cronies, and has virtually all of them removed. However, a newly courageous Congress impeaches Garner for the sins of Steele, and the executive branch becomes vacant. In the political vacuum, GBI (Government Bureau of Intelligence) director J. Edgar Hoover assumes political control and becomes Director of the United States. It is then revealed that his rule over the country is even more ruthless and tyrannical than Steele's.

== See also ==
- Back in the USSA
- The Coming of the Quantum Cats by Frederik Pohl – one of the timelines in this novel also involves an Americanized Stalin.
