= North American Confederacy =

Alternate history novels by L. Neil Smith

- Author: L. Neil Smith
- Country: United States
- Language: English
- Genre: Alternate history
- Published: 1979–2001

The North American Confederacy is an alternate history series of novels created by L. Neil Smith. The series begins with The Probability Broach and there are eight sequels. The stories take place in a fictional country of the same name.

== Novels ==
=== By publication ===
- The Probability Broach (1979)
- The Venus Belt (1980)
- Their Majesties' Bucketeers (1981)
- The Nagasaki Vector (1983)
- Tom Paine Maru (1984)
- The Gallatin Divergence (1985)
- Brightsuit MacBear (1988)
- Taflak Lysandra (1989)
- The American Zone (2001)

=== By chronology ===
- The Probability Broach (1979)
- The Nagasaki Vector (1983)
- The American Zone (2001)
- The Venus Belt (1980)
- The Gallatin Divergence (1985)
- Tom Paine Maru (1984)
- Brightsuit MacBear (1988)
- Taflak Lysandra (1989)
- Their Majesties' Bucketeers (1981) takes place in the same universe, although none of the characters from the series appears in it.

== History ==
The ostensible point of divergence leading to the North American Confederacy (NAC) is the addition of a single word in the preamble to the United States Declaration of Independence, wherein it states that governments "derive their just power from the unanimous consent of the governed." Inspired by this wording, Albert Gallatin intercedes in the Whiskey Rebellion in 1794 to the benefit of the farmers rather than the fledgling United States government as he does in real life. This results in the rebellion becoming a Second American Revolution, which ultimately leads to the overthrow of the government and the execution by firing squad of George Washington for treason. The United States Constitution is declared null and void, and Gallatin is proclaimed the second president. In 1795, a new caretaker government is established, and a revised version of the Articles of Confederation is ratified in 1797, but with a much greater emphasis on individual and economic freedom.

After the war, Alexander Hamilton flees to Prussia and lives there until he is killed in a duel in 1804.

Over the ensuing century, the remnants of central government dissipate. The government can no longer create money, and only individual people can, it being backed by gold, silver, wheat, corn, iron, and even whiskey.

In 1803, Gallatin and James Monroe arrange the Louisiana Purchase from the French Empire, borrowing money from private sources against the value of the land.

Thomas Jefferson successfully leads an abolitionist movement that brings a peaceful end to slavery in 1820. Jefferson is also responsible for developing new systems of weights and measures (metric inches and pounds, among others) in 1800. He also devises a new calendar system to honor the birth of liberty as the old year 1776 becomes Year Zero, Anno Liberati's (Latin for Year of Liberation). When Jefferson first proposes the new calendar system in 1796, he originally marks it as Gallatin's ascension to the presidency. However, Gallatin protests that the real revolution was in 1776 and that the Federalist period should be regarded as an aberration and that commemorating, even by implication, the overthrowing and execution of George Washington might set a hideous precedent (as Gallatin insisted that historians should still count Washington as the first President). Jefferson and Gallatin compromise and utilize 1776 as the new Year Zero.

The absence of government interference creates a libertarian utopia where science and medicine advance at a pace significantly greater than in our baseline history. As Elisha Gray had already invented the telephone in 1867 (91 A.L.), Alexander Graham Bell instead develops a voder technology that allows chimpanzees, gorillas, orangutans, and other simians to communicate and prove they are sentient, and the greater primates are granted citizenship rights equivalent to all races of humans. Later on, dolphins, porpoises, and orcas revealed their sentience and joined the land civilizations. In 1888 (112 A.L.), Thomas Edison invents electrically heated streets. In 1947 (171 A.L.), colored television is invented. In 1993 (217 A.L.), mastodons are cloned back to life with frozen tissue.

== Presidents of the Old United States/North American Confederacy ==
The Probability Broach includes a timeline for the history of the United States which comprises a listing of those who followed Washington and Gallatin as the Presidents. In this history, the United States merges with several other North American nations to form the North American Confederacy in 1893. From that point, the individuals listed here are considered Presidents of the NAC. Many of these individuals are prominent in the history of either anarchism or libertarianism, and they are the following:

Number	Name	Years served	Notes
1	George Washington	1789–1794 (13–18 A.L.)	Overthrown and executed by firing squad for treason. First president to die in office.
2 and 7	Albert Gallatin	1794–1812 and 1836–1840 (18–36 A.L. and 60–64 A.L.)	
3	Edmond-Charles Genêt	1812–1820 (36–44 A.L.)	
4	Thomas Jefferson	1820–1826 (44–50 A.L.)	Second president to die in office.
5	James Monroe	1826–1831 (50–55 A.L.)	Third president to die in office.
6	John C. Calhoun	1831–1836 (55–60 A.L.)	Lost reelection to Gallatin in 1836.
8	Sequoyah Guess	1840–1842 (64–66 A.L.)	Fourth president to die in office, was killed in battle by a Mexican sniper. First Native American president.
9	Osceola	1842–1848 (66–72 A.L.)	Second Native American president.
10	Jefferson Davis	1848–1852 (72–76 A.L.)	
11	Gifford Swansea	1852–1856 (76–80 A.L.)	
12	Arthur Downing	1856–1859 (80–83 A.L.)	Fifth president to die in office
13	Harriet Beecher	1859–1860 (83–84 A.L.)	First female president. Advocated on banning alcohol during her presidency, though her plan is never put into action.
14	Lysander Spooner	1860–1880 (84–104 A.L.)	By 1986, half-metric ounce .999 fine silver coins were minted in his likeness.
15	Jean-Baptiste Huang	1880–1888 (104–112 A.L.)	Is of French Canadian and Chinese ancestry.
16	Frederick Douglass	1888–1892 (112–116 A.L.)	First and only African-American president.
17	Benjamin Tucker	1892–1912 (116–136 A.L.)	
18	Albert Jay Nock	1912–1928 (136–152 A.L.)	
19	H. L. Mencken	1928–1933 (152–157 A.L.)	He killed his vice president in a duel and was subsequently killed himself by his vice president's mother, resulting in him becoming the sixth president to have died in office.
20	Frank Chodorov	1933–1940 (157–164 A.L.)	Chosen by the Continental Congress to be president following Mencken's death.
21	Rose Wilder Lane	1940–1952 (164–176 A.L.)	Second female president.
22	Ayn Rand	1952–1960 (176–184 A.L.)	Third female president. During her presidency, she became the first president to travel to the Moon.
23	Robert LeFevre	1960–1968 (184–192 A.L.)	
24 and 28	None of the above	1968–1972 and 2000–? (192–196 A.L. and 224–? A.L.)	(Note: In The Venus Belt, Lucy Kropotkin claims that she came in second during the 1968 presidential election, avoiding the presidency by only one vote, her own.) (Note: In The Venus Belt, it was revealed that Olongo Featherstone-Haugh (pronounced Fanshaw), the gorilla who served as Vice-President in this book, had been elected President. At the end, Olongo retires and None of the Above (which is always an option on the ballot) is returned to office.) In 2008, "None of the above" is elected president for life, presumably abolishing the office of the presidency.
25	John Hospers	1972–1984 (196–208 A.L.)	
26	Jennifer A. Smythe	1984–1992 (208–216 A.L.)	Fourth female president.
27	Olongo Featherstone-Haugh	1992–2000 (216–224 A.L.)	Born in 1932 (156 A.L.). He had served as vice president under Jennifer Smythe. He was also the first non-human primate to hold office of the presidency. He was a gorilla.

== Themes ==
The North American Confederacy is much more advanced in science and technology and much wealthier than our Earth, implying the author's view that libertarianism is a superior political order. Smith states that his novels are written with the purpose of promoting libertarianism.

== Awards ==
The Probability Broach won the 1982 Prometheus Award, an award created by Smith himself and given by the Libertarian Futurist Society. The Nagasaki Vector, Tom Paine Maru, The Gallatin Divergence and The American Zone were all Prometheus Award finalists.

== See also ==
- North American Union
