= L. Neil Smith =

American libertarian author and political activist (1946–2021)

- Born: Lester Neil Smith III; May 12, 1946; Denver, Colorado, U.S.
- Died: August 27, 2021 (aged 75); Fort Collins, Colorado, U.S.
- Occupations: Novelist, activist
- Writing career
- Genre: Libertarian science fiction
- Notable awards: Prometheus Award
- Movement: Libertarianism in the United States
- Website: Official website

Lester Neil Smith III (May 12, 1946 – August 27, 2021), better known as L. Neil Smith, was an American libertarian science fiction author and political activist. His works include the trilogy of Lando Calrissian novels, all published in 1983: Lando Calrissian and the Mindharp of Sharu, Lando Calrissian and the Flamewind of Oseon, and Lando Calrissian and the Starcave of ThonBoka. He also wrote the novels Pallas, The Forge of the Elders, and The Probability Broach, each of which won the Libertarian Futurist Society's annual Prometheus Award (which Smith personally created) for best libertarian science fiction novel. In 2016, Smith received a Special Award for Lifetime Achievement from the Libertarian Futurist Society.

== Early life ==
Smith was born in Denver, Colorado on May 12, 1946. His father was an Air Force officer, and his childhood was spent in various places including Waco, McQueenie, and La Porte, Texas; Salina, Kansas; Sacramento, California; and Gifford, Illinois (all before he completed fifth grade) and then St. John's, Newfoundland and Ft. Walton Beach, Florida, where he graduated from high school.

== Writing career ==
=== North American Confederacy series ===
Several of Smith's works are set in his North American Confederacy universe:

- The Probability Broach (1980) is an alternate history novel in which history has taken a different turn because a single word in the Declaration of Independence was changed. The United States has become replaced by a minarchist/libertarian society, the North American Confederacy, in this parallel universe, also known to science fiction fans as the Gallatin Universe because of the pivotal role of Albert Gallatin during the point of divergence in 1794. The antagonists of the series are styled Federalists, or sometimes "Hamiltonians", after the historical political party of George Washington and Alexander Hamilton. In 2004, a graphic novel version was released, illustrated by Scott Bieser.
- The Venus Belt (1980) takes place in outer space and discusses other settlements in the Gallatin Universe solar system. The Federalists are attempting to base a new civilization in interstellar space, kidnapping and enslaving a quarter of a million women as breeding stock from the anti-libertarian timeline from which the viewpoint character of The Probability Broach had escaped, with a plan to someday return in force to take over both of the alternate versions of Earth discovered by way of the P'wheet/Thorens probability broach.
- Their Majesties' Bucketeers (1981) is a pastiche of the Sherlock Holmes tales by Arthur Conan Doyle, introducing the Lamviin, a trilaterally symmetrical race of aliens native to the arid planet of Sodde Lydfe. Their Majesties' Bucketeers introduces characters who later interact with others in the Gallatin Universe.
- The Nagasaki Vector (1983) is written from the perspective of a time traveler who is shifted from yet another alternative probability line into the Gallatin Universe by the nuclear explosion over Nagasaki (on August 9, 1945) during World War II.
- In Tom Paine Maru (1984), entrepreneurs of the Confederacy travel from world to world, exploring the various kinds of messes made by the Federalists who had been shifted back in time and scattered at random over the universe at the conclusion of The Venus Belt. The Federalists had created dozens of colonies, all of which had suffered disaster and retrogression under Federalist rule. Smith uses this device to criticize non-libertarian forms of government.
- In The Gallatin Divergence (1985), a time-traveling Federalist woman wants to change history but is opposed by the protagonists of The Probability Broach. As these two forces clash, history is once again altered and yet another timeline is created.
- The American Zone (2001), the final book in the series, is a direct sequel to The Probability Broach concerned with the refugees from various anti-libertarian versions of the United States who take up residence in the Confederacy, and the response of the Confederacy to terrorist violence.

=== Star Wars expanded universe novels ===
Smith wrote three novels set in the Star Wars expanded universe. All three feature con-artist, associate of Han Solo and previous owner of the Millennium Falcon, Lando Calrissian, first introduced in the film The Empire Strikes Back. The novels take place between Revenge of the Sith and Episode IV: A New Hope:

- Lando Calrissian and the Mindharp of Sharu (July 1983), the first novel in the series, follows Calrissian as he wins a droid, Vuffi Raa, in a sabacc game, but must travel to the Rafa system to claim it, where he is forced by Rokur Gepta into a quest for an ancient artifact.
- Lando Calrissian and the Flamewind of Oseon (October 1983), picks up with Calrissian and Vuffi Raa some time later, having started a freight business. Calrissian is invited to a high-stakes sabacc game in the Oseon system, where circumstances require him to assist in a drug sting, while defending against Rokur Gepta's revenge.
- In Lando Calrissian and the Starcave of ThonBoka (December 1983), Calrissian and Vuffi Raa assist a persecuted alien race facing starvation instigated by the Centrality, and learn about Vuffi's origins.

The three novels were collected as The Lando Calrissian Adventures Omnibus Edition (1994).

=== Other works ===
- Pallas was conceived as the first installment of a series that Smith called "The Ngu Family Saga". Pallas is the story of Emerson Ngu, a boy who lives in a dystopian socialist commune in a crater on the asteroid Pallas. Emerson secretly builds a crystal radio and is astonished to learn of the world outside the commune. Escaping, he discovers that the rest of Pallas is a libertarian utopia. Unable to forget his semi-enslaved family—whose "workers' paradise" is slowly starving to death—he designs a cheap but durable gun (because the libertarians on Pallas, to their shame, did not have a domestic firearms industry), and sets about liberating his former commune. At the same time, he must learn the skills necessary for life in the outside world. The novel thus functions both as a bildungsroman and a story of political revolution.
- The writing of Ceres, the second work in "The Ngu Family Saga," was funded by private investors organized as Project Ceres by Alan R. Weiss, a friend of Smith's. The plot centers on a figure skater from a small asteroid who is determined to compete successfully in the much heavier gravity of Earth, and her brother, pursuing mineral riches as an "asteroid hunter".
- The Mitzvah, a novel about a Catholic priest who is a pacifist and influenced by socialist values of the 1960s. His world is shattered when he learns that the German immigrant parents he grew up with have adopted him, and his true parents were a Jewish couple murdered in the Holocaust.

== Politics ==
Smith joined the Libertarian Party in 1972 (just after its beginnings in 1971). He served on the Platform Committee in 1977 and 1979, and in 1978 ran for the state legislature in Colorado, losing to Ronald Strahle by 10,895 votes to 1,925.

In 1999, Smith announced that he would run for president in 2000 as an independent if his supporters would gather 1,000,000 online petition signatures asking him to run. After failing to achieve even 1,500 signatures, his independent campaign quietly died. He next tried an abortive run for the Libertarian Party nomination, which ended almost as quickly when, in the California primary, Harry Browne overwhelmingly defeated him, 71% to 9%.

Although Browne was chosen by the party's 2000 national convention, Smith, because of a dispute between the Libertarian Party's national organization and its Arizona affiliate, appeared as the Libertarian Party candidate for president on the Arizona ballot. He and running mate Vin Suprynowicz received 5,775 votes in the national election, less than 0.01% of the vote. Shortly thereafter, Smith's supporters announced a new 1,000,000-signature petition drive; however, in late 2003, with the new drive once again failing to achieve even a small fraction of that total, Smith announced that he would not pursue another political office.

Smith endorsed the Free State Project and Michael Badnarik's campaign for president in 2004.

Smith founded, and regularly contributed essays to, The Libertarian Enterprise, an anarcho-capitalist and paleolibertarian journal.

== Published works ==
=== Fiction ===
==== Coordinated Arm series ====
- The Wardove (1986)
- Henry Martyn (1989)
- Bretta Martyn (1997) (sequel to Henry Martyn, connects to The Wardove)
- Phoebus Krumm (2009) (online comic with art by Scott Bieser, sequel to Bretta Martyn, hardcopy edition in November 2010)

==== Forge of the Elders Series ====
- Blade of p'Na (2016)
- Contact and Commune (1990)
- Converse and Conflict (1990)
- Forge of the Elders (2000) [comprising the previous two books plus a previously unpublished third book]

==== Lando Calrissian (Star Wars) series ====
- Lando Calrissian and the Mindharp of Sharu (1983)
- Lando Calrissian and the Flamewind of Oseon (1983)
- Lando Calrissian and the Starcave of ThonBoka (1983)
- Omnibus edition The Lando Calrissian Adventures (1994)

==== Ngu Family Saga ====
- Pallas (1993)
- Ceres (2009)
- Ares (2023) with Rylla Smith

==== North American Confederacy series ====
- The Probability Broach (1979, unexpurgated edition 1996, graphic novel 2004)
- The Nagasaki Vector (1983)
- The American Zone (2001)
- The Venus Belt (1980)
- Their Majesties' Bucketeers (1981)
- Tom Paine Maru (1984)
- The Gallatin Divergence (1985)
  - Brightsuit MacBear (1988) [first in new series set in NAC universe]
  - Taflak Lysandra (1989) [second in new series set in NAC universe]

==== Stand-alone works ====
- The Crystal Empire (1986)
- Hope (2001; with Aaron S. Zelman)
- The Mitzvah (1999; with Aaron S. Zelman)
- Roswell, Texas (2006) (online comic with art by Scott Bieser, hardcopy edition in June 2008)
- Timepeeper (2008) (online comic with art by Sherard Jackson)
- Sweeter Than Wine (2011)

=== Non-fiction ===
- Lever Action (2001)
- Down With Power (2013)

== See also ==
- Frank Chodorov
