= List of fictional United States presidencies of historical figures (A–B) =

Lists of fictional presidents of the United States
A–B	C–D	E–F
G–H	I–J	K–M
N–R	S–T	U–Z
Fictional presidencies of historical figures
A–B	C–D	E–G
H–J	K–L	M–O
P–R	S–U	V–Z

The following is a list of real or historical people who have been portrayed as President of the United States in fiction, although they did not hold the office in real life. This is done either as an alternate history scenario, or occasionally for humorous purposes. Also included are actual US presidents with a fictional presidency at a different time and/or under different circumstances than the one in actual history.

== A ==
=== John Adams ===
- In the alternate history novel For Want of a Nail: If Burgoyne Had Won at Saratoga by the business historian Robert Sobel, John Adams was a leading figure in the North American Rebellion (1775–1778) and the principal author of the Declaration of Independence. In June 1775, he was named a delegate of the Second Continental Congress, where he and Thomas Jefferson argued strongly in favor of seeking independence from Great Britain. The following year, Adams appointed himself, Jefferson and Benjamin Franklin to the committee which drafted the Declaration of Independence. Jefferson wrote the first draft of the Declaration, which was edited by the other committee members, then presented to the Congress on June 28, 1776, where it underwent further revision before being ratified on July 2, 1776, and signed on July 4, 1776. In June 1778, after Congress adopted the Carlisle Proposals and returned the colonies to British rule, Adams was arrested and brought to London to stand trial for treason. He and Jefferson were both convicted and executed in 1779. After their deaths, thousands of former rebels migrated from the colonies to New Spain in what became known as the Wilderness Walk (1780–1782). It was led by General Nathanael Greene and the participants included James Madison, James Monroe, Alexander Hamilton, Benedict Arnold and the 13-year-old Andrew Jackson.
- In the alternate history short story "Though the Heavens Fall" by Harry Turtledove contained in the anthology A Different Flesh, John Adams was a candidate for the office of Censor of the Federated Commonwealths of America in 1804, running against Westerbrook.
- In the Southern Victory Series, an alternate history series, also by Harry Turtledove, John Adams served as the 2nd President from March 4, 1797, to March 4, 1801, as he did in real life. Adams and other Northern Founding Fathers such as Benjamin Franklin and Alexander Hamilton were treated much more favorably in the version of history taught in the United States following the War of Secession (1861–1862), in which the Confederate States of America achieved its independence with the support of the United Kingdom and France, than his colleagues from the south such as George Washington, Thomas Jefferson and James Madison. In the 20th century, Adams' portrait was used on the United States five-dollar bill.
- In The Two Georges, an alternate history novel, also by Harry Turtledove, by the late 20th Century, John Adams had an ale named after him in the North American Union. His cousin, Samuel Adams on the other hand, became one of the founding fathers of the North American Union.

=== John Quincy Adams ===
- In the short story "Black Earth and Destiny" by Thomas Easton contained in the anthology Alternate Presidents edited by Mike Resnick, John Quincy Adams lost the 1824 election to Andrew Jackson, who became the 6th President.
- In a parallel universe featured in The Disunited States of America by Harry Turtledove in which the United States did not reach the compromise of a bicameral legislative branch at the Constitutional Convention in 1787 and the various states became independent nations by the early 1800s, John Quincy Adams was the head of state of the country of Massachusetts in 1837. That year, he led his country through the Second Northeastern War against New York, successfully annexing the county of Rhode Island. An angered citizen of Providence, Rhode Island, subsequently attempted to assassinate Adams, but failed. Prior to 2097, a film was produced depicting the events of the war and the assassination attempt. While it was broadcast in the relatively open climate of California, the film was banned in the politically conservative Virginia for fear of prompting an assassination.
- In the alternate history/time travel e-book Hail! Hail! by Harry Turtledove in which the Marx Brothers are sent back in time from 1934 to 1826 and interference with the Fredonian Rebellion, which took place during the presidency of John Quincy Adams. When Adolphus Sterne told Julius Marx that Fredonian leader Haden Edwards was trying to secure aid from the United States, Marx remembered that Adams was anti-slavery, and so would not be sympathetic to Fredonia. Marx also realized that, thanks to the lack of mass communication, Adams would not have much immediate say over how nearby Americans troops acted, and that he might be stuck with a fait accompli.
- In the alternative history novel 1824: The Arkansas War by Eric Flint, John Quincy Adams was one of the four candidates of the 1824 United States presidential election. However, the election is thrown into the House of Representatives between Henry Clay and Andrew Jackson. Clay forms a political alliance with William Crawford and John C. Calhoun while John Quincy Adams supports Jackson. Clay ends up winning the election. After he becomes president, he engineers a conflict against the independent Arkansas Confederacy (a nation of voluntarily transplanted southern Indian nations and free negroes) by secretly and illegally arming a freebooter expedition led by Robert Crittenden that was intended to (and did) fail miserably.
- In the alternate history novel Heartfire as part of The Tales of Alvin Maker Series by Orson Scott Card, John Quincy Adams is mentioned as serving as the Governor of Massachusetts.

=== Susan B. Anthony ===
- In a parallel universe featured in the Sliders Season One episode "The Weaker Sex" in which women held the positions of power and influence and men were treated like second class citizens, Susan B. Anthony had served as president during the late 19th century.

=== Spiro Agnew ===
- In the alternate history Dark Future novel series by Kim Newman, Spiro Agnew succeeded Barry Goldwater as president. His own successor was Charlton "Big Chuck" Heston.
- In Stephen King's The Dark Tower V: Wolves of the Calla, Father Callahan briefly wanders into an alternate reality where Spiro Agnew is president and supports an unspecified NASA terraforming program.

=== Aaron Burr Alston ===
- The grandson of Aaron Burr as well as the son of Theodosia Burr Alston and Joseph Alston. In "The War of '07" by Jayge Carr in the anthology Alternate Presidents edited by Mike Resnick, Aaron Burr Alston becomes the 4th President on September 14, 1836, upon the death of his maternal grandfather, to whom he had been vice president. It is implied that the presidency will henceforth be a hereditary office, making the United States a de facto monarchy or family dictatorship, as Alston's vice president is Paul Aaron Burr. In reality, Aaron Burr Alston died on June 30, 1812, at the age of 10 due to a fever. His grandfather therefore outlived him by more than 24 years.

=== Benedict Arnold ===
- In the DC Comics graphic novel JLA: Earth 2, US money from the alternate timeline known as Earth 2 bears the picture of Benedict Arnold instead of George Washington.

=== David Rice Atchison ===
- In the short story "How the South Preserved the Union" by Ralph Roberts in the anthology Alternate Presidents edited by Mike Resnick, David Rice Atchison, the President pro tempore of the United States Senate and a prominent pro-slavery activist, took office as the 13th President when both his predecessor Zachary Taylor and Vice President Millard Fillmore were killed in a carriage accident shortly into their terms in 1849. Several months after President Atchison's accession, the American Civil War broke out on April 17, 1849, with the secession of Massachusetts from the Union and the Second Battle of Lexington and Concord, from which the rebelling abolitionists, who styled themselves as the New Minutemen, emerged victorious. New Hampshire and Vermont seceded shortly thereafter and were soon followed by the three remaining New England states, New York, New Jersey and Pennsylvania. The seceding Northeastern states banded together to form the New England Confederacy with Daniel Webster as its first and only president and the revolutionary abolitionist John Brown as the commander of its army. The war came to an end in 1855, two years after President Atchison had issued a proclamation promising that any slave who fought in the United States Army would be granted his freedom following the end of the war and that any factory slave who worked satisfactorily would be granted his or her freedom after the war and would be paid for that work from then onwards. He was succeeded by Stephen A. Douglas, who became the 14th President and introduced the Civil Rights Act 1861 which abolishes slavery in the United States in its entirety.

== B ==
=== James Baker ===
- James Baker is elected President in 1996 (possibly already having served a first term beginning in 1993) in the story "Prince Pat" by George Alec Effinger in the anthology Alternate Kennedys. He was defeated in his bid for re-election in 2000 by the 37-year-old Patrick Bouvier Kennedy, the youngest son of former President John F. Kennedy.

=== Frederick Barbarossa ===
- In John Crowley's novel Little, Big (1981), the Holy Roman Emperor Frederick Barbarossa wakes up after centuries of magical sleep. He adjusts well to the modern world to the extent of successfully becoming the President of the United States and ruling as a tyrant.

=== Alben W. Barkley ===
- Alben W. Barkley succeeds Franklin D. Roosevelt as the 33rd President in Robert A. Heinlein's novel To Sail Beyond the Sunset. He in turn is succeeded in 1949 by George Patton.

=== Joe Biden ===
- In the first episode of The Last Ship, it is implied that Joe Biden served as president for one week after Barack Obama succumbed to the Red Flu. He then also succumbed to the virus, and was replaced by President Kelly Geller, the former fictitious Speaker of the House of Representatives, who delivers the news via teleconference to the USS Nathan James. Although neither he nor Obama are mentioned by name in the series, a printed news article in the Season 2 episode "Safe Zone" shows Barack Obama as the incumbent president before the outbreak, meeting with the newly appointed Secretary of Housing and Urban Development Jeffery Michener (who also goes on to serve as president later in the series). This strongly implies that Biden still served as vice president alongside Obama in the show and succeeded him briefly after his death.
- In the series finale of Parks and Recreation, Biden is still the president of the United States as of 2025.
- In the 2022 Mike Bartlett play The 47th, which depicts an imagined future history of the 2024 presidential election, Joe Biden (played by Simon Williams) resigns as both the Democratic candidate and President and is succeeded by Kamala Harris. Already doubtful of his prospects in the election, he decides to withdraw after Donald Trump unexpectedly announces his 2024 candidacy (at a rally where he was meant to endorse Ted Cruz) and secretly threatens him with compromising information about Jill Biden during Jimmy Carter's funeral.

=== James G. Blaine ===
- In the first Southern Victory Series novel How Few Remain by Harry Turtledove, James G. Blaine was elected President in 1880, the only Republican other than Abraham Lincoln to hold that office. Blaine was elected by Maine as a Republican to Congress in 1862, a major accomplishment in a year when the Confederate States of America had won the War of Secession (1861–1862) with the support of the United Kingdom and France, gaining its independence, and the Republican Party was being made to pay. He served for the next seven terms, earning a reputation as a fiery orator and debater in a minority party. As the people of the United States grew tired of the conciliatory stance the Democrats took towards the Confederate States, the Republicans soon began regaining seats. In the 1878 elections, following Democratic President Samuel J. Tilden's unpopular decision to remove the twelve stars representing the states of the Confederacy from the Flag of the United States, the Republicans regained the Congress. Blaine's star rose dramatically, and in 1880, he was the Republican Party's nominee for president. He won on an anti-Confederate platform. Blaine was immediately put to the test. The Confederacy recoiled at the return of a "Black" Republican to the presidency. Moreover, Confederate States President James Longstreet had been counting on the Democrats' indifference to successfully purchase the states of Sonora and Chihuahua from the Second Mexican Empire in 1881. President Blaine, backed by the popular will and anger of the American people, moved to block the purchase by threat of war. Longstreet, confident in his country's alliances with the United Kingdom and the French Third Republic, defied Blaine and the Second Mexican War began. It soon became clear that Blaine and the United States were out of their depth. The United States Army was woefully unprepared, suffering setbacks on multiple fronts. When Washington, D.C., came under Confederate artillery fire in late 1881, Blaine evacuated the seat of government to Philadelphia, Pennsylvania, where he established his residence in the Powel House. He was the final US President to use the White House as his official residence. While Washington, D.C., remained the de jure capital of the United States and continued to be used for official functions such as inaugurations and state funerals, Philadelphia was the de facto capital from 1881 onwards. Benjamin Harrison, the grandson of the Whig Party President William Henry Harrison, served as his Secretary of War and consequently shouldered much of the blame for the United States' military failures during the war. After over a year of bloody fighting, the United States sought an armistice. The Confederate States successfully took possession of the Mexican states. For the second time in a generation, the United States had lost a war while under Republican leadership. Further humiliating Blaine at a personal level, the only territorial concession the United States made was northern Maine, his home state, which was annexed by Britain into the Canadian province of New Brunswick. The Republican Party had split in 1882, with most of the conservative members following Benjamin Butler to the wayward Democrats and former President Lincoln's supporters joining the Socialist Party which eventually replaced the Republicans as the nation's second party. The Republican Party would continue as a centrist third party with support concentrated in the Midwest. Ironically, President Blaine, in his military defeat, had laid the foundation the United States' eventual victory in the Great War (1914–1917) through two acts. Firstly, on April 22, 1882, Blaine declared a holiday to commemorate the United States' defeat called Remembrance Day. This day soon birthed a political ideology which the reinvigorated Democrats adopted as their own. Secondly, Blaine formed political ties with the German Empire, which eventually led to the alliance known as the Central Powers. He later went on to lose the 1884 election in a landslide, retiring to obscurity. Only truly die-hard Republicans revered him. President Blaine's defeat marked the beginning of thirty-six consecutive years of Democratic control of the Powel House which only came to an end with the election of the first Socialist president Upton Sinclair in 1920.

=== Chastity Bono ===
- Chastity Bono is mentioned in The Simpsons episode "Bart to the Future" by Lenny Leonard as a presidential candidate sometime before Lisa Simpson and having voted for him over Simpson.

=== Sonny Bono ===
- Sonny Bono is mentioned as President of the United States in the movie The Demolitionist (1995) set in the near future. His reaction to a mortar attack on The White House was that it was "Sad, really sad, and kind of freaky."

=== John Wilkes Booth ===
- John Wilkes Booth was President in the DC Comics "Earth-Three" alternate history, and was assassinated by actor Abraham Lincoln. (No detailed explanation given of how this came about; this is just one example of Earth-Three being "the place where everything was the opposite of our world".)

=== Charles F. Brannan ===
- In the book The Calculating Stars, Charles F. Brannan, Secretary of Agriculture under President Thomas E. Dewey succeeds to the presidency in 1952 after Dewey and his entire Cabinet is wiped out by an asteroid.

=== John W. Bricker ===
- In the alternate history novel The Man in the High Castle by Philip K. Dick, John W. Bricker was elected as the 33rd President in 1940, succeeding John Nance Garner. Like President Garner, the Republican failed to combat the Great Depression and remains strongly isolationist. Thus, the United States had insufficient military capabilities to assist the United Kingdom and the Soviet Union against Nazi Germany, or to defend itself against Japan in the Pacific. In 1941, the Nazis conquered the USSR and then exterminated most of its Slavic peoples. The few whom they allowed to live were confined to reservations. In the Pacific, the Japanese destroyed the entire United States Navy fleet in a decisive, definitive attack on Pearl Harbor on December 7, 1941. Thereafter, the superior Japanese military conquered Hawaii, Australia, New Zealand and Oceania during the early 1940s. Afterwards, the Axis powers, each attacking from opposite fronts, conquered the coastal United States, and, by 1948, the United States and other remaining Allied forces had surrendered. Japan established the puppet Pacific States of America out of Alaska, California, Hawaii, Oregon, parts of Nevada and Washington as part of the Greater East Asia Co-Prosperity Sphere. The remaining Mountain, Great Plains and Southwestern states became the Rocky Mountain States, a buffer between the PSA and the remaining USA, which became a Nazi puppet state in the style of Vichy France. Having defeated the Allies, the Third Reich and the Empire of Japan became the superpowers and consequently embarked upon a Cold War.

=== Jerry Brown ===
- The Dead Kennedys 1979 debut single "California Über Alles" features the fictional perspective of a soon-to-be president Jerry Brown, who aims to establish a state of "zen fascists".
- In one of alternate realities depicted in The Coming of the Quantum Cats by Frederik Pohl, Jerry Brown was President in 1986. Considered weak by one of the characters in his timeline, he was largely a puppet ruler, with the military being the real force governing the country.

=== William Jennings Bryan ===
- In Ward Moore's novel Bring the Jubilee, one of the time travelling characters in the alternate reality witnessed the 1896 presidential election, where he had to resist the temptation of covering the confident bets made by McKinley's supporters, who were unaware that William Jennings Bryan would go on to serve three terms as president. He was the candidate for the Populist Party.
- In the short story "Plowshare" by Martha Soukup in the anthology Alternate Presidents edited by Mike Resnick, William Jennings Bryan was elected as the 25th President in 1896 over William McKinley. His vice president was Arthur Sewall. He ended the Spanish–American War by granting full independence to Cuba, the Philippines, Puerto Rico and Hawaii. Only 36 years old at the time of his election, he was the youngest man ever elected to the presidency. President Bryan served one term from 1897 to 1901, declining to run for re-election in 1900 as he believed that presidents should only serve one term. In spite of this, in 1915, he revealed to the American public that he intended to prevent the expected Republican presidential nominee Theodore Roosevelt's plan to take the US into the Great War from coming to fruition by running against him and defeating him in the 1916 election. During his presidency, he was a vocal supporter of women's suffrage, which was granted throughout the United States in 1913.
- In one of the alternate timelines featured in The Coming of the Quantum Cats by Frederik Pohl, the election of William Jennings Bryan to the Presidency launched the US in the direction of intolerant religious conservatism - culminating in a highly repressive regime, virtually a theocracy, by the later 20th Century.

=== James Buchanan ===
- In the short story "Now Falls the Cold, Cold Night" by Jack L. Chalker in the anthology Alternate Presidents edited by Mike Resnick, James Buchanan dies from a stroke in October 1856, resulting in former President Millard Fillmore and the Know Nothing Party being elected in the 1856 election.
- In the alternate history novella River of Teeth by Sarah Gailey, James Buchanan signed the Hippo Act, which was a plan to import hippopotamuses into the United States as livestock as one of his last deeds as president in early 1861.

=== Pat Buchanan ===
- In Robert J. Sawyer's novel Mindscan, Pat Buchanan's presidency is said to have been marked by a drastic rightward turn in American politics that continued at least until the time the novel is set in 2045. As President, Buchanan packed the Supreme Court to overturn Roe v. Wade in the 2028 case Littler v. Carvey, which established individuation 14 days after conception (the point at which a fetus can no longer separate into monozygotic twins) as the point at which personhood begins and abortion is banned. Buchanan's administration also banned physician-assisted suicide. In the novel, Buchanan dies in August 2045, leading several characters to criticize the legacy of his administration upon learning of the news.

=== Aaron Burr ===
- In the short story "The War of '07" by Jayge Carr in the anthology Alternate Presidents edited by Mike Resnick, Aaron Burr became the 3rd president by manipulating events in the 1800 United States presidential election in which he defeated Thomas Jefferson. At the beginning of his presidency, Edmund Randolph was vice president, Edward Livingston was Secretary of State, Alexander Hamilton was Secretary of War, James Madison was Attorney General, Albert Gallatin was Secretary of Commerce and President Burr's son-in-law Joseph Alston was Secretary of the Treasury. By 1807, Hamilton had become vice president whereas General Henry "Light-Horse" Lee replaced him as Secretary of War. Although President Burr told the former that he was his chosen successor, Vice President Hamilton never acceded to the presidency and was eventually relieved of his position in 1812. Livingston became Burr's third vice president. President Burr kept promising to step down after one more term. Eventually, he became president for life, having been elected to a total of nine terms from 1800 to 1832. After serving as president for almost 36 years, he died on September 14, 1836, at the age of 80 and left the office as an inheritance to his descendants, thus turning the United States into a de facto monarchy or family dictatorship. He was succeeded by his 34-year-old grandson Aaron Burr Alston, who had been his fourth vice president. President Alston's own vice president was Paul Aaron Burr.

=== George H. W. Bush ===
- In a parallel universe visited by Superboy and Lex Luthor in the Superboy episode "Roads Not Taken, Part One", George H. W. Bush was President in 1990.
- Bush becomes the 42nd President of the United States rather than the 41st in The White House Mess by Christopher Buckley, roundly defeating his predecessor Thomas Nelson Tucker in 1992.
- Bush serves two full terms from January 20, 1989, to January 20, 1997, in the science fiction novel Einstein's Bridge. In 1991, he is not content with liberating Kuwait but continues the Gulf War up to conquering Iraq and toppling Saddam Hussein. Popular elation at eliminating Saddam Hussein serves to mask economic failures from the electorate, letting Bush win a second term in 1992 – while the problems of holding on to Iraq become evident only later. During his second term Bush approves completion of the Superconducting Super Collider in his home state of Texas – with the disastrous result that a few years later the operational SSC provides a foothold to a vicious race of insectoid extraterrestrials, who proceed to completely exterminate humanity and colonize Earth. Two survivors travel back in time and in order to prevent the disaster, change the outcome of the war and get Bill Clinton elected so as to ensure that the project would be cancelled.
- The Chopper Cops dime novel tetralogy by Rick Mackin also mentions Bush has served two terms, with one of his final acts being the creation of the US Tactical Police Force.
- Appeared as "Mr. President" in The Adventures of Super Mario Bros. 3 episode "Reptiles in the Rose Garden". Here, he didn't have any speaking lines, only talking in the telephone the whole time. Neither he, "Mrs. President" or others working in the White House noticed that Bowser and the Koopalings lifted the White House into Dark Land in an attempt to take over America, but was stopped by Mario and Luigi.
- In the short story "Dukakis and the Aliens" by Robert Sheckley contained in the anthology Alternate Presidents edited by Mike Resnick, Bush lost the 1988 election to Michael Dukakis, the Governor of Massachusetts, who became the 41st President. Dukakis was eventually revealed to be an enemy alien, and "friendly" aliens along with the Men in Black have to adjust the timeline to ensure that Bush is elected instead.
- In the short story "Fellow Americans" by Eileen Gunn, also contained in the anthology Alternate Presidents edited by Mike Resnick, Barry Goldwater defeated the early favorite and incumbent Lyndon B. Johnson in 1964 and went on to be re-elected in 1968. During his term in office, President Goldwater ordered that nuclear weapons be deployed against North Vietnam during the Vietnam War. Bush was elected in 1988 with Dan Quayle as his running mate. By 1990, he was growing increasingly unpopular due to his perceived poor handling of the economic recession. After a failed assassination attempt at the 1990 New York World's Fair, Robert F. Kennedy, the Governor of New York, informed his wife Ethel that he intended to seek the Democratic presidential nomination in 1992 and run against Bush, in spite of the fact that he had previously been reluctant to actively campaign for the nomination. It was Vice President Quayle's ambition to send a human mission to Mars, though Bush was rather more skeptical about its viability. Given that Goldwater served two terms whereas Richard Nixon retired from politics and was given his own late-night talk show Tricky Dick on NBC in 1970, it is unclear if Bush succeeded Ronald Reagan as the 41st President as he did in reality. None of the presidents who served between the end of Goldwater's second term in 1973 and Bush's inauguration in 1989 are identified in the text of the story.
- In a parallel universe featured in the Sliders Season Two episode "The Good, the Bad and the Wealthy", Bush was the President of the Republic of Texas in 1996. Shortly after the outbreak of the American Civil War in 1861, Texas, which had only been admitted to the Union in 1845 and was still hotly contested territory with the Mexican government, asserted its status as a sovereign nation by re-establishing the defunct Republic of Texas and began spreading both westwards and northwards. Without the troops to stop the Texians from doing so, the United States and the Mexico let this formidable country expand its size and power across the continent, eventually coming to encompass all of the territory from Texas to the former US state of California. It is not made clear what effect the rapid expansion of the Republic of Texas in the 1860s had on the Civil War and the prospects of victory for the Confederate States of America.
- In an alternate timeline featured in Fantastic Four, Bush died of pneumonia while in office and was succeeded by Oliver North, who became the 42nd President.
- In the short story "Mahogany Dreams" by Lyn Nichols contained in the anthology Alternate Tyrants edited by Mike Resnick, Ronald Reagan won the 1980 election with Bush as his running mate, defeating the Democratic incumbent Jimmy Carter in a landslide as he did in real life. After only 69 days in office, Reagan was assassinated in Washington, D.C., on March 30, 1981 by John Hinckley Jr. as the culmination of an effort to impress Jodie Foster. After William Henry Harrison, who died on his 32nd day in office on April 4, 1841, he was the second shortest serving President in US history. He was succeeded by George H. W. Bush, who became the 41st President. However, Alexander Haig, the Secretary of State, was determined to preserve the presidency from continued denigration and plotted to remove his rivals and place himself in the Oval Office, including Bush.
- In the television series For All Mankind, set in an alternate timeline where the Soviet Union being the first nation to put a man on the Moon led to an accelerated space race, George H. W. Bush served as Secretary of State during the first term of President Ellen Wilson, formerly an astronaut, NASA Administrator and US Senator from Texas. After Wilson came out as a lesbian in 1995, Bush supported her 1996 re-election campaign in the face of Republican hostility in Congress and from Wilson's Vice President Jim Bragg (who attempted to challenge her in the primaries). Being selected as her new running mate, Bush became Wilson's new Vice President after her surprise election win. After succeeding Wilson as the Republican nominee in 2000, he lost that year's presidential election to former Vice President Al Gore following contested election results in Florida.
- In the alternate history novella trilogy Then Everything Changed by Jeff Greenfield, Gerald Ford clarified his statement that "there is no Soviet domination of Eastern Europe and there never will be under a Ford administration" during the second presidential debate of 1976 and went on to win that year's election. Ford beat Carter in the Electoral College by 272 to 266 due to a shift of 22,000 votes across Ohio and Mississippi, but lost the popular vote by around 1,500,000. George H. W. Bush remained as Director of Central Intelligence for the duration of Ford's full term, potentially playing pivotal roles in organising the assassination of Ayatollah Ruhollah Khomeini and a lightning coup against Saddam Hussein, leading to the establishment of more moderate regimes in Iran and Iraq. Due to his official responsibilities, Bush was unable to compete in the 1980 Republican primaries (ultimately won by Ronald Reagan) and was not considered for the vice-presidential slot (ultimately filled by Sandra Day O'Connor).

=== George W. Bush ===
- In the How I Met Your Mother episode "Trilogy Time", when Ted Mosby predicts in 2012 that by 2015 he will be living alone whilst all of his friends will move on to lead perfect lives without him, a Metro Daily headline reads "America Regrets Giving Bush Surprise 3rd Term".
- In the Family Guy episode "Back to the Pilot", after Stewie and Brian travel back in time to 1999 (to the events of the show's pilot episode), Brian takes the opportunity to tell his past self about the September 11th attacks, which he then prevents. Without 9/11 to exploit, George W. Bush lost re-election in 2004 to John Kerry, returned to Texas and reformed the Confederacy, starting a second American civil war in 2011. By 2016, nuclear strikes during the conflict resulted in the deaths of 17,000,000 people (including Cesar Millan). Stewie and Brian manage to restore the original timeline, though not before myriad versions of themselves appear to warn their past versions either to allow 9/11 to happen or to prevent it, due to the disastrous consequences of previous changes.

=== Jeb Bush ===
- Jeb Bush was president from 2001 to 2005 in From the Files of the Time Rangers, a mosaic novel by Richard Bowes. Presumably this is a fictionalized version of the actual son and brother of the historical presidents George H. W. Bush and George W. Bush. Briefly mentioned several times in the novel, Jeb Bush has gotten into office in 2000 as a result of election fraud engineered by his family in Texas. He is defeated in 2004 by the fictional "Once and Future President" Timothy Garde MacAuley.
- In the independent feature film Duck, he is said to be the president of the United States, but is never seen, only referenced by way of the policies that his administration and Republicans in tow have enacted.
- In the series finale of Glee, Bush succeeds Barack Obama in 2016 and wins a second term in 2020, with Sue Sylvester as his running mate.

=== Benjamin Butler ===
- In Ward Moore's novel "Bring the Jubilee", the Confederacy wins the Battle of Gettysburg, wins its independence and imposes a humiliating peace on the rump United States. The Republican Party is totally discredited by the disaster and the voters turn to the Democrats, especially those who had most opposed Lincoln's war. Clement Vallandigham and afterwards Horatio Seymour held the presidency between 1865 and 1877. The Democrat administrations, however, prove disastrous. Due to high reparation exacted by the victorious Confederacy, the US economy goes into economic crisis and galloping inflation, which becomes dizzying under President Seymour and precipitates the food riots of 1873 and 1874. During the 1876 presidential election, Benjamin Butler - who could claim credit for one of the few successful episodes of the ultimately disastrous war - wins the presidency as candidate of the revived Whig Party. He manages to stabilize the currency by reorganization and drastic deflation. Still, the harm of the immediate postwar years proves irreversible, the United States is permanently crippled and goes into the 20th Century as a poor backward country overshadowed by the prosperous Confederacy.
