= List of fictional presidents of the United States (U–Z) =

Lists of fictional presidents of the United States
A–B	C–D	E–F
G–H	I–J	K–M
N–R	S–T	U–Z
Fictional presidencies of historical figures
A–B	C–D	E–G
H–J	K–L	M–O
P–R	S–U	V–Z

The following is a list of fictional United States presidents, U through Z.

== U ==
=== President Claire Hale Underwood ===
- President in House of Cards (Season 5–6)
- At the start of the series, she is the CEO of Clean Water Initiative (CWI), a charitable organization. She has also been married for over 20 years to Frank Underwood, a Democratic Congressman from South Carolina. She is a crucial part in helping Frank manipulate his way into the presidency after he is betrayed for the secretary of state nomination by new president Garrett Walker.
- In season 2, she is the new Second Lady of the United States from December 2013 after Frank becomes Walker's vice president. By the end of this season, she becomes First Lady of the United States in October 2014 when Frank ensures Walker's resignation and his own ascension to the position of president.
- In season 3, she serves for a few months in 2015 as United States Ambassador to the United Nations but is forced to resign after falling for a manipulation of Russian President Viktor Petrov. The reason publicly stated for her resignation is to focus on Frank's re-election bid to cover up her failing. This event, combined with increasing tensions with Frank motivates her to leave him just before the Democratic New Hampshire primary in January 2016.
- After weeks of tensions between the two and a coverup of their marital split, Claire returns to Frank when he is shot and wounded in an assassination attempt in March 2016. This is however at the cost of Frank agreeing to make her his vice presidential candidate for the presidential election by manipulating the Democratic National Convention. With Frank facing investigation at the end of Season 4 due to past crimes, Claire suggests stirring up fear of terrorism to improve their popularity.
- During the events of Season 5, Claire is elected as Vice President of the United States in the 2016 election by the Senate initially after the Underwood campaign abuses presidential power to force Ohio and Tennessee into a scenario where their results cannot be certified, thus throwing the election of president to the House of Representatives. She becomes Acting President of the United States on January 20, 2017 due to the House being unable to choose between Frank and Republican nominee Will Conway. During her acting term, Claire proposes a new election in Ohio and Tennessee that is adopted by Congress and sees the Underwood's win after leaking damaging recordings of Conway and his vice presidential candidate, General Ted Brockhart.
- Once Frank resumes office in mid-February 2017, Claire resumes her new role as vice president. However, Frank is continually hounded by congressional investigations into his past. With the help of Chief of Staff Doug Stamper, Frank manipulates events to allow a face-saving resignation.
- Therefore, Claire is sworn in as the 47th president of the United States on March 15, 2017, after Frank submits his resignation. This concludes Season 5.
- Played by: Robin Wright
- Political Party: Democrat

=== President Francis J. "Frank" Underwood ===
- President in House of Cards (Season 2–5)
- At the start of the series, he is the Democratic Majority Whip in the United States House of Representatives and a Congressman from South Carolina. He is initially promised the position of US Secretary of State by incoming President Garrett Walker but when Walker reneges, Underwood sets in motion a plan to replace Walker as president.
- The first half of his plan sees him become vice president after manipulating a situation to get incumbent vice president Jim Matthews to run in the special election for his old position as Governor of Pennsylvania, with Frank destroying the campaign of Congressman Peter Russo. Frank then makes a deal with Raymond Tusk, a billionaire energy tycoon with significant influence over President Walker, to ensure Frank replaces Matthews as vice president. During these efforts, Frank is forced to murder his lover Zoe Barnes, a journalist, as well as Russo to ensure their silence.
- During Season 2 as vice president, Frank continues to undermine President Walker and ensures his resignation on October 30, 2014, by implicating Walker in a money laundering scheme orchestrated by Tusk and a Chinese businessman to stack Congress in favor of the Democrats. Frank becomes president upon Walker's resignation.
- In the events of Season 3, Underwood is embattled due to low popularity from the Walker scandal, a hostile Congress and a rebelling Democratic party. After initially pledging to not run in 2016, Frank uses Congress forcing him to de-fund his 'America Works' job program (a massive reform of social security and medical benefits to pay for new jobs) to enter the 2016 primaries. He runs primarily against former Solicitor General Heather Dunbar in the Democratic primary.
- During this campaign, Underwood is incapacitated due to assassination attempt in March 2016 and is sidelined for two weeks, his duties fulfilled by VP Donald Blythe in an acting capacity. Prior to this attempt, Underwood's wife Claire had left him and it had been covered up. They resumed their relationship after the assassination attempt, with Underwood agreeing to make Claire his VP candidate in 2016, manipulating the DNC to do so.
- Runs against Republican Governor of New York Will Conway in the 2016 election. Underwood uses fear of terrorism to stir up his popularity against the more popular Conway and on Election Day he abuses presidential power to force Ohio and Tennessee into a scenario where their results cannot be certified, thus throwing the election of president to the House of Representatives. Claire briefly becomes Acting President of the United States for four weeks in January and February 2017 due to the House being unable to choose between Frank and Conway. Claire proposes a new election in Ohio and Tennessee that is adopted by Congress and sees the Underwood's win after leaking damaging recordings of Conway and his vice presidential candidate, General Ted Brockhart.
- Underwood is then sworn in for a new term in mid February 2017 but is immediately dogged by impeachment hearings due to his past efforts to gain the presidency. With the help of his chief of staff, Doug Stamper, Underwood spins what really happened with his crimes and uses it to face savingly resign as president on March 15, 2017, so he can enter the private sector and gain more power in the shadows whilst Claire is president.
- Played by: Kevin Spacey
- Political Party: Democrat

=== President Matthew Underwood ===
- President in The Guest of Honor, a 1989 novel by Irving Wallace
- Former TV Anchorman who was elected to the U.S. Senate.
- Married to former Supermodel Alice Armstrong Underwood.

=== President Nigel Uno ===
- President in: Codename: Kids Next Door – "Operation: W.H.I.T.E.-H.O.U.S.E." episode
- Played by: Benjamin Diskin

== V ==
=== President Gloria Valdez ===
- President in Chain of Command, a 1999 movie.
- Vice president to President Jack Cahill, becomes president when he is shot and killed in a struggle over the nuclear football.
- Forces China to back down during a nuclear exchange.
- Played by María Conchita Alonso

=== President-elect Francisco Vargas ===
- President-elect in Scandal Season 6 Episode 1
- Born in Philadelphia, Pennsylvania.
- Former Governor of Pennsylvania.
- First Latino to win a presidential election.
- Defeated Senator and former First Lady Mellie Grant in the 2016 Presidential Election.
- Assassinated on stage in Fairmount Park during his Election Night victory speech.
- Possibly the shortest serving president-elect in history, being killed less than an hour after the announcement of him winning the election.
- Political Party: Democratic.
- Played by Ricardo Chavira

=== President Funny Valentine ===
- President and primary antagonist in JoJo's Bizarre Adventure Part VII: Steel Ball Run
- Referred to as the 23rd president, taking office in 1889.
- Uses a Stand ability called Dirty Deeds Done Dirt Cheap to travel across dimensions, also capable of pulling objects and people from other dimensions.
- Has scars on his back in the shape of the modern American flag.
- Wishes to use the power of the Saint's Corpse (heavily implied to be the remains of Jesus Christ) to bring his country into a golden age at the expense of the rest of the world. In the climax of Steel Ball Run, he is able to use the Saint's Corpse to augment Dirty Deeds Done Dirt Cheap into D4C Love Train, capable of redirecting misfortune away from Valentine.
- Has the ability to play mandolin with his feet and dance without making a sound.
- Primary catchphrase is "Dojya~n!" (which translates to "Ta-da~" in English)
- Speaks of a metaphor relating to "taking the first napkin".

=== President Margaret Valentine ===
- President in: Y: The Last Man
- When a plague kills all males, Secretary of Agriculture Valentine is the highest survivor on the chain of succession.
- Based on Ann Veneman

=== President Rudolfo Valenzuela ===
- President in: The General's President by John Dalmas
- First Afro-Cuban President.
- Married to First Lady Manuella Valenzuela.
- Born in Puerto Rico after his parents emigrated there from Cuba to escape the Batista regime.
- Served in the US Army 101st Airborne Division in Vietnam and later attended university on the GI Bill, obtaining a PhD.
- Served as Deputy Secretary for African Affairs under President Wheeler, and later also served as Wheeler's envoy to Cuba after the death of Fidel Castro.
- Helped work out an agreement between President Wheeler and Castro's successor, Colonel Juan Augustin Lopez, which restored diplomatic and trade relations between the two countries.
- After serving in the Wheeler Administration took up a post as the Dean of International Relations at the University of Miami.
- Appointed Secretary of State by President Arne Haugen, replacing Secretary Coulter.
- Later appointed as Vice President in the Haugen Administration, replacing the reluctant incumbent Thomas M. "Jumper" Cromwell, the former Chairman of the Joint Chiefs of Staff.
- After President Arne Haugen is shot in an assassination attempt, he names Valenzuela as vice president before passing out and being hospitalised. Whilst Haugen recovers in George Washington University Hospital, Valenzuela serves as acting president.
- Becomes president upon the resignation of President Arne Haugen, who decides to retire shortly after getting shot. Despite not being born in the United States he eligible to succeed and become president due to having US Citizenship granted to all Puerto Ricans by the Jones Act.
- Appoints Marianne Weisner, the former US Ambassador to the United Nations, as his vice president.

=== President Hallux Valgus ===
- President in: Et Tu, Babe by Mark Leyner
- The 82nd president of the United States, Valgus had the distinction of being the first U.S. president with no gastrointestinal tract, having to survive via symbiotic bacteria in his torso which transformed airborne toxins into carbohydrates and protein. He wore a spandex unitard at all times.

=== President Josephine Vannebuker-Brown ===
- President in: Alas, Babylon by Pat Frank
- Served as Secretary of Health, Education & Welfare
- She is the highest survivor in the chain of succession after a nuclear war.

=== President Peter J. "Doc" Varney ===
- President the 1932 movie The Phantom President
- Hired as double for charisma challenged Presidential candidate Theodore K. Blair, Carnival Barker Varney
- become so popular on his own he is elected president
- Defeats Stevenson in the election by promising reform in government.
- Married to Felicia Hammond, daughter of the late former president Hammond.
- Played by George M. Cohan

=== President Villers ===
- President in the short story Franchise, by Isaac Asimov.
- Was a president as of fall 2008.

=== President Martin Vincenzo ===
- President in: Shadowrun role-playing game
- Served 2037–2041
- Defeated incumbent Andrew McAlister in 2036 Election
- Technocrat Party
- 2nd UCAS President | 48th US President
- Defeated by Carl Preston in the 2040 election.

=== President Philip Nolan Voigt ===
- President in: Marvel Comics's New Universe
- Voigt was elected in 1988 after telepathically influencing voters. He had the paranormal ability to mimic and outdo any other paranormal ability.
- Vice-president was Michael Dukakis

=== President Thomas Voss ===
- President in: Resistance: A Hole in the Sky
- President in 1953.
- 36th president of the United States.
- Former assistant secretary of the interior.
- Succeeded President Douglas MacArthur to office following the General's death in the Chimeran War; led remnants of the United States following the aftermath of the alien invasion.
- Status unknown as of the war's end in 1957.

== W ==
=== President "The Wacko" ===
- President in World War Z
- Was a rising, outspoken political star before the Great Panic.
- Appointed as vice-president of the United States after "The Big Guy" is sworn in.
- Becomes president after "The Big Guy" dies after the United States goes on the offensive against 200 million zombies.
- Lives in semi-retirement in Vermont
- Implied to be former governor Howard Dean

=== President Andrew Wadsworth ===
- President in The R Document, by Irving Wallace.
- Vernon T. Tynan, the Hoover-esque Director of the FBI, plans to order Wadsworth assassinated in order to take power, hoping that Wadsworth's vice president, Frank Loomis, will be less resistant to Tynan's theft of political power.
- Party: not specified.

=== President Jefferson Lee Wainwright ===
- President in A War of Shadows by Jack Chalker
- Imposes martial law after multiple outbreaks of a plague.
- Part of a conspiracy to seize power and impose elitist values
- After exposed by an FBI investigator, agrees to end the emergency and retire.

=== Acting President Glen Allen Walken ===
- President in: The West Wing (TV series)
- Played by: John Goodman
- Born in Liberty, Missouri, Walken is a Vietnam veteran, is possibly married, has a dog named Bess and is "one prime rib dinner away from sudden cardiac arrest."
- Walken was Speaker of the House and became acting president during a national emergency involving Zoey Bartlet (the position of vice president had just been left vacant). President Bartlet invokes the 25th Amendment and temporarily resigns before resuming office a few days later.
- Attempted to gain his party's nomination later; despite winning the Iowa caucus, Walken loses to Senator Arnold Vinick.
- Party: Republican.

=== President Garrett Walker ===
- President in: House of Cards (TV series)
- Former CEO and Governor of Colorado
- Democratic nominee in the 2012 presidential election; running mate Pennsylvania Governor Jim Matthews.
- Walker had promised to appoint House Majority Whip Francis Underwood as Secretary of State, but reneges on the advice of his mentor, billionaire businessman Raymond Tusk.
- Underwood plots to bring down and replace Walker as president while presenting himself as a Presidential ally. During his machinations, Underwood sets up alcoholic Congressman Peter Russo as the Democratic nominee for Pennsylvania Governor and then sabotages him in order to persuade the disgruntled Matthews to resign as vice president and run for his old post.
- Again on advice from Tusk, Walker nominates Underwood as vice president to assist in a looming trade war with the Chinese.Underwood earns Walker's wrath after sabotaging negotiations with the Chinese and covering up Tusk and business partner Feng's money laundering and political contributions.
- Following news leaks of the money laundering, Walker becomes unpopular as Underwood schemes to tag him with the scandal. Walker admits marriage counselling where he was prescribed drugs, casting doubts upon his ability to lead.
- After Tusk decides to lie to a Congressional committee and allege that Walker knew of the money laundering, Walker resigns to avoid impeachment.
- Political Party: Democratic
- Played by: Michel Gill

=== President Wallace ===
- President in: Interceptor
- Is in office during an international crisis when interceptor site Fort Greely, Alaska, is taken over by a terrorist group working for Alexander Kessel, a radical and disillusioned ex-military intelligence soldier. Simultaneously, others working for him steal 16 Russian RT-2PM2 Topol-M mobile nuclear warheads from a remote ICBM site in Tavlinka, Khabarovsk Krai.
- A second interceptor site in the Pacific Ocean, SBX-1 (Sea-Based X-Band Radar Station 1), is also attacked by Kessel and his group, leaving the United States vulnerable to nuclear attack. The stolen missiles are launched at 16 major American cities, with the potential to kill over 300 million people.
- President Wallace and Chairman of the Joint Chiefs General Dyson dispatch United States Navy SEALs to the SBX-1 platform, but due to its remote location they are unable to reach it in time.
- However, due to the efforts of United States Army personnel led by Captain Joanna Collins based on the site, the terrorists are killed and SBX-1's anti-ballistic missiles are launched and destroy the warheads. Kessel himself is later killed by Russian Navy personnel from the Delta IV-class submarine Danilov when he tries to escape.
- Wallace later personally promotes Collins to serve on her National Security Council.
- Political Party: Unspecified
- Played by Zoe Carides

=== President Dean Cooper Wallace ===
- President in: Clive Cussler's Dirk Pitt novels Flood Tide and Atlantis Found
- In office from 2000 to 2005. In Flood Tide it is revealed he has certain less-than-ethical connections to Chinese interests.

=== President Ward ===
- President in Dead End Drive In, a 1988 Australian movie.
- Mentioned in a television broadcast.

=== President Garner Ward ===
- President in: Clive Cussler's Dirk Pitt novels Trojan Odyssey and Black Wind.
- Described as resembling Theodore Roosevelt in appearance and manner. President Ward asked Admiral Sandecker to take the Vice Presidency after his original vice president was diagnosed with a terminal illness.

=== President Ralph Warner ===
- President in Homeland season 8
- Former Vice President of the United States, who served during the short-lived administration of President Elizabeth Keane.
- Briefly became acting president when Keane was temporarily removed from office under the 25th Amendment. Although she was later reinstated, Keane chose to resign from the office in order to preserve American democracy threatened by misinformation, polarisation and her own tarnished reputation. Her resignation allowed Warner to succeed her as president.
- In an attempt to unify the country after Keane's resignation, Warner chose Benjamin Hayes as his vice president, becoming the first president since Abraham Lincoln to have a vice president from the opposing political party.
- During his administration he oversaw a proposed peace deal between the Taliban, Afghanistan and the United States, negotiating with Taliban leader Haissam Haqqani.
- Killed alongside President of Afghanistan Daoud in a helicopter crash en route back to Bagram Airfield after delivering a speech to troops stationed in a rural area of the country.
- Succeeded by Vice President Benjamin Hayes, who orders a drone strike on the helicopter crash site to incinerate his body and prevent it being used for propaganda purposes by the Taliban.
- Political Party: Not stated (implied to be a moderate Democrat).
- Played by Beau Bridges.

=== President Jeff Warnock ===
- 56th President in Lockout
- In office in 2079, by which time the White House grounds are shown to be heavily fortified with concrete defences, and the Oval Office has been relocated underground in a secure bunker, similar to the PEOC.
- His daughter Emilie Warnock is taken hostage on MS One, a supermax prison satellite in low Earth orbit, after several prisoners escape. She was conducting a humanitarian visit to investigate claims of inmates developing dementia as a result of being held in stasis, and whether the Federal Bureau of Prisons has been secretly accepting funding from aerospace companies to utilise inmates to test the effects of long term statis for space travel.
- Warnock arranges to send former CIA operative Marion Snow to MS One in order to effect a rescue and extraction of Emilie.
- Is temporarily removed from office due to his handling of the situation, after Secret Service Director Scott Langral convinces the cabinet to invoke the 25th Amendment.
- Political Party: Democratic
- Played by: Peter Hudson

=== President Albert Baker Warren ===
- President in Timecop, "The Stalker" episode.
- 44th president of the United States
- Mother was 1960s movie star Rita Lake who married a U.S. Senator, and was the target of a time travelling stalker.

=== President Cristina Warren ===
- President in the 2018 Quantic Dream video game Detroit: Become Human
- Born on September 17, 1985.
- Elected to office in 2036 in a very close election that divided the country.
- Had no political experience and had not held any elected office before becoming president, but relied on her former career as an internet celebrity and vlogger to amass a large social media following that helped her to win.
- Oversaw some of the most tense US-Russian relations since the Cold War, clashing with Russian President Artem Ivanoff over ownership of newly discovered Thirium (a substance used in the production of androids) reserves in the North Pole. The tensions resulted in both nations deploying their naval forces to the area and engaging in skirmishes, which in the opinion of both the United Nations and her own Secretary of Defense Denis Riggs brought the planet its closest in history to World War Three.
- Said to be under investigation by Congress for her close ties to android manufacturing conglomerate CyberLife, as suspicions exist that the company helped her to win the election by helping her in obtaining compromising information about her opponent during the presidential campaign. This, along with other political struggles in her first terms resulted in her 2038 approval rating being at only 33%.
- Dispatched the United States Army to Detroit in an attempt to put down an android rebellion, ordering the soldiers to set up recall centers and destroy the humanoid robots.
- Depending on the player's actions during the game, Warren will hold a live conference at the White House to either make peace with the androids and accept their existence as a new life form, or declare war on them.
- Portrayed by: Christina Batman

=== President Caleb Warrens ===
- President in The Purge: Election Year
- The incumbent and presumably lame duck President of the United States and the leader of the New Founding Fathers of America in 2040.
- In the run-up to the 2040 presidential election, Warrens and the leadership of the NFFA decide to revoke immunity for government officials during the Purge, a move intended to eliminate Charlie Roan, an independent presidential candidate whose key campaign pledge is the abolition of the Purge, and ensure the election of Minister Edwidge Owens, the NFFA's presidential candidate.
- At an NFFA prayer event, during which Charlie Roan was planned to be sacrificed, Warrens and other members of the NFFA are killed by anti-Purge resistance fighters led by Dante Bishop.
- Portrayed by: Raymond J. Barry

=== President Warrick ===
- Female President in John Ringo's novel The Last Centurion
- Democrat, elected by 48.2% of the popular vote in the 2016 elections.
- Became mentally unhinged during multiple crisis faced by her administration, all worsened by her fatally flawed executive decisions.
- Replaced by President Carson (Republican) in a landslide during the intensely contested 2020 election.

=== President Washington ===
- An African American woman who served as president from 1981 to 1985 in the movie Tunnelvision (1975).
- She served between George Wallace and David Eisenhower.

=== President Thaddeus Waxman ===
- President in the 2018 video game Red Dead Redemption 2.
- Prior to become president, he served as a US Senator and a military officer.
- He is most well known for leading American troops to victory in Guarma (an island based on Cuba) during the Battle of San Juan Hill in the Spanish–American War.
- Elected Vice President in 1900 with President Alfred MacAlister (who is based on President William McKinley).
- After MacAlister was assassinated in 1901, Waxman subsequently succeeded him.
- Waxman proved to be a better president than his predecessor, advocating for mass industrialization which included the construction of a massive battleship for the United States Army. These actions greatly increased his popularity and he became beloved by the American people.
- While Waxman does not appear physically in game, he is seen on the game's physical map and on the Prominent Americans Cigarette Card Set.
- Political party: Presumably Republican
- Based on Theodore Roosevelt.

=== President Stephen Wayne ===
- President in First Lady, a 1937 film.
- Secretary of state who gains the presidency through the efforts of his wife Lucy Chase Wayne (Kay Francis), granddaughter of President Andrew Chase.
- Played by Preston Foster

=== President Donald Westview ===
- President in Steve Pieczenik's 1992 book Maximum Vigilance.
- 42nd president of the United States.
- Youngest president since Kennedy.
- Has a nervous breakdown causing him to resign.

=== President Graveney Westwood ===
- President in: Spy High.
- He was the key supporter of the Guardian Star as part of the American Earth Protection Initiative. (The Paranoia Plot).
- Opposed by several peace organisations and a Capitol Hill politician Senator Al Nathanson. (The Paranoia Plot).
- He was the victim of a failed assassination attempt by the Judson Siblings (Angel Blue)
- In office 2064 -.

=== President Thomas Westwood ===
- President in: The Lottery (TV series)
- Thomas Westwood accidentally caused the event, known as the "Global Fertility Crisis", which caused all women on Earth to stop having babies, when he tries to prevent global human overpopulation.
- Thomas Westwood became the president, in order to fix his mistake and save mankind.
- Thomas Westwood is assassinated by Darius Hayes, in order to control the embryos and the lottery winners.
- Played by: Yul Vazquez

=== President Westwood ===
- President in: Stealth Fighter (1999 film)
- President Westwood orders a covert war against Nicaraguan drug lords and mercenaries.
- Played by: Ernie Hudson

=== President John Lawrence Wheeler ===
- President in the movie Virus (1996).
- Played by Stephen Markle.

=== President Warren G. Wheeler ===
- President in the books Air Force One Is Down and The Hostage Tower by Alistair MacLean
- During his presidency his mother is taken hostage at the Eiffel Tower and Air Force One is stolen.

=== President Wheeler ===
- Former president in: The General's President by John Dalmas
- Previously worked as a professional football player before going into politics.
- Elected at some time after Ronald Reagan.
- After the death of Fidel Castro, he restored diplomatic and trade relations with Cuba by entering into an agreement with Castro's successor Colonel Juan Augustin Lopez.
- Signed the Brussels Treaty with the Soviet Union regarding the use of Scalar Resonance weapons, with both sides agreeing not to utilise them on the risk of mutually assured destruction.
- Oversaw the reopening and renovation of the Alcatraz Federal Penitentiary.
- Died in office due to coronary issues, where he was succeeded by his Vice President Kevin J. Donnelly.

=== President Nathan "Shagpole" Whipple ===
- Former president in the 1934 novel A Cool Million
- Former Governor of Vermont
- Expresses support for Fascist political views

=== President Whitcomb ===
- President in the 1966 Mission: Impossible episode "Operation Rogash"
- Mentioned in a radio broadcast in an attempt to make someone think it was 1969.

=== President George White ===
- President in: The Kid Who Ran For President
- Served from: 1997–2001
- Created by: Dan Gutman
- Party Affiliation: Republican

=== President White (no first name given) ===
- President in Warday
- Served from 1988 to 1993 (and possibly longer)
- Created by: Whitley Strieber and James Kunetka
- Party Affiliation: Unknown
- Previously served as Undersecretary of the Treasury.
- On October 28, 1988, when the US was devastated in a nuclear exchange with the Soviet Union. Had been vacationing at Key Largo when the war broke out, and was the highest Federal officer to both survive and agree to serve as president.
- Since there was no possibility of holding elections, never got a popular mandate and considered himself as "a caretaker".
- Was located (at least up to 1993 when the book's plot takes place) at part of the Federal Complex in Los Angeles. Though in name recognized as President of the United States, in practice had little power as California, undamaged by the war, cut itself off from the devastated other parts of the US, regarded refugees from there as "illegal immigrants" and treated them harshly, and acted as a de facto sovereign state (even to establishing de facto embassies of surviving foreign countries in Sacramento).
- It was left to President White and the remnants of the United States Federal Government to conduct surveys on the country's devastated situation and hatch various plan for re-unification with little chance to implement them.

=== President Whitman ===
- President on DAG, a 2000 NBC television series.
- Wife is Suzanne, daughter is Camille.
- Went to Harvard, lost the women's vote, and head of his Secret Service detail once jumped the wrong way during an assassination attempt.
- Played by David Rasche

=== President Thomas J. Whitmore ===
- President in: Independence Day (Independence Day, Independence Day: Resurgence)
- Served 1992–2000
- Whitmore fought in Operation Desert Storm as a fighter pilot. He is married to Marilyn Whitmore and has one daughter, Patricia. As president, he was criticized by political pundits in Washington for his inexperience in politics as well as his youth and for his inability to pass legislation through Congress, despite repeated compromises. At the start of the film, Whitmore has just failed to pass a crime bill and his approval ratings have dropped below 40%. The Orange County Register named President Whitmore one of the sexiest men of the year on July 2, 1996, the day the aliens arrived on Earth.
- Whitmore personally led surviving Earth resistance military forces into battle against alien invasion/occupation forces on July 4, 1996, after the death of his wife on July 3, 1996. This made him the first US commander-in-chief to lead troops in combat since James Madison took command of a rearguard artillery battery to cover the retreat of the US Army during the British attack on Washington, D.C. in the War of 1812.
- Fired his Secretary of Defense in Area 51 for keeping the existence of aliens and possession of alien technology a secret.
- Had communication with a captured alien through ESP, thereby realizing their true intentions of invading Earth to consume its natural resources after killing all life. This knowledge brings him to consent to using nuclear weapons over American soil in order to destroy the aliens, resulting in the destruction of Houston, Texas.
- Succeeded by William Grey, his head of US Space Command.
- Died 2016 manually detonating cold fusion bombs inside an alien queen's ship outside of Area 51.
- Party Affiliation: Democrat (mentioned in novel)
- Played by: Bill Pullman

=== President Widmark ===
- President in: The Adventures of Buckaroo Banzai Across the 8th Dimension
- Widmark is confined, either temporarily or permanently, to a specially made hospital bed due to an undisclosed back ailment. In early versions of the script, he is confined there due to mental instability. His advisors include General Catburd of the Joint Chiefs of Staff, Secretary of Defense McKinley, Senator Cunningham, and National Security Advisor Smirnoff.
- Declares war on the Soviet Union by signing the "Short Form" of the Declaration of War, under pressure from the Black Lectroids. Presumably rescinds the declaration after Dr. Buckaroo Banzai defeats the Red Lectroids, ending the confrontation.
- Quote: "Buckaroo, I don't know what to say...Lectroids? Planet 10? Nuclear extortion? A girl named John?"
- Played by: Ronald Lacey

=== President Alice Wiliston ===
- President in C.L. Moore's Greater Than Gods (1939)
- In one of the story's alternate futures, she is part of a string of female presidents in the 23rd and 24th centuries, all sworn to abolish war.
- Especially known for a memorable public confrontation with Dr. Philips, the country's most prominent scientist, who opposed the increasing tendency to a non-mechanized rural civilization, fostered by the president, and especially her cabinet's rejection of the work of a promising young scientist. The president's answer was broadcast worldwide on telenews: "That 'brilliant work', as you call it, was a device that might have led to war! Do you think we want it? Remember the promise that the first woman president made the world, Dr. Philips! As long as we sit in the White House there will be no need for war!" President Wiliston's position was approved of by women leaders in other countries, such as Queen Elizabeth II of Britain and Queen Juliana VII of the Netherlands. Later women Presidents continued in her footsteps, culminating with making Earth a garden world with humanity living in a low-tech civilization and cultivating spirituality.

=== President Jefferson Williams ===
- President in the 1999 Sliders episode, A Current Affair.
- Played by Eric Pierpoint.
- Is accused by the press of having an affair with Maggie Beckett (played by Kari Wuhrer) and uses the affair to take public attention away from the war in Switzerland and his illegal use of chemical weapons in it. He is later accused of murdering Maggie Beckett to which he denies.
- The episode is a satire of the Clinton–Lewinsky scandal.

=== President Laurence Williams ===
- President in The V.P., a 1971 novel by George Meths
- Was Elected after President Yancy.
- Uses a fake Nuclear Alert to confront Vice President Harley Dann in the executive Bomb Shelter
- Tries to prevent Vice President Harley Dann from getting the presidential nomination.
- Dann gets the nomination and runs against Senators William Fitzpatrick and Robert Harrison.

=== President Matthew Williams ===
- President in Escape from the Planet of the Apes.
- President in 1973 when intelligent talking apes arrived in a formerly lost American space craft.
- Played by William Windom
- Name from the fan produced Presidential Commission's Briefing Dossier.

=== President Abigail Wilson ===
- President in Harold Coyle's novel The Ten Thousand
- Former governor of Colorado.

=== President Ellen Wilson ===
- President in For All Mankind (Season 3)
- First female president, elected in 1992.
- First LGBT President, although for political reasons she remains firmly closeted.
- Birth state: Connecticut.
- Home state: Texas.
- Succeeded President Gary Hart.
- Originally one of the first female NASA astronauts, part of the "Nixon's Women" group that was formed in an accelerated space race after the Soviet Union became the first nation to put a man on the moon in 1969.
- Served as commander of the Apollo 19 and Apollo 24 missions to the Moon throughout the 1970s and later as the commander of Jamestown, the first permanent Moonbase established by the United States, in 1981. Also briefly served as interim Administrator of NASA before entering politics.
- Was elected as a United States Senator from Texas in 1986 before becoming the Republican nominee and defeating Democratic nominee Bill Clinton in the 1992 United States presidential election.
- Selected hardline evangelical and anti-science Governor Jim Bragg as her running mate and eventual Vice President of the United States.
- Wilson is secretly a lesbian, and is married to former NASA technician and gay man Larry Wilson in a marriage of convenience which enables them to escape scrutiny. Possibly due to pressure from her father, the Wilsons had a son, Scotty. She was previously in a secret relationship with a woman named Pam Horton whilst living in Houston.
- During her first term, she oversaw the United States' Mars mission, instituted a "Uniforms First" policy after astronaut Will Tyler came out as gay, and endorsed a Jobs Bill designed to assist former fossil fuel industry workers made redundant following the advent of nuclear fusion energy. However, she came out as gay during a live press conference to avoid the political fallout from Larry's affair with a White House staffer, fully reversing "Uniforms First" soon after.
- Was elected to a second term in 1996, described as the most shocking come-from-behind victory since Harry S. Truman's election in 1948, thus becoming the first openly LGBT person to be elected president. This was attributed to the honesty and courage she displayed in coming out, her leadership following the Johnson Space Center bombing, the endorsement of her Secretary of State and eventual running mate and Vice President George H. W. Bush, and moderate opposition to her Democratic opponent, Jerry Brown. She had narrowly secured her party's nomination, having faced a fierce primary challenge from Bragg (who would later go on to be elected President in 2004 and 2008) and the prospect of being impeached by her own congressional party.
- During her second term, she established the Mars-7 Alliance (comprising the United States, the Soviet Union, the European Space Agency, the Coalition of Communist Countries for Spaceflight, India, Japan, and North Korea) to promote cooperation in the development of the Happy Valley base on Mars, and legalized same-sex marriage via the Marriage Inclusion Act. She also publicly renewed her relationship with Pam, with the two marrying after Wilson left office and retiring to a private estate in Texas.
- Was succeeded by Al Gore in 2001.
- Political Party: Republican
- Portrayed by: Jodi Balfour

=== President Joseph Wilson ===
- President in: Out of Courage 2: Out for Vengeance
- Played by: Gregory Lehane

=== President Michael Wilson ===
- President in Metal Wolf Chaos (video game, 2004)
- In the near future, Michael Wilson, the 47th president of the United States, needs to use the giant mech, "Metal Wolf", in order to free America from the evil coup d'état forces of Vice-president Richard Hawk.
- Quote: "Nothing is pointless! And that's because... I'm the President of these great United States of America!"

=== President Slade Wilson ===
- President in Justice League: Crisis on Two Earths (2010).
- Former War Hero, Widower, with one daughter named Rose.
- President in a world dominated by the super-powered Crime Syndicate of America, an organization responsible for the death of the First Lady.
- Wilson is an alternate universe version of the character Deathstroke.

=== President Thomas Wilson ===
- President in: 2012
- 45th president of the United States.
- Served from 2009 to 2012.
- First African American President
- During his administration, the world is devastated by a global cataclysm that threatens humanity with extinction in the year 2012.
- Despite being offered evacuation to the global arcs saving remaining humans, Wilson decided to stay behind in Washington, D.C. and sheltered refugees in the White House. Earthquakes and ash clouds hit DC before a tsunami hit the city. The USS John F. Kennedy hits the White House, destroying it and killing everyone inside, including President Wilson.
- Succeeded by his chief of staff, Carl Anheuser, who appoints himself "Acting Commander in Chief" as Anheuser is the most senior survivor of the cataclysm.
- Married a woman named Dorothy, who died prior to his presidency and had a daughter named Laura who became a doctor.
- Played by: Danny Glover

=== President Berzelius "Buzz" Windrip ===
- President in: It Can't Happen Here (1935) by Sinclair Lewis.
- Former governor of his native nameless Western state.
- A U.S. Senator for his home state.
- Defeated Franklin D. Roosevelt for the Democratic nomination in 1936.
- Defeated Republican opponent Senator Walt Trowbridge in the 1936 Presidential election, running on a populist platform including promises to restore the country to greatness and prosperity, and an annual payment of $5000 for every U.S. citizen.
- Replaced the Democratic Party and the wider party system with a one-party Corporatist state.
- Upon becoming president, Windrip outlawed dissent, established concentration camps, trained and armed paramilitary Minute Men, curbed the influence of the U.S. Congress, curtailed the rights of women, persecuted African Americans and Jews, seized control of the media, and replaced the individual states with larger Corpo-controlled 'provinces' governed by military law.
- Never resided at the White House as president, instead preferring luxurious hotel suites.
- Ousted by Secretary of State Lee Sarason, who was the behind-the-scenes powerbroker for Windrip even before Windrip became a senator. Windrip's vice president, Perley Beecroft, escaped to Canada after becoming disillusioned with Corpo rule, claiming to be the rightful president and serving as the head of the New Underground resistance.
- Windrip was ultimately overthrown and exiled to Paris, living off a fortune he embezzled during his presidency.
- Reviewers at the time, and literary critics since, have emphasized the connection with Louisiana politician Huey Long, who was preparing to run for president in the 1936 election when he was assassinated in 1935 just prior to the novel's publication.

=== President Hugo Allen Winkler ===
- President in: The Tercentenary Incident by Isaac Asimov
- He was the 57th president.
- He was assassinated on July 4, 2076, and replaced with a robot impostor who continued to run the country undetected.

=== President Benjamin T. Winslow ===
- President in: Q Clearance by Peter Benchley
- He was president after Ronald Reagan.

=== President John P. Wintergreen ===
- President in: Of Thee I Sing and Let 'Em Eat Cake by George and Ira Gershwin
- Runs for president on a platform of "Love is sweeping the country." Publicizes his campaign by promising to marry the winner of a beauty contest, but instead falls in love with and marries a secretary, Mary Turner. This causes an international incident with France.
- Defeated for reelection by John P. Tweedledee in Let 'Em Eat Cake.
- Overthrows the government on July 4, proclaiming a dictatorship of the proletariat and later overthrown in a coup by the US Army after failing to deliver on his promises to them.
- Spared a death by guillotining when his wife helps incite the Army to turn on its leader.

=== President Arthur Coleman Winters ===
- President in: the 2007 episode "The Sound of Drums" of the BBC's Doctor Who
- Designated as UN representative during first contact with the Toclafane. He is assassinated by the Toclafane on orders of fictional British Prime Minister Harold Saxon, who is actually the Time Lord known as "the Master".
- Referred to himself officially as the 'President-elect' when addressing the Toclafane (which series showrunner Russell T. Davies admitted was a mistake on his part).
- Likely a stand-in for then President George W. Bush, with Barack Obama being depicted as president during the 2009/10 two-part story The End of Time.
- Played by: Colin Stinton

=== President Elizabeth Winters ===
- President in: Vanquish (2010 video game)
- First female president, secondary antagonist of the game
- Betrays the US to Russia, commits suicide to avoid prosecution for her high treason
- Played by: Lee Meriwether (voice)

=== President Winthrop ===
- President in "The Repairer of Reputations" by Robert W. Chambers
- Administration ends in 1920; he legalizes suicide chambers.

=== President John Winthrop ===
- President (elected 1970) in the 1939 Robert A. Heinlein novel For Us, The Living: A Comedy of Customs.

=== President Arthur Wright ===
- President in: The Endgame
- At some point in the past, he became a puppet of the Beloks, a Belarusian organized crime syndicate, and has acted on their behalf throughout his political career.
- As a senator, he convinced then-President Cutler to end his administration's backroom deal with the Beloks' rival family, the Vodianovs, and work with the Beloks instead. As part of this, Wright led a group of Cutler administration staff in overseeing the bombing of the church where Sergey Vodianov and his fiancé Elena Federova were to be married, killing everyone except the bride and groom.
- When running for president, Wright asked Natalia Belok to eliminate his main opponent in the primaries, which was accomplished by means of sabotaging her car, killing her husband and causing her to withdraw from the election and guaranteeing Wright's nomination. Wright would only realize afterwards that his conversation with Natalia had been recorded, giving the Beloks permanent leverage over him.
- During his time as president, he worked to enable Natalia's master plan of stealing the gold from the Federal Reserve Bank of New York. His Secret Service agents, loyal operatives of the Beloks, removed the gold bars and replaced them with painted clay duplicates, made from clay taken from a clay factory-turned-water treatment plant he bought through a shell company for his Chief of Staff's passion project. The gold was then transferred to a private prison Wright owns through another shell company, where the inmates worked to melt it down into buttons that the Beloks can then transfer discretely out of the country.
- When Elena Federova allows herself to be captured by the FBI as part of a larger plan to expose and eliminate the Beloks' operatives in the US government, Wright has her tortured to try and find the recording that Natalia has been blackmailing him with, which Elena had stolen from the Beloks.
- After Elena escapes and manages to ruin the attempt to get the gold out of the country, Wright is visited by Natalia, who reasserts her control over him by stabbing him in the hand and threatening him.

== Y ==
=== President Kenneth Jukichi Yamaoka ===
- President in: Eagle by Kaiji Kawaguchi
- Yamaoka is the 43rd president and is the first Asian-American president (third generation Japanese-American). He grew up in Washington state.
- Yamaoka was previously a member of the United States Marine Corps, serving during the Vietnam War. While stationed in Okinawa, he met bartender Tomiko Jo and embarked on a short relationship with her; they consummate their love before he leaves for Vietnam - promising to return. Unbeknownst to Yamaoka, Jo gave birth to his son; Takashi Jo.
- Recovering in a military hospital, Yamaoka determines to seek political office, accepting that he would fail to keep his promise to Tomiko. Yamaoka rose to become the junior senator for New York State, and married into a New England patrician family.
- Invites Takashi, who has become a journalist, to cover his campaign.
- Party: Democratic

=== President Yancy ===
- President in The Nomination.

=== President Anton York ===
- President in Gold Key Star Trek comic #9, "The Legacy of Lazarus"
- Served as the 45th president.
- A possible homage to the "Anton York, Immortal" stories by Earl and Otto Binder.

=== President Augustus Alvin York ===
- President in: The Zero Factor, a 1980 novel by William Oscar Johnson
- Nominated in Chicago as the Republican candidate for president when the 1980 convention becomes deadlocked between Ronald Reagan and other nominees. York is a compromise/sacrificial nomination.
- To everyone's surprise, York wins, but then becomes rather obsessed with the "Zero Factor" for presidents. All presidents elected in a year ending in Zero since 1840 have died in office. York fears he will be next.
- After multiple attempts on his life, York begins to suffer severe stress, and finally escapes the Zero Factor by resigning.
- Party: Republican

=== President John Young ===
- President in Messiah
- First Mormon to hold the office.
- Previously served in the United States Armed Forces.
- Is in office when an Iranian man calling himself al-Masih seemingly performs a series of miracles across the Middle East and amasses a following proclaiming him to be the second coming of Jesus Christ.
- Later meets with al-Masih, who tries to convince him to withdraw all US troops from everywhere globally to achieve world peace. Following the meeting he has The Pentagon draw up a study of potential consequences of withdrawal from Eastern Europe.
- White House Chief of Staff Cameron Collier goes behind President Young's back and works with the CIA to investigate and discredit al-Masih, believing he intends to cause global social disruption.
- Faces various other domestic and international crises during his administration, including severe flooding in Florida where he declares a federal state of emergency and Russian military escalation on the border with Latvia resulting in deployment of the United States Navy to the Baltic Sea.
- Portrayed by: Dermot Mulroney
- Political Party: Unspecified (implied to be Republican)

=== President Ursus Young ===
- President in Operator No. 5 volume #14 "Blood Reign of the Dictator"
- Governor of the fictional state of New Cornwall
- Abolishes the Constitution and declares himself dictator
- Guillotines his political enemies

=== President Young ===
- President in Space: Above and Beyond episode "Eyes".
- Assassinated by a silicate, an artificial life form, in 2051.
