= The Regiment (disambiguation) =

The Regiment is a nickname for the Special Air Service (SAS) unit of the British Army.

The Regiment may also refer to:

- The Regiment (TV series), British drama series produced by the BBC
- The Regiment (hip hop group), an American hip hop duo
- The Regiment (video game), a video game released in 2006
- The Regiment (novel), a novel by John Dalmas
- The 75th Ranger Regiment, a U.S. special operations force.

== See also ==
- Umkosi Wezintaba, "The Regiment of the Hills", a resistance movement in South Africa in the 1800s
