= List of fictional United States presidencies of historical figures (V–Z) =

Lists of fictional presidents of the United States
A–B	C–D	E–F
G–H	I–J	K–M
N–R	S–T	U–Z
Fictional presidencies of historical figures
A–B	C–D	E–G
H–J	K–L	M–O
P–R	S–U	V–Z

The following is a list of real or historical people who have been portrayed as President of the United States in fiction, although they did not hold the office in real life. This is done either as an alternate history scenario, or occasionally for humorous purposes. Also included are actual US presidents with a fictional presidency at a different time and/or under different circumstances than the one in actual history.

== V ==
=== Martin Van Buren ===
- In the alternate history novel For Want of a Nail: If Burgoyne Had Won at Saratoga by the business historian Robert Sobel, Martin Van Buren was the leader of the Northern Confederation's Conservative Party in the 1820s and the 1830s and was the governor of the Northern Confederation from 1825 to 1831. Unlike the Northern Confederation's Liberal Party, the Conservatives were poorly organized and had no basic political philosophy. Instead, they simply opposed Liberal policies. The Conservatives did have more popular support than the Liberals and they were able to gain a majority of seats on the Northern Confederation Council in the 1825 elections and Van Buren became governor. The Conservatives' manipulation of the banking system led to the Depression of 1829, which cost them their majority in the 1831 elections.

=== Clement Vallandigham ===
- In the alternate history novel "By Force of Arms" by Billy Bennett, Clement Vallandigham was elected President of the United States in the aftermath of the U.S. defeat in the American Civil War. His policy was one of appeasement towards the Confederate States of America in the hope of luring them back into the Union by diplomacy. His strategy was a disaster in that Jefferson Davis took advantage of Vallandigham's perceived weakness by invading and annexing the southern half of the disputed Arizona/New Mexico Territory. In the aftermath Vallandigham was defeated in the next Presidential election by William Tecumseh Sherman.
- Similar to the above, in Ward Moore's novel "Bring the Jubilee", the Confederacy wins the Battle of Gettysburg, wins its independence and imposes a humiliating peace on the rump United States, whereupon Clement Vallandigham wins the 1864 presidential election with the electorate turning sharply against the Republicans, held responsible for the disaster. However, Vallandigham's Presidency is haunted by economic crisis and galloping inflation, due to the reparations imposed by the victorious Confederacy. The US would be permanently crippled by the post-war crisis and left a backward country, and future generations would hold Vallandigham partially responsible.
- In The Difference Engine by William Gibson and Bruce Sterling, the invention of a functional analytical engine by Charles Babbage in 1824 results in the early arrival of the Information Age and the ascendancy of the British Empire as a world power. British interference in North America in order to prevent the rise of the United States as a global power results in its fragmentation into a rump United States, the Confederate States, the Texan Republic, the Californian Republic, the Manhattan Commune and a Native American-dominated 'terra nullius'. By 1870, Clement Vallandigham is mentioned as being the former Union president and acting as an uninhibited drunkard during a private dinner in London.

=== Arthur H. Vandenberg ===
- Arthur Vandenberg was president from 1941 to 1945 in the 1939 Robert A. Heinlein novel For Us, The Living: A Comedy of Customs.

=== Jesse Ventura ===
- Jesse Ventura is seen in the Futurama episodes "A Head in the Polls" and "All the Presidents' Heads" in the Hall of Presidents section inside the New New York Head Museum, implying that he served as president of either the United States or of Earth prior to the year 3000.

=== Kurt Vonnegut ===
- Kurt Vonnegut is president of the United Socialist States of America in Kim Newman and Eugene Byrne's Back in the USSA, serving as a parallel to Mikhail Gorbachev.

== W ==
=== George Wallace ===
- In Mona Clee's Branch Point (1996), George Wallace is elected president (with Curtis LeMay as his vice president) in 1968 after the assassinations of Robert F. Kennedy, Richard Nixon, Hubert Humphrey and Eugene McCarthy. In another alternate timeline in the same novel, George Wallace is elected as the 43rd President in 1996, succeeding Bill Clinton. The novel was published in January 1996, indicating that the author may have believed that Clinton would lose the 1996 election.
- He served one term (1977–1981) in the 1975 movie Tunnelvision, and was succeeded by an African-American woman named Washington.
- In the alternate history novel 11/22/63 by Stephen King, George Wallace was elected president in 1968 in an alternate timeline created when Jake Epping prevented the assassination of his predecessor, John F. Kennedy. Wallace escalated the Vietnam War into a nuclear war that precipitated numerous other atomic conflicts around the globe. On May 15, 1972, Wallace was assassinated by Arthur Bremer. He was succeeded by Vice President Curtis LeMay, who was defeated by Senator Hubert Humphrey of Minnesota in the 1972 Democratic primaries, winning in the 1972 election. Wallace's presidency was just one aspect of a denigrated timeline, far from the intentions of Epping or Al Templeton, the originator of the plot to save Kennedy.

=== Henry A. Wallace ===
- In the alternate history short story "News from the Front" by Harry Turtledove, Henry Wallace was serving as vice president under President Franklin D. Roosevelt at the time of the United States' entry into World War II on December 11, 1941, as he was in real life. From then onwards, Roosevelt faced harsh criticism from and strict scrutiny by the American press. The press attacked the Roosevelt administration for not being prepared for the attack on Pearl Harbor on December 7, 1941, as well as bringing on the attack by ignorantly imposing an oil embargo on the Empire of Japan. As the war progressed, the press began to constantly second-guess the Roosevelt administration and to ponder the value of the war. Furthermore, the press revealed important American military secrets, questioning the morality of spying on the Axis powers, decrying the poor state of American technology and giving away planned attacks days before there were to take place, leading to their failures. More importantly, the Battle of Midway (June 4–7, 1942) proved to be a complete disaster. During the first half of 1942, protests against the war began to appear throughout the country and a group of celebrities took it upon themselves to sail to Japan and Nazi Germany to offer peace. The British Prime Minister Winston Churchill faced similar problems in his own country. Matters came to a head when Vice President Wallace broke with the administration and publicly attacked Roosevelt's honesty and competence. Calls for impeachment grew louder throughout the United States and, finally, Congress began the impeachment process in June 1942. Although the story ends while Roosevelt is still president, it is heavily implied that he will be impeached and removed from office and that Wallace will succeed him as the 33rd President.
- The GURPS Infinite Worlds game include the timeline known as Lenin-1 in which Roosevelt maintained Wallace as his vice president when he was reelected in 1944; consequently Henry Wallace became president on April 12, 1945, upon Roosevelt's death. His passive stance (and that of his successors) against the Soviet Union resulted in the steady expansion of Communism across the globe. By 1989, the isolated and malaise-stricken United States is essentially the sole remaining capitalist country on the planet. Also resulting from Wallace becoming president in 1945 is the "Hell World" known as Lenin-2 where nuclear war and unconstrained industry have combined to crash the biosphere.
- Wallace also played an unfortunate role in the history of another unpleasant GURPS timeline, known as Reich-5. In this timeline Giuseppe Zangara succeeded in assassinating Franklin Delano Roosevelt in 1933. He was followed by Garner, Lindbergh and then Henry Wallace, who all proved unable to handle the Great Depression – finally leading to the far-right William Dudley Pelley being elected president in 1944, assuming dictatorial powers, and inviting the Nazis to conquer the US to help him against the pro-democracy resistance – ending with a totally Nazi-dominated world.
- Wallace becomes president after World War II in the 2000 AD strip Hope:... for the Future by Guy Adams, set in a film noir world where magic is real.

=== Earl Warren ===
- In the Colonization series by Harry Turtledove, Earl Warren served as President of the United States from 1961 to 1965. He was elected president in 1960 and would be re-elected in a landslide over his Democratic opponent Hubert Humphrey in 1964. He was in office when the Race's Colonization Fleet arrived at Earth in 1962 and ordered a secret attack using nuclear missiles fired from a satellite that destroyed a dozen of the Fleet's starships. President Warren concealed his role in the affair for several years but the information was ultimately leaked to the Race in 1965 by Sam Yeager through Shiplord Straha, despite Warren's best efforts to silence Yeager through draconian extralegal measures. Fleetlord Atvar threatened war with the United States. Having seen how quickly and easily the Race had defeated Germany in the short-lived Race-German of 1965, President Warren knew he must avoid a war at all costs. Atvar offered two other options: abandon all space exploration for the indefinite future or allow the Race to destroy an American city. Warren knew he that must choose one of the two lest his country be destroyed and he would not give up the space program, a sign of his country's might and technological prowess. Consequently, he surprised and disappointed Atvar by allowing him to destroy Indianapolis, Indiana. Warren then committed suicide in the Gray House, the presidential residence in Little Rock, Arkansas, and was succeeded by his vice president, Harold Stassen.

=== George Washington ===
- In a parallel universe featured in the short story "He Walked Around the Horses" by H. Beam Piper, General George Washington was killed in the Battle of Doylestown during the short-lived rebellion of the colonies in British North America in the 1770s. He died in the arms of Baron von Steuben. A seemingly insane individual who claimed to be a British diplomat named Benjamin Bathurst maintained that the American rebels were successful in their attempts to achieve independence and that Washington survived.
- In the short story "The Father of His Country" by Jody Lynn Nye contained in the anthology Alternate Presidents edited by Mike Resnick, George Washington ran against Benjamin Franklin in the first United States presidential election in 1789. In spite of the fact that Franklin was 83 years old and was rumored to have fathered numerous illegitimate children while serving as ambassador to France from 1778 to 1785, he was elected by the 1st United States Congress on April 6, 1789, in part due to reservations voiced by prominent members of Congress such as John Hancock and Charles Thomson regarding Washington. They were concerned that it would set a bad precedent for the first president to be a general. Furthermore, Franklin's supporters stressed that he was well liked and respected by foreign heads of state friendly to the United States, had been prominent in matters of diplomacy and government at home and abroad and had already proven that he had the best interests of the nation at heart. Franklin was inaugurated as the first President of the United States in Federal Hall in New York City on April 30, 1789. Franklin's vice president was John Adams who had supported Washington in Congress, as had his second cousin Samuel Adams. During his tenure in office, President Franklin attempted to create a more democratic society and managed to live longer than he did in real life, serving until at least 1792.
- In the alternate history novel The Two Georges by Harry Turtledove and Richard Dreyfuss, Colonel George Washington was part of a group of American colonists who met with King George III in the 1760s and were able to put in place an eleventh hour agreement with avoided revolution. Washington and the King were immortalized in a painting entitled The Two Georges by Thomas Gainsborough, which came to symbolize the friendship between the United Kingdom and the North American Union. In his later career as the Governor-general of the North American Union, Washington implemented a policy which halted the westward expansion of European settlement for some decades and gave a chance to certain Native American tribes such as the Iroquois and the Cherokee to modernize and keep much of their lands. For those reasons, he is greatly revered by Native Americans into the late-twentieth century. The Iroquois believed that he was the only white person to be admitted to their religion's version of Paradise. Conversely, he is considered a traitor by the Sons of Liberty, a nativist, separatist terrorist organization. He is also the namesake of the Province of Washington (analogous with Saskatchewan) and an NAU car marque.
- In Harry Turtledove's Southern Victory alternate history series, George Washington served as the first president from April 30, 1789, to March 4, 1797, as he was in real life. After the Confederate States of America achieved its independence in the War of Secession (1861–1862), U.S. historians continued to so regard Washington, alongside Thomas Jefferson, Abraham Lincoln and Theodore Roosevelt as the most memorable of presidents, though only Roosevelt was viewed in an entirely positive light. As a young man, Roosevelt admired Washington as a great leader. However, the general public did not always remembered kindly. Washington came from Virginia, and after the War of Secession his popularity in the US suffered because of it – as did that of Thomas Jefferson and James Madison. Northern people in general preferred to remember Northern Founding Fathers such as John Adams, Alexander Hamilton and Benjamin Franklin (whose picture appeared on stamps issued by the US occupation authorities in Canada). Nonetheless, the US rebuilt the Washington Monument after it was destroyed during the Great War (1914–1917). The Confederates were themselves saddened of the monument being destroyed in the war as well, as they were fond of George Washington, too. In fact, before 1920, the Confederacy esteemed Washington as a Founding Father as well but generally preferred their own founding fathers such as John C. Calhoun, Jefferson Davis and Robert E. Lee. The Freedom Party in its earliest phase, while still under Anthony Dresser, used Washington's picture as an emblem, with the slogan, "We need a New Revolution". Jake Featherston, who considered Washington to have "sold out the South to the damnyankees" stopped that custom when he took over the party. Many Confederates did view Washington with some suspicion in the years after the Great War, but still thought of him as a Virginian first and as President of the United States second. Washington University in Lexington, Virginia, home of the Confederacy's effort to build a superbomb, retained its name and the statue of Washington that stood in the Confederate capital of Richmond, Virginia, survived both Great Wars. Following the Second Great War, with the Confederacy dissolved and annexed by the United States, statues of Washington are left standing whilst those of key Confederate figures such as Albert Sidney Johnston are removed by US occupation forces.
- In Michael Flynn's novella The Forest of Time, in the late 1780s General George Washington took a personal interest in the Pennamite–Yankee Wars – i.e. the violent conflict between Pennamites from Pennsylvania and Yankees from Connecticut, both of whom laid claim to the Wyoming Valley and sent rival groups of settlers to it. In a fatally misguided step, Washington placed a unit of the Virginia Militia, commanded by himself, as a neutral buffer between Pennamites and Yankees. This culminated with the Virginians being trapped and decimated in a crossfire, Washington himself being among those killed. When the news of Washington's death reached Philadelphia, where the Constitutional Convention was just convening, Benjamin Franklin suffered a stroke and died, too. The convention broke up in consternation, and the Constitution of the United States was never adopted and a Federal Government never created. The loose structure of the Continental Congress eventually disintegrated, with the Thirteen Colonies going each its own way as full-fledged nation states – except that the Yankees of New England did create their own more narrow confederation. In this situation, Yankee settlers – backed by the rest of New England – held on to much of the Wyoming Valley, their conflict with Pennsylvania further escalating. Eventually, two mutually hostile nation states emerged, possessing fully equipped regular armies – hereditary enemies which habitually and repeatedly go to war with each other. Posterity remembered George Washington as a talented general who won what was remembered as The War Against the British. However, that war itself was remembered only as a temporary and ephemeral alliance, whose participants later often went to war with each other. Washington having been a Virginian, most people in North America thought of him as a foreigner and people in Virginia's neighbors thought of him as having been from an enemy country.
- People in that history, speculating about "what might have been", fantasized that, had he survived, Washington might have made himself King of America and appointed Franklin as his prime minister, the two of them then launching a massive westward expansion of their Empire.
- In the North American Confederacy Series novel The Probability Broach by L. Neil Smith, the Whiskey Rebellion succeeds after Albert Gallatin intercedes to help the farmers rather than the fledgling United States government as he does in reality. This results in the rebellion becoming a Second American Revolution and eventually leads to George Washington being overthrown and executed by firing squad for treason in 1794 and the United States Government being reformed. This included the Constitution being declared null and void, a new caretaker government being organized with all taxes being repelled in 1795, and the Articles of Confederation being revised with a much emphasis on individual freedom in 1797. After the war, Gallatin would serve as the 2nd and 7th president from 1794 to 1812 and from 1836 to 1840 with his actions later starting a libertarian state known as the North American Confederacy in 1893. Despite this, Gallatin insisted that historians would still count George Washington as the first president.
- In the novel Tunnel Through the Deeps by Harry Harrison, in which the United States lost the American Revolution, Washington was executed for treason. America remained under control of the British Empire well into the 20th century. Washington's descendant, a gifted engineer still living in the ancestral Mount Vernon, undertakes the stupendous project of a tunnel under the Atlantic which would bind America closer than ever to Britain.
- In the alternate history series The Tales of Alvin Maker by Orson Scott Card, George Washington is mentioned as "Lord Potomac", who served under the English crown during the alternate version of the American Revolution. However, he surrendered his army and was beheaded for treason.
- In the novel Washington's Dirigible (part of the Timeline Wars series by John Barnes), a colossal war is raging across countless alternate history timelines, between a progressive timeline originating from a surviving Periclean Athens and an extremely oppressive slave society resulting from a Carthaginian victory over Rome. The Athenians send an agent to the 18th century who creates a new timeline by getting Benjamin Franklin appointed as the tutor of the young King George III, resulting in making him a Liberal King, sympathetic to the aspirations of the North American colonists; also, many technologies and devices are introduced into the 18th century, such as railways, dirigibles, radio and electricity (as well as flush toilets). However, the Carthaginian "Closers" intervene, kidnapping the King and replace him by an authoritarian impostor. George Washington becomes aware of the situation and takes a major part in the struggle to save the rightful King George III and restore him to the throne, eventually setting the world back on the route to a progressive and forward-looking British Empire. Finding out that the Carthaginian "Closers" had plotted to make everybody in the world into slaves, regardless of skin color, makes Washington into an opponent of slavery and he emancipates his own Black slaves and hires them as free servants. Seeing things going well in his own world and no need to create the United States, Washington becomes a full time agent of the Athenians, undertaking dangerous missions at various alternate history timelines. Instead of becoming "Father of His Country", George Washington becomes the "father" of various countries in various histories which he helped free from the oppression of the "Closers".
- In the SCP Foundation entry SCP-2776 – Mr. President, Virginia Colonel George Washington died of dysentery in July 1755, following the Battle of the Monongahela. Washington's body was smuggled overseas into France where a scientist by the name of Dr. Jean Durand repurposed the corpse into an android with the original Washington's memories prior to his illness, and was equipped with nuclear weaponry and laser armaments in the event the Thirteen Colonies needed to be defended against overwhelming odds. Durand's assistant, Martha Custis, became the oblivious android Washington's wife to serve as its mechanic. The android lived Washington's life as known in history until its "death" in 1799, remaining deactivated until it was rediscovered in 2007 by the SCP Foundation and catalogued as SCP-2776. In 2009, SCP-2776 violently broke containment upon overhearing news about a recent buyout of an American telecom company by a British media company; perceiving this as the British Empire's conquest of the United States, SCP-2776 attempted to cross the Atlantic Ocean in order to destroy London. After killing nearly two hundred SCP Foundation staff, SCP-2776 was critically damaged, incapacitated, and transferred to a new facility.

=== Adam Weishaupt ===
- Adam Weishaupt is the first president in The Illuminatus! Trilogy by Robert Shea and Robert Anton Wilson, after murdering and taking the identity of George Washington.

=== Kanye West ===
- In the song "Black Friday" by Kendrick Lamar, Lamar envisions a future where West becomes president. Under West's presidency, Kendrick would be allowed to receive oral sex in the Oval Office and play West's debut album The College Dropout inside of the White House.

=== Burton K. Wheeler ===
- In the alternate history novel The Plot Against America by Philip Roth, Burton Wheeler succeeded Charles Lindbergh as the 33rd president in 1942. Wheeler was Lindbergh's running mate in the 1940 election, elected as vice president on an Isolationist ticket. Following Lindbergh's disappearance, he serves as president for eight days, a period marked by martial law and anti-Semitic rioting. Wheeler is eventually impeached but ultimately pardoned by Franklin Roosevelt (elected in an emergency presidential election concurrent with the 1942 midterm elections).
- In The Divide by William Overgard, Burton Wheeler, running as the Isolationist Party candidate, defeats President Franklin D. Roosevelt in 1940 on a pledge to keep America out of war after the Nazis force the surrender of the United Kingdom and France. After Germany has overrun all of Russia, both Germany and Japan attack and invade the United States in 1941. President Wheeler surrenders the United States to the Axis after a devastating bombardment of missiles from occupied Canada. The surrender takes place on April 20, 1948, Adolf Hitler's fifty ninth birthday. President Wheeler, Army Chief of Staff General George Marshall, and other U.S. Government officials are executed by garrote in a meat packing plant outside of Washington, D.C., after being found guilty of war crimes. Wheeler does leave behind a secret installation where work of producing an atomic bomb continues, in the hope that it would eventually help in liberating the country.
- In the short story "Fighting Bob" by Kristine Kathryn Rusch contained in the anthology Alternate Presidents edited by Mike Resnick, Robert M. La Follette, Sr. won the 1924 election with Burton Wheeler as his running mate. La Follette was the Progressive Party candidate, defeating the Republican incumbent Calvin Coolidge and their Democratic opponent John W. Davis. He entered office as the 31st President on March 4, 1925. However, President La Follette's term in office proved to be short-lived as he died on June 18, 1925 (as he did in real life). Wheeler succeeded him as the 32nd President.

=== Harrison A. Williams ===
- Harrison Williams was a president in the 1960s in the timeline of Robert A. Heinlein's "Double Star". Not much information is given, as this is an event of the distant past for the book's protagonists. In 1956, when Heinlein wrote the book, Williams was a rising young politician, recently elected to the House of Representatives at the age of 34, and the idea of his finally achieving the presidency was a reasonable conjecture.

=== Wendell Willkie ===
- Wendell Willkie was elected president in 1940 (when Franklin D. Roosevelt decided to not seek a third term) in the S. M. Stirling novel Marching Through Georgia. He led the United States into involvement in World War II. His vice president was Charles L. McNary.

=== Woodrow Wilson ===
- In the alternate history short story "The Bull Moose at Bay" by Mike Resnick contained in his edited anthology Alternate Presidents, Roosevelt was the subject of an assassination attempt carried out by John Flammang Schrank in Milwaukee, Wisconsin, on October 14, 1912, as he was in reality. Whereas he was shot in the chest on that occasion in real life, Schrank's bullet missed him in the story. Running as the Progressive Party candidate, Roosevelt went on to defeat both Woodrow Wilson and the extremely unpopular incumbent Republican president William Howard Taft in the 1912 election. Shortly after the sinking of the passenger liner RMS Lusitania by the German U-boat U-20 on May 7, 1915, President Roosevelt brought the United States into the Great War, resulting in the defeat of the German Empire by the US and its allies within less than a year. This made the United States a world power. In spite of this and the fact that the economy was experiencing a boom, Roosevelt was widely expected to lose the 1916 election to Wilson. Although the story ends prior to the election, it is heavily implied that Wilson will indeed be elected and therefore take office as the 29th president on March 4, 1917.
- In the short story "Ten Days That Shook the World" by Kim Newman and Eugene Byrne contained in the anthology Back in the USSA, Woodrow Wilson was defeated in the 1912 election by former president Theodore Roosevelt, the Progressive Party candidate. Roosevelt became the last democratically elected President of the United States. Before he could take office, however, Roosevelt was assassinated in Chicago, Illinois, on December 19, 1912, by the sharpshooter and exhibition shooter Annie Oakley while attempting to break up a labor strike with the help of the Rough Riders at the Chicago Union Stockyards. Consequently, Vice President-elect Charles Foster Kane, an extremely wealthy newspaper mogul, was inaugurated as the 28th President on March 4, 1913. During his presidency, Kane led the United States into greater levels of oppression, class division and bureaucratic incompetence and corruption. President Kane rigged the 1916, defeating Wilson and the Republican candidate former president William Howard Taft as Roosevelt had done in 1912. By February 1917, Wilson had been assassinated and many believed that Kane's agents were responsible. Wilson came to be regarded as a martyr by those opposed to Kane's regime. The Socialist Party of America, led by Eugene V. Debs, gained considerable report among the disenfranchised populace and soon the unrest led to outright Second American Civil War. After the storming of the White House by the Socialist faction on July 4, 1917, Kane was shot and killed by Oakley, as Roosevelt had been four and a half years earlier. This resulted in the establishment of the United Socialist States of America (USSA) with Debs as its first president.
- In Harry Turtledove's Southern Victory alternate history series, Woodrow Wilson served as the 9th President of the Confederate States from 1910 to 1916, serving the maximum one term prescribed by the Constitution of the Confederate States, and led the country into the Great War (1914–1917). Following the Archduke Franz Ferdinand of Austria's assassination in Sarajevo on June 28, 1914, President Wilson affirmed the commitment of the Confederate States of America to the Quadruple Entente with the United Kingdom, the France and the Russia, describing the conflict between Austria-Hungary and Serbia as a case of a smaller nation being oppressed by a larger one. In his speech rallying the nation to war, Wilson reminded the Confederate people of the crucial role which Britain and France had played in the CSA's achievement of independence during the War of Secession (1861–1862) as well as their importance to its continued survival. He called upon the Confederate States to stand up against the "tyrannical" German Empire and the "bitter" United States, reminding the crowd of the "dark path" which the US had followed and that it was the CSA's duty to be a continuing force for freedom in the world by entering the war. By the middle of 1915, the Great War, expected to be over by the previous Christmas, had settled into a bloody stalemate in both North America and Western Europe. With only a few months left before the CS presidential election, Wilson was a lame duck. Nevertheless, he continued to rally the Confederate States while at the same time campaigning for his vice president Gabriel Semmes, the Whig Party presidential candidate. By this time, certain quarters were of the opinion that Wilson had not prosecuted the war as vigorously as he could have. President Wilson left office on March 4, 1916, and was succeeded by Semmes as the 10th president. In September 1917, the Great War ended with the defeat of the Confederate States and its allies. Wilson lived the remainder of his life in relative obscurity. Following his death in 1924, he was buried in Richmond, Virginia, and was remembered with a certain fondness by later generations in the CS.
- In the alternate history novel 1920: America's Great War by Robert Conroy, Woodrow Wilson is running for a third term in the 1920 election despite being bedridden. He has been praised for bringing peace to Europe as he acted as mediator for the Treaty of Princeton, and has since enacted strong isolationist policies in the U.S. and making budget cuts from the U.S. military, thinking that the world is finally at everlasting peace. However, the German Empire has greatly expanded its military influence almost unopposed across the world due to the reparations and military restrictions imposed on the Entente nations, which lost World War I in 1914. German Emperor Kaiser Wilhelm II sees the United States as the only remaining nation that can threaten Germany, and has prepared a plan for war. By aiding the German-friendly revolutionary forces of Venustiano Carranza, Mexico's government is overthrown and becomes a German ally. Mexico is then to be used as a staging point to launch a joint German-Mexican surprise invasion into the Southwestern United States with the goal of the Germans to gain the vast natural resources the Empire needs while Mexico tries to re-annex territory lost to the United States. After it is found that Wilson has died in his sleep, Vice President Thomas R. Marshall is next in the chain of succession but formally steps down for not wanting the responsibility, and thus Secretary of State Robert Lansing is sworn in instead. President Lansing is fully aware of the threat of invasion from Mexico and has the U.S. military desperately scramble a defense, but comes too little to late as the German Army crosses the border into California and the Mexican Army crosses the Rio Grande into Texas.
- In the 2013 alternative history docudrama The Great Martian War 1913–1917, based on The War of the Worlds by H. G. Wells, Woodrow Wilson attempts to maintain American isolationism during a conflict in Western Europe between the Great Powers of Europe and invading alien forces thought to be from Mars. Although Wilson sends aid to the beleaguered European alliance, he loses the 1916 election to former president Theodore Roosevelt, who had been organizing American volunteer forces for the human war effort.

=== Oprah Winfrey ===
- In short-lived science-fiction legal drama Century City, Oprah Winfrey was mentioned as being president in 2030. Her Vice President is an openly gay, retired, one-armed, four-star U.S. armed forces general. By the time of her presidency, two additional states have been admitted to the United States, the Moon has been colonized, and the US has adopted free universal healthcare.
- In the alternate history episode of The Boondocks Return of the King, Oprah Winfrey is elected president in 2020 around the same time Martin Luther King Jr. (who survived his assassination attempt in 1968) died in Vancouver, British Columbia, at the age of 91.

=== Ed Wood ===
- In a parallel universe featured in the Sliders Season Two premiere "Into the Mystic" in which the United States was ruled by a commercial empire run by a mysterious sorcerer, Ed Wood served as president prior to 1996, by which time he had died. He was considered one of the greatest Presidents in US history.

=== Victoria Woodhull ===
- In the alternate history short story "We are Not Amused" by Laura Resnick contained in the anthology Alternate Presidents edited by Mike Resnick, Victoria Woodhull was elected as the 19th President in 1872, defeating her Democratic opponent Horace Greeley after a constitutional amendment restricted her predecessor Ulysses S. Grant to one term. President Woodhull, the first woman to hold the office, ran for the Equal Rights Party with the former slave and prominent abolitionist Frederick Douglass as her running mate. Consequently, Douglass became the first African American to hold the office of Vice President. Shortly after her election, Woodhull began a correspondence with her namesake, the British monarch Queen Victoria. Although the Queen was pleased to hear that President Woodhull had been acquitted of obscenity charges, she expressed dismay at the president's decision to appoint her younger sister Tennessee Celeste Claflin as Surgeon General, given that her medical practices had led to her being indicted for manslaughter in 1864. Furthermore, the Queen was both shocked and bewildered to learn that President Woodhull was in fact married to Colonel James Blood and not Canning Woodhull as she had previously believed. In spite of this, the president's former husband lived with her and her second husband in the White House. Given this complicated arrangement, Queen Victoria agreed with Woodhull's assessment that it would be wiser to accept advice from neither of her husbands for the time being. As time passed, however, the Queen began to greatly disapprove of the so-called reforms being implemented by the Woodhull administration. She took particular umbrage with the concept of free love, believing that it would lead to the breakdown of the family, and the proposed legalization of prostitution. While the Queen acknowledged that she could not prevent President Woodhull from following this course of action, she firmly resisted the president's attempts to convince her to adopt these positions herself. Queen Victoria was equally contemptuous of the Secretary of Reproductive Freedom's mandate to supervise research and legislation regarding abortion and birth control. She also expressed dismay at the attire of the new American ambassador to the Court of St. James as her short skirt exposed a considerable portion of her limbs, which the Queen claimed caused the prime minister William Ewart Gladstone great excitement. Within several years, the changing morals and mores of American society spread to the British Empire and even to the Royal Family itself. In 1875, Queen Victoria's eldest son and heir apparent Albert, Prince of Wales abandoned his wife Princess Alexandra as he had chosen to practice free love in the American manner, which he regarded as "a charming and thoroughly civilized custom." For her part, Princess Alexandra objected until being informed by the American ambassador that free love was her right as well. This led to the Princess becoming the constant companion of Alfred, Lord Tennyson, whose more recent work lacked the moral character for which he had previously been known. The Queen's youngest daughters, Princess Louise and Princess Beatrice, habitually wore the style of short skirt worn by American representatives at court. Thousands upon thousands of young women soon followed suit, many of them establishing "rebellious musical groups which [played] Spanish and African instruments." The Duke of York's eldest son left home to live with the Native American tribes which were beginning to settle in the eastern United States whereas young men in Trafalgar Square had begun wearing their hair in the style of the Mohawk people and protesting the British government's involvement in India and South Africa. women's suffrage was becoming a major political issue with women besieging 10 Downing Street on a daily basis demanding not only the right to vote but the right to apply for men's jobs and earn equal wages and the right to paid maternity leave. This had led to widespread factory strikes across the United Kingdom. Furthermore, factories all over the UK had come to a standstill as workers demanded safer working conditions. Prostitutes took to parading up and down Piccadilly Circus in "most indecent attire," demanding that the government recognize and protect their places of employment. The Queen secluded herself within the walls of Windsor Castle for six months in the hope that the situation would improve, though Gladstone believed that this downward spiral would continue for years to come. However, he assured his supporters that Britain would never have a female Prime Minister. The Queen was particularly upset to learn that her "once dear friend" Empress Augusta of the German Empire had taken to wearing a short skirt and was an adherent of President Woodhull's theory of a woman's right to orgasm. Queen Victoria held the president entirely responsible for what she perceived as the downfall of civilization, the chaos overwhelming Britain and Europe, the alienation of her sons and the disgrace of her daughters. After serving the maximum one term prescribed by law, President Woodhull left office on March 4, 1877. Her daughter Zula Maud Woodhull subsequently served as Attorney General from 1904 to 1908. Queen Victoria's letters to President Woodhull were included in A Correspondence Between the Victorias: An Insight into the Decline of Victorianism, 1872–1880, written by the latter's descendant Dr. Wiantha Woodhull and published by Femme Fatale Press in 1992.

== Y ==
=== Ralph Yarborough ===
- Ralph Yarborough was Robert F. Kennedy's successor as president in Mitchell J. Freedman's novel A Disturbance of Fate. He serves two terms and subsequently is killed during the events of the "Second Civil War".
