= List of fictional presidents of the United States (I–J) =

Lists of fictional presidents of the United States
A–B	C–D	E–F
G–H	I–J	K–M
N–R	S–T	U–Z
Fictional presidencies of historical figures
A–B	C–D	E–G
H–J	K–L	M–O
P–R	S–U	V–Z

The following is a list of fictional presidents of the United States, I through J.

== I ==
=== President Ingstrom ===
- President in: Freedom (TV series)
- A war breaks out in the Middle East during his term.
- Ingstrom disappears after Air Force One crashes, causing a military government to form in the United States.

=== President Itchy ===
- President in: Itchy and Scratchy (The Simpsons Movie)
- After Itchy returns home from the Moon, he is regarded as a hero and is elected president in 2008.
- Hillary Clinton was his vice president.

=== President ===
- President in: Iron Sky and Iron Sky: The Coming Race
- The President in Iron Sky was a parody of Sarah Palin who's determent to get re-elected at any cost. When the Moon Nazis invade Earth, the United States and their Allies defeat them only to start World War III shortly afterwards when they discover Helium 3 on the Moon. In Iron Sky: The Coming Race it's reviled she is a member of the Vril, a race of Reptilians that arrived on Earth during the age of the dinosaurs. She is killed by her fellow Vril for turning the Earth's surface into a nuclear wasteland.
- Portrayed by Stephanie Paul
- Political party Republican

== J ==
=== President Jackson ===
- President in: Lash-Up (novel, 2015) by Larry Bond
- President 2017 during war with China in which US military is hampered by Chinese destruction of GPS satellites.
- Establishes United States Space Force to defend American space assets.
- Party: Democratic

=== President Lucas Jacobs ===
- President in: Independence Day: Crucible, tie-in novel bridging Independence Day and Independence Day: Resurgence
- 44th President of the United States who served from 2005 to 2013, succeeding William Grey.
- Former senator and United States Army lieutenant general.
- Succeeded by his own Vice President Elizabeth Lanford.
- First African-American to be elected president.

=== President Lee Alexander James ===
- President in: Dead Heat (novel) by Joel C. Rosenberg
- Was Vice President under President William Harvard Oaks before becoming the president after Oaks is assassinated by his aide in NORAD. James was formerly the Secretary of Homeland Security.

=== President Bruce Jansen ===
- President in: The Washington Decree (novel, 2006) by Jussi Adler-Olsen
- Former governor and senator of Virginia.
- He becomes mentally unstable after his second wife, First Lady Mimi Todd Jansen, is assassinated shortly after his inauguration.
- Proposes the Washington Decrees—a series of laws that allow the expansion of public surveillance, media control, and restrictions of personal freedom rights of the American people under the First Amendment.
- Turns the United States into a dictatorship, before a military coup causes a new Civil War and he is brought down by the members of his own government.
- Is replaced by his vice president, Michael T. Lerner.

=== President William Jarman ===
- President in: Shadowrun
- Presidential terms: 2017–2021, 2021–2025, and 2025–2029.
- 46th US President.
- Served as vice president under President Jesse Garrety.
- Sworn in as President after Garrety's assassination 100 days before the end of his second term. Jarman's first term was 100 days longer than normal as he replaced Garrety after the latter's assassination.
- Term limits are repealed by the 29th Amendment during Jarman's second term.
- Defeated in 2030 election by Andrew McAlister.

=== President Raymond Jarvis ===
- President in: The Event (TV series)
- Was vice president under President Elias Martinez and becomes acting president under the terms of the 25th Amendment after he slips poison into Martinez's coffee under orders from the extraterrestrials' leader.
- Played by Bill Smitrovich

=== President Edward Montoya Jason ===
- President in: Come Nineveh, Come Tyre (novel) by Allen Drury
- Early in his administration, the United States government is overthrown by a Soviet conspiracy, mostly because of Jason's naivete and incompetence.
- Commits suicide when the consequences of his actions become clear.

=== President Theodore "Teddy" Jay ===
- President in: Father's Day (novel, 1994) by John Calvin Batchlor
- Former governor from Michigan, elected in 2000
- Steps down under the 25th Amendment after suffering a nervous breakdown in 2002.
- After learning his Vice President T. E. Garland is plotting a military coup against him, he suffers a stroke while swimming.
- Party: Democratic

=== President Censor Jennings ===
- President in: A Different Flesh (short stories) by Harry Turtledove
- In an alternate timeline where Homo erectus (called "sims") and megafauna from the Pleistocene era survived in the Western Hemisphere, Britain's American colonies seceded earlier in 1738 to form the Federated Commonwealths of America. The constitution of the Federated Commonwealths is modelled more on the Roman Republic than that of the real-life United States, with the country being governed by two chief executives (censors) who can veto each other as well as life-long-serving senators.
- Serving as one of the two censors in 1988, Jennings vetoes Censor Bryan's order of an investigation into the handling of a riot by sims' rights activists protesting the use of sims in HIV research.

=== President Jimble ===
- President in: Smiling Friends (TV series, episode "Mr. President")
- Played by: Mike Bocchetti
- Was vice president to President Pinhead until a month before the presidential election, succeeding via the 25th Amendment after Pinhead died of food poisoning from shrimp.
- Favorite food is lamb barbeque.
- Wears an adult diaper after defecating himself on stage while campaigning in Pennsylvania.
- Crashed the economy of the United States after promising to give US$1 billion to every citizen in an attempt to win favor as "the money president".
- Inadvertently commended the genocidal dictator of the fictional country of Blingostan under the belief he was an ally to the United States.
- Lost reelection to Mr. Frog by one vote from Pennsylvania.

=== President James Johnson ===
- President in: Metal Gear Solid 2: Sons of Liberty
- The 44th President, preceded by President George Sears (Solidus Snake). After Sears "resigns" after the events of Metal Gear Solid, James Johnson, the son of a former senator, is nominated for election and won; Johnson claims the election was a farce and that he is a figurehead for The Patriots, a secret group that controls the United States and decides the elections. During the events of the Plant chapter, Johnson is assassinated by Revolver Ocelot for his unwilling involvement in the S3 Plan.

=== President William Johnson ===
- President in: The First Family (TV series)
- The 45th president, and the second African-American to hold the office
- Played by: Christopher B. Duncan

=== President Arthur Jones ===
- President in: The Case of the President (novel) by Marc Elsberg
- During his re-election campaign, his predecessor Douglas Turner is arrested in Athens, Greece, by the International Criminal Court (ICC) for committing illegal drone strikes in Syria.
- Not wanting a scandal to hurt his chances for a second term, Jones makes threats against the ICC and all member states of the European Union to prevent Turner from being convicted.
- Instructs his intelligence services to find and eliminate the most important witness in the case, an anonymous whistleblower.

=== President Rufus Jones ===
- President in: Rufus Jones for President (movie, 1933)
- Played by: Sammy Davis Jr.

=== President Maria Juarez ===
- President in: The Light of Other Days
- She is the first female President of the United States.
- Presidential term 2037–2041.
- Her party is accused of "playing dirty tricks" against Juarez's party headquarters.
