= List of fictional presidents of the United States (E–F) =

Lists of fictional presidents of the United States
A–B	C–D	E–F
G–H	I–J	K–M
N–R	S–T	U–Z
Fictional presidencies of historical figures
A–B	C–D	E–G
H–J	K–L	M–O
P–R	S–U	V–Z

The following is a list of fictional presidents of the United States, E through F.

== E ==
=== President Emmett Earnshaw ===
- President in: The Plot by Irving Wallace
- Serves one term and decides not to run for re-election.

=== President Matthew Easton ===
- President in: Sunflower by Marilyn Sharpe.
- His daughter Anna is kidnapped during his term.

=== President Sarah Susan Eckert ===
- President in: Star Trek V: The Final Frontier (novelization by J.M. Dillard)
- Dillard's novelization refers to Eckert as "the first black Northam president".

=== President Thomas Eckhart ===
- President in: Agent X
- Played by: John Shea

=== President Thomas Eckhart ===
- President in: Fallout 76
- President of the Enclave's Appalachian detachment from 2083 - 2086, killed by a ruptured toxin tank.
- 9th in line to presidency prior to nuclear war, served as Secretary of Agriculture.
- Elected president after reprogramming voting machines.

=== President John Henry Eden ===
- President in: Fallout 3
- Leader of the Enclave, the last remnant of the US government after a worldwide nuclear apocalypse, after President Dick Richardson is killed. Like Richardson, he is never actually elected, but he promises true elections and a brighter future for the wastelands of America in a radio broadcast.
- Eden is not a human being, but an AI based on the ZAX supercomputer.
- Played by: Malcolm McDowell

=== President Edwards ===
- President in: The Lords Day by Michael Dobbs
- First woman elected to the office and third member of her family to have occupied the White House.
- Her son William-Henry Harrison Edwards, a Rhodes Scholar at Oxford University, attends the State Opening of Parliament when it is attacked by terrorists.

=== President Russell Eigenblick ===
- President in: Little, Big
- A charismatic despot and the reincarnation of Frederick Barbarossa

=== President Ellis ===
- President in: The Eleven Million Mile High Dancer by Carol Hill
- In office in the mid-1980s
- Nicknamed "Daddy Ice" due to his apathetic crisis responses and fondness for naps.
- Encounters issues including bizarre global weather, severe environmental problems, the disappearance of a Mars-bound astronaut, and ten thousand Native Americans vanishing from Cononga County, Texas, and reappearing in the Pentagon basement.

=== President Andrew Ellis ===
- President in: Tom Clancy's The Division 2
- Former Speaker of the House and third in line for the presidency
- Assumes power after the deaths of the two previous presidents during the Green Poison crisis depicted in Tom Clancy's The Division.
- Secretly associated with and propped up by a mysterious cabal that runs the Black Tusk Special Unit, a paramilitary group that invades Washington, D.C.
- After being rescued from a Hyena gang by Division agents, Ellis betrays the remnants of the pre-pandemic government by handing over a broad-spectrum antiviral to Black Tusk.

=== President Calvin Ellis ===
- President in: Earth 23
- Kryptonian from an alternate universe

=== President Matthew Ellis ===
- President in: Marvel Cinematic Universe
- Is quoted as welcoming Captain America back to the world at the Captain America exhibit at the Smithsonian Institution.
- Ellis is abducted by AIM leader Aldrich Killian (Guy Pearce) in an elaborate scheme to execute him for his collaborator, Vice President Rodriguez (Miguel Ferrer), to become the new president while Killian continues to profit through customized terrorism. Killian's plans are thwarted by Tony Stark, while Colonel James Rhodes takes Ellis to safety.
- Targeted for assassination by Hydra via Project Insight Helicarrier air strike based on Arnim Zola's algorithm that determines his future actions run counter to Hydra's agenda.
- Ellis announces and recaps the events of New York, London, Sokovia and the recent rise of the Inhumans to the world, authorizes the formation of the Advanced Threat Containment Unit, which is instructed to contain potential threats caused by people with superpowers.
- Agrees to provide support for S.H.I.E.L.D. to come out of the shadows and be re-established, on condition that Phil Coulson steps down as director.
- Played by: William Sadler

=== President Walter Emerson ===
- President in: Deterrence
- Played by: Kevin Pollak
- After the elected vice president resigned, Emerson was confirmed with the minority support of the electorate. The previous president dies of natural causes, elevating Emerson.
- Administration officials include; National Security Advisor Gayle Redford, Chief of Staff Marshall Thompson, Secretary of Defense Don Hancock, Secretary of State Deborah Cleft and Chairman of the Joint Chiefs General Frank Lancaster.
- Initially seeking his party's nomination in the next primary, having selected Senate President pro tempore Theodore Slater of Wyoming as his vice presidential nominee, he drops out after ordering a nuclear strike on Baghdad after Iraqi President Uday Hussein has the Republican Guard invade Kuwait.

=== President Sven Ericson ===
- President in the novel Full Disclosure by William Safire
- Ericson is blinded during the assassination of the USSR leader. It is revealed that the then-candidate had suffered temporary blindness during his campaign, and it was decided not to disclose this. Attempts are made to remove the president from office.

=== President Jackson Evans ===
- President in: The Contender
- A former senator who attended West Point and enjoys cigars and shark steak sandwiches. Evans is a two-term Democratic president who sought to replace his deceased vice president, Troy Ellerd, with Senator Laine Hanson (D-Ohio) to succeed him.
- Played by: Jeff Bridges
- Party: Democratic

=== President J. R. Ewing ===
- President in: Back in the USSA
- Ewing becomes President of the Confederation of Independent North American States in 1992 after the collapse of the Communist regime of the United Socialist States of America. He is still the president in 1998, although severely weakened (both politically and physically) following a 1996 assassination attempt. It is mentioned that his being president is the only thing preventing the secession of Texas. A number of military officers including Colin Powell and Nick Fury are said to scheme to overthrow him in a coup.

== F ==
=== President Simon Faircliffe ===
- President in The President's Man by Nicholas Guild (1982 novel)
- Former U.S. Senator
- Faircliffe is secretly assassinated by the CIA director when it is discovered the latter is a traitor.

=== President Artemis N. Falkmore ===
- Fictional president mentioned by George Costanza in the Seinfeld episode "The Van Buren Boys". When Jerry Seinfeld asks George who the last president to have a beard was, George makes up the name Artemis N. Falkmore.

=== President Harold Farkley ===
- President in: No Way to Treat a First Lady

President Fellwick

- President in: Atomic Train
- Played by Edward Herrmann

=== President Julian Felsenburgh ===
- President in Lord of the World
- In the early 21st century, Senator Julian Felsenburgh travels across Europe, the Middle East, and the Far East to bring peace and unify the world. He manages to avert at the very last moment a seemingly inevitable devastating war between the European Confederation and the Sino-Japanese Eastern Empire. He is hailed as the Mahdi by Muslims. Felsenburgh eventually became President of both the US and United Europe, and his rule was accepted by all countries of the world, being granted "a position hitherto undreamed of in democracy" – "a House of Government in every capital in the world, a final veto lasting three years on every motion submitted to him, and a legal power granted to every motion he submits on three consecutive years". Felsenburgh then persecutes all religious people, particularly Catholics. In London, atheist mobs instigate large-scale pogroms of Catholics, killing them while the police – on Felsenburgh's instructions – stand aside. The same is repeated in numerous other places. Commanding a fleet of "volors" (dirigibles), Felsenburgh orders the firebombing and complete destruction of Rome to extirpate the Catholic Church. Felsenburgh is revealed to be the Antichrist, and he orders every person in the world to choose between denying the existence of God or instant death. Felsenburgh personally oversees the firebombing of Nazareth, where the last remaining Catholics have gathered to elect a new Pope, but God intervenes and brings about the end of the world.

=== President T.C. Fenton ===
- President in: The Man
- Killed along with the Speaker of the House in a building collapse in Germany.
- When invalid Vice President Noah Calvin (Lew Ayres) declines the office for health reasons, Fenton is replaced by the President Pro Tem of the US Senate, Senator Douglass Dilman of New Hampshire.

=== President Charlotte Field ===
- President in: Long Shot
- First female President, elected to office in 2020.
- Born and raised in Washington, D.C.
- Previously serves as United States Secretary of State under President Chambers, being the youngest person appointed to the office.
- Married to First Gentleman Fred Field (né Flarsky), a speechwriter and former journalist she began seeing romantically during her tenure with the State Department.
- Champions the Global Rehabilitation Initiative, a radical environmentalist policy to which she was able to convince many countries to join as signatories.
- Played by: Charlize Theron
- Political party: Democratic

=== President Robert Fielding ===
- President in: Command & Conquer
- During his time in office, he spearheads the Global Defense Initiative and the White House comes under attack from the Brotherhood of Nod.

=== President John Fields ===
- President in: Executive Power
- Played by: William Atherton

=== President Mallard Fillmore ===
- President in: Captain Carrot and his Amazing Zoo Crew.
- Fillmore's name is a play on Millard Fillmore.

=== President Finesterre ===
- President in: Thank You for Smoking by Christopher Buckley
- Assassinated around the time of the Kennedy assassination
- Uncle of Senator Finesterre, who is engaged in a sex scandal
- Grandfather of Vermont Senator Ortolan K. Finesterre, who is Senator Finesterre's nephew and the former Governor of Vermont

=== President Fisher ===
- President in: Red Dead Redemption 2.
- Fisher serves as president some time before the setting of the game.
- Only appears on the Prominent Americans Cigarette Card Set

=== President Gerald Fitzhugh ===
- President in: Left Behind, End of State by Neesa Hart, and Left Behind: World at War
- Played by: Louis Gossett Jr.
- Fitzhugh becomes a figurehead and lame duck after his powers are removed by Global Community Grand Potentate and Antichrist Nicolae Carpathia. He then secretly controls anti-Carpathia militia and revolts against the world ruler, initiating World War III. He is ultimately killed in retaliatory strikes by the G.C.

=== President John V. Fitz-Kenneth ===
- President in: "The Singular Events Which Occurred In The Hovel On The Alley Off Of Eye Street" by Avram Davidson
- Monarchial President of an alternate history United States in which magic works and is controlled by CEOs of multinational corporations.

=== President Maddie Fitzpatrick ===
- President in: The Suite Life of Zack & Cody
- Fitzpatrick is president for an episode; her campaign is funded by Hot Peppers Delio.
- One of her campaign managers was Zack Martin, who becomes jealous when she kisses someone other than him.
- Played by: Ashley Tisdale

=== President Julia Bliss Flaherty ===
- President in: Seveneves
- Flaherty is the last U.S. president before the destruction of Earth.
- She grabs attention in numerous talk shows and is considered by both Republicans and Democrats as a potential vice president due to her moderate, bi-partisan political views.
- Ascends to presidency after the previous president resigns ten months after election because of a scandal.
- Flaherty is faced with the task of saving some parts of humanity after the moon explodes into seven pieces and threatens to completely destroy Earth.
- She violates an international accord that demands all world leaders shall stay on earth when the apocalypse comes. Flaherty flees to the International Space Station aboard a Boeing X-37 with her science advisor Pete Starling.
- She's marginalized by the passengers of the ark at first. She attempts to reassert her former power and persuades a large number of cloud ark inhabitants to abandon the ISS.
- Disaster and internal dissent lead to the death of many members of her faction and she is overthrown in her role as leader.
- Flaherty becomes one of the seven last surviving women of humankind, the "seven eves", whose genetically modified descendants repopulate earth 5000 years later.

=== President Fletcher J. Fletcher ===
- President in: A Planet for the President
- Fletcher is president during a period of massive global climate change. During his administration, a category 5 hurricane destroys the entire city of New Orleans, killing thousands. To solve the global environmental crisis, the Fletcher administration unleashes a massive biological pandemic, saving only the United States; in the end, the virus kills all humans on the planet except Fletcher.

=== President Oliver Foley ===
- President in: The Twilight Zone episode "The Wunderkind"
- Years after managing the unsuccessful campaign to re-elect President James Stevens, Raff Hanks decides to redeem himself by managing the presidential campaign of Oliver Foley, an eleven-year-old YouTuber whose main policy is providing Americans with free video games.
- Despite being unable to address current issues and being humiliated during a debate, Foley wins the presidency after Raff garners sympathy votes by focusing the campaign on Foley's dying dog.
- As President, Foley attempts to implement his flagship policy of free video games, against the counsel of his advisors, and orders the dissolution of Congress to get out of a mandatory medical examination due to his fear of needles.
- After Hanks attempts to rein-in Foley's behavior, Foley orders the Secret Service to shoot him and introduces a law to prohibiting old doctors, resulting in an apathetic child operating on a wounded Hanks.
- Played by: Jacob Tremblay

=== President Harrison Ford ===
- President in: Scary Movie 3
- Appears as only a portrait of actor Harrison Ford as a former US President in the White House; the current president says, "I wonder what President Ford would have done?"

=== President Ford ===
- President in: Frisky Dingo
- Ford usurps the presidency from President Taqu'il by poisoning the Speaker of the House and the President Pro Tem of the Senate, and shooting down Air Force One with a rocket launcher, while the President, Vice Cabinet, and the Cabinet are on board, making him president via succession as Secretary of Homeland Security.

=== President Robert Fogerty ===
- President in: National Lampoon Goes to the Movies
- Played by Fred Willard

=== President Herbert Forrest ===
- President in: Superman Annual #3 (vol. 2) [DC Comics 1991]
- A former senator who uses the nuclear destruction of Metropolis as an issue to win the presidency
- Forrest asks Batman to stop Superman after he causes the death of U.S. sailors while disarming a nuclear missile submarine.
- Party: Republican

=== President Emily Forrester ===
- President in: Killing Time: A Novel of the Future (2000 novel by Caleb Carr)

=== President James Foster ===
- President in: Chasing Liberty
- Foster is married to Michelle Foster and has one daughter, Anna.
- Popular second-term president with a 63% approval rating
- Played by: Mark Harmon

=== President William Foster ===
- President in: The Enemy Within (TV movie)
- Played by: Sam Waterston

=== President Jonathan Robert "Bob" Fowler ===
- President in: The Sum of All Fears
- Former governor of Ohio. During his presidency, the city of Denver (Baltimore in the film version) is destroyed by a nuclear device.
- Party: Democratic (unnamed in novel, but most likely Democrat)
- In the novel, Fowler orders a nuclear strike on Iran during the crisis, but is countermanded by CIA Deputy Director Jack Ryan and later resigns. In the sequel, Debt of Honor, he is replaced by his vice president, Roger Durling.
- Played by: James Cromwell

=== President Clementine Searcy Fox ===
- President in: First Hubby, a novel by Roy Blount, Jr.
- First female president

=== President-Elect MacArthur Foyle ===
- President-elect in: The People's Choice by Jeff Greenfield.
- Dies from a blood clot after breaking his leg in a horse riding accident before taking office.
- Party: Republican

=== President Frankenstein ===
- President in: Death Race 2000
- Former contestant in a road race that scored points on running over people
- Only three-time winner of the Continental Road Race, and only survivor of the 20th Anniversary Continental Road Race run in 2000.
- Becomes president when he runs over the dictatorial Mr. President, who had been in office since the World Crash of 1979.
- Played by David Carradine

=== President Benjamin Franklin ===
- President in: Childrens Hospital
- Mentioned in a Newsreaders segment on Children's Hospital to have been shot in the head after leaving office

=== President Harriet Franklin ===
- President in: Airline Disaster
- Franklin has to decide between family and the safety of the people in the cities below when she learns the plane her brother is piloting has been skyjacked.

=== President Hunter Franklin ===
- President in: The Oval
- 46th President of the United States since January 20, 2025
- Previously was the 47th Governor of Pennsylvania from January 20, 2015 to January 17, 2023, and the mayor of Pittsburgh, Pennsylvania.
- Graduated from Virginia Tech
- Married to Victoria Franklin and is the father of two children: Gayle and Jason.
- Played by Ed Quinn

=== President Hugh Frankling ===
- President in: The Whole Truth by John Ehrlichman
- Refuses to resign after a scandal

=== President D. Nolan Fraser ===
- President in: The Venus Belt by L. Neil Smith
- As the mayor of Denver, his platform is to restore the personal liberties seen in The Probability Broach.
- Party: Propertarian

=== President Edgar Frazier ===
- President in: Seven Days in May by Fletcher Knebel and Charles W. Bailey, Jr. (1962 novel)
- Serves after President Kennedy, and is elected in 1968
- During his term the Soviet Union invades Iran, which leads to the Iranian War between the US and the Soviets, and the division of Iran between a Communist North and a Free South.
- Loses the 1972 election to Ohio Governor Jordan Lyman largely because of the outcome of the Iranian War.
- Party: Republican

=== President Ferris F. Fremont ===
- President in: Radio Free Albemuth
- Fremont is a paranoid man who turns the U.S. into a Stalinesque police state to crush a nonexistent conspiracy.

=== President Mr. Frog ===
- President in: Smiling Friends
- Voiced by: Michael Cusack
- Is a psychopathic anthropomorphic frog who eats people whole.
- Originally a famous TV personality and billionaire who starred in and eventually self-produced his own sitcom, The Mr. Frog Show, before running for president in the episode "Mr. President".
- Won election against the incumbent President Jimble by one vote from Pennsylvania.

=== President Max Frost (Max Jacob Flatow Jr) ===
- President in: Wild in the Streets
- Played by: Christopher Jones
- Popular rock star who gets minimum age for President reduced to 20 and voting age to 14 by spiking Congress's water with LSD.
- Wins presidency and interns all "oldsters" in concentration camps

=== President Truman Theodore Fruitty ===
- President in: Mr. Show with Bob and David
- Played by: Jay Johnston
- The eleventy-twelfth President
- Causes a major scandal by farting

=== President Annemarie Fucillo ===
- President in Net Force: Dark Web by Jerome Preisler, based on an idea of Tom Clancy and Steve Pieczenik
- First female US President
- amidst an increasing threat by cyber warfare to the national security, Fucillo forms the Net Force, a new elite security agency to combat terror attacks from the dark web

=== President Fuller ===
- President in: Schrödinger's Cat trilogy
- One of many presidents in the series
- Resigns from office after he finds the irrelevancy of his position

=== President FXJKHR ===
- President in: Futurama
- He is the 60th President (of either Earth or the United States)
- He is an alien.
- Details of his presidency are unknown, though a monument resembling the Lincoln Memorial depicts him sitting atop a throne of skulls and eating a human.
