= John Dalmas =

American science fiction writer

- Born: John Robert Jones; December 3, 1926
- Died: June 15, 2017 (aged 90)
- Occupation: Writer
- Writing career
- Pen name: John Dalmas
- Genre: Science fiction
- Website: www.johndalmas.com

John Robert Jones (December 3, 1926 – June 15, 2017) wrote science fiction as John Dalmas. He wrote many books based on military and governmental themes throughout his career. His first published novel was The Yngling, serialized beginning in the October–November 1969 issue of Analog.

== Bibliography ==
=== Collection of short stories ===
- Otherwhens, Otherwheres: Favorite Tales (2002)

=== Fanglith ===
- Fanglith, Baen Books, 1985, 1987
- Return to Fanglith, Baen Books, 1987

=== Lion of Farside ===
- The Lion of Farside, Baen Books, 1995: a simple American farmer marries a beautiful redhead with green eyes. When she is kidnapped by her family and taken back to the magical world she was born in, he buys a revolver and rifle and follows to rescue her. Complications occur. His guns do not work, magic abounds, and he is captured by slavers the moment he crosses into the new world.
- The Bavarian Gate, Baen Books, 1997
- The Lion Returns, Baen Books, 1999

=== Lizard War ===
- The Lizard War, Baen Books, 1989
- The Helverti Invasion, Baen Books, 2004

=== Non-series novels ===
- The Varkaus Conspiracy, Tor Books 1983, 1987
- Touch the Stars: Emergence (with Carl Martin), Tor Books 1983
- The Scroll of Man, Tor Books 1985
- The Reality Matrix, Baen Books, 1986
- The Walkaway Clause, Tor Books 1986
- The Playmasters (with Rod Martin), Baen Books, 1987
- The General's President, Baen Books, 1988
- The Lantern of God, Baen Books, 1989
- Soldiers, Baen Books, 2001
- The Puppet Master, Baen Books, 2001
- The Second Coming, Baen Books, April 2004

=== Regiment ===
- The Regiment, Baen Books, 1987, 1990, 1992, 1995
- The White Regiment, Baen Books, 1990, 1993
- The Kalif's War, Baen Books 1991
- The Regiment's War, Baen Books, 1993
- The Three-Cornered War, Baen Books, 1999
- The Regiment: A Trilogy (omnibus of The Regiment, The White Regiment and The Regiment's War), Baen Books, 2004

=== Yngling ===
- The Yngling, serialized in Analog, Oct and Nov 1969; later (expanded) by Pyramid Books 1971; Jove Books 1977; (revised) Tor Books 1984, 1987; Baen Books 1992 as part of The Orc Wars (see below)
- Homecoming, Tor Books 1984; Baen Books 1992 as part of The Orc Wars (see below)
- The Orc Wars, Baen Books, 1992; includes The Yngling, an expanded version of Exodus ... Genesis originally published in Analog, Oct 1970, and Homecoming
- The Yngling and the Circle of Power, Baen Books, 1992
- The Yngling in Yamato, Baen Books, 1994
