= The Regiment (novel) =

1987 novel by John Dalmas

First edition

The Regiment is a novel by John Dalmas published by Baen Books in 1987.

== Plot summary ==
The Regiment is a novel about a regiment of mercenaries and the reporter who joins them to be their publicist.

== Reception ==
Lynn Bryant reviewed The Regiment in Space Gamer/Fantasy Gamer No. 79. Bryant commented that "The Regiment is a good read. It is a long book that could have benefited by being a bit shorter, but the prose reads easily and while Dalmas could have packed in more battles, there is plenty of action. if you are looking for a good militarily oriented story that challenges you to think, you'll enjoy this book."
