= Ward Moore =

American writer of fiction

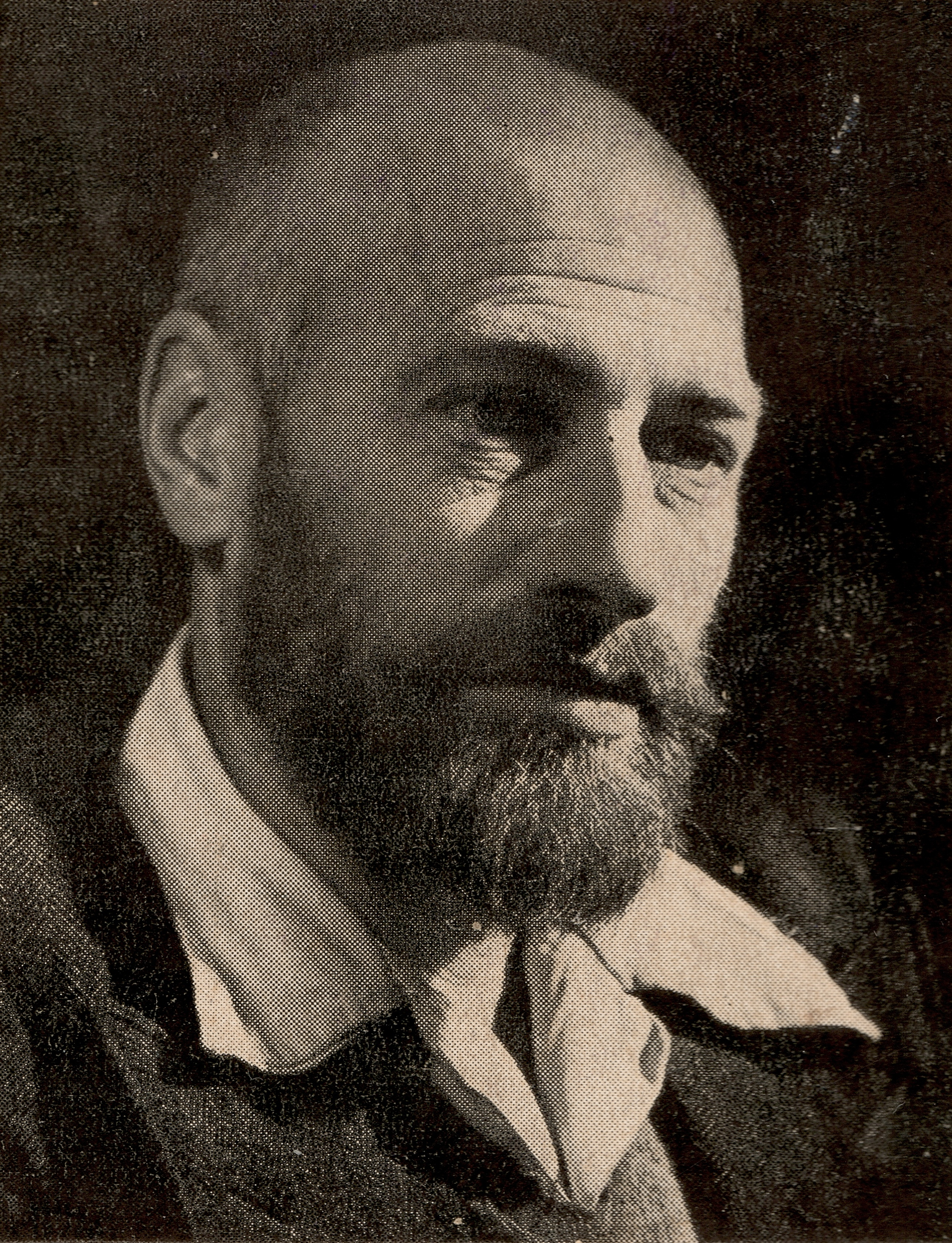
- Portrait from the dust jacket for "Greener Than You Think"
- Born: Joseph Ward Moore; August 10, 1903; Madison, New Jersey, USA
- Died: January 29, 1978 (aged 74); Pacific Grove, California, USA

Joseph Ward Moore (August 10, 1903 – January 29, 1978) was an American science fiction writer. According to The Encyclopedia of Science Fiction, "he contributed only infrequently to the field, [but] each of his books became something of a classic."

== Writer ==
Moore began publishing with the novel Breathe the Air Again (1942), about the onset of the Great Depression. The story is told from multiple viewpoints, and Ward Moore himself appears briefly as a character in the novel.

His most famous work is the alternate history novel Bring the Jubilee (1953). This novel, narrated by Hodge Backmaker, tells of a world in which the South won the American Civil War, leaving the North in ruins.

Moore's other novels include Cloud by Day, in which a brush fire threatens the fictional town of Lugar Pass, which is purported to be in San Diego County near Fallbrook, California; Greener Than You Think, a novel about unstoppable Bermuda grass; Joyleg (co-authored with Avram Davidson), which assumes the survival of the State of Franklin; and Caduceus Wild (co-authored with Robert Bradford), about a medarchy, a nation governed by physicians.

Moore is also known for the two short stories (since collected) "Lot" (1953) and "Lot's Daughter" (1954), which are postapocalyptic tales with parallels to the Bible. His short story "Adjustment", in which an ordinary man adjusts to a never-never land in which his wishes are fulfilled and makes the environment adjust to him as well, has been reprinted several times. Another postapocalyptic story is Moore's 1951 story "Flying Dutchman", which uses the myth of the Flying Dutchman – a legendary ship supposed to be doomed to forever wander the oceans and never reach port – as a metaphor for an automated bomber which continues to fly over an Earth where humanity long since totally destroyed itself and all life in a nuclear war.

== Biography ==
Moore was born in Madison, New Jersey, a western suburb of New York City. His parents were Jewish and had married in 1902, the previous year. His grandfather Joseph Solomon Moore (1821–1892) had been a successful German-born commission merchant and the statistician of the New York custom house, the author of several books on the tariff question and a friend of Carl Schurz. Five months after Ward Moore's birth, he moved with his parents to Montreal, where his mother's family lived. In 1913, they returned to New York.

Moore's parents divorced and remarried around this time, and his father died in 1916. His mother's second husband and Moore's stepfather was the noted German jazz band leader Julian Fuhs. Moore attended De Witt Clinton High School in New York, where—according to one widely repeated story—he was expelled for antiwar activity during World War I; elsewhere, he claimed that he dropped out of school in order to write. He later attended Columbia College.

Moore claimed to have spent several years tramping around the United States as a hobo during the early 1920s. In the mid-1920s, he managed a bookshop in Chicago, where he befriended one of the store's patrons, the young poet Kenneth Rexroth. Moore appears in Rexroth's memoir An Autobiographical Novel as the mad bohemian poet/bookseller/science fiction writer "Bard Major". Rexroth claimed that "Major" had been on the Central Committee of the Communist Party in Milwaukee and was expelled for Trotskyist deviationism, but the factual basis for this tale, if any, is obscure.

In 1929, Moore relocated to California, where he was to live for the rest of his life. Starting in 1937, he participated in the Federal Writers' Project of the WPA, where his friend Rexroth was an administrator in the San Francisco office. His picaresque first novel Breathe the Air Again was about the labor struggle in California during the 1920s. It had autobiographical elements and was widely and favorably reviewed. It was intended to be the first of a trilogy, but the remaining volumes were never published.

In the 1940 census, Moore is listed as living on Clifford Street in Los Angeles with his first wife, Violka. His occupation is listed as writer-novelist in the magazine publishing industry.

During the 1940s, Moore wrote book reviews, articles and short stories for a number of magazines and newspapers, including Harper's Bazaar, the San Francisco Chronicle, Jewish Horizons, and The Nation. On May 3, 1943, in Los Angeles Moore was married to his second wife, Lorna Lenzi. He had seven children. Starting in 1950, he was book review editor of Frontier, a West Coast political monthly similar in outlook to The Nation.

In the early 1950s, he began writing regularly for The Magazine of Fantasy and Science Fiction. He was a friend of the magazine's California-based editors, Anthony Boucher and J. Francis McComas, and soon became a popular favorite with the magazine's readers. Though he was never terribly prolific, his science fiction stories penned during the 1950s were entertaining and well crafted and were well received.

In the 1960s, his literary output diminished, and his last two novels were completed with the help of collaborators. His 1953 speculative "If the South had won the Civil War" novel Bring the Jubilee was brought back into print at the time of the Civil War centennial and found an appreciative new audience among Civil War buffs.

He published little during the 1960s, but published several stories in the mid-1970s.

After separating in June 1963, Moore and Lorna Lenzi were divorced on May 18, 1967. Moore's third wife was the science fiction writer Raylyn Moore (née Crabbe; 1928–2005). The couple moved to Pacific Grove, California, where he died in 1978.

== Partial Bibliography ==
- Breathe the Air Again (1942) non-genre
- Greener Than You Think (1947)
- Bring the Jubilee (1953)
- Lot (1953), short story
- Lot's Daughter (1954), short story
- Adjustment, (1957) short story
- Cloud by Day (1956) non-genre
- Joyleg (1962) (w/Avram Davidson)
- Caduceus Wild (1978) (w/Robert Bradford)
