= A Different Flesh =

1988 short story collection by Harry Turtledove

- Author: Harry Turtledove
- Language: English
- Genre: Alternate history, science fiction
- Published: 1988 (Congdon & Weed)
- Publication place: United States
- Media type: Print (hardcover)
- Pages: 292
- ISBN: 0-86553-198-6
- OCLC: 17263417
- Dewey Decimal: 813/.54 19
- LC Class: PS3570.U76 D5 1988

A Different Flesh is a collection of alternate history short stories by American writer Harry Turtledove. The stories are set in a world in which Homo erectus, along with various megafauna, survived to the modern times in the Americas as the Native Americans along with any other human cultures.

Turtledove was inspired to write the story by a Stephen Jay Gould article that speculated as to how humanity’s distant cousin, Australopithecus, would be treated if that species had survived.

== Plot introduction ==
The stories give a brief glimpse in this altered American history ranging from 1610 to 1988. The Western Hemisphere is inhabited by Homo erectus rather than Homo sapiens, as well as megafauna long extinct in the known world. Consequently, the colonization of the New World by Europe has been a far more difficult process. As time goes by, various characters debate the nature of the "sims" (as erectus is known) and their role in human history.

Included with the short stories are quotations from The Story of the Federated Commonwealths. These snippets from an imaginary textbook providing the reader information about what happens during the time between the different stories.

== Plot summary ==
=== Vilest Beast ===
1610: At the colony of Jamestown, Virginia, Edward Maria Wingfield must rescue his infant daughter from the tribe of wild sims who kidnapped her. The opening passages reveal that Captain John Smith was killed and eaten by sims in 1607.

=== And So To Bed ===
1661: The story is made up of a series of entries in Samuel Pepys' diary. Pepys owns two sims (which can easily be trained in household chores) and contemplates the origin of the species. By watching these sims, as well as observing various other animals found in North America, Pepys develops the theory of evolution.

Only one of the diary's entries in the story has a corresponding entry in the real diary Pepys kept.

=== Around the Salt Lick ===
1691: Thomas Kenton, a scout from Virginia and descendant of Edward Wingfield, and his faithful sim companion Charles, explore the interior of North America. Kenton is after the teeth of the spearfang cats that populate the area. He is captured by a group of wild sims, and must hope that Charles will rescue him. The story structure is reminiscent of James Fenimore Cooper.

=== The Iron Elephant ===
1782: The first steam-driven train is invented by Richard Trevithick in Boston, Plymouth Commonwealth. A race is held in a commonwealth bordering the New Nile starting in Springfield and ending in Cairo, with one of the hairy elephant-pulled trains they threaten to replace.

Notes: 1) The story has some parallels to the legend of John Henry. 2) In this story it is learned that England's American colonies broke off into a new nation - the Federated Commonwealths of America - in 1738, and westward expansion began much sooner than in our history, due to the lack of indigenous humans in the regions to be colonized. Instead, the development of a tyrannical absolutist monarchy during the seventeenth century is cited as the chief reason for colonial secession. 3) The character Trevithick is American rather than British, and appears to be twenty years older than his historic age, so he is probably not the historical figure but an analog. In Turtledove works, it is common for historical figures to have fictitious offspring (as with Edward Wingfield's daughter and her own great-grandson Thomas Kenton above) as a result of the butterfly effect. 4) The FCA's system of currency is mentioned as consisting of units called sesters and denaires (presumably FCA equivalents of US cents and dollars).

=== Though the Heavens Fall ===
1804: A house-slave named Jeremiah goes on trial for running away, and his attorney presents the argument that, with the existence of sims, there is no need for human beings to enslave other human beings. They are successful, and the court's decision leads to the emancipation of all human slaves. There are echoes of the historical Dred Scott Decision.

Note: More about the FCA is learned in this story. The government is based very closely on the Roman Republic. Although the historic USA used that example as a template, the FCA has gone even further, for example by having two chief executives called censors who can veto each other, and a Senate whose members serve for life by virtue of being former censors or commonwealth governors.

=== Trapping Run ===
1812: Henry Quick, a trapper in the Rocky Mountains, is wounded by a bear and is nursed back to health by sims in exchange for making tools such as cups and bows and arrows. While there, he ends up involuntarily impregnating one of the sims, resulting in a Sim-Human hybrid. However, his interference in a challenge to the leadership of the sim tribe, resulting in a fatality, forces Quick to leave. His time among the sims makes him far more sympathetic to them, leading him to establish the sim rights movement.

=== Freedom ===
1988: A group of sim's rights activists, including a great-great-granddaughter of Henry Quick, protesting experimentation on sims, "rescue" Matt, a sim infected with HIV, from a medical lab with the intention of releasing him into a sim preserve. Having failed to take enough HIV inhibitor, which is medicine that suppresses the effects of HIV and AIDS, the activists are eventually forced to return Matt to the researchers.

== Major themes ==
The stories explore what makes someone "human". As time passes humans' view of sims generally shifts from seeing them as beasts into seeing them being close to humans and deserving of some rights. Without anthropomorphizing the sims, Turtledove makes clear that although they cannot become humans and enjoy all the freedoms that humans have, they still deserve to be treated with respect and dignity.

When asked whether the point of divergence of A Different Flesh being set before human history makes the novel a proper alternate history or some sort of "alternative natural history", Turtledove responded: "They seem like alternate history to me, but I haven't really spent a whole lot of time worrying about how to classify them, I'm afraid."

== Literary significance and reception ==
Steven H Silver gave a positive review of the novel and commented that Turtledove left a lot of room open for further stories in the series, but still feels that Turtledove's writing style has changed to the point where future stories would appear out of place. Science fiction author Orson Scott Card also gave a good review for the novel complimenting Turtledove especially on Freedom for the use of a sim's point of view without "sentimentalizing and anthropomorphizing until the true differences between species are erased."

One criticism of the novel was made by a reviewer who thought that there was an assumption that the course of history would have gone pretty much as it did with Native Americans here, and felt that this underestimates the impact of Native Americans on American history.

== Publication history ==
Vilest Beast, And So to Bed, Around the Salt Lick, The Iron Elephant, and Though the Heavens Fall were all originally published in Analog Science Fiction and Fact. Freedom was originally published in Asimov's Science Fiction while Trapping Run was written exclusively for the hardcover edition.

Originally published by Congdon & Weed in 1988, it was first published in paperback by Worldwide the following year. In 1994, Baen reprinted the book.
