= List of fictional United States presidencies of historical figures (S–U) =

Lists of fictional presidents of the United States
A–B	C–D	E–F
G–H	I–J	K–M
N–R	S–T	U–Z
Fictional presidencies of historical figures
A–B	C–D	E–G
H–J	K–L	M–O
P–R	S–U	V–Z

The following is a list of real or historical people who have been portrayed as President of the United States in fiction, although they did not hold the office in real life. This is done either as an alternate history scenario, or occasionally for humorous purposes. Also included are actual US Presidents with a fictional presidency at a different time and/or under different circumstances than the one in actual history.

== S ==
=== Barry Sadler ===
- Barry Sadler is elected president in 1984 in Mitchell J. Freedman's novel A Disturbance of Fate. A Republican, Sadler's pursuit of conservative policies triggers a second civil war that, after much destruction, results in his arrest and the drafting of a new Constitution in which the office of the presidency is abolished.

=== Arnold Schwarzenegger ===
- He is mentioned as a prior commander in chief in Demolition Man with his own presidential library in San Angeles, California.
- "President Schwarzenegger" was also mentioned in the Doctor Who episode "Bad Wolf".
- In the 2007 film The Simpsons Movie, Arnold Schwarzenegger is shown as the president. In the movie, he is a near replica of Rainier Wolfcastle, who is himself a parody of Schwarzenegger. He gives uninformed orders to EPA Administrator Russ Cargill to seal Springfield under a giant glass dome after Lake Springfield becomes horrifically polluted because of Homer Simpson dumping pig feces in it. When Cargill warns of the possibility of a public backlash after learning of Springfield becoming a no man's land (and subsequently manipulates the President into authorizing the destruction of Springfield), Schwarzenegger laments returning to making family comedies, such as "Diaper Genie" in reference to the real Schwarzenegger's failed attempts to leave the action genre. According to The Simpsons creator Matt Groening, Schwarzenegger was the president in the film rather than then-President George W. Bush because, according to Groening, "in two years ... the film [would be] out of date". He was voiced by Harry Shearer in the film.

=== William Scranton ===
- In the 1980 novel Timescape by Gregory Benford, the assassination of John F. Kennedy on November 22, 1963, was averted by a high school student who interrupted Lee Harvey Oswald at the Texas School Book Depository, attacking the shooter and sending the would-be fatal third shot awry. Although seriously injured, Kennedy survived. This interference created an alternate timeline in which William Scranton was the US president in 1974, having defeated Robert F. Kennedy due to a telephone tapping scandal.

=== William H. Seward ===
- In the short story "The Lincoln Train" by Maureen F. McHugh contained in the anthology Alternate Tyrants edited by Mike Resnick, Secretary of State William Seward became the 17th President in 1865. His predecessor Abraham Lincoln was the victim of an assassination attempt in Ford's Theatre on April 14, 1865. He survived but John Wilkes Booth's bullet remained lodged in his brain and he was rendered a vegetable. President Seward organised population transfers of Southern civilians who had owned slaves to the Western territories on a neo-Trail of Tears, where they are left to die of starvation and disease.

=== Horatio Seymour ===
- Note: In actual history, Seymour was a major Democratic Party politician during and after the American Civil War, and a Presidential candidate in 1868. It is reasonable to assume that, had the South won the Civil War – which would have severely discredited the Republican Party – Seymour might have been elected President of the Rump US. However, his fictional presidencies widely diverge from each other.
- In Ward Moore's "Bring the Jubilee", during Horatio Seymour's term the United States suffered the severe economic results of its defeat in the War of Southron Independence and the reparations it had to pay to the victorious Confederacy. Inflation, which already entered galloping state under Seymour's predecessor Clement Vallandigham, became dizzying under President Seymour and precipitated the food riots of 1873 and 1874. The economy was later stabilized, but the rump United States was permanently crippled and went into the 20th Century as a poor backwards country. (Note: The book does not make clear if Seymour had two terms, 1868 and 1872, after a single one by Vallandigham, or only a single one in 1872 after two of Vallandigham.)
- In the alternate history novel The Guns of the South by Harry Turtledove, Horatio Seymour secured the Democratic presidential nomination in the immediate aftermath of the Second American Revolution (1861–1864), running on a ticket with Clement Vallandigham as his running mate. He narrowly defeated President Abraham Lincoln in the 1864 election. The election was a close one and it was over a week before Seymour's victory was determined. During the election, he won 41.5% of the popular votes with 1,671,580 voted and carried 10 states (New York, Pennsylvania, Ohio, Indiana, Kentucky, Missouri, Wisconsin, Maryland, Oregon, and California) and received 138 electoral votes. He was inaugurated as the 17th President on March 4, 1865. Under President Seymour, the United States shifted its focus from its southern border to its northern one. In 1866, the British Empire increased the size of its garrison in the Dominion of Canada, prompting the President to pull troops out of the New Mexico Territory and the Arizona Territory. The United States, still heavily militarized from fighting the Second American Revolution, was able to successfully invade and hold Canada in short order, leading to a war with the United Kingdom. General George B. McClellan had been one of the most prominent advocates of the annexation of Canada.
- In The Confederate States of America: What Might Have Been by Roger L. Ransom, Horatio Seymour won the presidential election of 1864 and became the 17th President. He recognized the Confederacy as an independent nation after the South's victory in the American Civil War.

=== James S. Sherman ===
- In S.M. Stirling's series Tales From the Black Chamber, William Howard Taft died shortly before the 1912 Republican National Convention. Although Taft's Vice President James S. Sherman succeeded him to become the 28th President, Theodore Roosevelt went on to win the Republican nomination and a third term in the presidential election. Roosevelt and his inner circle speculated that Sherman's poor health would preclude him from succeeding Taft as the Republican nominee. As Sherman died on October 30, 1912 in real-life, it is not mentioned whether he lived longer and served the remainder of Taft's term or died in office before its end and was succeeded in turn by House Speaker Champ Clark to serve until January 1913.

=== William Tecumseh Sherman ===
- In the alternate history novel By Force of Arms by Billy Bennett, William Tecumseh Sherman became president. In this timeline, Stonewall Jackson survived the Battle of Chancellorsville and the Confederate States of America won the Battle of Gettysburg and the American Civil War, but six years later Sherman was elected president and the war broke out again.

=== O. J. Simpson ===
- In the final episode of the original run of the satirical UK TV series Spitting Image, O. J. Simpson is depicted as a future U.S. president who is tricked into starting a nuclear war by Noel Edmonds and Mr. Blobby, as part of a series of sketches called 'The Last Prophecies of Spitting Image'.

=== Upton Sinclair ===
- In the alternate history novels American Empire: Blood and Iron and American Empire: The Center Cannot Hold as part of the Southern Victory Series by Harry Turtledove, Upton Sinclair served as the 29th President of the United States from March 4, 1921, to March 4, 1929, and was the first member of the Socialist Party to hold that office. Furthermore, he was the first North American president born after the War of Secession (1861–1862). At the age of 42, he was the youngest man elected to the presidency, a record later tied by Democrat Thomas E. Dewey in 1944. In the years immediately following the Great War (1914–1917), the political tides of the United States were shifting. With the country finally triumphant over its rival the Confederate States of America, the American people began to pull away from the Remembrance spirit and bellicosity of the Democrats and turn to the Socialists. In 1918, the Socialists became the majority party in the House of Representatives for the first time in its history. In 1920, when incumbent President Theodore Roosevelt sought an unprecedented third term, the Socialist Party realized that its time had come. At the 1920 Socialist Convention in Toledo, Ohio, conflict over the presidential nomination arose. Five ballots failed to yield a candidate. The issue was resolved amicably, as Indiana turned its vote away from Senator Eugene V. Debs (a native of Indiana who had previously lost the presidential elections of 1908, 1912 and 1916) and to the much younger Sinclair, who gladly accepted the nomination. Within minutes, Sinclair chose Congressman Hosea Blackford of Dakota as his running mate. Sinclair's acceptance speech at the convention set the tone for the 1920 election. He advocated for equality and justice at the social and economic level, at home and abroad. It was a message that appealed to the voters in those post-war years, and although many Democrats, including Roosevelt and his supporters, warned of dangers the US still faced, Sinclair defeated Roosevelt, ending 36 consecutive years of Democratic control of the White House. He was the first non-Democrat to be elected president since James G. Blaine, the only Republican other than Abraham Lincoln to hold the office, in 1880. President Sinclair was true to his campaign promises. He built up social welfare programs while slashing the military budget, including curtailing the Barrel Works in Kansas. He attempted in his first term to pass an old-age insurance policy to guarantee income for retired persons, but the measure was defeated by a Democratic filibuster in the Senate and never passed. Sinclair took a lighter stance toward the CS than Roosevelt had. He eased the reparations the US had imposed on their neighbor, and ceased them altogether when Confederate States President Wade Hampton V was assassinated in June 1922. President Sinclair was also lenient about the weapons checks in the Confederacy. However, Sinclair was pragmatic. Although he forced the 83-year-old General George Armstrong Custer, one of the few heroes of the Second Mexican War (1881–1882), to retire as the military governor of Canada in 1922, he kept the US military presence strong enough to stop the uprising in 1924. He also kept the rebellious state of Utah well in-hand, although he laid what he believed to be the foundation work to bring it back into the union. During Sinclair's presidency, the United States prospered, although the military leaders grumbled at his naivety. Just prior to Sinclair's re-election in 1924, Roosevelt died of a cerebral hemorrhage. President Sinclair honored Roosevelt's request that the latter be buried at Robert E. Lee's former estate of Arlington County, West Virginia. In 1924, Sinclair easily defeated his opponents. Through his second term, he continued laws friendly to labor unions and other such modest changes but many of his more extreme proposals, such as pensions, were still stalled, possibly due to a conservative Supreme Court and Democratic opposition within a hung Senate. Nonetheless, his second term was successful enough to pave the way for Vice President Hosea Blackford to succeed him in 1928. Sinclair was among the pallbearers at Blackford's state funeral in 1937. President Sinclair's legacy proved difficult to determine. On the one hand, Sinclair was able to ride a strong economic wave, as the United States saw unprecedented growth during his eight years. His administration also loosened some of the more authoritarian tendencies of the Remembrance philosophy and created an atmosphere where the citizens of the US could enjoy greater freedom and equality. On the other hand, he was not able to prepare the country adequately for the stock market crash in 1929 and the resulting depression, which laid the foundation for the rise of Jake Featherston and the Freedom Party in the Confederate States and left the United States vulnerable in the conflict that became the Second Great War (1941–1944).

=== Al Smith ===
- In Ward Moore's 1953 alternate history novel Bring the Jubilee, Al Smith was the Populist Party candidate in 1924 but was defeated by the incumbent Whig President William Hale Thompson. He was later elected in 1928.
- In Harry Turtledove's alternate history novel American Empire: The Victorious Opposition as part of the Southern Victory Series, Al Smith was elected as the 32nd President in 1936 after defeating Democratic incumbent Herbert Hoover and his running mate William Edgar Borah. After Upton Sinclair and Hosea Blackford, he was the third member of the Socialist Party to hold that office. President Smith's first act was to normalize the situation in Utah, putting an end to military rule and returning control to civilians. He then removed the military garrison in Houston and disbanded the Kentucky State Police. However, he did nothing overt to deal with the country's economy, although he did permit the country's continued rebuilding of its military, albeit at a relatively slow pace. Throughout Smith's first term, his counterpart in the Confederate States of America, President Jake Featherston, had demanded the return of territories the CS had lost to the US during the Great War, implying that the C.S. was prepared to retake those territories by force. Smith, wanting to avoid another war, while realising that the American people were tired of the troublesome former Confederate states, finally agreed to meet with Featherston in Richmond, Virginia, the Confederate capital. The result was the Richmond Agreement. Featherston obtained a promise from Smith for plebiscites the three former states in Houston, Kentucky and Sequoyah, provided Smith won the 1940 election. In turn, Smith extracted from Featherston a promise that the plebiscites would be held in a fair atmosphere, that blacks would be allowed to vote for self-determination, that Featherston would not to ask for any more territory, and that any state that changed hands would be demilitarized for 25 years. While Featherston paid the Richmond Agreement lip service, in truth he had intended to break its terms immediately. Based on his success in concluding the Richmond Agreement, Smith was re-elected in 1940. The terms of the agreement, including plebiscites, were carried out early in January 1941. Instead of allowing 25 years to pass before sending Confederate troops and barrels into Kentucky and Houston (now once again western Texas), Featherston broke his promise in 25 days. Freedom Party Stalwarts blew up a police station and blamed it on pro-USA terrorists, inventing an incident for Featherston to use as an excuse to place the Confederate States Army on the banks of the Ohio River. He also demanded the remaining territory that the United States possessed. With the Richmond Agreement shredded, Smith refused to negotiate with his Confederate counterpart and mobilised the United States Army. Featherston continued to issue ultimatums until June 1941. When Smith refused to cave in to Featherston, the Confederate States President initiated Operation Blackbeard, the CSA's war plan for a quick overwhelming victory. By throwing all the offensive units into one army, the Confederacy pushed through Ohio cutting the US in half. Confederate forces reached Sandusky, a town on the shore Lake Erie, in the first week of August 1941. After the USA was cut in two, Featherston demanded the USA surrender, offering terms such as a CS occupation of the US frontier and a reduced US military. President Smith angrily refused, much to Featherston's surprise, and ordered US counterattacks against the Confederate salient while preparing for an offensive in Virginia that autumn. While the Virginia attack was not wholly successful, the continued fighting in the salient robbed Featherston of the short war he needed in the face of superior US resources. While Smith had appeared naive in dealing with Featherston, he nonetheless ordered his War Department to begin building a uranium bomb early in 1941. The project was managed by Assistant Secretary of War Franklin D. Roosevelt. The war took its toll on Smith. While he was able to keep the country unified and fighting, many questioned his policy in dealing with the Confederacy prior to the war. Smith was killed in the Powel House, the presidential residence, in 1942, during a Confederate bombing raid which damaged the building. In response, United States bombers targeted the Gray House, the Confederate States presidential residence. Smith was succeeded by his vice president, Charles W. La Follette (the fictional son of Robert M. La Follette), who eventually led the United States to victory over the Confederate States and its allies on July 14, 1944. In spite of this, La Follette lost the 1944 election to the Democratic candidate Thomas E. Dewey, who became the 34th President. Smith's legacy is viewed in mixed terms. Some have argued that his decision to deal with Featherston diplomatically rather than militarily from the outset very nearly proved to be the country's undoing. Others have argued that in the situation Smith inherited (a weak economy, a weak military, restive populations who didn't want to be citizens), Smith probably made the best choices available to him.

=== Lysander Spooner ===
- In the alternate history novel The Probability Broach as part of the North American Confederacy Series by L. Neil Smith in which the United States became a libertarian state after a successful Whiskey Rebellion and George Washington being overthrown and executed by firing squad for treason in 1794, Lysander Spooner served as the 14th President of the North American Confederacy from 1860 to 1880. After Albert Gallatin, he and Benjamin Tucker were the joint second longest serving president in NAC history with both of them serving for 20 years. In addition to this, by 1986, a half-metric ounce .999 fine silver coin was minted in his likeness.

=== Bruce Springsteen ===
- Bruce Springsteen appears in Jim Mortimore's Doctor Who novel Eternity Weeps. President Springsteen orders a nuclear attack on Turkey and the Moon in an attempt to stop the spread of an alien terraforming virus known as "Agent Yellow".

=== Joseph Stalin ===
- In the alternate history short story "Joe Steele" by Harry Turtledove, the Georgian peasants Besarion Jughashvili and Ekaterine Geladze, the parents of Joseph Stalin, immigrated to the United States in June 1878 where their son was born Iosef Dzhugashvili, "a name even God couldn't pronounce," six months later. He later changed his name to the more American sounding Joseph Vissarion "Joe" Steele. He was elected to an unprecedented six terms. He led his country through two wars but his quest for personal power all but eradicated democracy in the United States. He grew up in California, and became a Democratic Congressman from Fresno. He and the Governor of New York Franklin D. Roosevelt became the front runners for the party's presidential nomination in 1932. Two days into the Democratic National Convention, neither had the necessary two-thirds majority to secure the nomination. Steele, using his loyal supporters Stas Mikoian, Kagan and the Hammer, saw to it that Roosevelt died in a fire at the Governor's Mansion in Albany, New York. With his primary opponent gone, Steele became the party's presidential nominee. His vice-presidential nominee was John Nance Garner. Steele handily defeated his opponent, the Republican incumbent Herbert Hoover with the promise of a Four-Year plan for revitalizing the country's depressed economy. Steele immediately put his plan into action, passing legislation for highways, dams, and other public works projects. The Supreme Court of the United States began overturning this legislation as unconstitutional in 1933. Steele publicly denounced the Court's actions. At the same time, he ordered J. Edgar Hoover, the director of the Bureau of Investigation, to investigate the justices. Hoover discovered "evidence" that four of the justices – namely, Pierce Butler, James Clark McReynolds, George Sutherland and Willis Van Devanter – were in the employ of Nazi Germany. This Gang of Four was arrested and interrogated. Also arrested were Father Charles Coughlin and the Governor of Louisiana Huey Long. Father Coughlin and the justices were executed. Long was killed while trying to "escape" in 1935. For the remainder of his first term, Steele's legislation went unopposed. Steele was re-elected in 1936, defeating his Republican opponent Alf Landon in a landslide, who only wins eight electoral votes from Maine and Vermont. Shortly after taking the oath of office, he was nearly assassinated by a German named Otto Spitzer. Steele was unharmed, but Spitzer was killed in the attack. Steele publicly denounced Adolf Hitler as the mastermind behind the attack. In his second term, Steele began his Second Four-Year Plan. This included more public works and communal farms. Dissenters (better known as wreckers) are sent to isolated areas of the country such as Wyoming, Colorado, Montana, New Mexico, North Dakota, and the Alaska. Steele also ordered Hoover and the Hammer to purge the military. When World War II began in Europe in September 1939, Steele was content to remain neutral. He hated both Hitler and Soviet premier Leon Trotsky equally. However, when Hitler was able gain the upper-hand on the continent, Steele began to support Britain with loans and weapons. He was re-elected to an unprecedented third term in 1940, defeating Wendell Willkie, on the promise that the United States would not enter the war. This proved to be the last free and democratic election in the United States. When Hitler declared war on the Soviet Union in June 1941, Steele tarried for six weeks before providing the Soviet Union with aid. In December 1941, however, the United States entered the war when the Empire of Japan attacked the American naval base at Pearl Harbor. Several weeks later, the Philippines had also fallen to the Japanese. Steele ordered the trial and execution of Admiral Husband E. Kimmel and General Walter Short, the military leaders in charge of Pearl Harbor, and General Douglas MacArthur, who had fled the Philippines. Despite the fact that Japan had attacked the United States, Steele concentrated on Europe. When the Soviet Army defeated the German army at the Battle of Trotskygrad in 1943, Steele began to more earnestly prepare to open a western front. The invasion of Normandy took place in June 1944, five months before Steele was re-elected to a fourth term, unopposed. Germany surrendered in May 1945. Steele turned to Japan, invading the islands in late 1945. After a period of brutal fighting, the Soviet Union invaded the northern islands, taking Hokkaido and the northern part of Honshu. The rest of Japan was occupied by the United States. Emperor Hirohito was killed by an incendiary bomb and the fighting simply stopped. The following year, Steele learned that Germany had been working on an atomic bomb project. He interrogated Albert Einstein about his possible knowledge of the bomb. Einstein admitted that he had almost written to Steele about building a bomb, but had feared that Steele would use it. Steele responded by rounding up and executing several Jewish scientists. However, one, Edward Teller, offered to build the bomb in exchange for his life. Steele agreed. In 1948, North Japan, the puppet state established by the Soviet Union, invaded South Japan, the state created by the United States. South Japan's troops retreated in the face of the North's onslaught until they met United States Marines at Utsunomiya, Tochigi. The Marines held, defeating the North Japanese. With the war on, Steele won a fifth term in 1948. The Japanese War proved to be an ugly war. It ended in August 1949, with an exchange of atomic weapons. The United States destroyed Sapporo, the capital of North Japan, with Teller's completed atomic bomb on August 6. On August 9, the Soviet Union destroyed the major city of Nagona, South Japan. Steele turned his attention back to the US, finding more traitors. He was elected to a sixth term in 1952 but died on March 5, 1953, only six weeks after being inaugurated. Vice President Garner, who was by then 84 years old, ascended to the presidency, briefly serving as the 33rd President, and ordered the executions of the Hammer and J. Edgar Hoover. The Hammer ordered the deaths of Garner and Hoover. Hoover ordered the deaths of Hammer and Garner, and succeeded in his task. Hoover became the 34th President and proved to be even more tyrannical than Steele.
- In Harry Turtledove's alternate history novel Joe Steele, which is an extension of the short-story of the same name, Steele's role is expanded and more info is revealed and changed. For example, he no longer runs unopposed in the 1944, 1948 and 1952 presidential elections. Instead, he defeats Thomas E. Dewey in 1944, Harold Stassen in 1948, and Robert Taft in 1952.

=== Harold Stassen ===
- In the Colonization series as part of the Worldwar series by Harry Turtledove, Harold Stassen was twice elected to the vice presidency in 1960 and 1964, serving under President Earl Warren from 1961 to 1965. He succeeded to the presidency after Warren committed suicide in the wake of the destruction of Indianapolis by the Race in 1965. The then Vice President Stassen was not privy to Warren's decision to attack the Race's Colonization Fleet in 1962. In the aftermath of President Warren's death, Stassen set about removing those members of the Warren administration who had known about his actions. President Stassen was already certain that he would be elected to a term of his own in 1968, a belief which he shared in private with the Soviet premier Vyacheslav Molotov. Stassen soon learned of the new American use of rocket propelled asteroids as a weapon. During a meeting with Sam Yeager, the man who had revealed President Warren's actions to the world, Yeager attempted to broach the subject with President Stassen, who pointedly shared nothing with Yeager.

=== D. C. Stephenson ===
- D. C. Stephenson is the 33rd President in the novel K is for Killing by Daniel Easterman. He is elected as vice president to Charles Lindbergh in the 1932 election, and becomes President in 1940 after planning an assassination of Lindbergh and his wife to prevent him from discovering a secret nuclear weapon collaboration plan with Nazi Germany. Shortly after becoming president, Stephenson is murdered by his own wife, and is succeeded by Speaker of the House Joseph P. Kennedy Sr. Kennedy blames Stephenson's murder on German agents and uses it as a pretext to sever all ties with Germany.

=== Howard Stern ===
- In a parallel universe featured in the Sliders episode "The Young and the Relentless", Howard Stern defeated Jimmy Carter in the 1980 election and became the 40th President at the age of 27.

=== Adlai Stevenson II ===
- In one of the alternate timelines featured in Michael P. Kube-McDowell's novel Alternities, Adlai Stevenson is mentioned as having been elected president in 1956, defeating the incumbent Republican Dwight D. Eisenhower, and serving for two terms, though he is quoted as describing his second term as a curse. His vice president was Estes Kefauver.
- In the alternate history short story "The Impeachment of Adlai Stevenson" by David Gerrold included in the anthology Alternate Presidents edited by Mike Resnick, Adlai Stevenson was elected in 1952 after Dwight D. Eisenhower made the mistake of accepting Joseph McCarthy as his running mate instead of Richard Nixon. He successfully ran for re-election in 1956, once again defeating General Eisenhower. However, he proved to be an extremely unpopular president. As the title of the story implies, Stevenson, the 34th President, was impeached during his second term in August 1958 and resigned, leaving his untested 41-year-old vice-president, John F. Kennedy (who as considered something of a laughing stock having recently married the Hollywood actress Marilyn Monroe, leading satirists to dub the marriage "the new Monroe Doctrine"), as his successor. The most notable events of Stevenson's almost six-year presidency included his commutation of the death sentences of the convicted atomic spies Julius and Ethel Rosenberg in February 1953, his public opposition to the House Un-American Activities Committee, the Soviet Union's growing atomic stockpile, "the Berlin Wall embarrassment," the assassination attempt on Soviet premier Nikita Khrushchev at Disneyland, the Soviet demonstration of a 100-megaton nuclear weapon, the breakdown of France-United States relations due to the President's refusal to back French intervention in Indochina, the public break with J. Edgar Hoover which resulted in the director of the FBI being fired, the extremely unpopular decision to intervene in the Cuban Civil War by sending in troops to support the government of Fulgencio Batista, simultaneous inflation and recession and the launch of the first artificial satellite, Sputnik 1, by the Soviet Union in October 1957. Although the story ends immediately after President Stevenson has decided to resign, it is heavily implied that Nixon, already the front runner for the next Republican nomination, will defeat Kennedy in the 1960 election. This is due to the public's antipathy towards the Democrats and the fact that Kennedy is a much derided figure due to his marriage to Monroe.
- In a parallel universe featured in the Sliders Season Five episode "The Return of Maggie Beckett", the German forces broke through the Allied lines at the Battle of the Bulge in 1944, which caused World War II to drag on until 1947. General Dwight D. Eisenhower was relieved as the Supreme Commander of the Allied Forces in Europe and returned to the United States in disgrace. Consequently, Adlai Stevenson became president. The Stevenson administration made the Roswell UFO incident in July 1947 public knowledge and signed the Reticulan-American Free Trade Agreement (RAFTA), giving the US access to advanced Reticulan technology. This led to a human mission to Mars in the 1990s.
- In the alternate history novel Dominion by C. J. Sansom, World War II ended in June 1940 when the British government, under the leadership of the Prime Minister Lord Halifax, signed the Treaty of Berlin with Nazi Germany. Franklin D. Roosevelt was steadfast in his opposition to the Nazis and the Treaty, which resulted in him losing the 1940 election to his Republican opponent Robert A. Taft, who became the 33rd President. Taft pursued a policy of non-intervention, signing a peace treaty with Japan in 1941 and serving as President for three consecutive terms. Adlai Stevenson was elected in 1952. The Times, which was owned by the pro-Nazi British Prime Minister Lord Beaverbrook, speculated that Stevenson would follow in Roosevelt's footsteps and pursue an interventionist foreign policy in Europe in contrast with Taft during the previous twelve years. It is not mentioned whether Taft sought a fourth term or if another Republican ran as their party's candidate in 1952. Several weeks after his election, President-elect Stevenson gave a speech indicating that he intended to begin trading with the Soviet Union upon taking office on January 20, 1953. Following the death of Adolf Hitler in December 1952, a civil war broke out between the Wehrmacht and the SS over Germany's ongoing war against the Soviet Union with the Stevenson administration providing aid to the Wehrmacht. The new non-communist Russian Federation swiftly advanced into Eastern Europe and revealed the existence of Nazi concentration camps. Elsewhere in Europe, the fascist regimes of Italy, Spain and Germany's satellite states collapsed, and the collaborationist governments of Britain and France were dissolved following negotiations with their countries' respective Resistance movements so that new elections could be held.

=== Henry L. Stimson ===
- In the alternate history short story "Truth, Justice and the American Way" by Lawrence Watt-Evans contained in the anthology Alternate Presidents edited by Mike Resnick, Herbert Hoover defeated Franklin D. Roosevelt in 1932 after Al Smith ran a third-party candidate and split the Democratic vote. Henry Stimson continued to serve as Secretary of State. On Stimson's advice, Hoover went to war with the Empire of Japan in 1934. After defeating Roosevelt in 1936, Stimson became the 32nd President and, under his leadership, the United States emerged victorious from the war. However, President Stimson was criticized for not crushing Japan entirely by invading the Home Islands. Stimson was re-elected in 1940, once again defeating Roosevelt. In 1938, Adolf Hitler was overthrown and killed by a cabal of generals over the invasion of Czechoslovakia. Hermann Göring is mentioned as having succeeded Hitler as Leader of the Nazi Party, continuing to serve in that position until at least 1953. Due to the survival of Nazi Germany, totalitarianism and antisemitism grew stronger across the world well into the 1950s.

=== Harriet Beecher Stowe ===
- In the alternate history novel The Probability Broach as part of the North American Confederacy Series by L. Neil Smith in which the United States became a libertarian state after a successful Whiskey Rebellion and George Washington being overthrown and executed by firing squad for treason in 1794, Harriet Beecher Stowe becomes the 13th President of the old United States from 1859 after Arthur Downing died in office and she was the first woman to hold the office of the presidency. During her presidency, Stowe advocates on banning alcohol, though her plan is never put into action. She served as president until 1860, from when Lysander Spooner was elected.

== T ==
=== Robert A. Taft ===
- In Robert A. Heinlein's The Number of the Beast, he succeeded Franklin D. Roosevelt as the 33rd President Timeline 1 (codename: John Carter)
- In one of the alternate timelines featured in Michael P. Kube-McDowell novel Alternities, Robert Taft was elected as the 34th President in 1952, defeating Adlai Stevenson, after Dwight D. Eisenhower was killed in a plane crash the year before. President Taft pursued a policy of isolationism which subsequently allowed the Soviet Union to emerge as the dominant superpower. He later died in office.
- In the short story "We Could Do Worse" by Gregory Benford, Robert Taft was chosen as the Republican candidate in 1952, winning over General Dwight D. Eisenhower with the support of Richard Nixon, and took Joseph McCarthy as his running mate. He was elected as the 34th President and died in 1953 as he did in real life. McCarthy succeeded him as the 35th President and went on to make himself a brutal dictator. Two federal agents, the principal characters of the story, were grateful that Nixon delivered the California delegation to Taft at the 1952 Convention as it prevented Eisenhower, a "pinko general" with a "Kraut name," from securing the nomination. Furthermore, they regarded Taft's death as a godsend as it allowed McCarthy to accede to the presidency. Taft was the son of William Howard Taft, who had served as the 27th President from 1909 to 1913. After John Adams and John Quincy Adams, the Tafts were the second father-son pair to both serve as president.
- In the alternate history novel Dominion by C. J. Sansom, World War II ended in June 1940 when the British government, under the leadership of the Prime Minister Lord Halifax, signed the Treaty of Berlin with Nazi Germany. Roosevelt was steadfast in his opposition to the Nazis and the Treaty, which resulted in him losing the 1940 election to Robert Taft, who became the 33rd President. President Taft pursued a policy of non-intervention, signing a peace treaty with the Empire of Japan in 1941. Taft won re-election in 1944 and 1948. He was succeeded by Democrat Adlai Stevenson following his victory in the 1952 election, although it is not mentioned if Taft sought a fourth term or if someone else served as the Republican candidate. The Times, which was owned by the pro-Nazi British Prime Minister Lord Beaverbrook, speculated that Stevenson would pursue an interventionist foreign policy in Europe.
- Similar to the above, Robert Taft is also the US president in The Madagaskar Plan by Guy Saville, depicting a timeline in which the United Kingdom and Nazi Germany have negotiated a peace treaty allowing the Reich to conquer much of Africa. Becoming President under these circumstance enable Taft to put to the test his declared strategy – i.e. that a strong military, combined with the natural geographic protection of the Atlantic and Pacific Oceans, would be adequate to protect America even if Germany overran all of Europe.

=== William Howard Taft ===
- In the short story "The Bull Moose at Bay" by Mike Resnick contained in his edited anthology Alternate Presidents, Roosevelt was the subject of an assassination attempt carried out by John Flammang Schrank in Milwaukee, Wisconsin on October 14, 1912, as he was in reality. Whereas he was shot in the chest on that occasion in real life, Schrank's bullet missed him in the story. Running as the Progressive Party candidate, Roosevelt went on to defeat both William Howard Taft, the extremely unpopular incumbent Republican president, and their Democratic opponent Woodrow Wilson in the 1912 election. Shortly after the sinking of the passenger liner RMS Lusitania by the German U-boat U-20 on May 7, 1915, Roosevelt brought the United States into the Great War, resulting in the defeat of the German Empire by the US and its allies within less than a year. This made the United States a world power. In spite of this and the fact that the economy was experiencing a boom, Roosevelt was widely expected to lose the 1916 election to Wilson. At his 58th birthday party on October 27, 1916, Roosevelt attributed his consistently poor performance in the polls to the fact that his erstwhile colleagues in the Republican Party were bitter that he had run as a Progressive Party candidate in 1912 and defeated Taft. He claimed that the Republicans owned three-quarters of the newspapers in the United States whereas the Democrats owned the remaining quarter, meaning that the vast majority of the press coverage was hostile.
- In Harry Turtledove's alternate history novels The Great War: Breakthroughs and American Empire: Blood and Iron as part of the Southern Victory Series, William Howard Taft was a Conservative Democratic congressman representing the state of Ohio in the United States House of Representatives. In the 1910s, he was the Chairman of the House Transportation Committee, the first assignment of freshman Socialist Party Congresswoman and future First Lady Flora Hamburger. Congressman Taft found Hamburger to be quite exasperating, particularly for her opposition to the Great War (1914–1917), and the two quarreled from time to time. He continued to do so after the Socialists won control of Congress and he was stripped of his chairmanship. In 1919, he opposed a resolution which she called for condemning the Freedom Party's persecution of blacks in the Confederate States of America.
- In the alternate history novel And Having Writ... by Donald R. Bensen, Secretary of War William Howard Taft appears very briefly at the beginning of the book. His one and only cameo comes in 1908, when he and President Theodore Roosevelt are discussing the effects that the presence of extraterrestrials could have on the election. He is asked by the Republican National Committee to relinquish their nomination for president, news that overjoys President Roosevelt, who assumes that he will be the new nominee. It is Taft who delivers the startling news that the Committee plans to nominate Thomas Edison, who won the election and served until 1913.
- In the book series Tales from the Black Chamber, William Howard Taft dies shortly before the 1912 Republican National Convention, allowing Theodore Roosevelt to win the nomination.

=== Zachary Taylor ===
- In the short story "How the South Preserved the Union" by Ralph Roberts in the anthology Alternate Presidents edited by Mike Resnick, both Zachary Taylor and his vice president Millard Fillmore were killed in a carriage accident in 1849. President Taylor was succeeded by David Rice Atchison, the President pro tempore of the United States Senate and a prominent pro-slavery activist, who became the 13th President. Shortly after President Atchison's accession, the American Civil War broke out on April 17, 1849, with the secession of Massachusetts from the Union and the Second Battle of Lexington and Concord, from which the rebelling abolitionists, who styled themselves as the New Minutemen, emerged victorious. New Hampshire and Vermont seceded shortly thereafter and were soon followed by the rest of New England, New York, New Jersey and Pennsylvania. The seceding Northeastern states banded together to form the New England Confederacy with Daniel Webster as its first and only President and the revolutionary abolitionist John Brown as the commander of its army. The war came to an end in 1855, two years after President Atchison had issued a proclamation promising that any slave who fought in the United States Army would be granted his freedom following the end of the war and that any factory slave who worked satisfactorily would be granted his or her freedom after the war and would be paid for that work from then onwards.
- In the Southern Victory novel How Few Remain by Harry Turtledove, Zachary Taylor served as the twelfth president of the United States as he did in real life. Despite him being born in Virginia, Taylor was still appreciated in the United States due to his military success, even after the War of Secession. During his youth, Theodore Roosevelt was a great admirer of Taylor's military works, viewing him as a great conqueror and leader ranking with George Washington and Napoleon.

=== Tecumseh ===
- In the Temeraire Series novel Blood of Tyrants by Naomi Novik, Tecumseh is mentioned in passing as being president in 1812.

=== Norman Thomas ===
- Norman Thomas is referred to as a former two-term President for the Populist Party in Ward Moore's 1953 novel Bring the Jubilee.

=== William Hale Thompson ===
- William Hale Thompson, as the Whig party candidate, defeated populist President Thomas R. Marshall in 1920, and won a second term against Al Smith in 1924 in Ward Moore's novel Bring the Jubilee.

=== Samuel J. Tilden ===
- In the short story "Patriot's Dream" by Tappan King in the anthology Alternate Presidents edited by Mike Resnick, Samuel Tilden defeated Rutherford B. Hayes in 1876, becoming the 19th President, after a series of nightmares help convert him from a low-key corporate lawyer to a crusading reformer. He was re-elected in 1880. His vice president was Winfield Scott Hancock, who succeeded him as president with Grover Cleveland being his vice president.
- In "I Shall Have a Flight to Glory" by Michael P. Kube-McDowell, also contained in the anthology Alternate Presidents edited by Mike Resnick, Samuel Tilden, still bruised by his loss to Hayes in 1876, adopted similar tactics against his Republican opponent James A. Garfield to defeat him in the 1880 election. However, Garfield, with the help of Charles J. Guiteau (his assassin in real history), vainly attempt to convince Tilden that they can fix the corrupted electoral system. When he declines the offer, Garfield and Guiteau assassinate him before he could be inaugurated as the 20th President.
- In the first Southern Victory Series novel How Few Remain by Harry Turtledove, Samuel Tilden is referred to as having served one term from 1877 to 1881. Elected in 1876, he became an unpopular president after he removed the twelve stars on the U.S flag that represented the Confederate States. Tiden was defeated in his bid for re-election in 1880 by his Republican challenger James G. Blaine. Confederate States President James Longstreet expressed disappointment at the more hardline Blaine's election as Tilden had given the Confederate States of America a free hand throughout his presidency, as had all of his Democratic predecessors since the War of Secession (1861–1862).

=== John Travolta ===
- In the Second Chance pilot episode, it was mentioned that John Travolta had been president at some point prior to 2011. By that year, his picture was on the fifty-dollar bill.

=== Harry S. Truman ===
- The alternate history short story "The More Things Change..." by Glen E. Cox, contained in the anthology Alternate Presidents edited by Mike Resnick, tells the story of the 1948 election in reverse, with the underdog Thomas E. Dewey eventually defeating Harry Truman, the incumbent and the early overwhelming favorite, by playing to anti-communist fears. Dewey therefore succeeds him as the 34th President. The story contains a reference to the famously inaccurate banner headline "Dewey Defeats Truman". Given that it was obvious to everyone—even before it happened—that Dewey would lose the election, the front-page headline of the Chicago Tribune on November 3, 1948, erroneously reads "Truman Defeats Dewey". The front cover of the anthology depicts a grinning Dewey proudly holding up the relevant edition of the Chicago Tribune in the same manner as Truman did in real life.
- In the final Southern Victory Series alternate history novel Settling Accounts: In at the Death by Harry Turtledove, Harry S. Truman was elected vice president in 1944 on the Democratic ticket with Thomas E. Dewey, defeating the Socialist incumbent Charles W. La Follette and his running mate Jim Curley and Republican candidate Harold Stassen. Truman had served as an artillery officer during the Great War (1914–1917). A thorough hawk on foreign policy, Vice President-elect Truman travelled to the restive state of Florida to encourage US troops to their occupation, supporting President-elect Dewey's goal of reintegrating the former Confederate States into the Union. Given that it was widely believed that Dewey would lose the election given that President La Follette had recently presided over the end of the Second Great War (1941–1944), the front-page headline of the November 8, 1944 edition of the Chicago Tribune inaccurately read "La Follette Defeats Dewey". Truman was photographed holding up a copy of the paper by the media.
- In the alternate history novel The Man with the Iron Heart by Harry Turtledove, Harry Truman became the 33rd President upon the death of his predecessor Franklin D. Roosevelt on April 12, 1945, as he did in reality. Upon his accession to the presidency, Truman faced several difficult decisions. When the European theatre of World War II was winding down, the Empire of Japan had signaled its intention to fight until the bitter end. The war in Europe officially ended on May 8, 1945 with the surrender of Nazi Germany. In actuality, it erupted again almost immediately as the German Freedom Front, under the command of Reinhard Heydrich, launched a resistance against the Allied Forces occupying the country. The casualties inflicted against American troops began to wear away at public support for the occupation. As in real life, Truman chose to deploy the atomic bomb against Japan rather than invading the country and, consequently, the Japanese cities Hiroshima and Nagasaki were bombed on August 6, 1945, and August 9, 1945, respectively. Japan surrendered immediately. However, the situation in Germany was rapidly deteriorating. Nearly 1,000 American soldiers had been killed since the war in Europe had officially ended, including General George S. Patton. Diana McGraw, the mother of one of these soldiers, gathered together other people who had lost loved ones and began to protest the Truman administration's handling of the situation. December 1945 proved to be the most difficult period for Truman. The GFF destroyed the Palace of Justice in Nuremberg immediately before various captured Nazi officials were about to go on trial for war crimes and then issued a film featuring kidnapped Private Matthew Cunningham pleading for the withdrawal of all US troops from Germany in exchange for his life. McGraw's Mothers Against the Madness in Germany protested outside the White House. Her group was joined by various legislators, both Democrat and Republican. The chaos in Germany continued for almost another two years, during which time the numerous black marks on the record of the Truman administration resulted in the Republicans winning control of both the House and the Senate in November 1946. The Truman administration saw no choice but to begin the withdrawal of American soldiers towards the end of 1947. Shortly thereafter, Heydrich was finally located and killed by American troops. Although the administration's critics saw this as even greater reason to pull out troops, Truman worried that Heydrich's death did not mean the death of the GFF. This fear proved to be correct as his second-in-command Joachim Peiper soon picked up where Heydrich left off, launching a series of commercial airline hijackings. While Truman planned on running for election in 1948, it was widely expected that he would lose the election to his Republican opponent. By early 1948, one of the front runners for the Republican nomination was the Governor of New York Thomas E. Dewey, in spite of the fact that he had previously lost the 1944 election to Roosevelt.
- In the Hot War Series by Harry Turtledove, although Harry S Truman successfully helped lead the country to victory in World War II in 1945, his political miscalculations over the Korean War helped spark World War III in 1951.

=== Donald Trump ===
- Donald Trump was mentioned as being president before Lisa Simpson in the year 2030 in The Simpsons episode "Bart to the Future". He was a very bad president and caused the American economy to collapse. United States Secretary of the Treasury Milhouse Van Houten and one of the presidential aides mention that Trump and his administration had decided to invest in the nation's children, which turned out to be a big mistake, as his balanced breakfast program ended up creating a generation of ultra-strong super-criminals and midnight basketball games taught them to function without sleep. This in turn caused a crisis for Lisa when she became president. Ironically, about 15 years after Bart to the Future aired, Donald Trump announced his 2016 campaign run. Media began noting that the Simpsons had "predicted" Trump's run. In an interview with TMZ in May 2016, Matt Groening thought that it was unlikely that Donald Trump will become the president of the United States. After Donald Trump won the 2016 election, the Simpsons used the phrase "Being Right Sucks" in a chalkboard gag for the episode "Havana Wild Weekend"
- In the novel Agency by William Gibson, Hillary Clinton defeats Donald Trump in the 2016 election.
- In the 2018 Doctor Who episode Arachnids in the UK, Donald Trump is mentioned as the incumbent president. A decades-long dislike of him motivates businessman Jack Robertson (himself, a Trump analogue) to run as president in 2020, which is ultimately derailed following revelations of his company's practice of building luxury hotel complexes atop dumping grounds for industrial waste, which in Sheffield resulted in an infestation of giant mutant spiders. In Revolution of the Daleks, Robertson falsely takes credit for saving the world from Daleks, suggesting that he may run again in 2024.
- In the 2019 alternate history short-story Election Day by Harry Turtledove, Donald Trump was the Republican Party's presidential nominee for the 2016 presidential election as he was in real life. He ran on a healthy dose of populism and America Firstism. While his traits appealed to a number of people, he ultimately narrowly lost to Democratic candidate John F. Kennedy Jr. who was never killed in a plane crash in July 1999. The election was close, with Trump winning major swing states such as Florida and Ohio, though he was not able to crack the "Blue Wall" and Kennedy was able to win Michigan, Pennsylvania, and Wisconsin. It took until the early morning hours that the election was finally called. Trump gave his concession speech while surrounded by his family at Trump Tower in New York City. It was not a gracious speech: while Trump conditioned his concession on the presumption that the election was indeed "free and fair", he did gloat that he'd scared the elites and that he'd run again in 2020. To the relief of many, he did not refuse to concede or incite his supporters to violence. He did call Kennedy to congratulate him, but the call was a typically sour affair.
- In the 2019 joint BBC-HBO miniseries Years and Years, written by Russell T. Davies, Donald Trump is shown to have won re-election in 2020, although the Democrats accuse Russia of election interference, there is a voting scandal in Florida and France refuses to accept the validity of the vote. His second term witnesses heightened tensions with China, culminating in his authorisation of a nuclear strike against Hong Sha Dao (a Chinese artificial island housing a military base) days before leaving office, resulting in international sanctions against the US and the United Nations threatening to withdraw their headquarters from New York. He is succeeded as president by Mike Pence, who is widely regarded as being Trump's puppet. By 2027, Trump's likeness is mentioned as becoming the fifth of a US president to be carved into Mount Rushmore.
- In And the Last Trump Shall Sound by Harry Turtledove, James K. Morrow and Cat Rambo, Donald Trump was re-elected as president in 2020 but died during a second coronavirus pandemic in 2024. The presidencies of both him and his successor, Mike Pence, saw the United States transformed into a right-wing, Christian fundamentalist, authoritarian state. By 2031, the policies of the Trump and Pence administrations instigated the last states controlled by Democrats to secede as the nations of Pacifica (comprising California, Oregon and Washington) and Newtopia (comprising New York, New Jersey and New England).
- In the novelisation of the Doctor Who episode Dalek by Robert Shearman, it is implied that Donald Trump is the incumbent president, the 'owner of the Internet' Henry van Statten having had a meeting with him at a Florida golf course. (This retcons the original televisual story, which was set in 2012 with van Statten considering determining the outcome of that year's election due to the incumbent president being behind in the opinion polls, asking his staff if the next President should be a Democrat or a Republican.)
- In the 2022 Mike Bartlett play The 47th, which depicts an imagined future history of the 2024 presidential election, Donald Trump (played by Bertie Carvel) announces his 2024 candidacy during a rally for Ted Cruz, having originally planned not to contest the election and endorse Cruz instead. Prompted by Trump's secret threats of compromising information about Jill Biden and his own uncertainties over his own re-election prospects, Joe Biden resigns as President and is succeeded by Kamala Harris. After the first presidential debate is disrupted by Trump supporters, Trump is briefly arrested and imprisoned to end resulting mob violence but is later released to prevent him becoming a martyr. Trump dies from injuries he sustained from a car crash one week before the election, either as the result of a plan by the Harris administration to end mob rule or out of revenge by Ivanka Trump. He is succeeded as the Republican candidate by Ivanka.
- In season 27 of South Park, Donald Trump is depicted as the incumbent president. South Park resident Herbert Garrison was previously depicted as president from 2017 to 2021 as both a parody of and surrogate for Trump, with the actions of the Trump administration leading South Park residents to mistakenly believe that Garrison is President again and attempt to confront him.
- At the end of the Timeless episode "Ms. Sherlock Holmes", the main characters ask who the incumbent president is to see if their actions have altered the timeline. Agent Christopher tells them that it is Donald Trump, and asks whether that was supposed to happen upon seeing their reaction, to which Lucy responds: "I don't know, but it wasn't us."

Donald Trump is the incumbent president. Elected to a first term in 2016, he lost re-election in 2020 but was subsequently re-elected for a non-consecutive second term in 2024.

=== Benjamin Tucker ===
- In the alternate history novel The Probability Broach as part of the North American Confederacy Series by L. Neil Smith in which the United States became a libertarian state after a successful Whiskey Rebellion and George Washington being overthrown and executed by firing squad for treason in 1794, Benjamin Tucker served as the 17th President of the North American Confederacy from 1892 to 1912. After Albert Gallatin, he and Lysander Spooner were the joint second longest serving president in NAC history with both of them serving for 20 years.

=== Rexford Tugwell ===
- Rexford Tugwell is president in The Grasshopper Lies Heavy by Hawthorne Abendsen, an alternate history novel-within-a-novel which forms a major part of the plot of The Man in the High Castle by Philip K. Dick. This is an example of recursive science fiction. In The Grasshopper Lies Heavy, President-elect Franklin D. Roosevelt was not assassinated by Giuseppe Zangara on February 15, 1933, as he was in the world of The Man in the High Castle, and went on to serve two terms in office. In 1940, Roosevelt declined to run for a third term and his fellow Democrat Tugwell was elected as the 33rd President. President Tugwell removed the U.S. Pacific fleet from Pearl Harbor, Hawaii, saving it from Japanese attack and ensuring that the United States entered World War II as a well-equipped naval power. The United Kingdom retained most of its military-industrial strength, contributing more to the Allied war effort, leading to Field Marshal Erwin Rommel's defeat in North Africa, a British advance through the Caucasus to guide the Soviets to victory in the Battle of Stalingrad, Italy reneging on its membership of and its betrayal of the Axis powers and British Army and the Red Army jointly conquering Berlin. At the end of the war, the Nazi leaders—including Adolf Hitler—were tried for their war crimes. The Führer's last words are Deutsche, hier steh' ich ("Germans, here I stand"), in imitation of the priest Martin Luther. Post-war, Winston Churchill remained Prime Minister and, because of its military-industrial might, the British Empire did not collapse. President Tugwell established strong business relations with Chiang Kai-shek's right-wing regime in China, after vanquishing the Communist Mao Zedong. The British Empire became racist and more expansionist following the end of the war while the United States outlawed Jim Crow, resolving its racism by the 1950s. Both changes provoke racialist-cultural tensions between the US and the UK, leading them to a Cold War for global hegemony between the two vaguely liberal, democratic, capitalist societies. Although the end of the novel was never depicted in the text, one character claimed the book ended with the British Empire eventually defeating the US, becoming the world's only superpower.

=== John Tyler ===
- In the counterfactual history essay "His Accidency" by Tom Wicker contained in the anthology What Ifs? of American History, John Tyler was the running mate of General William Henry Harrison in 1840 in which Harrison defeated the Democratic incumbent Martin Van Buren, as occurred in real life. At his inauguration on March 4, 1841, the 68-year-old Harrison decided to wear a coat and hat and cut his inauguration speech in half given that it was a cold and rain day. Consequently, he did not contract the pneumonia which claimed his life a month later in reality and served out his full term. Tyler never acceded to the presidency. During his term in office, President Harrison was non-committal about offering the Republic of Texas the opportunity to join the Union as a slave state. Due to Harrison's hesitation, Texan President Sam Houston accepted Mexico's offer to recognize the independence of Texas, provided that it did not join the United States. The Mexican–American War (1846–1848) never broke out and California, Arizona and New Mexico all remained part of Mexico. Harrison's care for his personal health turned out to have seriously derailed the Manifest Destiny.
