= List of fictional United States presidencies of historical figures (K–L) =

Lists of fictional presidents of the United States
A–B	C–D	E–F
G–H	I–J	K–M
N–R	S–T	U–Z
Fictional presidencies of historical figures
A–B	C–D	E–G
H–J	K–L	M–O
P–R	S–U	V–Z

The following is a list of real or historical people who have been portrayed as President of the United States in fiction, although they did not hold the office in real life. This is done either as an alternate history scenario, or occasionally for humorous purposes. Also included are actual U.S. presidents with a fictional presidency at a different time and/or under different circumstances than the one in actual history.

== K ==
=== Kim Kardashian ===
- In the episode "Time Travel" of the BBC Radio 4 comedy series Daphne Sounds Expensive, the troupe unsuccessfully attempted several schemes involving time travel to pay off the debt incurred buying their time machine. This indirectly resulted in a reality television star becoming President of the United States: President Kardashian. She is mentioned as announcing a 'Muslin ban' as it was one of her least favorite fabrics.

=== Estes Kefauver ===
Kefauver is president in The New Order: Last Days of Europe. Kefauver is elected as the 35th president of the United States from 1957 to 1961. He took office following the presidency of Dwight D. Eisenhower and was succeeded by Richard Nixon by way of contingent election.

=== Joseph P. Kennedy Sr. ===
- In Fatherland, a novel by Robert Harris (later adapted into a movie by HBO and radio dramatisation for BBC Radio), Nazi Germany won World War II resulting in a far different world by April 1964. Joseph P. Kennedy Sr. had been elected President in 1960, likely because of his support for appeasement during his tenure as US Ambassador to Great Britain, and was seeking re-election in 1964. With tensions easing between the world's two major superpowers, a 75-year-old Adolf Hitler welcomes President Kennedy to a Berlin summit supposedly in the interest of fostering détente. However, the novel's protagonist Xavier March is told by Arthur Nebe that it is hoped that the summit will end American support for the Soviets' guerrilla war against Nazi Germany fought since the late 1940s, the motive for a cover-up of any evidence of the Holocaust including the covert assassination of all surviving attendees of the Wannsee Conference. Kennedy was believed by one of the main characters to be a shoo-in for re-election. President Kennedy was played by Jan Kohout in the movie.
- In the novel K is for Killing by Daniel Easterman, he becomes the 34th president in 1940 following the assassination of President D. C. Stephenson. Stephenson was elected vice president under Charles Lindbergh in 1932, and became president upon arranging for Lindbergh's assassination to prevent him from discovering a secret nuclear weapon collaboration plan with Nazi Germany. In the novel, Joseph P. Kennedy, Sr. is Speaker of the House and becomes President when Stephenson is killed by his own wife, but blames it on German agents and uses it as a pretext to sever all ties with Germany.

=== Joseph P. Kennedy Jr. ===
- In Franz Ferdinand Lives! A World Without World War I (2014) by Richard Ned Lebow in which neither World War I nor World War II took place, Joseph P. Kennedy, Jr was elected president in 1960 and served two terms. His First Lady was the former model, Broadway actress and Winner Take All hostess Athalia Fetter. She became a prominent activist in the civil rights movement, which resulted in a rapid decline in her husband's popularity. Although they were portrayed as a fairy tale couple, they often had extremely heated arguments in the White House. JPK's Attorney General was his younger brother John F. Kennedy. During an argument with the First Lady, JPK once remarked that he wished that he had married Jack's wife Jacqueline Kennedy as he was certain that she would have been a vacuous First Lady who would remain out of politics.

=== John F. Kennedy ===
- In the parallel universe featured in the film Quest for Love, John F. Kennedy likewise served as the US president but he was never assassinated. In 1971, he was elected Secretary-General of the League of Nations, which still existed as World War II never happened in that universe.
- In the 1980 novel Timescape by Gregory Benford, the assassination of John F. Kennedy on November 22, 1963, was averted by a high school student who interrupted Lee Harvey Oswald at the Texas School Book Depository, attacking the shooter and sending the would-be fatal third shot awry. Although seriously injured, Kennedy survived. This interference created an alternate timeline in which William Scranton was the US president in 1974, having defeated Robert F. Kennedy due to a telephone tapping scandal.
- In James P. Hogan's The Proteus Operation, John F. Kennedy is elected president in 1972, in an alternate history where Nazi Germany won World War II and the German-Japanese Axis rules all the world except for North America and Australia. President Kennedy vows "not to give up a single inch of free soil" and engages in an increasingly tense Cold War with the Nazis and Imperial Japanese, facing the bleak possibility of either defeat in the coming hot war or the destruction of the world in a nuclear holocaust. In 1974, Kennedy sponsors a secret time travel project to send a special commando unit back to 1939, whose intervention eventually creates our own history.
- In Brad Ferguson's The World Next Door, John F. Kennedy was still alive and still legally the president in the 1990s as the US and the whole world were completely devastated in 1962 when the Cuban Missile Crisis turned into all-out nuclear war and no further elections were ever held. Kennedy is hated and detested by the remnants of the American population, starting to revive by their own efforts in small pockets here and there. Generally considered "The man who destroyed the country", Kennedy's exact whereabouts are unknown, and he is rumored to be "hiding out in a bunker somewhere."
- Also in Michael Chabon's The Yiddish Policemen's Union, Kennedy married Marilyn Monroe. In this version, he managed to avoid the 1963 assassination. The book makes a reference to the US becoming mired in a prolonged 'Cuban War', which might have started with Kennedy's Bay of Pigs invasion. However, no details are given, as Chabon's book is focused on a fictional Jewish territory in Alaska and other issues are peripheral to its plot.
- In "Winter of Our Discontent: The Impeachment and Trial of John F. Kennedy", by Bryce Zabel (originally written on collaboration with Harry Turtledove, but completed by Zabel alone), President John Kennedy survived an assassination attempt in Dallas and went on to be re-elected in 1964. However, in 1966 two investigative reporters, Chuck Duncan and Alan Lefkowitz, published sensational revelations on misdeeds in the Kennedy Administration. This led to Congress eventually impeaching Kennedy and removing him from office.
- In one of the alternate realities featured in The Coming of the Quantum Cats by Frederik Pohl, John Kennedy was a Senator from Massachusetts in 1986 who was married to a woman named Marilyn. At the time, Nancy Reagan was President of the United States. She was considered a strong and assertive president, who successfully guided her version of the United States through the major crisis of an invasion from a different reality. Her husband Ronald, known as the First Gentleman, was mostly disregarded.
- In the alternate history novel Voyage by Stephen Baxter, John Kennedy was the victim of an assassination attempt in Dallas, Texas on November 22, 1963. While Kennedy survived, his wife Jacqueline Kennedy was killed and he was left crippled and incapacitated. His condition forced him to resign and Lyndon B. Johnson became the 36th President. Richard Nixon was elected in 1968 and, on July 20, 1969, he conducted a widely broadcast phone caljl with the Apollo 11 astronauts Neil Armstrong and Joe Muldoon, the first men to set foot on the Moon. During the phone call, former President Kennedy committed the United States to send a crewed mission to Mars, which Nixon eventually took up and started implementing in practice. The Mars flight was launched from Jacqueline B. Kennedy Space Center, which was named for the late First Lady, in 1980.
- In the alternate history Dark Future wargame series by Kim Newman, John Kennedy was defeated by Richard Nixon in the 1960 election after it was discovered that he was having an affair with Marilyn Monroe.
- In the short story "The Impeachment of Adlai Stevenson" by David Gerrold included in the anthology Alternate Presidents edited by Mike Resnick, the title character defeated Dwight D. Eisenhower in 1952 after Eisenhower made the mistake of choosing Joseph McCarthy as his running mate instead of Richard Nixon. However, Stevenson proved to be an extremely unpopular president, leading to his impeachment and subsequent resignation in August 1958. Stevenson was succeeded by John Kennedy, his untested 41-year-old vice-president who becomes the 35th President. Although the story ends immediately after Stevenson has decided to resign, it is heavily implied that Nixon, already the front runner for the next Republican nomination, will defeat Kennedy in the 1960 election. This is due to the public's antipathy towards the Democrats and the fact that Kennedy is a much derided figure due to his recent marriage to the Hollywood actress Marilyn Monroe, referred to derisively as "the new Monroe Doctrine."
- In the short story "The Kennedy Enterprise" by David Gerrold contained in the anthology Alternate Kennedys edited by Mike Resnick, John Kennedy was raised in Hollywood and eventually decided to become an actor. Although he was cast in numerous films in the 1940s and the 1950s, roles began to dry up by the time that he had reached his mid 40s. However, in 1966, he was cast in what would become his best known role, namely Captain Jack Logan of the U.S.S. Enterprise (NCC-1701) in the hugely popular science fiction television series Star Track.
- In the short story Them Old Hyannis Blues by Judith Tarr also contained in the anthology Alternate Kennedys edited by Mike Resnick, Jack Kennedy and his brothers are a famous rock group while Elvis Presley is President of the United States. Meanwhile Mick Jagger is an underground leader and John Lennon is the United States Secretary of State. The front cover of the anthology depicts a stack of vinyl records with a record showing the Kennedy brothers on top, referencing the story.
- In the alternate history novel The Two Georges by Harry Turtledove and Richard Dreyfuss, John Kennedy was an editor in Boston, Massachusetts in 1995. Although born and raised in the North American Union, Kennedy had a strong sense of his Irish heritage and hated the British Empire for its past and continued transgressions against Ireland from the Great Famine (1845–1852) to the abject poverty and brutal exploitation of the NAU's Irish miners in the present. He adopted a separatist stance, which he expressed through the magazine Common Sense, frequently skirting the edge of legality. He was suspected of being a member of the terrorist organisation, the Sons of Liberty. When the Thomas Gainsborough painting The Two Georges was stolen from the Provincial Governor's mansion in New Liverpool, Upper California in June 1995, Royal American Mounted Police officers Thomas Bushell and Samuel Stanley and the painting's custodian Dr. Kathleen Flannery followed suspected Sons member Joseph Killbride to Boston, they met with Kennedy, who proved combative in dealing with Bushell and made very subtle and inappropriate advances towards Flannery. His brother was a Catholic archbishop.
- In the alternate history novel The Gladiator also by Harry Turtledove, the decision of John Kennedy to back down during the Cuban Missile Crisis in October 1962 was a signal to the world that the United States was not as serious about fighting the Cold War as it held itself out as being. After the US withdraw its troops from the Vietnam War in 1968, communists and socialists formed popular fronts in the face of the United States' perceived weakness. With the Soviet Union's support, these popular fronts were able to successfully topple Western Europe's capitalist and democratic governments and established People's Republics. The United States was the last nation to fall. By the end of the 20th century, the entire world had turned to communism. By the late 21st century, the United States was seen as harmless and was completely obedient to the Soviet Union.
- In the 2006 science fiction short story Before the Beginning by Harry Turtledove, an invention called the time-viewer was created so people to view the past, The assassination of John F. Kennedy became one of the most popular time-viewer recordings. The recording could be purchased along with the assassination of his brother Robert, the plane crashes that killed his brother Joseph and his son John Jr. and the skiing accident that killed his nephew Michael. The time-viewer showed that President Kennedy's assassination was indeed perpetrated by Lee Harvey Oswald. The time-viewer was also used to make pornographic recordings of Kennedy's sexcapades.
- In the first parallel universe featured in Sliders, the United States was a severely impoverished nation whereas Mexico was an industrial giant and a world power. Americans emigrated across the Mexican border in droves. Furthermore, the world was undergoing global cooling. In this universe, the Twenty-second Amendment, which states that no person may be elected to the presidency more than twice, had seemingly never been ratified. Consequently, John Kennedy was elected to the nation's highest office in every election from 1960 to 1992. At the time of Quinn Mallory's visit to this universe in September 1994, Kennedy was serving his ninth term as president. He did not plan to run for re-election in 1996. He was married to the former Hollywood actress Marilyn Monroe.
- In a parallel universe featured in the Sliders Season Two episode "Time Again and World", John Kennedy was assassinated in Dallas, Texas on November 22, 1963 by Julius and Ethel Rosenberg. After the Rosenbergs were executed, the director of the FBI J. Edgar Hoover became the 36th President. As a result of Hoover's rise to power, much of the United States Constitution was abridged and martial law was declared. In the Second Gettysburg Address, President Hoover spoke out against the ills of civilization, claiming that democracy was leading to godless amorality and the breakdown of the family unit. Hoover remained president for 22 years until his death in 1985. Martial law had effectively rendered the United States a police state by 1996.
- In a parallel universe featured in the Sliders Season Two episode "Obsession", a young psychic from San Francisco predicted the assassination of President Abraham Lincoln on April 14, 1865, and thereby prevented his death. Lincoln was so grateful and impressed that he created a cabinet post known as the Prime Oracle, whose job was to predict natural and manmade disasters. He and his successors were so successful that millions of American citizens came to trust and believe in psychic abilities. The assassination of John F. Kennedy was likewise prevented and he survived until May 1995, when he died at the age of 78 due to complications from Addison's disease. Attendees at his funeral included his younger brother Robert F. Kennedy and Reverend Dr. Martin Luther King Jr. By 1996, the president of the United States was little more than a figurehead for the country as not even the president could question the Prime Oracle's infinite wisdom.
- In the Elseworlds comic book miniseries Superman: Red Son, John Kennedy lost the 1960 election to Richard Nixon, who was later assassinated in Dallas, Texas on November 22, 1963. However, he was president by 1978. During his presidency, he had divorced his first wife Jacqueline Kennedy and married Norma Jeane Baker, becoming the first U.S. president to divorce and remarry while in office.
- In the film C.S.A.: The Confederate States of America, a 2004 mockumentary directed by Kevin Willmott which depicts a timeline in which the Confederacy won the American Civil War, completely annexed and absorbed the United States, and perpetuated slavery. By 1960, when only 29 percent of voters approve of slavery, Roman Catholic Republican John F. Kennedy is elected CSA president over Democrat Richard Nixon. However, foreign policy such as the Newfoundland Missile Crisis and an expansionist campaign in Southeast Asia distracts him, and he is unable to implement his domestic agenda before being assassinated. (Although Kennedy is referred to as the first Northern Confederate President in the film, the timeline on its online companion website contradicts this by stating that William McKinley and Theodore Roosevelt also served as president.)
- In the alternate history novel The Sky People by S. M. Stirling, John F. Kennedy served two full terms as the 35th President from 1961 to 1969. Although he was initially considered weak on anti-Communist matters, he was elected to a second term in 1964. His successful handling of the Vietnam War, the Thailand Border Crisis of 1966-1967 and the Six-Day War silenced the majority of his critics. The key US base on Mars was named after Kennedy.
- In the parallel universe featured in Fringe, the nonagenarian John F. Kennedy was serving as the United States Ambassador to the United Nations in May 2009 but planned to resign his position in order to lead a new US government agency aimed at slowing ecological breakdown.
- In the mockumentary What If...? Armageddon 1962, President-elect John F. Kennedy was assassinated by a 73-year-old postal worker named Richard Paul Pavlick in Palm Beach, Florida on December 11, 1960. Consequently, Vice President-elect Lyndon B. Johnson was inaugurated as the 35th President on January 20, 1961. Johnson's failure to settle the Cuban Missile Crisis led to a nuclear war in October 1962.
- In the alternate history short story Murdering Uncle Ho by Chris Bunch in the anthology Alternate Generals III edited by Harry Turtledove, President John F. Kennedy survives an assassination attempt on his life in 1963 and is later reelected to a second term in 1964. During Kennedy's second term, American participation in the Vietnam War surges with disastrous results.
- In the alternate history video game Dustborn, John F. Kennedy survived the assassination attempt on his life, but Jacqueline Kennedy Onnasis was killed. In the aftermath, Kennedy married Marilyn Monroe and established the militarized police force, Justice, to protect the United States from domestic threats. After Kennedy’s death in 1983, he was succeeded by the misguided Barren Sadler. Eventually, Samuel Ward became President, and turned America into a dictatorship, transforming Justice into an authoritarian agency.

=== John F. Kennedy Jr. ===
- In the 2019 alternate history short-story Election Day by Harry Turtledove, John F. Kennedy Jr. is convinced by his wife Carolyn Bessette-Kennedy not to fly them to Martha's Vineyard in July 1999. As a result, they are not killed and John enters politics in the early 2000s when he was elected the junior Senator from New York state. He and his wife Carolyn end up having a son in 2004. As Senator, Kennedy developed a solidly center-left record, supporting President Barack Obama's healthcare reform plans, among other things. Based on his record and his family name, Kennedy became the Democratic nominee for the presidency in 2016, facing off against the Republican nominee, Donald Trump. Kennedy's status as a scion was a mixed blessing. On one hand, there were still many who remembered and respected his father. On the other hand, many voters were wary about perpetuating another presidential dynastic movement so soon after the presidency of George W. Bush. However, Trump's complete lack of political experience, his status as a reality television host, and his "America First" style platform didn't prove to be a palatable alternative. Kennedy's comparative youth (he was fifteen years younger than Trump) and handsomeness also counted in his favor. In November, Kennedy and his running mate Michael Bennet achieve a very narrow victory in the electoral college. After Trump conceded, Kennedy gave his victory speech to a jubilant crowd in the New Yorker Hotel, thanking his supporters, and taking moment to thank Carolyn for convincing him not to fly them out to Martha's Vineyard he realized years later just how inexperienced he was, and that this victory was probably because of her.

=== Patrick Bouvier Kennedy ===
- Patrick Kennedy was elected in 2000 in the story "Prince Pat" by George Alec Effinger in the anthology Alternate Kennedys edited by Mike Resnick, defeating the incumbent Republican, former Secretary of State James A. Baker. In real life, Patrick Kennedy, son of President John F. Kennedy, was born August 7, 1963, and died two days later of infant respiratory distress syndrome. This would have made him, at 37, the youngest president in history. In style and plot, the story parallels the Shakespeare play Henry V.

=== Robert F. Kennedy ===
- The novel A Disturbance of Fate by Mitchell J. Freedman is premised on Robert Kennedy surviving Sirhan Sirhan's assassination attempt and going on to serve two successful terms as president with Ralph Yarborough as his vice president and eventual successor.
- In one of the episodes of What If? on the Discovery Channel, Robert Kennedy won the Democratic nomination in 1968 with Revd Dr Martin Luther King Jr. as his running mate. He defeated Richard Nixon and George Wallace in the general election to become the 37th President but was assassinated in September 1969.
- In the story "President-Elect" by Mark Aronson in the anthology Alternate Kennedys edited by Mike Resnick, Robert Kennedy survives his encounter with Sirhan Sirhan and adds a strong law and order theme to his campaign. Pressured by incumbent Lyndon B. Johnson to more closely toe the party line (or more precisely, the LBJ line) or else risk having his election sabotaged, Kennedy bolts and joins the Republicans, eventually becoming their nominee with former vice president Richard Nixon as his running mate. The Democrats nominate his brother Ted Kennedy to run with the incumbent Vice President Hubert Humphrey. Kennedy/Nixon barely edges Kennedy/Humphrey, but before he can be inaugurated, Robert is killed when he accidentally drives off a bridge at Chappaquiddick Island, leaving Nixon to become the 37th President.
- In the 1969 alternate history If Israel Lost the War by Richard Z. Chesnoff, Edward Klein and Robert Littell, Israel was defeated in the Six-Day War, Sirhan Sirhan went home to share in his people's victory celebrations, and Robert Kennedy passed unscathed through the kitchen of The Ambassador Hotel and went on to be elected as the 37th President. On entering office, Kennedy feels that the fall of Pro-Western Israel at the hands of the pro-Soviet Nasser's Egypt has dangerously tipped the global balance of forces, and he orders an escalation of the Vietnam War through a land invasion of North Vietnam. However, American forces get bogged down far short of Hanoi, due to intensive Vietnamese guerrilla activity plus the direct mass intervention of Chinese "volunteers", similar to those who fought in the Korean War. As a result, the President's popularity sharply plunges by 1969, when the book ends.
- In the short story "Fellow Americans" by Eileen Gunn contained in the anthology Alternate Presidents edited by Mike Resnick, Barry Goldwater defeated the early favorite and incumbent Lyndon B. Johnson in 1964 and went on to be re-elected in 1968. During his term in office, President Goldwater ordered that nuclear weapons be deployed against North Vietnam during the Vietnam War. In 1990, Robert Kennedy, who had never seriously sought the Democratic presidential nomination, was serving as the Governor of New York and proceedings had been instituted against him for an alleged impropriety which he had committed while in his office. While attending the opening ceremony of the 1990 New York World's Fair in the Tower of Diminished Expectations, Governor Kennedy was the subject of an attempted assassination but survived as he had been wearing a bullet proof vest. During his convalescence, he informed his wife Ethel Kennedy that he intended to seek the Democratic nomination for the 1992 presidential election and run against the incumbent Republican President George H. W. Bush, who was increasingly unpopular due to his perceived poor handling of the economic recession. However, as the would-be assassin had not been caught, Ethel was afraid that he would strike again and attempted to persuade her husband to abandon his plans to run for the presidency. Her efforts proved unsuccessful. Kennedy remained bitter that Johnson had chosen Hubert Humphrey as his running mate in the 1964 election as he was convinced that, with him on the ticket, Johnson would have defeated Goldwater and that he (Kennedy) would have gone on to be elected president himself in 1968.
- In the alternate history novella anthology Then Everything Changed by Jeff Greenfield, Robert F. Kennedy survived Sirhan Sirhan's attempt on his life on June 5, 1968 due to the intervention of his campaign manager and brother-in-law Stephen Smith, for which he would become the namesake of Kennedy's daughter Stephanie. After a recording of one of Eugene McCarthy's witticisms making light of violence against Kennedy is made public, Kennedy wins the New York primary, foricing McCarthy to suspend his campaign. Kennedy defeated incumbent Vice President Hubert Humphrey for the Democratic nomination after calling for the replacement of the winner-take-all unit rule for delegate apportionment with proportional representation in response to Mississippi's segregated delegation. Kennedy nominated North Carolina Governor Terry Sanford as his running mate. Due to the personal animosity between the two, Lyndon B. Johnson planned to reclaim the Democratic nomination at the convention after a diplomatic coup; after this plan was forestalled by the Soviet invasion of Czechoslovakia, Johnson resolved to swing the 1968 election in favor of Richard Nixon. Kennedy narrowly defeated both Nixon and George Wallace as a result of the resignations of Clark Clifford, Cyrus Vance and W. Averell Harriman in protest against Johnson's plans to halt the bombing of North Vietnam and campaigning orchestrated by the AFL–CIO and George Meany in opposition to Wallace. In co-operation with the outgoing Johnson administration, Kennedy would end the Vietnam War with the continued existence of South Vietnam albeit under a shaky coalition government. Robert Kennedy would institute a Police Corps program, pressure Neil Armstrong to quote John F. Kennedy during the Apollo 11 mission, appoint Nixon as a special envoy to the People's Republic of China, and renominate Arthur Goldberg to the Supreme Court. The Kennedy administration would be embroiled in the First Street Caper after fixer Paul Corbin installed a mole in Republican National Committee Headquarters to obtain campaign documents ahead of the 1970 midterm elections; congressional inquires ended largely exonerating the Kennedy administration of any direct involvement in the affair, albeit as a result of Democratic control of Congress and Corbin's attack line of similar acts being committed by Republicans, hinting about his knowledge of the Nixon campaign's discussions with South Vietnam to hold out for better terms for a negotiated peace.

=== Ted Kennedy ===
- Mentioned in The Simpsons episode "Bart to the Future" and was president sometime before Lisa Simpson.
- A list of US Presidents since the 1950s in Robert A. Heinlein's book Job: A Comedy of Justice (1984) concludes with "Eisenhower, Kennedy, Kennedy, Kennedy", presumably referring to both Robert F. Kennedy and Ted Kennedy as the second and third Kennedys. This joke was used earlier in A Boy and His Dog (1976) when the main character lists the presidents in order: "Eisenhower, Kennedy, Johnson, Nixon, Kennedy, Kennedy, Kennedy...". This list was also mentioned as the USA presidents in The Number of the Beast for Timeline 2 (the Future History timeline) as Woodrow Wilson, Harding, Coolidge, Hoover, Roosevelt, Truman, Eisenhower, Kennedy, Kennedy, Kennedy, Kennedy, Kennedy, Kennedy, ..., Neemiah Scudder Interregnum.
- Elected president in 1980 in the first edition of Jeffrey Archer's novel "Shall We Tell the President?". He had narrowly managed to defeat Jimmy Carter on the fifth ballot at the Democratic National Convention. He picked Arkansas Senator Dale Bumpers as his running mate and they defeated Illinois Governor James R. Thompson by 147,000 votes in the popular vote and became the 40th President. (In the revised edition, Florentyna Kane, from Archer's "Kane and Abel" and "The Prodigal Daughter" was the president.)
- In the first season of the television show For All Mankind, set in an alternate timeline where the Soviet Union reached the moon first in 1969, Ted Kennedy became the 38th president of the United States in 1972, having cancelled his trip to Chappaquiddick Island to deal with the aftermath and used congressional hearings into NASA's failings as a springboard for his presidential campaign. Having defeated Richard Nixon, Kennedy pardons him for any and all crimes he may have committed in relation to the break-in at the Watergate Office Building. Though Kennedy succeeds in securing the ratification of the Equal Rights Amendment in 1974 (using contracts with NASA as a bargaining chip to sway holdout states such as Illinois, resulting in the Saturn V disaster), and oversees the establishment of the Jamestown lunar base, his presidency is derailed by his extramarital affair with Mary Jo Kopechne. It is revealed through newsreel footage that he lost re-election to Ronald Reagan in 1976. Dying in 2009 (as he did in real-life), it is speculated that his nephew Senator John F. Kennedy Jr. will pursue a presidential campaign in the future.
- In the V for Vendetta comic series by Alan Moore and David Lloyd, Ted Kennedy was mentioned as being the incumbent president when global nuclear war broke out between the United States and the Soviet Union in the late 1980s, rendering continental Europe and Africa uninhabitable and precipitating the establishment of a totalitarian police state in Britain under Norsefire.

=== Rev. Dr Martin Luther King Jr. ===
- In an episode of What If? on the Discovery Channel, Martin Luther King was Vice President under Robert Kennedy and succeeded him as the 38th president in September 1969. Major of his initiatives are détente and continue program of Great Society (but under a new name). He was assassinated in 1971. He was succeeded by Vice President George McGovern.
- The alternate history novel The Two Georges by Richard Dreyfus and Harry Turtledove is set in a timeline where the American Revolution never occurred and the Thirteen Colonies along with the rest of British America were unified into the North American Union, a self-governing dominion within the British Empire. King-Emperor Charles III had appointed Martin Luther King as the Governor-general of the North American Union, who had to deal with the political ramifications of the theft and ransom of the titular painting and the attempted assassinations of the King-Emperor, both of which were in part orchestrated by the Franco-Spanish Holy Alliance.

=== Joseph Rudyard Kipling ===
- In The Alteration by Kingsley Amis, the Reformation never occurs and thus Catholicism and the Papacy dominate much of the world. Protestant or 'schismatic' theology is restricted to the breakaway Republic of New England which is governed by a 'First Citizen'. Kipling is mentioned as having served as First Citizen between 1914 and 1918.

== L ==
=== Robert M. La Follette, Sr. ===
- In the short story "Fighting Bob" by Kristine Kathryn Rusch contained in the anthology Alternate Presidents edited by Mike Resnick, Robert La Follette won the 1924 election. He was the Progressive Party candidate, defeating the Republican incumbent Calvin Coolidge and their Democratic opponent John W. Davis. He entered office as the 31st President on March 4, 1925. However, his term in office proved to be short-lived as he died on June 18, 1925 (as he did in real life). After William Henry Harrison, who died after one month in office on April 4, 1841, he was the second shortest-serving president in US history. He was succeeded by his vice president Burton K. Wheeler, who became the 32nd President. Given that La Follette was 69 years old in 1924, he was the oldest man ever to be elected to the presidency.

=== Fiorello H. La Guardia ===
- Fiorello La Guardia was elected president in 1951 in the 1939 Robert Heinlein novel For Us, The Living: A Comedy of Customs, after democracy was restored from an extreme-right dictatorship in the late 1940s. La Guardia served two terms, mainly concerned in a titanic struggle with the banks, ending with the American banks effectively nationalised and a system of social credit established. Posterity remembers him as one of the United States' greatest presidents.

=== Rose Wilder Lane ===
- In the alternate history novel The Probability Broach as part of the North American Confederacy Series by L. Neil Smith in which the United States became a libertarian state after a successful Whiskey Rebellion and the overthrowing and execution of George Washington by firing squad for treason in 1794, Rose Wilder Lane served as the 21st President of the North American Confederacy from 1940 to 1952. After Harriet Beecher Stowe, she was the second woman to hold the office.

=== Lyndon LaRouche ===
- In two parallel universes featured in the Sliders Season Two episode "Time Again and World", Lyndon LaRouche was president in 1996. In these universes, the United States had been under martial law since the assassination of John F. Kennedy by Julius and Ethel Rosenberg on November 22, 1963.

=== Lê Đức Thọ ===
- Lê Đức Thọ was president in a story in The Onion publication Our Dumb Century, where Gerald Ford surrenders the United States to the Viet Cong after the end of the Vietnam War. Lê's policies include renaming Washington, DC to New Hanoi, DC; arresting Ford and his cabinet; and converting the US to a collectivized-agrarian economy.

=== Robert LeFevre ===
- In the alternate history novel The Probability Broach as part of the North American Confederacy Series by L. Neil Smith in which the United States became a libertarian state after a successful Whiskey Rebellion and the overthrowing and execution of George Washington by firing squad for treason in 1794, Robert LeFevre served as the 23rd President of the North American Confederacy from 1960 to 1968.

=== Curtis LeMay ===
- In the alternate history novel 11/22/63 by Stephen King, Curtis LeMay was elected as vice president in 1968. He became president after George Wallace was assassinated by Arthur Bremer on May 15, 1972. However, Senator Hubert Humphrey of Minnesota defeated him to become the Democratic presidential nominee in the 1972 election, which he won.

=== Joe Lieberman ===
- In the satirical novel Why Not Me? by Al Franken, the author portrayed himself as being elected as the 43rd president in 2000, running as a dark horse candidate on a platform of eliminating ATM fees. He is eventually given the Democratic nomination over the incumbent vice president and early favorite Al Gore due in a rise in support when the Y2K bug solely effects ATMs. He was the first Jewish President and won the election in a landslide. Senator Joe Lieberman of Connecticut was his running mate, making the Franken-Lieberman ticket the first all-Jewish presidential ticket since Reconstruction. President Franken suffered from severe depression and mood swings. For instance, he attacked Nelson Mandela and appointed Sandy Koufax as Secretary of Veterans Affairs. Franken resigned after 144 days in office on June 10, 2001. In his resignation speech, he said: "It is my fondest wish that, in the fullness of time, the American people will look back on the Franken presidency as something of a mixed bag and not as a complete disaster." Lieberman succeeded him as the 44th President, going on to serve a total of eighteen years in office. In stark contrast to Franken, President Lieberman was widely considered to be one of the greatest Presidents in US history. Notably, the novel, which was written in 1999, correctly predicted that Lieberman would be the Democratic vice presidential nominee in the 2000 election, though with Gore rather than Franken as the presidential candidate.

=== Rush Limbaugh ===
- Rush Limbaugh portrays himself as president in The 1/2 Hour News Hour. Ann Coulter serves as his vice president.

=== Abraham Lincoln ===
. (By definition, any different course or outcome of the American Civil War would have involved a different life and presidency for Abraham Lincoln.)

- In the parallel universe known as Earth-Three, which formed a part of the original DC Multiverse and was introduced in Justice League of America #29 (August 1964), Abraham Lincoln was an actor who assassinated President John Wilkes Booth.
- In the alternate history novel For Want of a Nail: If Burgoyne Had Won at Saratoga by the business historian Robert Sobel, Abraham Lincoln was a railroad lawyer in the Confederation of Indiana, one of the original five confederations which made up the Confederation of North America (CNA). At some point after 1861, Lincoln was one of two lawyers who assisted Patrick Gallivan extend his Indiana Northern Railroad to Manitoba in the north and through Southern Vandalia to connect to Mexican railroads in the South, making Gallivan the master of rail transport in the western CNA.
- In the short story "How the South Preserved the Union" by Ralph Roberts included in the anthology Alternate Presidents edited by Mike Resinck, David Rice Atchison, a prominent pro-slavery activist, became the 13th President following the deaths of his predecessor Zachary Taylor and Vice President Millard Fillmore in a carriage accident. Several months after President Atchison's accession, the American Civil War broke out on April 17, 1849, with the secession of Massachusetts from the Union and the Second Battle of Lexington and Concord, from which the rebelling abolitionists, who styled themselves as the New Minutemen, emerged victorious. New Hampshire and Vermont seceded shortly thereafter and were soon followed by the rest of New England, New York, New Jersey and Pennsylvania. The seceding Northeastern states banded together to form the New England Confederacy with Daniel Webster as its first and only president and the revolutionary abolitionist John Brown as the commander of its army. The war came to an end in 1855, two years after President Atchison had issued a proclamation promising that any slave who fought in the United States Army would be granted his freedom following the end of the war and that any factory slave who worked satisfactorily would be granted his or her freedom after the war and would be paid for that work from then onwards. Later on, President Stephen A. Douglas (who was elected in 1860) introduces the Civil Rights Act of 1861, which abolishes slavery throughout the entire United States. Abraham Lincoln "never rose higher than a seedy congressman from Illinois" and was regarded as "a vulgar, incompetent man who amounted to little and accomplished less." He was eventually shot and killed in a barroom brawl in 1865 by an actor named John Wilkes Booth in a dispute over theater tickets. In the late 1880s, a science fiction dime novel was published which portrayed an alternate history in which Lincoln became president, the Civil War did not begin until 1861 and it was the slaveholding South rather than the North which seceded from the Union and formed the Confederacy. However, the novel was largely dismissed as the idea of Lincoln becoming president was regarded as being laughably far-fetched.
- In the short story "Lincoln's Charge" by Bill Fawcett, also contained in the anthology Alternate Presidents edited by Mike Resnick, Abraham Lincoln was defeated by Stephen A. Douglas, who became the 16th President, in the 1860 election. In the hope of avoiding warfare, President Douglas attempted to reach a compromise with the Southern representatives in the Congress. The Manumission Act of 1862 was intended to preserve the Union by freeing the slaves over a period of ten years, giving everyone time to adjust. While Douglas heralded the law as another great compromise analogous to the Compromise of 1850, the Southern representatives formed the Confederate States of America and began arming for war. After the outbreak of the American Civil War later on that year, Douglas was fearful of further provoking the South and did not introduce conscription as the Confederacy had done. Consequently, the professional though much smaller U.S. Army was overwhelmed and nearly destroyed by the Confederate army at the Second Battle of Manassas in Virginia in 1862. It took the United States over a year to recover from this disaster, creating a period of false peace. Although everyone in the North initially welcomed it, the false peace gave both sides time to build their armies as well as providing an opportunity for the United Kingdom to decide to support the Confederacy with the full backing of the British Empire's diplomacy and trade. Douglas continued to negotiate with the Confederacy in an attempt to reach a compromise, failing to understand that every day lost meant another victory for the South. Lincoln accepted a commission as the commanding general of the Illinois Militia in the Union Army. His own commanding officer was Brigadier General Ulysses S. Grant. General Lincoln believed that he would have been able to prevent the war if he had been elected or, failing that, would have shown the kind of decisive leadership of which Douglas was seemingly incapable, built a real army and crushed the Confederacy before they were able to build a large army of their own. Shortly after leading his troops into battle for the first time in 1863, Lincoln was shot and killed by a Confederate sharpshooter while still on horseback. Although the story ends with Lincoln's death, it is heavily implied that the Confederacy will eventually win the war with the support of the British and establish an independent nation.
- Abraham Lincoln had strongly backed the military appointment of John Alexander McClernand, a prominent War Democrat. In our history this did not have far-reaching consequences, but in the divergent timeline of MacKinlay Kantor's If the South Had Won the Civil War it had disastrous results for the US and for Lincoln himself. In this timeline General Ulysses Grant was killed by being accidentally thrown off his horse on May 12, 1863, at the start of the Vicksburg Campaign. In the aftermath, McClernand insisted on assuming command despite being a political appointee who was not fitted for the job. By thoroughly bad generalship, McClernand managed to totally lose the Vicksburg Campaign and get the Army of Tennessee almost completely destroyed. Soon afterward, at the Battle of Gettysburg, Robert E. Lee made some better decisions than in our history and won the battle and largely destroy the Union Army of the Potomac as well. Two such major disasters following one upon the other caused a panic reaction in the North. Washington, D.C. descended into total chaos, with mobs running through the streets, looting, raping and lynching Blacks, and Lee's army captured the city without firing a shot and proceeded to restore order. With the mobs howling for Abraham Lincoln's blood, it was safest for him to be taken into a comfortable custody at Richmond, Virginia, from where he sent northwards a letter announcing his resignation and conceding the Confederacy's victory. Vice President Hannibal Hamlin became president following Lincoln's resignation. The captured Lincoln did succeed in prevailing upon Jefferson Davis to respect the wishes of West Virginians and let them stay in the Union - a small face-saving gain to the defeated North which helped create better relations later. In 1864 Lincoln was released by the Confederates and started a law office in Chicago, which did surprisingly well — but despite all the differences from out history, he still got murdered by John Wilkes Booth, in this case at a Chicago theater.
- In Harry Turtledove's alternate history novel The Guns of the South, several members of the South African white supremacist organisation Afrikaner Weerstandsbeweging traveled back in time from 2014 to January 1864 and provided Confederate army general Robert E. Lee's Army of Northern Virginia with AK-47s, allowing the Confederate States of America to win the American Civil War, which became known as the Second American Revolution. Abraham Lincoln remained in Washington, D.C. even with the defeat of the U.S. Army in the face of the Confederate AK-47s at the Battle of Bealeton. Upon the arrival of the Army of Northern Virginia, Lincoln invited General Lee into the White House to negotiate an armistice, ending the war. He spent the remainder of his term attempting to negotiate favorable terms with the Confederacy in the final peace. In the 1864 election, Lincoln won 40.6% of the popular vote with 1,638,415 votes and carried twelve states (Maine, New Hampshire, Vermont, Massachusetts, Rhode Island, Connecticut, Michigan, West Virginia, Illinois, Minnesota, Iowa, and Nevada) with 83 electoral votes. However, he was narrowly defeated by the Democratic candidate Horatio Seymour, who carries ten states with 138 electoral votes and becomes the 17th President. After leaving office, Lincoln toured Missouri and Kentucky, agitating tirelessly in favor of the two disputed states remaining in the Union. In the post-war plebiscites, Missouri voted to remain in the Union whereas Kentucky voted to join the Confederacy. Lincoln then returned to Illinois where he practiced law and grew old in obscurity.
- In Turtledove's alternate history short story "Must and Shall", Abraham Lincoln was killed by a Confederate army sharpshooter at the Battle of Fort Stevens on July 12, 1864, while observing General Jubal Early's attack. He was succeeded by his Vice President Hannibal Hamlin, who became the 17th President. President Hamlin used his predecessor's death as justification for the oppressive peace imposed upon the former Confederate States following the defeat of the Great Rebellion. This involved a harsh occupation of the rebellious states, the destruction of their economy and further racial division due to the promotion of blacks to important offices, leading to great animosity between the inhabitants of the North and South. The complete military control of the former Confederacy by the U.S. continued until at least 1942, at which time Nazi Germany smuggled weapons into the South to stir up revolt and distract the U.S. government.
- In a parallel universe featured in the Sliders Season Two episode "Obsession", a young psychic from San Francisco predicted Abraham Lincoln's assassination in Ford's Theatre on April 14, 1865 and thereby prevented his death. Lincoln was so grateful and impressed that he created a cabinet post known as the Prime Oracle, whose job was to predict natural and manmade disasters. He and his successors were so successful that millions of American citizens came to trust and believe in psychic abilities. By 1996, the President of the United States was little more than a figurehead for the country as not even the president could question the Prime Oracle's infinite wisdom.
- In the short story "The Lincoln Train" by Maureen F. McHugh contained in the anthology Alternate Tyrants edited by Mike Resnick, Abraham Lincoln was the victim of an assassination attempt in Ford's Theatre on April 14, 1865. He survived but John Wilkes Booth's bullet remained lodged in his brain and he was rendered a vegetable. William H. Seward, the Secretary of State, succeeded him as the 17th President. President Seward organised population transfers of Southern civilians to the Western territories where they were left to die of starvation and disease.
- In the alternate history novel How Few Remain by Harry Turtledove, the first novel of the Southern Victory series, General Robert E. Lee's Army of Northern Virginia forced the Army of the Potomac under the command of General George B. McClellan onto the banks of the Susquehanna River in Pennsylvania and destroys the opposing army in the Battle of Camp Hill on October 1, 1862. Following this decisive victory, Lee moved eastward and occupied Philadelphia. As a direct result, the Confederate States of America earned diplomatic recognition from the United Kingdom and France, which forced the United States to mediate. The Confederacy therefore gains full recognition in the War of Secession came to an end on November 4, 1862. In the 1864 election, Abraham Lincoln was soundly defeated and left office in disgrace. Returning to private life, Lincoln developed an interest in workers' rights. Influenced by Karl Marx's The Communist Manifesto, he spent most of the following two decades touring the United States and gained a reputation as a staunch socialist. During a trip to St. Louis in 1877, he and his wife Mary Todd Lincoln both contracted typhoid. Lincoln survived but Mary would die from it. Following his election in 1880, President James G. Blaine, the only Republican other than Lincoln to ever hold the office, led the United States into another losing war, the Second Mexican War (1881–1882), with the Confederacy and its European allies which cost the US a section of the state of Maine to be annexed into the Canadian province of New Brunswick as one of the terms of the armistice. This second disastrous war in less than twenty years instigated by a Republican president doomed the party to political irrelevance. After one last attempt to convince Republican leaders to make workers' rights the central issue of their platform at a decisive meeting in Chicago, Illinois in 1882, Lincoln and many of his followers defected to the Socialist Party. While in Chicago, he stayed with his eldest and only surviving son Robert Todd Lincoln, who worked as an attorney for the Pullman Company. The younger Lincoln continued his involvement with the Republicans, making no secret of his disapproval for his father's politics and, to that end, opposed his defection to the Socialists. While he continued to welcome his father at his home, he forbade him to invite Socialists into it. In the years after the end of the Second Mexican War, the Socialist Party surpassed the Republican Party as the nation's second party. In spite of this, it would not become the majority party in the House of Representatives until 1918 and would not win the presidency until the election of Upton Sinclair in 1920, which ended 36 consecutive years of Democratic control of the Powel House. Lincoln was widely reviled in the United States and among the white population of the Confederate States for his role in the War of Secession, although he was viewed positively by Confederate blacks. He was almost universally considered to be the worst president in US history.
- In the alternate history short story "Lee at the Alamo" by Harry Turtledove, Abraham Lincoln was elected as the 16th president in 1860 which prompted several slave states to secede from the Union and form the Confederate States of America, as occurred in real life. The first battle of the American Civil War took place in Texas, one of the seceding states, from February to March 1861, as Lt. Colonel Robert E. Lee opted to defend U.S. property at the Alamo, rather than surrender it to the Texas Militia. It came known as the Second Battle of the Alamo. While Lee was ultimately forced to surrender, he became a national hero. When President Lincoln learned that Lee had refused the position of Commander of the Union Army, he arranged to meet with Lee in the White House. With some careful words and persuasion, Lincoln convinced Lee to remain with the Union, rather than join his home state of Virginia in secession. Lee, realizing Lincoln's sincerity, agreed to take a commanding position in the west, and stipulated that he be allowed to retire if he were asked to fight his fellow Virginians. Lincoln agreed, and went one better, promising Lee a farm should he retire. As the story ended in April 1861, neither Lincoln's fate nor the outcome of the war were established.
- In the Elseworlds one-shot comic book Superman: A Nation Divided in which Kal-El's spaceship landed in Kansas during the 1840s and he was raised by a farming couple named Josephus and Sarah Kent, Abraham Lincoln received reports from General Ulysses S. Grant concerning the superhuman individual Private Atticus Kent and his tremendous contributions to the Union war effort in 1863. Initially, Lincoln was sceptical of this story until Atticus came to the Oval Office while the President was meeting with the abolitionist Frederick Douglass and demonstrated his powers. Consequently, Lincoln realised Atticus's potential and understood that his powers must be used for the good of the nation. Atticus later decisively participated in the Battle of Gettysburg where he ended the battle by capturing Confederate States Army Generals J.E.B. Stuart and Robert E. Lee. Atticus instructed the latter to instruct the Confederate States Army to surrender. Afterward, Atticus spent two days burying the dead at Gettysburg and was present at Lincoln's Gettysburg Address. Despite General Lee's surrender, Atticus continued to put down continuing Confederate resistance and soon captured Confederate States President Jefferson Davis, thus ending the war. During the Union celebration, Lincoln invited Kent to attend a performance of the Shakespearean comedy As You Like It in Ford's Theatre, where the President was almost the subject of an assassination attempt at the hands of the actor and Confederate sympathiser John Wilkes Booth. Using his superhearing, Atticus heard Booth preparing to fire his pistol and threw him off the balcony. Booth was killed when he landed on his own dagger. As a result, Lincoln was provided with a Secret Service organised by Atticus on September 7, 1863. Furthermore, Lincoln recruited Atticus' help in overseeing the Reconstruction of the former Confederate States of America on May 23, 1864. Atticus later attended Lincoln's second inauguration on March 4, 1865, on the steps of the completed Capitol Dome.
- In the essay "If Booth Had Missed Lincoln" by Milton Waldman - part of the classic 1931 collection If It Had Happened Otherwise - Booth's gun fails to fire at Ford's Theatre on April 14, 1865, and he is put in an insane asylum. Abraham Lincoln is charged with mismanaging the recently concluded Civil War, and there is repeated friction between Lincoln and a hostile United States Congress. Before Congress can impeach him in 1867, however, Lincoln dies, discredited and castigated as a spendthrift warmonger. Lincoln's role in this story is similar to that of his successor Andrew Johnson in real history.
- Similar to the above, in the alternate history novel The Impeachment of Abraham Lincoln by Stephen L. Carter, Abraham Lincoln survived the Confederate sympathiser John Wilkes Booth's attempt on his life in Ford's Theatre on April 14, 1865 whereas Vice President Andrew Johnson was assassinated by Booth's co-conspirator George Atzerodt on the same night. During his second term, the Radical Republicans, led by Senator Thaddeus Stevens, came to see Lincoln's failure to punish the South and to protect its freed slaves as akin to treason. Furthermore, the Democrats and the former Confederates regarded Lincoln as a tyrant who imposed his will in violation of the United States Constitution. These disparate groups formed a coalition against Lincoln and the accuse him of wartime crimes for having suspended habeas corpus, taking millions from the Treasury without Congressional approval, declaring martial law and conspiring to overthrow Congress. Consequently, the House of Representatives vote to impeach him in the spring of 1867 and faced trial in the Senate, where his attorney was a 21-year-old African American woman named Abigail Canner.
- In Terry Bisson's Fire on the Mountain, John Brown succeeded in his raid on Harper's Ferry and touched off a slave rebellion in 1859, as he intended. The rebellion spread far, developing into a full-fledged war throughout the South, the rebellious slaves joined by numerous European radicals such as Garibaldi. John Brown did not survive to the end, but Harriet Tubman and Frederick Douglass assumed leadership and eventually won the war, detaching the Deep South and making of it the predominantly Black Republic of New Africa. Abraham Lincoln, a prominent Whig politician, was bitterly opposed to the United States accepting the loss of its Southern portion to the Black rebels. Lincoln continued to agitate and - though he had no legal authority for it - managed to raise and equip a considerable army which he himself commanded. Under the slogan "One Union Forever!" Lincoln proceeded to lead an invasion of New Africa with the intention of restoring its territory to the United States, but was defeated and killed in a bitter battle, along with most of his troops. New Africa prospered and its Black citizens remembered Lincoln with loathing as the most intransigent of their foes.
- In Robert Skimin's Gray Victory, in 1864 General Johnston remains in command of Atlanta and keeps his soldiers inside the fortifications, fighting a long-drawn siege war of attrition until the Northern elections of November 1864. Abraham Lincoln loses the support of the war-weary voters and George B. McClellan is elected president. McClellan orders a cease-fire, followed by a peace in which the independence of the South is recognized. The defeated Lincoln remains alive, with Booth having no reason to assassinate him, and remains a hero to many. Blacks in the Confederacy, denied the freedom which Lincoln promised in his Emancipation Proclamation, create a strong organization named "Abraham" in Lincoln's honor, determined to achieve their freedom by themselves. Lincoln is touched and sympathetic to their struggle, but stays clear of the plots by radical abolitionists to re-ignite the war.
- In the 2004 mockumentary CSA: The Confederate States of America, Abraham Lincoln served as the sixteenth and final President of the United States after the Confederate States get the United Kingdom and France to help them win the Civil War. American general Ulysses S. Grant surrenders to Robert E. Lee on April 9, 1864, after the Confederate army captures Washington, D.C. Also, the Confederacy annexes the remaining parts of the United States and the title of President of the United States is abolished. Lincoln attempts to escape to Canada (in blackface) with the help of Harriet Tubman. However, they are caught by Confederate soldiers and captured. Tubman is executed and Lincoln is imprisoned. In 1866, he is pardoned by Jefferson Davis and exiled to Canada. Lincoln remains in Canada until he died in June 1905 at the age of 96. Shortly before his death, Lincoln laments not having made the Civil War a battle to end slavery.
- In the alternate history novel The Probability Broach by L. Neil Smith in which the United States became a libertarian state known as the North American Confederacy in 1794, "an obscure Illinois lawyer" assassinated actor John Wilkes Booth in 1865.
- In the parallel universe Dixie-1 (first introduced in GURPS Alternate Earths), due to the Confederacy receiving support from a Nicaragua still under the control of William Walker, Robert E. Lee won the Battle of Antietam, in turn forcing the Union led by Abraham Lincoln to grant the Confederacy its independence in 1863 under threat of Britain aiding the confederacy, with Lincoln resigning afterwards.
- Abraham Lincoln is shown as the incumbent President in Evil Con Carne, which takes place in 2002.

=== Charles Lindbergh ===
- Charles Lindbergh appears in The Plot Against America, an alternate history novel by Philip Roth. After becoming the Republican nominee at the 1940 brokered convention, he defeated President Franklin D. Roosevelt in the 1940 election to become the 33rd President by playing upon the public's fears of going to war. Once in office, he cancels defense-related agreements with the Allies, and signs non-aggression treaties with Nazi Germany and with the Empire of Japan, which he justifies on the grounds that they will keep America out of war, and that the Axis are doing the world a favor by fighting and destroying communism in the Soviet Union and China. At home, he implements via the Office for American Absorption (OAA) the Just Folks and Homestead '42 programs designed to marginalize the Jewish community in the US, with the latter mandating the relocation of jobs to the Midwest and South, likely to swing the 1942 congressional elections in the Republicans' favor. Henry Ford serves as his Secretary of Interior, the OAA being an agency of the U.S. Department of the Interior. In 1942, he visits Louisville, Kentucky to address the assassination of Walter Winchell, who was undertaking a speaking tour as part of a presidential campaign in opposition to Lindbergh. He mysteriously disappeared when flying back to Washington, D.C., whereupon he was succeeded by Vice President Burton K. Wheeler who oversaw eight days of martial law. At the end of the novel, Evelyn Bengelsdorf (née Finkel, Roth's aunt and a key figure in the OAA) recounted a conspiracy theory that years earlier, German agents had kidnapped Lindbergh's only son and used him as leverage ever since to force Lindbergh to obey them, dispatching Lindbergh when he said that the American people would not accept the Final Solution being brought to America; Roth said that Evelyn's conspiracy theory was the most far-fetched and "unbelievable" explanation for Lindbergh's disappearance, but "not necessarily the least convincing". In an emergency presidential election held concurrently with the 1942 midterm elections, Roosevelt is re-elected to the White House, and the U.S. enters the war on the Allied side.
- In the miniseries of the same name, Lindbergh went on to defeat Roosevelt in the 1940 election as he did in the novel, albeit winning the Republican nomination in the primaries rather than at a brokered convention. The plot of the series broadly follows that of the novel, until the final episode. Lindbergh is implied to have been killed as part of a plot by Britain, Canada and anti-fascist, pro-Roosevelt Americans (including Philip's cousin, Alvin) in order to bring the United States into the war on the side of the Allies; Rabbi Lionel and Evelyn Bengelsdorf's conspiracy theory regarding the Lindbergh kidnapping is largely ignored, with their strong ties to the Lindbergh administration rendering them as social pariahs; and the result of the 1942 emergency presidential election is left unknown with voter suppression and ballot destruction taking place on Election Day.
- He is also president in the 1973 alternate history The Ultimate Solution (1973) by Eric Norden. Unlike in Roth's book, he is not elected but made a puppet president by the Nazis after they conquer the US in the 1950s, on a par with the Norwegian Vidkun Quisling, and remains at this job until 1973 when he – together with most of the world's population – is killed in a nuclear war between Nazi Germany and the Empire of Japan.
- Lindbergh as president has a more minor role in the history another Nazi-victorious timeline, the unpleasant GURPS timeline known as Reich-5. In this timeline Giuseppe Zangara succeeded in assassinating Franklin Delano Roosevelt in 1933. He was followed by Garner, after whom Lindbergh gained power, followed by Henry Wallace. All of them proved unable to handle the Great Depression - finally leading to the far-right William Dudley Pelley, who became president following Lindbergh's assassination and getting elected to a full in 1944, assuming dictatorial powers, and inviting the Nazis to conquer the US to help him against the pro-democracy resistance, ending with a totally Nazi-dominated world.
- Charles Lindbergh is president in the novel K is for Killing by Daniel Easterman. He is elected as the 32nd president in 1932 with D. C. Stephenson as his vice president. Stephenson arranges the assassination of Lindbergh and his wife in 1940 to prevent him from learning about a secret plan to collaborate with Nazi Germany on atomic weapons.
- Charles Lindbergh is president in the novel Farthing (2006) by Jo Walton. In a world where the United Kingdom and Nazi Germany reached a peace arrangement in 1941, Lindberg is president in 1949. He is preparing to meet with the Emperor of Japan Hirohito to strengthen ties between the two countries.

=== Belva Ann Lockwood ===
- In the short story "Love Our Lockwood" by Janet Kagan in the anthology Alternate Presidents edited by Mike Resnick, Belva Ann Lockwood defeated the incumbent Democratic Grover Cleveland and their Republican opponent Benjamin Harrison in the 1888 presidential election to become the 23rd President. The first woman to hold the office, she ran as the Equal Rights Party candidate. Her vice president was Alfred H. Love. President Lockwood inspired both male and female suffragettes. She lost her bid for re-election to Cleveland in 1892, who took office as the 24th President on March 4, 1893. He had previously served as the 22nd President from 1885 to 1889.

=== Huey Long ===
- In the Hearts of Iron IV mod Kaiserreich, Huey Long can take power via a Second American Civil War, in which he can lead an "American People's Government" in the south against a Militarist Federal Government, a Syndicalist revolution and a remnant of Democracy in the West Coast. If he wins, he continues his social reforms, but dismantles Democracy and sics his Minuteman Paramilitary on Enemies. The Mod Developers have stated his path is based less on his historical self and more on Buzz Windrip in It Can't Happen Here.
- In the short story "Kingfish" by Barry N. Malzberg in the anthology Alternate Presidents edited by Mike Resnick, Huey Long avoids his assassination in 1935 and runs for president in 1936 as an independent. He defeats Franklin D. Roosevelt and becomes the 33rd President. He invited Adolf Hitler to visit the United States, and allowed him to be assassinated via a bomb in 1938, leading to war with Nazi Germany. Although he had previously told his Vice President John Nance Garner that he did not intend to run for re-election in 1940, Garner became increasingly skeptical that Long would keep his word and therefore provide him with the opportunity to run. His suspicions were confirmed following the outbreak of the war.
- In the video game We Happy Few, Huey Long is elected President after the assassination of Franklin D. Roosevelt. Long keeps America out of World War II.
