= The Great War: American Front =

Book by Harry Turtledove

- First edition
- Author: Harry Turtledove
- Cover artist: George Pratt
- Language: English
- Series: Great War
- Genre: Alternate history novel
- Publisher: Del Rey
- Publication date: May 12, 1998
- Publication place: United States
- Media type: Print (Hardcover & Paperback)
- Pages: 562
- ISBN: 0-345-40615-X
- OCLC: 38081533
- Dewey Decimal: 813/.54 21
- LC Class: PS3570.U76 G74 1998
- Preceded by: How Few Remain
- Followed by: The Great War: Walk in Hell

The Great War: American Front is the first alternate history novel in the Great War trilogy by Harry Turtledove. It is the second part of Turtledove's Southern Victory series of novels. It takes the Southern Victory Series from 1914 to 1915.

== Plot summary ==
After a prologue with Robert E. Lee smashing the Army of the Potomac at the Battle of Camp Hill, Pennsylvania due to him not losing Special Order 191, in October 1862, and the subsequent Anglo-French diplomatic recognition of the Confederate States of America. The embittered Abraham Lincoln tells British Ambassador Richard Lyons that the United States would eventually get even by finding a European ally to match both the United Kingdom and France; the Ambassador laughs scornfully, but Lincoln's prophecy comes true when by 1914 the US would be the firm ally of Imperial Germany.

In the larger Southern Victory Series context, the CSA and the USA remained hostile powers toward one another during the decades between 1862 and 1914. A second military defeat of the USA by the CSA in the Second Mexican War (1881–1882) greatly intensified the resentment and hatred of the Confederate States in the USA, where Remembrance Day becomes a grim official holiday marking the 1882 surrender and keeping alive the dream of revenge for the two humiliations inflicted by the South.

The novel's main plot begins on June 28, 1914, the same day Archduke Franz Ferdinand and his wife Sophie, Duchess of Hohenberg of Austria-Hungary, are assassinated in Sarajevo by Nedeljko Čabrinović with a bomb thrown into their car and explodes (as opposed to Gavrilo Princip with a gun in our timeline), with the incident drawing the European powers into a whirlwind of war. At the eruption of an alternate World War I known as the Great War, the USA and CSA find themselves on opposite sides of the divide between the Central Powers and the Entente Powers, respectively. The fighting in Europe quickly spreads to North America, where the pro-German United States under President Theodore Roosevelt and 75-year-old General George Armstrong Custer declare war on President Woodrow Wilson's CSA, which are allied with the United Kingdom, France, and Russia. After the Confederate seizure of Washington, D.C., and invasion into Pennsylvania, and initial US invasions of Kentucky, Canada, and western Virginia, the conflict bogs down into trench warfare.

By the end of novel, in the autumn of 1915, the Confederates have been slowly driven out of Pennsylvania and back into Maryland, while poison gas assists the U.S. Army's slow advance through Kentucky. Across the Mississippi River, in the western part of the continent, the conflict is a war of movement, with the U.S. pushing deep into Sequoyah (our world's Oklahoma) and Confederate-owned Sonora. In the wider world the war has gone much the same as in actual history but the U.S has successfully conquered the Sandwich Islands (Hawaii) from Britain, and Argentina has joined the Entente and is fighting Central-Powers' allied Chile.

In Canada, British and Canadian forces are slowly driven back to Guelph, Ontario and U.S. soldiers successfully establish a foothold on the north bank of the St. Lawrence River. Winnipeg remains in Canadian hands, enabling Canada to remain in the war.

The novel ends with the beginning of a Marxist rebellion of African Americans against the war-distracted government of the CSA.

Most of the characters in the book are everyday people caught up in the bigger world of a global war. One main character in the book who goes on to play a major role in the series is a Confederate artillery sergeant named Jake Featherston.

This book is followed by The Great War: Walk in Hell, and then The Great War: Breakthroughs.

== Similar works ==
The idea that in 1914 Theodore Roosevelt is President of the Union while Woodrow Wilson is President of the Confederacy also came up in MacKinlay Kantor's If the South Had Won the Civil War, published in magazine form in 1960 and book form in 1961. In an introduction to a reprint of that volume, Turtledove said that idea was too good not to use in his own series (in Kantor's version, the USA and CSA are allies in both World Wars, fighting together against Germany and finally reuniting in 1961).

Three decades earlier, the short fiction "If Robert E. Lee Had NOT Won the Battle of Gettysburg" by Winston Churchill, published in If It Had Happened Otherwise (1931), had used the same idea.

== Reception ==
SF Site gave the book a mixed review, stating that "there are simply too many characters in too many different theatres of war and far too much jump-cutting between them" but "Despite my criticisms, in the end I came away from American Front with a deeper appreciation for the world I really live in". Kirkus were also critical in their review, calling the book a "A workmanlike yarn whose connection to reality, insecure at the outset, grows more tenuous with every turning page". Publishers Weekly were more praising in their review, calling it "state-of-the-art alternate history, nothing less" and giving the book a star review.
