= The Great War: Walk in Hell =

1999 book by Harry Turtledove

- First edition
- Author: Harry Turtledove
- Cover artist: George Pratt
- Language: English
- Series: Great War
- Genre: Alternate history novel
- Publisher: Ballantine
- Publication date: August 3, 1999
- Publication place: United States
- Media type: Print (Hardcover & Paperback)
- Pages: 484
- ISBN: 0-345-40561-7
- OCLC: 41086667
- Preceded by: The Great War: American Front
- Followed by: The Great War: Breakthroughs

The Great War: Walk in Hell is the second book in the Great War series of alternate history books by Harry Turtledove. It is also the third part of the Southern Victory (unofficial title). It takes the Southern Victory Series from 1915 to 1916.

== Plot summary ==
The United States and Confederate States are locked in a stalemate as both of their offensives have stalled; the U.S. in Kentucky pushing south, the C.S.A. in Maryland pushing north. The Confederacy must also deal with their black population rising up in rebellion driven by Marxist doctrine, and a change in administration as President Woodrow Wilson's term ends.

In the Confederate States Presidential Election of 1915, Whig Vice President Gabriel Semmes (apparently a fictitious relative of real life Confederate Navy officer Raphael Semmes) is elected President by a wide margin over Radical Liberal candidate Doroteo Arango of Chihuahua to succeed Wilson.

The war begins to turn in the favor of the U.S. as the Kentucky offensive, led by George Armstrong Custer, manages to conquer enough of Kentucky to readmit it into the Union after 54 years as a member of the Confederacy. He uses the new invention known as "barrels" (tanks) to break through.

The Confederacy, conversely, has begun to lose its gains in southern Pennsylvania, and to be pushed back into Maryland. Washington, D.C., in Confederate hands since 1914, is still in their possession, but as their hold on Maryland weakens, the C.S. is faced with the possibility of losing the old U.S. capital as well.

Meanwhile, Flora Hamburger, a Socialist from New York, gains a nomination from her party, installing her as one of the first women in the House of Representatives in this alternate timeline.

Faced with a shortage of eligible white men, the Confederacy is forced to consider a bill that would allow blacks to serve in the C.S. Army, even though a number of them had rebelled against the same government that is now offering citizenship to volunteers.

The novel ends at the end of the 1916 presidential election where incumbent Democratic President Theodore Roosevelt and Vice President Walter McKenna are re-elected over Socialist Party candidate Eugene V. Debs by a wide margin with the U.S. Army moving further into Confederate territory.

== Reception ==
Publishers Weekly gave the book a positive review, stating that " the author emphasizes character, and his thorough knowledge of the period's history will, as usual, captivate his readers". SF Site also praised the book, saying that "Turtledove takes us to another world and plants us with all vividness among its ingeniously contrived unrealities".

Kirkus were critical of the book, saying it was "not so much alternate history as patriotic solipsism".
