= American Empire: Blood and Iron =

Book by Harry Turtledove

- First edition
- Author: Harry Turtledove
- Cover artist: Big Dot Designs
- Language: English
- Series: American Empire
- Genre: Alternate history novel
- Publication date: July 31, 2001
- Publication place: United States
- Media type: Print (Hardcover & Paperback)
- Pages: 512
- ISBN: 0-345-40565-X
- OCLC: 47647632
- Dewey Decimal: 813/.54 21
- LC Class: PS3570.U76 A8 2001
- Preceded by: The Great War: Breakthroughs
- Followed by: American Empire: The Center Cannot Hold

American Empire: Blood and Iron is the first book of the American Empire trilogy of alternate history fiction novels by Harry Turtledove. It is a sequel to the novel How Few Remain and the Great War trilogy, and is part of the Southern Victory series.

Blood and Iron covers events directly following the closing events of The Great War: Breakthroughs. It takes the TL-191 Earth from 1917 to 1924.

== Plot summary ==
The Great War is over, with the United States of America and its ally the German Empire having emerged the victors. After being beaten by the Confederate States of America in 1862 and in 1882, the United States has triumphed and avenged those humiliations which had so embittered it over the years. In the CSA, a former soldier named Jake Featherston joins the fascistic Freedom Party and uses it as his platform for beginning to take over the Confederate government and exact revenge on both the USA and the groups he perceives as having "stabbed the CSA in the back": Black Southerners, the Southern aristocracy, and the Whig Party. He soon takes over as leader of the Party and unleashes angry veterans on his enemies.

The USA's conservative government, meanwhile, and Democratic incumbent President Theodore Roosevelt, who was running for a third term, lost the 1920 Presidential Election. Replacing Roosevelt and his Vice President Walter McKenna is the party of the masses: the Socialist ticket of President Upton Sinclair and Vice President Hosea Blackford (who marries Congresswoman Flora Hamburger). Ignoring the looming threat of the south, the Socialists focus on improving the lives of its citizenry — at the cost of trimming down its defenses and the military. Sinclair is inaugurated president of the United States on March 4, 1921 to much rejoicing from the Socialist party.

Later in 1921, Jake Featherston runs for office against Wade Hampton V of the Whigs and Ainsworth Layne of the Radical Liberals. Featherston loses by a narrow margin to Hampton, but resolves to fight on. In June 1922, President Hampton is assassinated by Freedom party member Grady Calkins three months into his term. This leads to a massive decline in Freedom Party membership as members, friends and allies desert it amidst such a high-profile embarrassment. The assassination evokes rare sympathy from the United States, which ends the heavy burden of reparations payments placed on the CSA. This contributes greatly to the revival of the CSA's currency, which had suffered from crippling inflation since the conclusion of the Great War. Popular distrust in the Freedom Party and the newfound strength of Confederate paper money leads to support for the newly appointed Whig President Burton Mitchel. The United States' Socialists also have no better notion about what to do with the blacks in North America, and ignore the plight of those in the Confederacy.

In Canada, Governor-General George Custer rules the former Dominion with an iron-felt glove, surviving several assassination attempts by Manitoban farmer Arthur McGregor. Custer kills McGregor with a bomb in the farmer's final attempt as he is parading through Rosenfeld, Manitoba. At this point, the war hero is forced to retire by the new Socialist administration. Sinclair aims to return the U.S. to the days of peace, hoping that by treating its neighbors with respect there will never be another war. He is popular enough to win re-election in 1924 — the same year the Freedom Party begins to involve its stalwarts in the Mexican Civil War (compare to the real-world Spanish Civil War of 1936-39), an action where the U.S. supported the Republican rebels, but its meager support was limited, compared to the supplies, weapons, and barrels (tanks) that the Confederacy gives to Mexican Emperor Maximilian III.

== Literary significance and reception ==
Peter Canon in his review for Publishers Weekly said that "watching historical processes in action is the novel's real attraction. Knowing what happened in our timeline, readers will want to imagine the results of different choices." Don D'Ammassa writing for the Science Fiction Chronicle found this book more interesting than the last three because "Turtledove spends more time with his characters and with the motives behind the various developments rather than dwelling on the inevitable military encounters."
