= The Great War: Breakthroughs =

Book by Harry Turtledove

- First edition
- Author: Harry Turtledove
- Cover artist: George Pratt
- Language: English
- Series: Great War
- Genre: Alternate history novel
- Publisher: Del Rey Books
- Publication date: August 1, 2000
- Publication place: United States
- Media type: Print (Hardcover & Paperback)
- Pages: 496
- ISBN: 0-345-40563-3
- OCLC: 44039794
- Dewey Decimal: 813/.54 21
- LC Class: PS3570.U76 G743 2000
- Preceded by: The Great War: Walk in Hell
- Followed by: American Empire: Blood and Iron

The Great War: Breakthroughs is the third and final installment of the Great War trilogy in the Southern Victory series of alternate history novels by Harry Turtledove. It takes the Southern Victory Series to 1917.

== Plot summary ==
It's 1917, the Great War has proved very costly for both the United States and the Confederacy. After the seemingly endless stalemate that had been the first two years of war, the U.S. begin to slowly gain the upper hand, proving able to build and field armored forces more quickly and in greater numbers than the CSA. Their mobile "barrel" (tank) offensive proves decisive, as weak Confederate lines are unable to resist General George Armstrong Custer's advance towards Nashville, Tennessee. In the east, the U.S. are finally able to liberate Washington, D.C. from Confederate forces, though leveling most of the city in the process.

The war in Europe draws to a close, one year earlier than in our timeline as Russia is weakened by uprisings of servicemen and workers (leading to the abdication of Nicholas II as in our timeline, though Russian history diverges within the series after this point), French soldiers rise in mutiny (later leading to the overthrow of the Third French Republic and the establishment of a new monarchy under King Charles XI by 1930). The United Kingdom is cut off from important food shipments from Argentina after Brazil abandons the neutrality it had held since the beginning of the war and allies with Chile and Paraguay to attack Argentina.

By late July 1917, the CSA are in such dire condition that the country is forced to ask the USA for an armistice. The defeat is bitter and costly for the Confederates, as the United States forced punitive terms on the South, analogous to our history's Treaty of Versailles - which the USA considers long-overdue payback for its humiliation in the Second Mexican War, and in the War of Secession before that. Kentucky is readmitted into the US and Sequoyah (our Oklahoma) is put under occupation. Also, the western part of Texas becomes the new US state of Houston with its capital at Lubbock, a northeastern portion of Arkansas is annexed into Missouri, a part of northwestern Sonora is added to New Mexico (which also includes all of our Arizona), and all Virginian counties north of the Rappahannock River are annexed into West Virginia. The northern portion of Maine that the US lost to New Brunswick after the Second Mexican War is regained. Quebec becomes an independent nation and also becomes a US ally/puppet state, while the British Empire is forced to cede the rest of Canada and the Dominion of Newfoundland to the USA which are put under military occupation. The British Empire is also forced to surrender the Sandwich Islands (Hawaii), the Bahamas, and Bermuda to the US.

Germany wins the war in Europe, and Kaiser Wilhelm II's reign continues, as do the Ottoman and Austro-Hungarian Empires. Belgium remains occupied in peacetime for an extensive reconstruction, Alsace-Lorraine remains a German territory, and Britain is forced to recognize the Irish Republic including Northern Ireland, whose "Orange" Protestants periodically rebel against Irish rule.

Tsar Michael II does not refuse the crown as in our history, but with the war ended, rallies the monarchists to put down all rebellion, so the October Revolution never happens, and the Romanov dynasty continues. Poland and Ukraine are taken away from Russia and established as separate kingdoms under German influence, but Russia retains Finland as a province.

Italy has remained neutral through the entire war, and later volumes make clear that Benito Mussolini remains an obscure politician who never holds high office.

One Confederate submarine captain named Roger Kimball commits a war crime when he torpedoes and sinks a U.S. destroyer after the U.S.-C.S. armistice took effect, an incident soon to become notorious in postwar politics.

== Reception ==
Jackie Cassada in her review for Library Journal said "alternate history's grand master displays his acute knowledge of American history as well as his keen imagination as he paints a vivid portrait of a past that could have been." Publishers Weekly said "although a complete and skilfully executed tale in itself, this epic story leaves enough plot threads dangling to demand a fourth novel to tie them up." Don D'Ammassa reviewing for Science Fiction Chronicle said in this novel "the author concentrates more on fictional characters caught up in the conflict, and while it may not provide as many amusing alterations of historical fact, it makes for a much better story. Fans of alternate history, military SF, and riveting adventure fiction should all find this one entertaining."
