= The Probability Broach =

Science fiction novel by L. Neil Smith

- Cover of the first edition
- Author: L. Neil Smith
- Language: English
- Series: North American Confederacy
- Genre: Alternate history
- Published: 1980
- Publication place: United States
- Media type: Print (paperback)
- Followed by: The Venus Belt (by publication), The Nagasaki Vector (by chronology)

The Probability Broach is a 1980 science fiction novel by American writer L. Neil Smith.

It is set in an alternate history, the so-called "Gallatin Universe", where a libertarian society has formed on the North American continent, styled the North American Confederacy (NAC). This history was created when the Declaration of Independence has the word unanimous added to the preamble, to read that governments "derive their just power from the unanimous consent of the governed".

== Plot summary ==
Edward William "Win" Bear is an Ute Indian who works for the Denver Police Department in a version of the United States in an alternate history of 1987 that is controlled by an anti-capitalist, ecofascist government complete with a new police force created in 1984 called the Federal Security Police (FSP, or "SecPol" as it is more commonly known) reminiscent of the Gestapo. Henry M. Jackson is president, citizens' freedoms are very limited, and many laws and regulations have been passed. Examples include hoarding precious metals, such as silver and gold, is illegal and due to strict gun control policies, only the police and citizens with federal permits are allowed to carry guns.

Bear is called to investigate the unusual murder of physicist Vaughn Meiss; he eventually finds himself projected into the North American Confederacy by means of the "Probability Broach", an inter-dimensional conduit originally developed as a means for interstellar travel in the North American Confederacy by a bottlenose dolphin physicist, named Ooloorie Eckickeck P'Wheet, and her human compatriot, Dr. Dora Jayne Thorens.

Win encounters his NAC counterpart, Edward William "Ed" Bear, and Ed's neighbors, most notably the "healer" Clarissa Olson and Lucy Kropotkin, who is later revealed to be 135 years old. Lucy's life becomes the vantage point by which Win is acclimated to life in the NAC and Laporte, the NAC equivalent to Denver. Win and Ed unravel the mystery of the Meiss murder and learn that he was killed to hide an effort by SecPol to conquer the NAC with the help of Hamiltonian forces on the NAC side, led by John Jay Madison, a.k.a. the infamous Prussian expatriate and 1918 war hero Manfred von Richthofen, known here as the Red Knight of Prussia. Win, Ed, Lucy and Clarissa lead the effort to notify the nascent NAC government of the threat. En route to the meeting of the Continental Congress, Ed and Clarissa are kidnapped, leaving Win and Lucy to reveal the plot.

After fighting (and winning) a duel with a SecPol agent, Win and Lucy rescue their friends and track Madison and the Hamiltonians to a small town outside Laporte. Win sets off an explosion that eliminates all of the Hamiltonians.

Win elects to remain in the NAC and marries Clarissa. Ed marries Lucy, who at the time of the story is awaiting a delayed "regeneration" because of an accident involving massive radiation exposure, and they then set out for the Asteroid belt to build a new life for themselves on the NAC frontier.

The Continental Congress agrees to begin a massive propaganda campaign to force Win's United States (and the rest of the globe) toward a similar Gallatinist revolution.

== Reception ==
Greg Costikyan reviewed The Probability Broach in Ares Magazine #2 and commented that "The writing is less than sparkling, but serviceable. The Probability Broach is entertaining reading, but not recommended for socialists or others of delicate political sensibilities."

The Probability Broach won the 1982 Prometheus Award, which L. Neil Smith himself had created, and which is awarded by the Libertarian Futurist Society.
