= How Few Remain =

Book by Harry Turtledove

- Cover of first edition (hardcover)
- Author: Harry Turtledove
- Cover artist: C. Rochling
- Language: English
- Series: Southern Victory
- Genre: Alternate history
- Publisher: Ballantine Books/Del Rey
- Publication date: September 8, 1997
- Publication place: United States
- Media type: Print (Hardback & Paperback), eBook
- Pages: 594 (paperback)
- ISBN: 978-0-345-41661-2 (first edition, hardback), ISBN 9780307531018 (eBook)
- OCLC: 36798620
- Dewey Decimal: 813/.54 21
- LC Class: PS3570.U76 H69 1997
- Followed by: The Great War: American Front (Great War)

How Few Remain is a 1997 alternate history novel by Harry Turtledove. It is the first part of the Southern Victory saga, which depicts a world in which the Confederate States of America won the American Civil War. It is similar to his earlier novel The Guns of the South, but unlike the latter, it is a purely historical novel with no fantastical or science fiction elements. The book received the Sidewise Award for Alternate History in 1997, and was also nominated for the Nebula Award for Best Novel in 1998. It covers the Southern Victory Series period of history from 1862 and from 1881 to 1882.

== Plot ==
The point of divergence occurs on September 10, 1862, during the American Civil War. In actual history, a C.S. Army messenger lost a copy of General Robert E. Lee's Special Order 191, which detailed Lee's plans for an invasion of the North. The order was soon found by U.S. Army soldiers, and using them, George B. McClellan fought the Army of Northern Virginia at the Battle of South Mountain and eventually a draw at the Battle of Antietam and made it return to Virginia.

In How Few Remain, the orders are instead recovered by a trailing C.S. soldier. McClellan is caught by surprise, and Lee thus leads the Army of Northern Virginia towards Philadelphia. Lee forces McClellan into battle on the banks of the Susquehanna River in Pennsylvania and destroys the Army of the Potomac in the Battle of Camp Hill on October 1. Lee goes on to capture Philadelphia, earning the Confederate States of America diplomatic recognition from both the United Kingdom and France, thus winning the war, which is known as the War of Secession in the alternate timeline, and achieving independence from the United States on November 4, 1862.

Kentucky, having been conquered by C.S. forces shortly after the Battle of Camp Hill as a result of Lincoln diverting key troops there to Pennsylvania, who did not arrive in time to fight at Camp Hill, joins the eleven original C.S. states after the war's conclusion, and the Confederacy is also given the Indian Territory (our timeline's state of Oklahoma, later the State of Sequoyah in the SV timeline). However, as a compromise, the United States retains Missouri (despite proposals to divide it) and West Virginia. The Spanish island of Cuba is purchased by the C.S. in the late 1870s for $3,000,000, thus also becoming a C.S. state.

Abraham Lincoln ends up losing the 1864 presidential election to the Democratic candidate (whose identity is never mentioned in the series) in a landslide.

In the late 1860s, Russia offers to sell Alaska to the United States. However, the $7 million (~$144 million in 2025) price tag is too much for the U.S.'s eroded postwar economy which collapsed in 1863. Therefore, Alaska remains a Russian territory.

The C.S. makes agreeable treaties with the Indians in its domain, particularly those of the Indian Territory, ensuring their support for the new nation. The U.S. Army, freed up by the war's quick end, lets off steam by accelerating the U.S. settlement of the Great Plains and the West which also accelerated the Indian Wars, crushing all hostile tribes by the early 1870s except for the Comanche and Kiowa, who take full advantage of the new U.S.-C.S. border and manipulate the continuing hostility between the two nations to their own maximum benefit. One result is that the Battle of Little Big Horn (1876 in our timeline) never happens, a divergence that will have consequences resonating throughout the series.

In 1881, Republican James G. Blaine has ridden a hardline platform of anti-Confederatism into the White House, having defeated Democratic incumbent Samuel J. Tilden in the 1880 presidential election. Both American nations have been sanctioning Indian raids into each other's territory. The international tension between the United States and the Confederate States peaks when Confederate President James Longstreet, desiring a Pacific Coast for the Confederacy so that the South can have a transcontinental railroad for itself, purchases the northwestern provinces of Sonora and Chihuahua from the financially-strapped Second Mexican Empire, which is still ruled by Maximilian I, for CS $3,000,000. Blaine uses the "coerced" purchase as a casus belli, leading to the commencement of what will later become known as the "Second Mexican War".

=== Second Mexican War ===
After the Confederate purchase of Sonora and Chihuahua, which extends the border and gives the Confederates the Pacific port of Guaymas, the United States declares war on the Confederate States. Early on in the war, Confederate troops under Jeb Stuart capture a large quantity of gold and silver ore from a Union mining town after successfully occupying the newly purchased provinces. Meanwhile, a Union cavalry colonel, George Armstrong Custer, successfully uses Gatling guns against Kiowa Indians and Confederate cavalry in Kansas. Soon, the United Kingdom and France, both Confederate allies, blockade and bombard port cities such as Boston and New York, along with those on the Great Lakes.

During the war, the Mormons in Utah rebel by severing transcontinental communication and transportation around Salt Lake City. John Pope is appointed as the military governor, puts down the revolt, and imposes martial law. The Church of Jesus Christ of Latter-day Saints is classified as an illegal political organization, and Mormonism loses all protection under the First Amendment and is banned. The Mormon leaders are then hunted down and executed. The brutal put down of the revolt in Utah will set the stage for the Utah Troubles, which will haunt the United States for the rest of the series.

The U.S. attempt to invade Virginia is easily thrown back by General Stonewall Jackson as the Union struggles to find a general his equal. A key reason for the Confederate success in the war, in addition to fighting a defensive war, is that the Confederates are led by excellent generals like Jackson, but the U.S. military, despite possessing a massive advantage in numbers and resources, suffers from incompetent leadership. William Rosecrans, the commander of the entire U.S. army, casually reveals at one point that there is no overall strategy for winning the war "whatsoever." He envisions a vague idea of the opposing armies making counteroffensives back and forth against each other, which he feels the Union would assuredly win. That lack of planning leaves the German military observer, Alfred von Schlieffen, aghast.

The U.S. next attempts to launch a massive invasion of Louisville to knock the Confederates out of Kentucky, but that soon becomes a bloody stalemate. The decision of Stonewall Jackson to command the defense personally; the incompetence of U.S. commanders; and, most of all, the use of breech-loading artillery and repeating rifles make taking the city very difficult. The Confederate Army refrains from any major invasion of United States territory for two reasons: it does not have the resources to conquer the United States, and Confederate success hinges on the support of the United Kingdom and France, who feel that they are aiding a smaller nation wrongfully attacked by a larger one, and launching offensives into the United States would be seen as an act of aggression and might cost the Confederacy foreign support. Galled by orders to wage a purely defensive war, Jackson takes them to the extreme, pioneering tactics of urban warfare and full-scale trench warfare, which devastates Louisville (in scenes reminiscent of the real World War I). The Louisville campaign quickly bogs down for the United States and results in very heavy losses with little territory gained. The United Kingdom and France continue to blockade the United States; French forces from Mexico also shell Los Angeles, and the British bombard San Francisco and raid the Federal mint there.

The only major U.S. victory in the war occurs by a young volunteer cavalry colonel, Theodore Roosevelt, and George Armstrong Custer routing a British and Canadian division under Charles Gordon invading Montana from Canada. However, the British also invade northern Maine and annex it into the Canadian province of New Brunswick, which nullifies the Webster–Ashburton Treaty, which had solved the dispute.

Finally, facing defeat on almost all fronts, President Blaine is forced to capitulate on April 22, 1882. He declares that the anniversary of the defeat would be commemorated as Remembrance Day. A Republican is never again elected to the US presidency, with the party splitting into one faction led by Abraham Lincoln, which later becomes the Socialist Party, and another led by Benjamin Butler, which joins the Democrats; the Republicans become an ineffectual centrist third party. The United States, learning the importance of strong allies, seek an alliance with the newly formed and powerful German Empire, and swear revenge against the Confederacy for the humiliating defeat. The alliance sets up events for the next three series, which cover an alternate World War I, Interwar Period, and World War II.

== Primary characters ==
The novel is narrated from the point of view of eight primary historical figures.

- Thomas J. Jackson, old "Stonewall," General-in-Chief of the Confederate army, is ready and eager to strike at the Yankees once more. He fights battles in West Virginia before inventing Urban Warfare in the Battle of Louisville. Later he is approached by Wade Hampton III in a coup attempt but refuses.
- General J.E.B. Stuart defends the new C.S. territories of Sonora and Chihuahua from the Yankees in the New Mexico Territory, the Apaches under Geronimo being first his allies and then his foes. He dies in an Apache ambush near the end of the book.
- Colonel George Armstrong Custer, a frustrated U.S. cavalryman, serves on the Great Plains, border between Kansas and the Indian Territory and helps brutally put down the Mormon rebellion in Utah. He then heads north to Montana and wins a great victory against British general Chinese Gordon, before planning a run for president.
- Theodore Roosevelt is a wealthy, patriotic young Montana rancher who raises his own cavalry force, known as the "Unauthorized Regiment". He is largely responsible for Custer's victory in Montana.
- Frederick Douglass, a former slave and a fiery orator and journalist, observes the Union forces at war in Louisville and New York. He is briefly captured by the Confederates but is released by order of President Longstreet.
- Colonel Alfred von Schlieffen serves as the German military attaché to the U.S. He helps to plan the German-U.S. alliance.
- Samuel Clemens is a sharp-witted newspaper editor in San Francisco and a prominent opponent of the war.
- Former President Abraham Lincoln, influenced by the writings of Karl Marx and Friedrich Engels, is an orator struggling to keep the Republican Party united in the cause of the working man, but eventually helps form a new party, the Socialists, which effectively replaces the Republican Party in the coming decades.

== Aftermath of war ==
In April 1882, the Confederates once again defeat the United States, which allows the purchase of Sonora and Chihuahua to stand. Along with losing the war, the United States loses in a war against the United Kingdom, ceding the northern part of Maine to the Canadian province of New Brunswick.

Following a series of speeches in Utah and Montana, and a gathering of Republicans at the Florence Hotel in Chicago, Illinois, former president Abraham Lincoln leads a group of left-wing Republicans into the new Socialist Party, an action that leads to the sharp decline of the Republican Party, allowing the Socialists to eventually become the primary opposition to the Democrats. As a result, the Republicans fade into a minor third party representing only the Midwest, which is booming in the late 19th and the early 20th centuries. Meanwhile, the Democrats are driven to the right by Benjamin Butler, who leads the right-wing Republicans to merge with the party and causes a majority of the party to adopt a hard line foreign policy and the gearing of American society to nationalism and revanchism.

After the U.S. defeat in the Second Mexican War, President Blaine declares April 22 of every succeeding year to be Remembrance Day to remember the humiliation of defeat and to vow revenge. The holiday parades will be somber, with the U.S. flag being flown upside down as a sign of distress, signifying the two defeats by the Confederate States. As a result of the U.S. defeat in the Second Mexican War, Blaine loses the 1884 presidential election to an unknown Democratic candidate in a landslide and becomes the last Republican to hold the office of the presidency.

In effect, he concedes defeat in this war but sets the stage for the next one by instilling in U.S. citizens an ever-present desire for and expectation of revenge upon the Confederacy and the British Empire and embarking on an intensive program of systematic militarization on the German model, with the vision of making the United States a kind of second Prussia.

In this timeline's New York City, there is no Statue of Liberty on Bedloe's Island, and its name does not get changed to Liberty Island since relations between the United States and France are poor because of France's support for the Confederacy, and there is no question of the French donating such a statue to the Americans. Instead, the island is taken up by a similar but grimmer German-influenced statue, known as the Statue of Remembrance holding the "Sword of Vengeance." Whether Germany gave the statue to the United States or the latter built it itself is never mentioned.

Meanwhile, the United States will move centers of administration from Washington, DC, to Philadelphia because the District of Columbia bordering the Confederate State of Virginia, which makes governing increasingly difficult and impractical for the United States. The Powel House becomes a secondary White House whenever tensions between both countries are high.

To continue to receive assistance from the United Kingdom and France, Confederate President Longstreet had to propose a constitutional amendment calling for the manumission of all country's slaves and making them resident aliens, but the free blacks do not have the same rights as whites, setting up an important conflict for succeeding volumes of the series.

After losing two wars within twenty years, the U.S. begins an alliance with the strengthening German Empire (formed in 1871), and it eventually starts to reform itself along Prussian lines.

== Reception ==
The book received a starred review from Publishers Weekly. SF Site's review stated, "Alternate history runs the risk of sliding into propaganda, suggesting that an outcome which could have happened is one which should have. This book has a whiff of that," but goes on to say, "Turtledove has researched the case thoroughly and argues it well."

== Southern Victory Series continued ==
How Few Remain is followed in the Southern Victory series by the Great War and American Empire trilogies, and the Settling Accounts tetralogy.
