= List of fictional presidents of the United States (K–M) =

Lists of fictional presidents of the United States
A–B	C–D	E–F
G–H	I–J	K–M
N–R	S–T	U–Z
Fictional presidencies of historical figures
A–B	C–D	E–G
H–J	K–L	M–O
P–R	S–U	V–Z

The following is a list of fictional presidents of the United States, K through M.

== K ==
=== President David Arnold Dieter "Dad" Kampferhaufe ===
- President in: Death of a Politician by Richard Condon (1978 novel)
- Former World War Two general
- Vice president was Walter Bodmor Slurrie.
- Party: Republican

=== President Charles Foster Kane ===
- President in: Back in the USSA by Eugene Byrne and Kim Newman.
- Kane is Theodore Roosevelt's running mate in 1912. They are elected over Republican incumbent William Howard Taft and Democratic candidate Woodrow Wilson. However, on December 19, 1912, Roosevelt is assassinated at the Union Stockyards in Chicago, Illinois by Annie Oakley when personally breaking a labor strike with the help of the Rough Riders. With this being less than three months before the inauguration, Kane is inaugurated as the 28th president on March 4, 1913, as a result.
- He brings the US into World War I after the RMS Titanic sinks on October 9, 1914.
- Reelected in 1916 over Taft and Wilson (who is assassinated in February 1917, possibly by Kane's agents).
- Kane's policies cause great unrest and he is overthrown and executed by a communist revolution.
- Serves as the analog to Russian Tzar Nicholas II.
- Party: Progressive

=== President Florentyna Kane ===
- President in: The Prodigal Daughter and Shall We Tell the President?
- Kane (née Rosnovski) becomes the first woman president after her predecessor dies of a heart attack while jogging.
- Party: Democratic

=== President Rufus Kane ===
- President in: The Life of Mary Marlin (1930s radio show)
- Asks Iowa Senator Mary Marlin to marry him

=== President Kang ===
- President in: "Treehouse of Horror VII" (The Simpsons)
- Kang is elected president in 1996 after he and his companion Kodos capture and impersonate presidential candidates Bill Clinton and Bob Dole when informed by Homer Simpson of that year's presidential election.
- After accidentally ejecting both the real Clinton and Dole into deep space while trying to rescue them, Homer exposes the two aliens to the world. However, Kang and Kodos declare that the two-party system meant that the people still have to vote for one of them, scoffing at one bystander's suggestion of voting for a third-party candidate instead (much to Ross Perot's chagrin).
- Shortly after his election, Kang enslaves the population of the United States and orders the construction of a death ray to be aimed at a planet that "nobody's ever heard of".
- Played by: Harry Shearer (voice)
- Party: Republican.

=== President Roberto Katze ===
- President in: Toaru Majutsu no Index by Kazuma Kamachi
- He is the third Hispanic President.
- Party: Unknown

=== President Ed Kealty ===
- President in: The Teeth of the Tiger by Tom Clancy
- Ed Kealty took over the presidency after President Robby Jackson was assassinated. Kealty previously failed to secure the presidency when he tried to say he never officially resigned after the events of Debt of Honor's final pages.
- Party: Democratic

=== President Elizabeth Keane ===
- President-elect, later president in: Homeland
- First female to be elected president, replacing President Morse.
- Native of Lake Placid and former junior senator from New York.
- Divorced from Aaron Keane, an anthropologist.
- Votes in favor of the Iraq War, but later develops anti-war sentiments after her son Andrew Keane died during the conflict.
- Runs for president in 2016. She nominated her former primary challenger Ralph Warner as her running mate, who later becomes her vice president.
- Evacuated to a safehouse after a terrorist attack in Midtown Manhattan takes place near her transition offices, but later returns against the advice of the Secret Service.
- Survives two assassination attempts orchestrated by rogue elements of the US government, the United States Army and the United States Intelligence Community. She is subjected to a smear campaign intended to discredit her before her inauguration or to force her resignation, with rogue intelligence officers and conservative talk-show host Brett O'Keefe spreading misinformation via bots that Andrew Keane died while deserting (instead of trying to save his wounded comrades). As a result of the attempts on her life, Keane becomes the first president to be inaugurated behind closed doors.
- She later develops severe paranoia as a result of the attempts on her life, which culminates in her administration extending the PATRIOT Act and using the new provisions to carry out a mass arrest of government and intelligence officials she suspected conspired against her, detaining many without probable cause. This move causes her administration to be investigated by Arizona Senator Sam Paley, who desires to appoint a special prosecutor with regard to her actions.
- She personally advocates that General Jamie McClendon, one of the main conspirators in her assassination attempt, should be given the death penalty during his court martial, and is infuriated upon hearing he is only given life imprisonment.
- Keane orders O'Keefe's arrest, but he flees, continuing to broadcast his talk show whilst on the run. The manhunt ends in O'Keefe's arrest following a deadly shootout between the FBI and a family of anti-Keane O'Keefe fans in backwoods Virginia.
- Her administration is later targeted by information warfare masterminded by the Russian government and the GRU in an attempt to trigger a constitutional crisis and to discredit and remove her from office. This campaign implicates her White House Chief of Staff David Wellington in the death of General McClendon, and leverages the Paley investigation by feeding him false information, and by manipulating Carrie Mathison, aggrieved by Keane's actions against the Intelligence Community, into presenting a fabricated link between Wellington and McClendon's death.
- Machinations by Paley and Warner result in them attempting to get the Cabinet of the United States to invoke the 25th Amendment to remove Keane from office, arguing that her poor management shows she is unable to discharge the duties of the office. Keane attempts to circumvent this by firing certain members of the cabinet, but the Supreme Court of the United States rules that the method she employed to fire them was unlawful, and that they can remain. The 25th Amendment is officially invoked: Keane is removed and Warner takes over.
- She is reinstated after testimony to the Senate Intelligence Committee by Russian agent Simone Martin absolves Keane of any wrongdoing, and fully reveals the extent of the Russian interference in her administration. However, knowing that her reputation has been tainted in the public eye and that the American people need a leader they can trust to save American democracy, she resigns in favor of Warner.
- Secret Service codename: Big Apple
- Political Party: Implied to be Democratic
- Played by: Elizabeth Marvel

=== President Matthew Keating ===
- President in: The Presidents Daughter by Bill Clinton and James Patterson
- A former Navy SEAL who was medically discharged after surviving a helicopter crash in Afghanistan that shattered his hip.
- After leaving the service, he was elected to the United States House of Representatives for Texas's 7th district, where he served on the House Financial Services Committee.
- Became the running mate to Senator Martin Lovering on his presidential campaign, which divided the Party.
- Became the president after President Lovering's death of an aortic aneurysm.
- Served less than a full term; became the first president in American history to be defeated in the primary by his own vice president, Pamela Barnes.
- Married to Professor (Dr.) Samantha Keating, an archaeologist by trade; together, they have a daughter, Melanie R. "Mel" Keating, who was a teenager during her father's presidential term.
- Inherited from President Lovering his Chief of Staff Jack Lyon, Chairman of the Joint Chiefs of Staff Admiral Horace McCoy, National Security Advisor Sandra Powell, and Secretary of Defense Pridham Collum; later nominated and appointed, among others, retired Army Brigadier General Sarah Palumbo the Deputy National Security Advisor for the National Security Council, Lisa Blair as the Director of the FBI, and Kimberly Bouchard as Secretary of the Air Force.
- After the completion of his term, retired to New Hampshire where he is assisted by his Chief of Staff Madeline Perry and the Special Agent-in-Charge of his Secret Service detail David Stahl.
- Plans to run against incumbent President Pamela Barnes in the next Presidential Primary Election.

=== President John Keeler ===
- 45th President in: 24
- Played by: Geoffrey Pierson
- 2005–2006
- Keeler is elected after President David Palmer withdrew from the race. As part of a day of unprecedented terrorist strikes, Air Force One is shot down, critically injuring Keeler and killing dozens of others including the president's son, Kevin; Vice President Charles Logan becomes acting president. His fate is never revealed, though Logan becomes president (no longer acting) 18 months later, likely indicating that Keeler died from his injuries.
- Previously served as a United States senator from Minnesota, Minnesota Secretary of State, and in the U.S. Army Reserve
- Party: Republican
- Buried at Lakewood Cemetery in Minneapolis, Minnesota.

=== President Tim Kegan ===
- President in: Winter Kills, book by Richard Condon and film
- Assassinated president who is never fully seen during one flashback scene in movie.

=== President Keith ===
- President in: "A Sound of Thunder" by Ray Bradbury
- Recently elected at story's opening.

=== President Kellogg ===
- President in Man of the Year
- Incumbent Democrat up for reelection
- Due to faulty electronic voting equipment produced by the computer company Delacroy, it is believed that he lost the election to Independent candidate and former news satirist Tom Dobbs.
- However, after being contacted by discredited ex-Delacroy employee Eleanor Green, Dobbs reveals the truth about Delacroy's voting technology, the attempted cover-up and his desire to return to satire on an episode of Saturday Night Live, with Kellogg being re-elected in a special do-over election. His second term was described as being "not great, but better".

=== President Joshua Francis Kellogg ===
- President in: Joshua Son of None, by Nancy Freedman
- Cloned from tissue taken from an unnamed president (strongly implied to be John F. Kennedy) shortly after his 1963 assassination, and deliberately raised so as to mimic President Kennedy's early life, in hopes of "re-creating" the original through similar formative experiences.
- Assassinated immediately after inauguration
- Cells taken from his body in order to make yet another clone.

=== President Robert Kempers ===
- President in: Quarantine (2000)
- President when terrorists unleash a genetically modified virus
- Gives the order to shoot down a passenger jet loaded with potentially sick children after it violates quarantine, but then rescinds it moments before the strike.

=== President Kendrick ===
- President in: Secret Justice by James W. Huston

=== President Francis Xavier Kennedy ===
- President in: Mario Puzo's The Fourth K
- Nephew of John F. Kennedy who served one term in the Senate. His first act as president is to donate his $40 million fortune to relieve the national debt.
- During his administration, the Pope is executed, his daughter kidnapped, and a bomb detonated in Manhattan. In retaliation, President Kennedy destroys the capital city of Dach in the fictional Arabian country of Sherbin. Kennedy is later reelected after an assassination attempt.
- President Kennedy is assassinated on Inauguration Day by a member of the same terrorist group that killed the Pope.

=== President Clark Kent ===
- President in: Action Comics Annual #3 (1991)
- Pete Ross is running for president with Kent as his campaign manager. When an assassination attempt results in Ross' injury and reveals Kent's secret identity, Ross insists Superman take his place as the Democratic nominee.
- President Kent is responsible for a series of satellites broadcasting solar power to Earth. He also worked towards multilateral disarmament, and the coalition of all superhero teams into the World Peace League.
- This future was observed by the time traveller Waverider, but negated soon afterwards.
- Party: Democratic

=== President Raine Kent ===
- President in: Rejoice, A Knife to the heart by Steven Erikson
- Kent serves his term when an alien intervention delegation is trying to save Earth from human destruction by ripping humanity away from its free will through artificial intelligence
- Portrayed as loud, brash, and aggressive

=== President Rose Sweeney Keogh ===
- President in: The Very First Lady by Steve Dunleavy
- Wife of the 1984 Republican nominee, Boston newspaper publisher Sean Keogh, she replaces him as the nominee when he is incapacitated.
- Suffers from dissociative identity disorder.
- Party: Republican

=== President Kerlog ===
- President in: The Black President
- 87th president in 2228

=== President Larry Kerr ===
- President in Pine Gap
- While he is attending a APEC conference in Sittwe, Myanmar, the Pine Gap satellite surveillance base in Northern Territory, Australia detects a missile in range, so he has to be evacuated
- later, an audio tape of him viciously insulting the Australian Prime Minister Phillip Burke is leaked, damaging U.S.-Australian relations
- he has to face an active military conflict in the South China Sea after the Chinese army shot down a US fighter jet
- played by Rob McPherson

=== President Daniel Ki ===
- President in American War (novel)
- Championed the Sustainable Future Act, outlawing fossil fuels.
- Assassinated in December 2073 in Jackson, Mississippi by a secessionist suicide bomber disguised as a pregnant woman.
- The last president prior to, and whose assassination was the catalyst for, the outbreak of the Second American Civil War (2074–2095).

=== President Donald Kilbourne ===
- President in: Larry Burkett's The Illuminati
- Discredited for mishandling of west-coast earthquake/tsunami disaster. Withdrew candidacy.
- Party: Democratic

=== President Kerry Francis Kilcannon ===
- President in: Richard North Patterson's novels Protect and Defend and Balance of Power, candidate in No Safe Place.
- Kilcannon is a New Jersey Democrat. Elected in 2000 at age 42 after defeating incumbent Vice-president Dick Mason. Appointed Caroline Masters as the first female Chief Justice.
- Kilcannon was a two-term senator and succeeded his older brother James, who was assassinated while running for president in 1988.
- Party: Democratic

=== President Zebediah Killgrave ===
- President in: Marvel 1602
- A variant of the Marvel supervillain Purple Man from Earth-460.
- Becomes president for life in the 21st century which leads to Captain America traveling back in time to the Elizabethan Era.

=== President Tom Kimball ===
- President in: Captain America
- Played by: Ronny Cox
- Vietnam War hero. A year into his first term, he pushes for aggressive new pro-environmental legislation that angers the military-industrial complex, who hold a secret conference in Italy led by the Red Skull. The president is kidnapped and held at the Red Skull's Italian castle, but is saved by Captain America, Kimball's childhood hero. Eventually, Kimball's environmental pact is passed.

=== President Paul Kincaid ===
- President in: Hostages
- Married to First Lady Mary Kincaid.
- Raped a news reporter when he was campaigning for congress in 1978.
- Later attempted to have his resulting illegitimate daughter, Nina, killed, to hide the rape story.
- Suffers from a minor heart condition, with planned surgery at the start of the series.
- Becomes target for assassination by multiple people with different agendas throughout the series. Rogue FBI agent Duncan Carlisle wants him killed so his bone marrow can be harvested and used in an experimental cancer treatment to save his wife; the president's illegitimate daughter. To kill him, Carlisle attempts to blackmail the president's surgeon, Dr. Ellen Sanders, into sabotaging the operation. Colonel Thomas Blair, the corrupt Director of the National Security Agency, also wants the president killed, because he refuses to support a new mass surveillance program.
- Survives an assassination attempt during a visit to New York to address the United Nations.
- Survives the surgery performed on him by Dr. Sanders, but she removes a sample of bone marrow in the process so that Nina can be saved.
- Details of the rape, attempted cover-up and attempted murder are revealed to the First Lady by Carlisle and Sanders, who subsequently informs her husband that she intends to go public with them.
- Portrayed by James Naughton

=== President Roderick Kinnison ===
- In First Lensman, Volume Two of the Lensman series by E.E. Smith, protagonists Roderick Kinnison (a member of the Galactic Patrol) wins election as President of North America on the "Cosmocratic Party" ticket against the corrupt Witherspoon, who ran on the "Nationalist Party" ticket. North America still uses the electoral college system. The president has a five-year term. The novel takes place several hundred years in the future after Earth has recovered from the late 20th-century World War III.

=== President Zachary King ===
- President in Kingdom Come by Elliot S. Magin
- Two-term president

=== President Robert Kinsey ===
- President in: Stargate SG-1 TV-series
- A senator from Indiana, Kinsey was vice president under President Henry Hayes. Kinsey became president in two separate alternate timelines. He is tied to a group called the Trust, a cabal of international businessmen who are trying to obtain alien technologies for commercial purposes, largely by using Kinsey's power and influence. At the end of Season 7, President Hayes forces him into retirement.
- Played by: Ronny Cox

=== Acting President Elizabeth Kirk ===
- Acting President in Heads of State.
- Served as Vice President under President William Derringer.
- Prior to being selected as Derringers running mate and ultimately Vice President, she campaigned against him as a more experienced politician in the primaries under an "America First" message.
- After President Derringer is presumed dead when Air Force One is shot down over Belarus by terrorists working for Russian arms dealer Viktor Gradov, Kirk is sworn in as Acting President pursuant to the 25th Amendment whilst attending a NATO conference in Trieste.
- Has to navigate the potential disbandment of NATO, after Gradov accesses Echelon, a top secret NSA surveillance program, and leaks classified documents showing member states carried out espionage against each other. Gradov intends to destabilise the alliance after they sanctioned the killing of his son, a nuclear energy scientist, and later stole his proprietary technology for their own uses.
- Kirk is later revealed to be directly involved in the conspiracy, framing White House Staff Simone Bradshaw for her actions and ordering corrupt United States Secret Service agents to kill President Derringer upon discovering he is alive. When this fails, she ultimately confesses her reasons for wanting to forcibly disband NATO is due to the disproportionate funding provided by the United States.
- Is shot and killed by Gradov, whose operatives attack the summit and engage in a firefight with the Italian Army and various member state security teams. Ultimately re-succeeded by President Derringer after her death and revelation to the world that he survived the terrorist attack on Air Force One.
- Played by: Carla Gugino
- Political Party: Unspecified (implied to be Republican)

=== President Thomas Adam "Tom" Kirkman ===
- President in: Designated Survivor
- Born on December 9, 1967, in Port Washington, New York.
- Served in the Peace Corps.
- Attended Cornell University, and worked as an urban planner, architect, and college professor until his appointment to the Richmond Administration.
- Secretary of Housing and Urban Development during the first term of President Robert Richmond.
- Asked to resign by White House Chief of Staff Charlie Langdon due to disagreements regarding housing policy, but was offered the position of Ambassador to the International Civil Aviation Organization as incentive to leave the administration.
- Chosen as the designated survivor during a State of the Union address.
- Ascends to the presidency after a bombing of the United States Capitol during the State of the Union address kills Richmond and the rest of the presidential line of succession, along with most of Congress and multiple members of the Joint Chiefs of Staff.
- Has James Royce, the governor of Michigan, arrested for treason after he conspires with the Michigan State Police and Michigan Army National Guard to undermine Kirkman's authority and commit civil rights violations towards the Muslim population of Dearborn in wake of the Capitol Bombing.
- Temporarily suspends all immigration into the United States under pressure from the majority of state governors in exchange for emergency elections to be permitted to form a new Congress.
- Nominates Congressman Peter MacLeish, the only survivor of the Capitol Bombing, to become his vice president. MacLeish subsequently conspires to have Kirkman assassinated at his swearing in ceremony, in which Kirkman was non-fatally shot in the chest, and recovered after brief heart surgery. MacLeish is later killed by his own wife to avoid being captured by the FBI, and Kirkman spends the next several months without a vice president, until he appoints Mayor of the District of Columbia Ellenor Darby, who impresses him with her response to a blackout in the capital caused by a cyber attack, as a replacement.
- Married to Alex Kirkman, an attorney with the EEOC. She is killed in a traffic collision in season 2, sending Kirkman into a depression that inhibits his leadership, which leads to his Cabinet considering the invocation of the 25th Amendment to remove him from office, until he manages to prove before a committee hearing that he is still fit for service.
- Orders military strikes on the fictional Middle Eastern nation of Kunami when he believes them responsible for a dirty bomb attack on a D.C. subway station. He eventually ceases hostilities after learning that the attack was actually carried out by rebel forces seeking to trick America into overthrowing the Kunami emir, but by the time this happens a group of Navy SEALs uncovers an illegal stash of chemical weapons, which Kirkman uses as leverage to force the emir to step down anyway.
- Eventually runs for a full term in office and ultimately wins reelection
- Commissions the rebuilding of the U.S. Capitol Building
- Has two children, Penny and Leo Kirkman.
- Secret Service codename: Phoenix.
- Political party: Independent (but served in a Democratic administration).
- Played by: Kiefer Sutherland

=== President Benjamin Knight ===
- President in The Lucky Ones by Doris Mortman
- Party: Democratic

=== President Leslie Knope ===
- Possible President in: Parks and Recreation
- Former two-term Governor of Indiana
- Married to Congressman/Possible PresidentBen Wyatt
- Party: Democratic
- Serie co-creator Michael Schur has stated it was meant to be ambiguous whether it was Leslie or Ben who is president in the last episode

=== President George W. Knox ===
- President in: GURPS Alternate Earths
- Elected in 1980 as the first African-American president.
- President in a world where the Confederate States of America survived the Civil War
- Party: Republican

=== President Orrin Knox ===
- President in: The Promise of Joy by Allen Drury
- Early in his presidency, a limited nuclear war breaks out between the U.S.S.R. and the People's Republic of China. President Knox mediates the conflict.

=== President Henry Kolladner ===
- President in: Moonfall by Jack McDevitt
- The nation's second African-American president.
- He dies because the helicopter where he was traveling was struck by lightning.
- Elected president in 2020.
- Party: Democratic

=== President David Kovic ===
- President in: movie Dave
- Stand-in for the ailing real President William Harrison Mitchell.
- Played by: Kevin Kline

=== President Russell P. Kramer ===
- President in My Fellow Americans
- Born in Ohio, Kramer was a congressman and a senator who loses reelection as president; according to Kramer, eighty million people voted against him. Famous for line "Our dreams are like our children." Later ran again for office as an independent with former President Matt Douglas.
- Played by: Jack Lemmon
- Party: Independent, formerly Republican

=== President Elizabeth Kress ===
- President in table-top RPG Cyberpunk, also mentioned in Cyberpunk 2077: Phantom Liberty.
- Born in a United States Air Force hospital in the Okinawa Prefecture in 1978. Former Air Force colonel.
- Went deaf after a European Economic Community bombing of Colorado Springs and left the Air Force after receiving an audio implant. Went on to become CEO of Militech, an American defense company.
- Became acting president in 2018 after death of president Blair. Elected and sworn in as president in 2021.
- Nationalized Militech during Fourth Corporate War.
- Ordered the nuking of Arasaka Tower, killing roughly 750,000 people in the process and ending the war. Put blame on the Arasaka Corporation and revoked their right to operate in the United States.
- President until 2053, when a new constitution was ratified.
- Political party: Federalist (possibly merger of Democratic and Republican parties)

=== President Hayward Kretz ===
- President in: The Senator (1968) and The President (1970) by Drew Pearson

== L ==
=== President Charles W. La Follette ===
- President in: Settling Accounts: Return Engagement through Settling Accounts: In at the Death in the Southern Victory Series by Harry Turtledove.
- Vice president from 1937 who is sworn in as president in 1942 after incumbent Al Smith is killed in a Confederate bombing raid on the U.S. capital of Philadelphia during the Second Great War.
- Despite leading the United States to victory in the Second Great War and dissolving the Confederacy, he loses the 1944 election to Democratic candidate Thomas E. Dewey and his running mate Harry S. Truman, as most of the electorate blames the Socialists for the outbreak of the war due to Smith's policy of appeasement towards Confederate President Jake Featherston.
- Turtledove himself mentioned that Charles W. La Follette is the fictionalized son of real life Wisconsin Senator Robert M. La Follette and is based on his son Robert "Young Bob" La Follette.
- Political party: Socialist

=== President Aaron Lake ===
- President in: The Brethren
- An obscure, strongly pro-defense expenditure congressman from Arizona, Lake is selected by Teddy Maynard, the director of the CIA, who prepares an elaborate scheme to control the United States presidential election. Maynard is worried about an emerging strongman who is about to take over Russia that also plans to restart the Cold War. To prepare the US for that confrontation, Lake, prompted by Maynard, declares a surprise candidature on a single issue: he vows to double defense spending. Maynard acquires enormous campaign donations from defense industries for Lake, completely controls his campaign, and colludes in the bombing of the U.S. Embassy in Cairo to highlight Lake's message. A hitch develops when Lake's secret gay inclinations make him vulnerable to blackmail, but the CIA defuses the threat by resorting to murder. Lake wins after the CIA orchestrates a nuclear crisis on the eve of the elections to make Lake seem "a messiah". Lake is completely controlled by Maynard, who even selects for him a suitable First Lady and instructs Lake on when he should impregnate her.
- Party: Republican

=== President Gordon James Landers ===
- President in: A More Perfect Union by Robert Stapp (1970 novel)
- Former governor of Illinois
- Elected in 1976
- In an alternate timeline where Lincoln did not oppose the Secession of the Southern States, Landers sends State Department Agent Cordell Vance to assassinate the Confederate President to prevent the C.S.A. from starting a nuclear war.

=== President Hank Landry ===
- President in: episode "The Road Not Taken" (Stargate SG-1)
- Landry is the president in an alternate universe, who reveals the existence of the Stargate to the world and is forced to declare martial law and cancel all elections.
- Played by: Beau Bridges

=== President Elizabeth Lanford ===
- President in: Independence Day: Resurgence
- Vice president of the United States under Lucas Jacobs (2004–2012)
- Elected in 2012 as the first female president
- Encounters another alien invasion in 2016, and is killed by them with the entirety of the United States presidential line of succession at Cheyenne Mountain Complex
- Succeeded by Joshua Adams, commanding general of Earth Space Defense
- Played by: Sela Ward

=== President Booker T. Langford ===
- President in: Down to a Sunless Sea
- First African-American president who has to consider whether or not to let five Southern majority African-American states secede from the United States.
- Presides over a U.S. devastated by collapse of the dollar, near end of American domestic oil production, and the severe curtailment of oil imports to the United States
- Calls for peace and time to prove that the United States did not produce the nuclear weapons Israel used to attack Syria, Jordan, and Egypt, after Tel Aviv's water supply is contaminated with BW agents.
- Either killed or out of contact during the surprise Sino-Soviet nuclear attack on America and replaced by James McCracken, acting president, who, from an undisclosed location (probably a bunker, Raven's Rock, Mount Weather, or the like) launches retaliatory strikes against the USSR and mainland China.

=== President Teddy Langford ===
- President in: The Man with the President's Mind by Ted Allbeury (1977 novel)
- Has to deal with a completely unprecedented Cold War threat: Andrei Levin, a Moscow psychiatrist, has the American president's mind, down to the last psychological detail. He can tell the Soviet rulers with complete accuracy what Langford is thinking and how he would react in every situation.

=== President Langley ===
- President in: "Bookworm, Run" by Vernor Vinge (1965 short story; anthologized in The Complete Stories of Vernor Vinge, 2001)

=== Acting President Sally Langston ===
- President in: Scandal
- Party: Republican (Tea Party)
- The vice president and former primary challenger to Fitzgerald Thomas Grant III, she assumed office under the Twenty-fifth Amendment after an assassination attempt on Grant leaves him in critical condition. Her acting presidency ended after receiving a letter ending invocation; Grant's signature on the letter was forged by First Lady Melody Grant, as he is still comatose. Langston's attempt to refute the authenticity of the letter was undermined by Grant's sudden arrival back at the White House in good health.
- She attempted to run for president in 2012 as an Independent in opposition to Grant whilst still serving as his vice president, a course of action not taken since the ratification of the Twelfth Amendment. Despite having strong anti-abortion views, Langston adopted a softer, vaguer stance on the subject. While it seemed that she would win the election in the last days of campaigning, Grant ultimately defeated her due to public sympathy following the death of his son, Fitzgerald Thomas Grant IV (which was orchestrated by the secret CIA black-ops group, B6-13).
- Following her election defeat, she became the host of the conservative talk show The Liberty Report, boasting that she had more influence over the American electorate than she ever did as vice president.
- She was married to Daniel Langston whom she murdered after he had an affair with James Novak (the husband of White House Chief of Staff Cyrus Beene) and threatened to come out of the closet. She also has a daughter who had an abortion at age fourteen, a fact that had been used to blackmail her into supporting Grant when he risked impeachment due to an affair he had with aide Amanda Tanner.
- Played by Kate Burton

=== President (Helen) Lasker ===
- President in: Contact by Carl Sagan (1985 novel)
- A two-term (1993–2001) female president who deals with the ramifications of alien contact. In the film adaptation, she is replaced by Bill Clinton, from authentic and slightly "doctored" archive footage of press conferences, meetings and TV appearances edited in such a way as to present fictional events.

=== President Owen Lassiter ===
- President in: The West Wing
- Mentioned only in one episode, Lassiter was a native of California, has a presidential library, was married and is deceased.
- In his Oval Office, President Lassiter had jars of sand and soil from land wherever American soldiers died. In the twilight of his life, he wrote an essay titled "The Need for an American Empire" to President Bartlet calling for opposition of Islamic fundamentalism.
- Party: Republican

=== President Paul James Latimer ===
- President in: Panorama Mundial (1984 WIPR-TV futurist documentary)
- Elected 1996 or 2000
- Admits Puerto Rico and United States Virgin Islands into the United States as the 51st and 52nd states in 2002

=== President Jason Law ===
- President in: Rubicon One by Dennis Jones (1980s novel).
- Orders U.S. naval aircraft to intercept an Israeli Air Force strike to prevent World War III

=== President Joe Lawton ===
- President in: Grand Theft Auto IV

=== President Leary ===
- President in: Call of Duty: Black Ops III
- President during a Third Cold War

=== President Lenny Leonard ===
- President in: "The Wizard of Evergreen Terrace" (The Simpsons)
- After Homer experiences a mid-life crisis, lamenting that he never achieved anything worthwhile, he envisages his own unceremonious funeral, attended by his more successful friends. Whilst Lenny has become president, Barney Gumble has become an Oscar-winning actor, and the officiating Ned Flanders has become a bishop.

=== President Howard Lewis ===
- President in: Salt
- In the weeks before the film, his vice president, Maxwell Oates, is covertly assassinated by Russian sleeper agents under the guise of a heart attack. The sleeper agents are loyal to the KA initiative, a Soviet era plan to destroy the United States by initiating "Day X".
- At Oates' funeral, Russian President Matveyev is almost assassinated by Evelyn Salt, a supposed KA sleeper agent. The assassination attempt severely damages US-Russian relations, bringing them to the brink of war.
- To amplify tensions further, another KA sleeper agent carries out a suicide bombing in the White House. Lewis is evacuated to the Presidential Emergency Operations Center alongside the Chairman of the Joint Chiefs, Secretary of Defense and National Security Advisor.
- In the bunker, Lewis orders the US nuclear arsenal to ready status as a deterrent. However, CIA Russia Desk chief Ted Winters reveals himself as Nikolai Tarkovsky, another KA sleeper. Tarkovsky kills everyone in the bunker except Lewis.
- Tarkovsky demands Lewis use the unlocked nuclear football to target Mecca and Tehran, intending to turn the Middle East and Muslim communities against the US, too.
- In the film's theatrical cut, Lewis refuses and is knocked out by Tarkovsky. Lewis is rescued by Salt, who remains loyal to the US. She stops the attack and kills Tarkovsky.
- In the director's cut, however, Tarkovsky kills Lewis rather than knock him out. Salt is still able to stop the nuclear attack and kill Tarkovsky, but Lewis' successor, Speaker of the House Joseph Steppens, is implied to be another KA sleeper.
- Played by: Hunt Block

=== President Liedermann ===
- President in: The Stone Dogs
- Dies in office in 1991
- Party: Republican

=== President Limbaugh ===
- President in: Infinite Jest
- Limbaugh is referred to as "recently assassinated"

=== President Lindberg ===
- President in: The Fifth Element
- President of the United Federated Territories
- In 2263, Earth is threatened with destruction by the Ultimate Evil. After foolishly ordering a battleship to fire on the Evil (which destroyed the ship with all hands on board), Lindberg orders Major Korben Dallas to find the five elements that would destroy the Evil (which he was able to do seconds before Earth would have been destroyed).
- Played by: Tom 'Tiny' Lister Jr.

=== President Manfred Link ===
- President in: First Family
- Served as mayor, congressmen, and senator from Minnesota before being elected president after the accidental deaths of his opponents.
- Played by: Bob Newhart

=== President Abraham Linkidd ===
- President in: Captain Carrot and His Amazing Zoo Crew
- Former president of the United Species of America; a goat
- Memorialized in Earth-C's version of Washington, D.C., in the Linkidd Memorial

=== President Walter Nathaniel Livingston ===
- President in: Arc Light
- From New York
- Serves term during the Russian invasion of China. When Russia plans to use tactical nuclear weapons to end the war, the Russians inform the U.S. to prevent an accident nuclear exchange.
- Is impeached for warning the Chinese which invites a strike against the U.S., and not gaining a commitment from the Russian for the removal of their nuclear weapons.
- Removed from office, and replaced with Vice President Paul Steven Constanzo
- Party: Democratic

=== President Bradford Gregory Lockridge ===
- President in: Power Play by Timothy J. Culver, a pseudonym for Donald E. Westlake (1971 novel)
- Was a congressman, and later senator from Pennsylvania.
- Was president in the mid-1960s; serves one term and is not reelected.
- Goes insane; his attempt to defect to China is stopped by his family.

=== President Bedford Forrest Lockwood ===
- President in: The Better Angels (1979) and Shelley's Heart (1995) by Charles McCarry
- Was from Kentucky, and served from 1993 to 1997 (The Better Angels) and 2001–2005 (Shelley's Heart).
- Defeats President Franklin Douglass Mallory and runs against him four years later.
- Impeached for his ordering the assassination of King Ibn Awad, an Arab monarch who is about to hand over two nuclear weapons to the terrorist group Eye of Gaza.
- Resigns after learning his chief of staff, Julian Hubbard, has his intelligence agent half brother Horace manipulate the computer returns giving Lockwood the election.
- Party: Democratic

=== President John Lockwood ===
- President in: Wrong Is Right
- Played by: George Grizzard

=== President Charles Logan ===
- 46th President in: 24
- Played by: Gregory Itzin
- 2006–2007
- Served as vice president until Cabinet unanimously invoked the 25th Amendment after President Keeler is hospitalized following an attack on Air Force One.
- Eighteen months after being sworn in, he is still president (Keeler's fate is unknown) and signs a strategic defense treaty with the Russian president. Logan views this as the crowning achievement of his time in office, though the day is marred by the assassination of former president David Palmer and the threat of European terrorists releasing nerve gas on U.S. soil. He reinstates former CTU agent Jack Bauer to active duty after Bauer exposes Logan's chief of staff Walt Cummings' involvement in both. It is later revealed that Logan is one of the principal instigators of the day's events.
- After Bauer exposes his role in the conspiracy, he is arrested by his Secret Service and quietly forced to resign from office in order to prevent the country from suffering from his actions.
- He is later stabbed by his ex-wife, Martha Logan. He clinically dies, but is revived and survives the attack. He later advises President Allison Taylor and attempts suicide, but survives with substantial brain damage.
- Previously served as a United States Senator from California, Lieutenant Governor of California, and a Member of the California State Assembly
- Party: Republican

=== President Eugene Lorio ===
- President in: Jack & Bobby
- Played by: Paul Sorvino
- His son died while serving in the War of the Americas.
- Elected as a Democrat in 2036, he says in a 2049 interview (as part of a documentary in the series' flash-forward) that he knew, going into the final debate of the 2040 campaign, that he would lose to either Republican candidate Dennis Morganthal or independent candidate Robert McCallister.
- Party: Democratic

=== President Furbish Lousewart ===
- President in: Schrödinger's Cat Trilogy
- Author of Unsafe Wherever You Go
- Anti-technological Luddite
- Accidentally started World War III after mass arrests of suspected radicals
- Party: People's Ecology Party

=== President Alexander "Lex" Joseph Luthor ===
- President in: the DC Universe
- Impeached for the use of the illegal supersteroid Venom, the theft and use of an Apokyliptian Battle Suit, and the attempted murder of Superman and Batman. Succeeded by Vice President Pete Ross
- Party: Tomorrow Party

=== President Jordan Lyman ===
- President in: Seven Days in May
- Lyman is unpopular and controversial due to Republican opposition to a controversial arms control treaty with the Soviet Union, and the Joint Chiefs of Staff meticulously plan a coup d'état against him. Lyman, depicted as rather mediocre and uncertain of himself, grows in the course of the book to exhibit the leadership needed for the crisis, and manages not only to foil the coup but also neatly defuse the crisis without leaving a traumatic imprint.
- Played by: Fredric March
- Party: Democratic

=== President Lyman ===
- President in: Nothing but the Truth
- Survives an assassination attempt where he is shot in the shoulder, and three weeks later orders retaliatory strikes on military bases in Venezuela, claiming they orchestrated the attack.
- His administration is accused of misleading the public and Congress to justify the strikes. It is revealed in an expose by the Capital Sun-Times that a report of CIA officer Erica Van Dorn exonerating Venezuela was purposefully ignored.
- A special prosecutor appointed by Lyman later prosecutes Rachel Armstrong, a Sun-Times journalist, for contempt of court when she refuses to reveal the name of the source that identified Van Doren as a CIA employee to a grand jury.
- The former chief of staff to his Vice President is later indicted for speaking to Armstrong, albeit only as a corroborative source.
- Secret Service codename: Peacock
- Played by: Scott Williamson

=== President Jeffrey Lynch ===
- President in: Shadowrun
- 42nd U.S. President
- Served two consecutive terms: 1993–1997 and 1997–2001
- Defeated by Martin Hunt in the 2000 election.

== M ==
=== President Timothy Garde Macauley ===
- President in: From the Files of the Time Rangers
- Called "The Once and Future President"
- Macauley is the favorite of various Greek gods, especially Apollo, who are secretly active in the modern U.S. In Apollo's view, Macauley must become president in order to avoid the destruction of humankind, and the god gets him elected twice.

=== President Hairy Macgee ===
- President in: Dilbert (S02E17)
- Is elected by popular vote via Internet.
- Falls from Air Force One at an altitude of 30,000 feet over a garbage truck and does not suffer any injuries.

=== Acting President Natalie Maccabee ===
- President in: Agent X
- Played by: Sharon Stone

=== President John Mackenzie ===
- President in: First Daughter
- Played by: Michael Keaton

=== President Pauline Mackenzie ===
- President in: Salvation
- Comes from an observant Jewish family
- Serves term during a crisis involving a large asteroid, codenamed "Samson", heading towards Earth.
- Is revealed that the previous administration masterminded the Atlas Program, which involved the weaponization of asteroids to be used as weapons against enemies of the United States.
- Suffers from a stroke while giving a televised address to the nation about the impending crisis before she can say anything about the actual asteroid.
- The nation is told she had died, and Vice President Monroe Bennett assumes the presidency under the 25th Amendment.
- Later revealed that her illness and stroke were orchestrated by Bennett, who had slowly been poisoning her with mercury through her asthma inhaler
- Later revealed to be alive and recovering in secret, having been rescued by United States Secret Service agents loyal to her, who feared what those loyal to Bennett would do if they discovered she survived. The agents divert her upon arrival at George Washington University Hospital, where they convince her personal physician to tell the public she had died. Her family's Judaism, which forbids any desecration of a corpse, is used as the justification for her being buried without an autopsy being performed.
- Later works with Secretary of Defense Harris Edwards to have Bennett captured and detained beneath the White House, allowing her to approach the Joint Chiefs of Staff and the Cabinet in The Pentagon to request she be reinstated. After hearing of Monroe's treachery, they take her side.
- During a press conference where she announces the attempted coup d'état, the Emergency Alert System takes over the broadcast before she can announce the impending asteroid collision. It is revealed that the missiles have been hijacked by hacker group RE/SYST, causing Mackenzie to not take immediate retaliatory action against the Russian government.
- Nominates billionaire aerospace scientist Darius Tanz to serve as her vice president after Bennett's arrest, believing his lack of political history and good rapport with the public will help her administration.
- Has her presidency challenged again when Bennett emerges from hiding after escaping custody and takes his case to the Supreme Court of the United States, arguing he is still lawfully president and his removal from office was illegal and unconstitutional. When the court is about to vote in Mackenzie's favour, he orchestrates a bombing of the building which seriously injures the Chief Justice, whose swing vote in the decision had yet to be announced.
- After the Supreme Court bombing, the capital falls into chaos as infighting between United States Armed Forces factions loyal to Bennett and others to Mackenzie battle one another to take control. US Army and Secret Service officers loyal to Bennett are able to lock down and infiltrate the White House, capturing and detaining a defiant Mackenzie in the Oval Office.
- As Bennett is about to address the nation, video footage of the now conscious Chief Justice is broadcast on all networks and cell phones, in which he confirms his vote in Mackenzie's favour, shifting the decision to 5–4 and rendering her the legal president. After a brief standoff, the soldiers accompanying Bennett realize they have been deceived and reaffirm their allegiance to Mackenzie.
- Despite re-securing her presidency for a second time, she is shot and killed by a remote controlled sniper rifle while leaving a "Unity Rally" held to celebrate the supposed return to normalcy for her administration.
- She is buried in Arlington National Cemetery in a highly televised funeral. Tanz assumes the presidency under the 25th Amendment after her death.
- Played by: Tovah Feldshuh

=== President Alfred MacAlister ===
- President in: Red Dead Redemption 2.
- Presumably elected president in 1896
- Does not appear physically in game, but is seen on the game's physical map and on the Prominent Americans Cigarette Card Set
- Approves the finalized demarcation lines for the states of Ambarino, Lemoyne, New Austin, New Hanover, and West Elizabeth.
- Assassinated in 1901 and is replaced by Vice President Thaddeus Waxman.
- Based on William McKinley.

=== Acting President Peter MacLeish ===
- President in: Designated Survivor (S01E11)
- Serves as acting president after President Kirkman invokes the 25th Amendment prior to undergoing surgery. Mostly focuses his efforts on weakening the country (such as not taking steps to stabilize the economy) as part of the overall conspiracy, and attempts to cover up his connection to said conspiracy by giving a shoot-to-kill order on the man who attempted to assassinate Kirkman, overriding his advisors' orders to take the man alive.
- Relieved of his emergency duties once Kirkman successfully recovers from surgery. Shortly thereafter, Kirkman arranges an FBI sting to expose MacLeish's involvement in the conspiracy. While this was successful, his wife shoots him before he could be arrested and interrogated before shooting herself.

=== President Kenneth Kemble MacMann ===
- President in: No Way to Treat A First Lady
- Dies after First Lady Elizabeth Tyler MacMann confronts him over his affairs

=== President Henry Talbot MacNeil ===
- President in: Voyage to the Bottom of the Sea
- MacNeil is elected in 1972 and reelected in 1976.
- Played by: Ford Rainey

=== President James MacPherson ===
- President in: The Last Jihad, The Last Days, The Ezekiel Option, The Copper Scroll, and Dead Heat
- Serves from 2009 to 2016
- Was CEO of a successful investment firm called the Joshua Fund and Governor of Colorado
- Treasury Secretary Stuart Morris Iverson attempts and fails to assassinate him
- Party: Republican

=== President Bill Magnus ===
- President in: The Bourne Ascendancy
- Is in the midst of brokering a historic peace treaty between Israelis and Palestinians, which the terrorist El Ghadan is trying to prevent
- Jason Bourne is coerced by the terrorists to kill the president or his friend Soraya Moore and her daughter will die

=== President Franklin Douglass Mallory ===
- President in: The Better Angels and Shelley's Heart by Charles McCarry, and Wrong is Right (film).
- Born in New York, he was a senator from Massachusetts who defeated an unpopular liberal president, and was defeated narrowly four years later by Bedford Forrest Lockwood.
- Sends a crewed mission to Ganymede, starts a fusion energy program, attempts to bring Western Canada into the U.S., and appoints five Supreme Court Justices.
- Married to his wife Marilyn for thirty years until her death during his first year as president.
- His lover and chief aide after his wife's death is Susan Grant, who is murdered when his political enemies find out she is pregnant with his child.
- Wins reelection against Lockwood after a disputed election that was nearly stolen from him by agents of the intelligence services controlled by the White House Chief of Staff's brother.
- Played by: Leslie Nielsen in Wrong is Right.

=== President Tiffany Malloy ===
- President in: Unhappily Ever After
- Former U.S. Senator from California.
- Played by: Nikki Cox

=== President Malone ===
- President in: For Us, The Living
- Serves from 1945 to 1950
- Was a senator.

=== President Man ===
- President in: Invader Zim
- The leader of the US who hails from President Land, President Man deals with important issues such as Moofy the girly ranger getting stuck in Zim's lawn and the return of Santa. His decisions have been known to be influenced by offerings of chocolate-covered ninja star cookies. He is quick to give up all of his power to Santa upon his return.
- His appearance, voice, and mannerisms appear to be a parody of George W. Bush, who was the real-life president at the time of the show's airing.
- Played by: Jeffrey Jones

=== President Mandy ===
- President in: Underfist: Halloween Bash
- In Grim & Evil's world, she is the tenth president, after George Washington, Thomas Jefferson, Roosevelt, John F. Kennedy, Richard Nixon, Abraham Lincoln, Grim and Morg, and Billy.
- She turns her house in Endsville into the new White House.
- In the Underfist: Easter Beatdown artwork, she replaces George Washington on the one dollar bill.

=== President Manheim ===
- President in: Pet Shop of Horrors
- Was President during the Second World War. He dies in office.

=== President Adair T. Manning ===
- President in: Behind Enemy Lines 2: Axis of Evil
- Deals with a crisis in North Korea
- Somewhat reluctant to use massive force against North Korea
- Vietnam veteran who served with the US Army Rangers

=== President Richard Manning ===
- President in: The Imagemaker (1985 film)
- A fake recording of his corruption is used by a political insider to advance his career.

=== President Manning ===
- President in: The Book of Fate
- Someone attempts to assassinate him, but one of his aides is killed and another has his face disfigured.

=== President Julia Mansfield ===
- President in: Hail To The Chief
- Played by: Patty Duke

=== President Bradford March ===
- President in: The Power by Colin Forbes (novel)
- Former Senator of a southern state

=== President Vincent Margolin ===
- President in: Deep Six, Cyclops, Treasure, Dragon, and Sahara
- Originally the vice president, Margolin becomes president in August 1989 at the end of Deep Six following the abduction and brainwashing of his predecessor by a Korean criminal organization being paid by (but not loyal to) the Soviet Union, and remains in office until 1996.
- Former Senator from Montana

=== President Olivia Marsdin ===
- President in: Supergirl
- Played by: Lynda Carter
- Earth-38 president in 2016; she believes in tolerance for aliens from other planets, and signs a bill giving them amnesty and a path to citizenship.
- She is secretly an alien of the Durlan species.
- Due to her birth on another planet (and thus, outside of the United States), she is ineligible to serve as president, due to the restrictions in the natural-born-citizen clause and resigns.
- Party: Democratic

=== President James Marshall ===
- President in: Air Force One
- Medal of Honor recipient during the Vietnam War
- Promotes an interventionist line on foreign policy and a strong stance against terrorism (met with political opposition from Speaker of the House Franklin Danforth, in the novel).
- Personally responsible for retaking Air Force One after the plane is hijacked by Kazakh terrorists.
- 50 years old
- First-term President, up for reelection later on in the year that the film is set in. In the third year of his presidency (novel).
- Two-term former Governor of Iowa (in the novel). The film also states that his first campaign was for the U.S. House.
- Graduated from University of Iowa in the early 1970s (novel)
- Played by: Harrison Ford
- Party: Republican (novel).

=== President Kevin Martindale ===
- President in: Shadows of Steele by Dale Brown
- Continues as president in other Brown novels
- Former two-term vice president
- Former Secretary of Defense
- Former U.S. Senator from Texas
- Defeated for reelection by Thomas Thorne of Virginia
- Reelected four years later (during Plan of Attack). Becomes the only president since Grover Cleveland to hold two nonconsecutive terms.
- Martindale has female running mates in both elections
- Party: Republican

=== President Elias Martinez ===
- President in: The Event
- First African-American and Cuban American president.
- Born to a Cuban mother and African American father in Miami, Florida
- Attended Yale University
- Selects Raymond Jarvis, a Republican as his vice president, creating the first bi-partisan administration in recent history.
- Is informed anonymously of the detention of 97 slow-aging, humanoid extraterrestrials in Alaska, who were captured in 1945. Despite protest from various members of his cabinet, he eventually comes to an agreement with their leader to have them released and given asylum.
- Poisoned in an assassination attempt by Jarvis, who associates with a militant group of the extraterrestrials who were not captured, and have since assimilated into American society. Martinez survives and has Jarvis removed from office.
- Married to Christina Martinez, who is later revealed to be one of the extraterrestrials who was not captured in the 1945.
- Party: Democrat
- Played by: Blair Underwood

=== President Richard Martinez ===
- President in: Cory in the House
- Played by: John D'Aquino
- Has a daughter, Sophie Martinez

=== President Master ===
- President in: "The End of Time" (Doctor Who)
- Becomes president after copying his genetic signature into the body of Barack Obama, but his tenure only lasts for a few hours before the procedure is reversed by Rassilon.
- Played by: John Simm

=== President Ted Matthews ===
- President in: My Fellow Americans
- Matthews becomes president after President William Haney resigns. He is later arrested.
- Played by: John Heard
- Party: Republican

=== President William "Bill" Matthews ===
- President in: The Devil's Alternative

=== President Max ===
- President in: Sam & Max Save the World, Sam & Max Beyond Time and Space, and Sam & Max: The Devil's Playhouse
- A hyperkinetic rabbit-like creature that becomes president after accidentally decapitating the previous president (who is revealed to be an actual puppet) in an attempt to dehypnotise him, and defeating an animated statue of Abraham Lincoln in an emergency election.
- Used the presidency as a means of purchasing exorbitantly priced items of Boscotech needed to aid his and Sam's investigations, usually by providing bogus federal grants.
- Max's presidency is hallmarked by deliberate environment damage, excessive use of giant battle robots, and a war between the three Dakotas over custody of Mount Rushmore.
- Manages to remain president despite many allegations of war crimes, concerted campaigns calling for his impeachment, Sam selling the United States to Canada (after which it is renamed Lower Manitoba), and being briefly zombified.
- Became the High Priest of the Ocean Chimps after foiling an evil plot by the ghost of his vice president, his and Sam's pet goldfish Mr Spatula. However, Sam fears that this violates the separation of church and state.
- Won the Nobel Peace Prize due to Hell freezing over.
- After accidentally ingesting some albumin from Junior, an elder god, Max transforms into a giant monster (predicted as the second-most likely outcome of his presidency). After rampaging through New York City for eight days, Max dies during a failed attempt to save him (although another Max created by his and Sam's earlier use of time travel takes his place). He is succeeded as president by Agent Superball, who had been installed as emergency president during Max's incapacitation/rampage.
- Party: Random Violence and Destruction Party

=== President Robert Maxwell ===
- President in: Seven Days
- His administration authorises extensive use of Project Backstep, a secretive NSA project based in Nevada that uses an experimental time travel device to avert disasters before they take place.
- The first use of the device successfully saves Maxwell, as well as his vice president and the president of Russia, from being killed by Chechen terrorists in a cyanide gas attack on the White House.
- It is later used to prevent rogue General Wayne Starker from usurping President Maxwell's administration by staging a false flag nuclear detonation in Death Valley, which he blames on China as an excuse to attack them, after they invade Taiwan.
- When Vice President McIntyre commits suicide after his illegitimate daughter, a US Army pilot, is killed on a mission in Serbia, Maxwell authorises a backstep to save her.
- Maxwell is later addressed directly by a group of veterans suffering Gulf War syndrome, who take a Los Angeles Metro Rail train hostage and threaten to blow it up unless they are paid $300 million in reparations. The hostages are initially killed, but Maxwell is convinced by Project Backstep to authorise use of the device to prevent it happening.
- Project Backstep intervenes to prevent recordings of Maxwell's sessions with his psychiatrist, where he discussed plans to assassinate Manuel Escalante, the dictatorial President of Peru, being stolen and used to blackmail him. It is revealed his Chief of Staff Howard Eastman, in league with Escalante, was the mastermind of the plan along with several corrupt FBI agents.
- Maxwell's daughter Deedee is saved by the Project Backstep team, who succeed in preventing her from being killed by a jealous classmate at a rave.
- Played by: Holmes Osborne

=== President Alexander Mays ===
- President in: Vanished! by James Ponti
- In the primary elections, he ran against popular senator Pete Caldwell from California and won. In the general election, he defeated Tom Prescott, the governor of Michigan.
- Daughter Lucy Mays is central to the novel, as she is suspected of being involved in middle school pranks.

=== President Robert 'Bobby' McCallister ===
- President in: Jack & Bobby
- Nicknamed "The Great Believer"
- Born in Hart, Missouri to university English history professor Grace McCallister. He was initially raised to believe his father was a Chilean archaeology professor executed for his political beliefs. He later discovered his and his older brothers biological father was Juan Roberto Alba, a Mexican busboy his mother met waitressing in college, who was later convicted of murder in Texas.
- Although raised in an atheist household, McCallister later found religion due to influence from his future father-in-law and became an Episcopal minister.
- He was subsequently elected as a Missouri Congressman to succeed his brothers term, and then later became Governor of Missouri.
- Elected as the 51st president in 2040, defeating the incumbent Democrat Eugene Lorio and Republican candidate Dennis Morganthal.
- Married to First Lady Courtney McCallister. Has four children, including John McCalliser and Henry McCallister, who died at age 16 in a drunk driving incident.
- His older brother, Congressman Jonathan 'Jack' McCallister, was a veteran of the War of the Americas and a former public defender, whose untimely death during a convenience store robbery inspired Bobby to enter politics.
- Administration and cabinet level officials included Vice President Karen Carmichael (who President McCallister was accused of having an affair with) and Senior Counselor Marcus Ride.
- During his administration, much of Chicago is destroyed by a dirty bomb detonated by a renegade terrorist group from Canada.
- Portrayed by: Logan Lerman (child) and Tim Robbins (adult)
- Party: Independent, after losing the Republican nomination

=== President Charles McBride ===
- President in: Scimitar SL-2 by Patrick Robinson
- Interested only in his domestic agenda and ignores evidence of a terrorist plot that threatens to cause a massive tidal wave.
- Born in Vermont
- Party: Democratic

=== President Andrew McAlister ===
- President in: Shadowrun
- Elected in 2028, serves from 2029 to 2037
- Defeats three-term incumbent William Jarman (POTUS #46)
- 47th US president
- Also the last U.S. president; becomes the first president of the combined United Canadian American States (UCAS) in 2030. The former Prime Minister of Canada (Harold Frazier) becomes the first vice president of the UCAS.
- Defeated by Martin Vincenzo (Technocrat party) in the 2036 election.

=== President Leslie Harrison McCloud ===
- President in: Kisses for My President
- First female president who resigns due to pregnancy.
- Played by: Polly Bergen

=== President Elizabeth McCord ===
- President in: Madam Secretary
- Former Secretary of State and former CIA analyst.
- First woman to hold the powers of president when she served as acting president. She is also the first woman elected President of the United States.
- Assumes the powers of the presidency briefly when contact is lost with Air Force One carrying President Dalton and the Speaker of the House, the vice president is undergoing emergency surgery, and the president pro tempore of the Senate is senile after a series of strokes and believes that the president is still Ronald Reagan. She uses her presidential powers to issue a pardon for Erica James. McCord relinquishes the power when Air Force One touches down again.
- Elected to the presidency in the 2020 presidential election.
- 46th President of the United States since January 20, 2021
- Her vice president is former Arizona senator Carlos Morejon, a Republican.
- She is an Independent, and the third Independent to be elected president, after President Washington, and her immediate predecessor, President Dalton.
- Is the third president to serve as or hold the powers of the president two non-consecutive times, after Presidents Grover Cleveland and George H. W. Bush, due to her brief time as acting president.
- Played by: Téa Leoni

=== President Harvey McCullen ===
- President in: Resistance 2
- 34th President of the United States
- President from 1951 to 1953.
- Former Vice President of the United States.
- Succeeds President Noah Grace after Grace's assassination for his betrayal of humanity to the Chimera in the Chimeran War, and restores democratic rule of law to the United States with the end of Grace's totalitarian regime.
- Leads the United States during the Chimeran invasion of 1953.
- McCullen is killed along with his entire cabinet by the Chimera in Denver, Colorado, on May 28, 1953, during the country's final fall to the alien onslaught.
- Succeeded by General Douglas MacArthur
- Party: Republican

=== President Fiddleford Hadron "Old Man" McGucket ===
- President in: Gravity Falls
- 45th President of the United States.
- McGucket is a skilled inventor who, after becoming traumatized by witnessing Bill Cipher's home dimension, invents a memory-erasing gun. Repeated usage of the gun erodes McGucket's sanity to the point where he becomes Gravity Falls' "local kook". He regains his memories and sanity during the show's second season, though he retains a lot of his eccentricities. In a tweet, Gravity Falls creator Alex Hirsch revealed that within the show's universe, McGucket was elected the 45th president and invented a cure for COVID-19 using "gizmos".

=== President John McIntyre ===
- President in: Quantum: Deadly Matter by Patrick Illinger
- McIntyre is a former war journalist for the Denver Post, who was saved by the soldier Kenton Williams in Khafji when the city was attacked by Saddam Hussein's troops in the 1991 invasion of Kuwait.
- As president he, together with Chancellor of Germany Gisela Theisen, recruits the book's protagonist, Nicola Caneddu to investigate the potential threat of a new superweapon based on neutrinos.
- After the weapon, which was built by Lakshmi Rajamattanoree to make her country the new super-power in the world, is destroyed, he plans to invest billions into new particle physic research, to use it more for the interests of his own country.

=== President Bob McKendrick ===
- President in: Payday 3
- Played by: John de Lancie
- First seen as a Republican candidit for the Mayor of DC in Payday 2 was brought to power from the payday gang rigging an election in the "Election Day" heist, contracted by political ally and Senator Henry "The Elephant" Simmons, winning the election and becoming mayor of DC.
- Only briefly mentioned in Payday 3 by Shade to have become president in the time between Payday 2 and Payday 3.

=== President Thomas Kyle McKenna ===
- President in: World War III
- Played by: Rock Hudson

=== President George McKenna ===
- President in: X-Men 2
- Is attacked by a brainwashed Nightcrawler, who is nearly killed by the President's Secret Service guards.
- McKenna is deceived by Colonel William Stryker, the mastermind of Nightcrawler's attack, into ordering a raid on the Xavier Mansion as part of a larger scheme to wipe out mutants.
- Nearly orders a nationwide crackdown on mutants until the X-Men provide him with evidence of Stryker's crimes
- Played by: Cotter Smith

=== President James W. McNaughton ===
- President in: "Executive Clemency" by Gardner Dozois and Jack Haldeman
- Issues the "One Life" ultimatum
- Launches strikes on Mexico and Panama at the request of the Indonesian government. World War III follows.
- Survives crash of Air Force One in northeast US, and is rescued and taken to Northview, Vermont, where he resides after the dissolution of the US.

=== President McNeil ===
- President in: Futurama
- Organizes military resistance to an Omicronian invasion when he believes that a diplomatic solution would involve handing himself over.
- Killed by Lrr of the Planet Omicron Persei 8 in 3000.

=== President Philip Riley Mead ===
- President in: Deus Ex
- Extremely unpopular president, said in a newspaper article to have a 35% approval rating, and is mentioned to have survived a coup attempt.
- Governor of Florida c. 2027.

=== President Dan Melrose ===
- President in: The Lottery
- Vice president who became president when Thomas Westwood is assassinated.
- Played by: Steven Culp

=== President-Elect Jeryd Mencken ===
- President-Elect in: Succession
- A far right Congressman and online provocateur from Virginia, Mencken sought the Republican nomination in 2020 after a campaign waged by media baron Logan Roy and his channel, ATN, forced the incumbent Republican president to drop out of the race for re-election.
- At an emergency Republican National Convention meeting to select a new nominee, Mencken secured the Roy family's support (and thus the nomination) by allying with Logan's son, Roman, who in turn secured Logan's support by arguing Mencken's extreme views and nationalist tendencies would boost ATN viewership.
- As the nominee, Mencken faced off against the Democratic candidate, New York Governor Daniel Jimenez, in the general election. The initial result was close and unclear, with recounts and firebombing of voting centres making a definitive result impossible for the media to define.
- Roman and his brother Kendall, following the death of Logan, had ATN call the election for Mencken to force matters to a head, as they sought Mencken's backing for their takeover bid of ATN vs. tech guru Lukas Mattsson.
- Assuming the title of President-elect despite no sufficient, official declaration of results, Mencken nevertheless betrayed the Roy's by allying with Mattsson in return for an 'American CEO' of Waystar Royco.
- Played by: Justin Kirk
- Party: Republican

=== President William Menen ===
- President in: Dagger by William Mason
- Target of a complex assassination plot developed by the Soviets and led by his chief of staff and vice president

=== President Albert M. Merdle ===
- President in: The Lathe of Heaven by Ursula K. Le Guin
- Remains the President throughout all the changes in reality caused by George Orr, even if much of his actual power is lost toward the end.

=== President John Merwin ===
- President in: The Best Man
- The governor of a western state, he attends the party convention whose winner would almost certainly become the next President of the United States. He receives the nomination when former Secretary of State William Russell throws his support behind him in order to prevent Senator Joe Cantwell from receiving it.

=== President Selina Meyer ===
- 45th and 47th President of the United States in Veep (Season 3–5, 7)
- Born Selina Catherine Eaton.
- Married, and later divorced Andrew Meyer, the father of her daughter, Catherine.
- Former Senator from Maryland who loses in her party's presidential primary to Stuart Hughes, and then becomes Hughes' running mate and eventual vice president.
- She was initially sidelined within the Hughes administration, forced to abandon many of her initiatives including Senate filibuster reform and a Clean Jobs Bill at the behest of the president. She gained more influence after successfully campaigning during the 2014 midterm elections and ends up announcing her candidacy for president in 2016 after Hughes decides not to run again due to a spy scandal that threatened impeachment. She adopts the campaign slogan "Continuity with Change".
- After Hughes resigns to care for his mentally ill wife, Meyer is inaugurated as the first female president, and appoints Senator Andrew Doyle as her vice president.
- During her eight-month-long tenure, she proposed to introduce a far-reaching subsidized childcare program via the Families First Bill (also known as the Mommy Meyer Bill), funded through the scrapping of an outdated nuclear defense system costing $50,000,000,000. However, Congressional opposition due to the potential jobs losses this would incur, an accidental pledge to increase nuclear defense spending by $10,000,000,000 made during Meyer's inaugural State of the Union address after President Hughes' speech had been loaded onto a teleprompter by mistake, and public hostility to the bill led the White House to secretly lobby against it so that Meyer could win the upcoming election. During a congressional inquiry launched by Representative Moyes (who received the same information package from lobbyists Amy Brookheimer and Dan Egan and White House staffers Jonah Ryan and Richard Splett), Leigh Patterson, a former White House aide scapegoated for a Medileaks scandal, alleged that the 2016 Meyer campaign used confidential information for targeted campaigning aimed at bereaved parents, which Richard Splett accidentally confirmed. Communications Director Bill Ericsson was scapegoated for both the data breach and the use of lobbyists against the Families First Bill.
- She narrowly wins her party's nomination and selects Senator Tom James as her running mate to replace Doyle (albeit after Governor Danny Chung of Minnesota declined, former Defense Secretary George Maddox proved himself to be a poor choice, and Meyer refused to nominate a female running mate), who on occasion eclipsed Meyer due to his folksy personality.
- Meyer ties with Bill O'Brien when they both receive 269 electoral college votes in the 2016 residential election. A recount in Nevada not only maintained the Electoral College tie but lost Meyer her lead in the popular vote following the discovery of uncounted military absentee ballots in Washoe County stolen by a disgruntled postal worker over Meyer's closure of several post offices.
- While lobbying House Representatives for their support in the upcoming vote, it is revealed that Tom James was lobbying several to abstain in order to allow him to become president via the Senate vote. When privately questioned by Meyer, James said that he was motivated by Meyer's recent acts of incompetence; after a brief shouting match, Meyer and James have sex.
- After Meyer unwittingly posts a tweet insulting O'Brien, she blames this faux pas on Chinese hackers, and subsequently imposes punitive sanctions. At a secret meeting at Camp David, President Lu Chi-Jung of China proposes to liberalise the governance of Tibet, establishing a system similar to that in Hong Kong, in exchange for the lifting of sanctions.
- Meyer experiences another tie when the United States House of Representatives fails to reach a majority verdict on selecting who should become president. With the delegations for Missouri, Pennsylvania and Vermont abstaining, Meyer loses to O'Brien 22–25, but with O'Brien being one state's vote shy of winning. Meyer decided to let O'Brien win the House vote, preferring to run against him in four years rather than allow James to serve as president for upwards of twelve years, although by this point Congressman Ryan had already cast New Hampshire's vote for Meyer.
- After the tie in the House, the Senate votes to appoint a vice president from the two presidential nominees' running mates (James and Montez) as per the 20th Amendment, prior to which Meyer privately agreed to serve as James's vice president. The vote also results in a tie, which is broken by incumbent Vice President Andrew Doyle in his capacity as President of the Senate. Doyle selects Laura Montez, O'Brien's running mate and a member of the opposing party, as revenge against Meyer for backtracking on her offer to make him Secretary of State if she won the election.
- As the office of president is vacant due to the tied House vote, and House Speaker Jim Marwood announces that a second vote to determine the president will not be cast, Montez immediately ascends to the presidency and replaces Meyer.
- Post presidency, Meyer sets up the Meyer Fund, takes part in election monitoring on behalf of the United Nations in the Republic of Georgia (during which both candidates attempt to bribe her), and enters into a relationship with Qatari ambassador Mohammed Al Jaffar. However, shortly after the publication of Meyer's biography First Woman: A Woman First, Leon West publishes Mike McLintock's diary after he accidentally left it at the offices of The Washington Post. Despite numerous damning revelations, when the public is informed of Meyer's actions during her presidency that helped free Tibet from China, her popularity soars and gives her the confidence to run again in the 2020 presidential election. Initially running on the slogan "New Selina Now", she abandoned it in favour of "Man Up" after berating popular progressive US Senator from New York Kemi Talbot during a primary debate.
- Meyer is presented with a lower ranking award from the Nobel Foundation for her actions in freeing Tibet, but during her time in Oslo a warrant for her arrest is issued by the International Criminal Court due to accusations of her administration committing war crimes by violating Pakistan airspace and using a drone to kill innocent civilians at a terrorist's wedding. She is able to escape back to the United States with help from the Finnish embassy and the President of Georgia, using Catherine and Marjorie's wedding as a distraction. Whilst Meyer's popularity rose after news of the drone strike became public, it dipped again when it was revealed that one of its casualties was an elephant.
- She is able to narrowly secure her party's nomination for president during the 2020 National Convention in Charlotte, North Carolina, but she is forced to alienate and dismiss her entire former team, ruin the lives of her former friends and competitors and accept Jonah Ryan (who ran for the nomination on a populist, nativist platform) as her running mate. This was so that Meyer would avoid either nominating Talbot as her running mate or serving as Talbot's running mate herself.
- Meyer defeats Montez and serves a single four-year term as president, which is achieved through election interference in collusion with China in exchange for the unchallenged re-annexation of Tibet; Montez, running against Meyer, would otherwise have been guaranteed re-election despite her own poor approval ratings, according to Chinese polling data. Meyer is the second president since Grover Cleveland to serve two non-consecutive terms.
- Meyer's only full term was notable for the successful permanent overturning of same-sex marriage, resulting in a permanent rift with Catherine and her wife Marjorie (formerly part of Meyer's Secret Service detail), and the impeachment of Jonah Ryan (which Meyer may have encouraged behind the scenes).
- Dies in 2045 of natural causes, reported as having died somewhere between the ages of 75 and 77 due to her constantly lying about her age. After resting in state at the United States Capitol, she is interred at her presidential library at Smith College, Massachusetts. Upon being interred in the crypt, coverage of her funeral is immediately pushed out of the news cycle by the death of Tom Hanks at the age of 88.
- Played by: Julia Louis-Dreyfus

=== President Jeffrey Michener ===
- President in: The Last Ship
- Native of Evanston, Illinois.
- The former Secretary of Housing and Urban Development under Barack Obama, he is in charge of establishing a safe zone in Doak Campbell Stadium in Tallahassee, Florida during the initial outbreak of the Red Flu. However, he organizes for his son to be transported to the stadium from an infected location in Ann Arbor, Michigan, causing a mass outbreak of the virus in the southern United States. His son and wife later die, and he is forced to kill his daughters to spare their suffering after they become infected with the Red Flu.
- Naturally immune to the Red Flu, he is taken in and brainwashed into becoming a puppet of Sean Ramsay, leader of the quasi-fascist Immunes, who plan to murder all survivors who are not naturally immune. He was later rescued from the Immunes by United States Navy sailors from the USS Nathan James, and as the only surviving member of the presidential line of succession assumes the role of president after his rescue.
- Attempts to commit suicide due to the guilt of mercy killing his family, but later recovers and supports the USS Nathan James in their mission to spread the cure and defeat the Immunes.
- Declares St. Louis the new capital of the United States after he is officially sworn in as president in the season 2 finale and establishes the Old St. Louis Courthouse as the new White House.
- His policies during the post-plague reconstruction of the United States, which include the rationing of food, the restriction on cash withdrawals from banks, and restriction of land ownership rights, are criticized by regional leaders across the country.
- Apparently commits suicide after AMT reporter Jacob Barnes reveals his complicity in the Doak Campbell Stadium outbreak and is succeeded by Vice President Howard Oliver.
- His "suicide" is later revealed to be an assassination, carried out by Secret Service agents loyal to Chief of Staff Allison Shaw and the regional leaders, who seek to disband the United States federal government. Their aim is to bring Oliver to power; as he still had surviving family and friends, he could be easier blackmailed into becoming a puppet for their cause.
- Played by: Mark Moses

=== President Wyatt Midkiff ===
- President in: Tom Clancy's Op-Center: Into the Fire by Dick Couch and George Galdorisi

=== President Hunnis Millbank ===
- President in: Virtual Light
- African-American female president, elected for two terms. Her public relations campaign was managed by Harwood Levine.

=== President Phil Stacy Miller ===
- President in: The Last Man on Earth
- Played by: Boris Kodjoe

=== President Phil Tandy Miller ===
- President in: The Last Man on Earth
- The only two people known to be left on Earth decide to vote for Tandy Miller; succeeded by Phil Stacy Miller after second vote.
- Since the office of the presidency effectively no longer exists in the post-apocalyptic world, Tandy Miller only invokes the fact that he is president when he wants to win an argument or make a speech.
- Briefly lives in the White House and is in possession of the original U.S. Constitution document.
- Played by: Will Forte

=== President Richard Mills ===
- President in: Prison Break
- A progressive president well into his second term. He apparently chooses Caroline Reynolds as his vice president because she was a woman. However, he later tells her he will not support her in her own bid to seek nomination because he feels her ambition outweighs her integrity. She arranges his assassination soon after by having him poisoned, and is immediately sworn in as president.
- Played by: Daniel J. Travanti

=== President William Milton ===
- Former president in: The Walking Dead
- A native of Ohio, he was the patriarch of the Milton family, a political dynasty similar to that of the Bush family and Kennedy family.
- Served sometime in the 1980s, prior to the events of the series. He was the first president since Benjamin Harrison to sport a full beard during his time in office.
- After the wildfire virus outbreak in 2010 and resulting zombie apocalypse, Milton used his power and influence as a former president to create a safe zone that would later be known as the Commonwealth.
- Due to the collapse of government and society, the Commonwealth would become one of the few functioning civilisations in the former United States of America, alongside the Civic Republic of Philadelphia.
- After serving as governor of the Commonwealth and commander-in-chief of its military for many years, Milton died and was succeeded by his daughter, Pamela Milton.
- Played by: Tom Luse

=== President Mimeo ===
- President in: Putney Swope
- Played by: Pepi Hermine

=== President Evelyn Mitchell ===
- President in Zero Day
- Is in office when a massive cyberattack wreaks havoc across the United States and causes 3402 deaths.
- Appoints popular former President George Mullen as head of the Zero Day Commission, authorised by the United States Congress and granted special powers to investigate the incident.
- Portrayed by: Angela Bassett

=== President William Harrison "Bill" Mitchell/Dave Kovic ===
- President and presidential decoy in: Dave
- Suffers a massive stroke during a sexual liaison with his secretary. His Chief of Staff Bob Alexander engineers a plot to seize power, using Kovic to masquerade as Mitchell (after Kovic had been recruited to appear as Mitchell to enable the liaison), discrediting Vice President Gary Nance (whom Kovic was convinced to be mentally unstable) and succeeding as vice president, whereupon Kovic would fake another stroke and allow him to succeed to the presidency.
- Kovic's charm and enthusiasm repairs Mitchell's public image, with pundits attributing Mitchell's change in personality to surviving his stroke. Only Oliver Stone suspects a conspiracy, noting slight differences in appearance before and after the stroke.
- After Alexander forges Mitchell's signature to veto a bill that would guarantee funding for homeless shelters (including a juvenile home visited by Kovic and First Lady Ellen Mitchell and endorsed by the latter), Kovic (with the aid of his accountant friend Murray Blum) reviews the federal budget and proposes several cuts and investments that would raise the $650 million necessary to preserve the shelters.
- Kovic (inspired by Ellen after she learns of the masquerade and the two spend a night on the town together) proposes a job guarantee bill.
- After Kovic fires Alexander, he accuses both Mitchell and Nance of being the ringleaders of the First Liberty scandal which he masterminded, raising the prospect of impeachment. Kovic confesses Mitchell's involvement in the scandal to a joint session of Congress, then presents evidence that disgraces Alexander and proves Nance's innocence, then feigns a second stroke to escape the public eye.
- Mitchell dies five months after 'his second stroke', is buried in Arlington National Cemetery, and is succeeded by Nance, while Kovic returns to his normal life and runs for office as a D.C. councilman. Kovic's job guarantee bill is passed into law under Nance to honor Mitchell's legacy while Alexander and several other members of the Mitchell administration are incarcerated for their roles in the First Liberty scandal.
- Both played by: Kevin Kline

=== President Horace C. Mitchell ===
- President in: Saturday's Heroes
- Played by: Charles Trowbridge

=== Presidents Harris Moffatt I, II and III ===
- Presidents in: Vilcabamba
- Harris Moffatt I tries to oppose the invasion of Earth by the alien Krolp, as part of which he merges the U.S. with Canada and becomes its prime minister. With the Krolp proving to be overwhelmingly strong, Moffatt I flees Washington, D.C., and remains president and prime minister of a rump U.S-Canada.
- His son, Harris Moffatt II, negotiates a peace treaty with North American Krolp Governor Flargar that allows the rump U.S-Canada to exist for the next fifty years. He is killed by a drunken renegade Krolp.
- The grandson, Harris Moffatt III, is faced with a demand from the Krolp to conduct strip mining for silver and a small amount of gold miles below the surface of northeastern Utah, which would most likely render the rump U.S. and Canada uninhabitable. He embarks on a failed rebellion that the Krolp crush in three days, dissolving the rump U.S. and embarking on their strip mining anyway. Moffatt III and his wife Jessica attempt to flee to rump Canada after the uprising is crushed. However, 20 minutes later, they are captured and forced into exile in the Krolp's North American capital of St. Louis.

=== President Monahan ===
- President in Superintelligence
- First female US president
- Played by: Jean Smart

=== Acting President Henry Moncas ===
- Acting president in: Jem by Frederik Pohl (1979 film).
- Speaker of the House when the president and vice president are killed in a 21st-century nuclear war.

=== President Richard Monckton ===
- President in: The Company
- Monckton is a roman à clef representation of Richard M. Nixon.
- Former senator from Illinois
- Party: Republican
- Played by: Jason Robards

=== President Maxwell Monroe ===
- President in: Under Siege (1986 television film)
- In office when a series of terror attacks are carried out across the United States, with the United States Capitol Building, a military base, airliners and shopping malls being targeted by suicide bombings.
- Is pressured by his hawkish Cabinet to take retaliatory measures against Iran, who they suspect is behind the attacks, despite Ambassador Sajid Moktasanni claiming the country has no involvement.
- Works closely with Secretary of Defense George Simon and FBI Director John Garry to exercise caution and investigate the true causes of the attacks and identify the perpetrators.
- Played by: Hal Holbrook

=== President Laura Priscilla Montez ===
- President in Veep (Season 6 onward)
- Second female president after Selina Meyer
- Born Laura Priscilla Cunningham just outside Cleveland, Ohio.
- Former United States senator from New Mexico.
- Married to Alejandro Montez, and by taking his surname falsely attempts to present herself as Hispanic to further her political career.
- Chosen by Senator Bill O'Brien of Arizona as his running mate in the 2016 Presidential Election.
- After a tie in the electoral college during the election, and a subsequent tie in the House of Representatives vote to determine who becomes president out of the two presidential nominees (Meyer and O'Brien), Montez is elected vice president by the Senate in a tight vote and effectively becomes president after the House Speaker Jim Marwood refuses to hold another vote. In reality, the House would be constitutionally required to hold continuous votes until a president is elected.
- Members of her Cabinet included Meyer's Vice President Andrew Doyle as Secretary of State (who voted for Montez as a tiebreaker as revenge against Meyer for reneging on her promise to appoint him as Secretary of State) and former EM Wheelright CEO Charlie Baird Jr. as Treasury Secretary (O'Brien's initial choice, who had a short-lived relationship with Meyer which ended after she decided not to bail out EM Wheelright, forcing it to declare bankruptcy).
- Is awarded the 2017 Nobel Peace Prize after the freeing of Tibet earlier that year, though Meyer is the one who negotiated Tibet's independence.
- During her presidency she presides over a damaging government shutdown instigated by Congressman for New Hampshire Jonah Ryan and his caucus, the Jeffersons, after they vote against a bill to raise the debt ceiling due to Ryan not being invited to the unveiling of Meyer's presidential portrait; after Ryan attempts to hold out for the abolition of daylight saving time, he loses the leadership of the Jeffersons, who reform as the Libertonians and agree to a deal with Montez to end the shutdown.
- Following the death of Supreme Court Justice Tenny, Montez appoints former President Stuart Hughes to fill the vacancy, following avid press speculation that Meyer would be appointed.
- After Mike McLintock's lost diary is leaked, it is revealed that Montez falsely took credit for freeing Tibet from the People's Republic of China from Meyer. This gives Meyer the confidence to run for president in 2020, despite the leak also revealing some damning revelations from her first tenure as president.
- She loses to Meyer in the 2020 presidential election as a result of Chinese election interference in collusion with the Meyer campaign in exchange for the unchallenged re-annexation of Tibet, as secret Chinese polling data revealed that Meyer's nomination would have effectively guaranteed Montez's re-election otherwise, despite Montez's poor approval ratings.
- She is later seen attending Meyers's funeral in 2045 at her presidential library in Smith College, Massachusetts. It is implied that she had undergone extensive cosmetic plastic surgery.
- Claimed to be the first elected female president of the United States, as Meyer became president following the resignation of her predecessor, Stuart Hughes. She is the first person to be elected president despite not running for the position.
- Played by: Andrea Savage

=== President Judson Moon ===
- President in: The Kid Who Became President
- Prevents the South American nation of Cantania from invading neighboring Boraguay, one of the world's biggest oil producers.
- Youngest president in U.S. history at age thirteen.
- Serves from 2001 to 2002, before resigning in favor of Vice President June Syers, who becomes the first African-American and female president.
- Party affiliation: Lemonade (fictional party)

=== President William Alan Moore ===
- President in: Big Game
- Born on June 30, 1951, in California.
- Survives an assassination attempt prior to the events of the film, which leaves his lead Secret Service bodyguard with bullet shrapnel lodged near his heart.
- Is referred to as a "Lame Duck President" in the media, indicating he may have recently lost a presidential election.
- Is evacuated from Air Force One before it is shot down over Finland en route to a pre-G8 summit in Helsinki.
- Moore is later hunted by his traitorous lead Secret Service agent and freelance terrorists through the Finnish wilderness.
- Aided by a 13-year-old hunter named Oskari who discovers the crashed escape pod.
- It is later revealed that the shooting down of Air Force One and his attempted murder is orchestrated by the vice president and members of the CIA to inspire a new war on terror.
- Played by: Samuel L. Jackson

=== President Mordecai ===
- President in: 2010: Odyssey Two
- Only mentioned in passing by Heywood Floyd

=== President Morgan the Fifth (no first name given) ===
- President in: The Scarlet Plague by Jack London
- Appointed President of the United States by the Board of Magnates in 2012, democracy having long before been replaced by an oligarchy of the richest. In 2013 the plague causes the total breakdown of civilization including the end of his presidency.

=== President Arthur Morgan ===
- President in: The Broker
- He is said to be the most unpopular president in American history, having almost started World War Three. In his reelection campaign, Morgan loses every state and D.C. except Alaska for a count of 535–3.

=== President Edward Morgan ===
- President in: The Amendment
- A radical pro-choice activist kidnaps First Lady Mary Morgan in exchange for funds to allow those wishing abortions to travel to Sweden.

=== President Perry Morgan ===
- President in The Residence
- The first openly LGBT president, he is married to First Gentleman Elliot Morgan (né Cox).
- Whilst hosting a state dinner for Prime Minister of Australia Stephen Roos in the White House, the White House Chief Usher is murdered. This results in an investigation being carried out by the D.C. Metropolitan Police and the FBI, assisted by private detective Cordelia Cupp.
- Officials in his administration include: Secretary of State Peter Paris, Chief of Staff Dana Hammond, Senior Advisor Harry Hollinger and Social Secretary Lilly Schumacher.
- Portrayed by: Paul Fitzgerald
- Political Party: Unspecified

=== President Morland ===
- President in: The Agency
- Appoints Thomas Gates head of the CIA
- Has the CIA watch his step-brother

=== President Arthur Morose ===
- President in: By Dawn's Early Light
- Is elected president in 1996.
- Miraculously survives the destruction of Washington, D.C., after domestic terrorists impersonating Russian radicals detonate a small nuclear device.
- Is thought to be dead along with most of his cabinet and the vice president. The Secretary of the Interior, on his way back from a trip to Baton Rouge, declares himself as the acting president. The president attempts to contact the secretary of the interior after the S.O.S. approves the launch of a nuclear missile to Moscow.
- Morose is found hours later by a military convoy and cancels the attack on Russia, narrowly avoiding a nuclear war.
- Played by Martin Landau in movie.
- Party: Democratic

=== President William Brent Morrow ===
- President in: V: The East Coast, a novel based on the mini-series.
- Former B-17 pilot during World War II
- Welcomes alien visitors, but is taken "into protective custody" by them when martial law is declared in response to stated terrorist attacks.
- Resists brainwashing and is rescued by the Resistance.

=== President Morse ===
- President in: Homeland
- First sitting president in the show to be named and shown on screen
- An outgoing president, he is to be replaced by the recently elected President-Elect Elizabeth Keane.
- After a terrorist attack takes place in Midtown Manhattan, he urges both Congress and Keane to reintroduce certain provisions in the Patriot Act in order to better combat self radicalization of American Muslims.
- Played by: Alan Dale.

=== President Eldridge Mosely ===
- President in: Winter Kills by Richard Condon
- Is vice president when President Tim Kegan was assassinated

=== President Cornelius Moss ===
- Former president in Designated Survivor.
- In office some time before Thomas Kirkman and Robert Richmond.
- Serves a single term, then takes leave from politics after the death of his wife, First Lady Elaine Moss.
- As a private citizen, he helps negotiate the release of 15 American aid workers kidnapped by a warlord in the African nation of Naruba.
- Later accepts position of Secretary of State in the Kirkman administration.
- In Season 2, he becomes a suspect in the murder of British MP Charlotte Thorne, with whom he was having an affair. While he is exonerated, he reveals that the emotional turmoil of ending the affair has caused him to revert to old addictions. He subsequently resigns his Cabinet post, though Kirkman states that he's free to return at any time.
- Returned to his post at some unspecified point later in the same season. However, when it is learned that he's been running political back channels without the president's knowledge, an enraged Kirkman dismisses him from the Cabinet.
- Kirkman and Moss seemingly mend fences when he is brought in to salvage failing negotiations between the fictional nations of East and West Hon Chu (stand-ins for North and South Korea). However, it is then discovered that Moss has been leaking classified information to the press in order to hold the Kirkman administration accountable for its mistakes. Kirkman once again dismisses Moss, and promises to open a criminal investigation into his activities.
- Justifying his actions as protecting America from Kirkman's inexperienced leadership, Moss announces his intention to run for president again.
- Loses the 2020 presidential election to Kirkman.
- Political party: Republican
- Played by: Geoff Pierson

=== President Thomas D. Moss ===
- President in: Mars and Beyond
- Played by: Ed Asner

=== President William Mueller ===
- President in The People's Choice by Jeff Greenfield
- Loses reelection to MacArthur Foyle
- Party: Democrat

=== President Merkin Muffley ===
- President in: Dr. Strangelove
- During his administration, USAF Brigadier General Jack D. Ripper falsely issues "Wing Attack Plan R" to the 843rd Bomb Wing to launch a nuclear attack against the Soviet Union due to his belief that the Soviets have been engaging in a conspiracy to pollute American water supplies through fluoridation. The Soviet Doomsday Device is triggered, destroying most life on Earth (although Muffley and key members of the US Government may have survived by occupying mineshaft space, if plans described by the titular Dr. Strangelove had been pursued).
- Muffley was a parody of Adlai Stevenson II, the then United States Ambassador to the United Nations, and former Governor of Illinois and Democratic presidential candidate.
- See Merkin
- Played by Peter Sellers in the original film and Steve Coogan in the 2024 stage adaptation.

=== President George Mullen ===
- Former President in Zero Day
- A native of Hudson, New York, he served in the United States Army as an intelligence officer for two tours in the Vietnam War.
- Later studied at Fordham University and worked as a federal prosecutor with the Department of Justice.
- During his political career he was selected as Time Person of the Year.
- Elected in 2008 alongside Vice President Davis, and became known for skill in generating bipartisan support during his administration. However, after the death of his son Nicholas Mullen due to a drugs overdose, and an affair with his Chief of Staff Valerie Whitesell (resulting in a love child), he chose not to run for a second term.
- Married to former First Lady Sheila Mullen, a judge who is later nominated to the United States Court of Appeals for the Second Circuit. His daughter, Alexandra Mullen, is a junior Congresswoman for New York's 10th District and estranged from him.
- Appointed head of the Zero Day Commission by incumbent President Evelyn Mitchell, which is granted special powers by the United States Congress to investigate a massive cyberattack that resulted in 3402 deaths across the United States.
- Secret Service codename: Legend
- Portrayed by: Robert De Niro
- Political Party: Unspecified

=== President Ed Murphy ===
- President in: The Price of Freedom (1980s role-playing game)
- Cuts back on defense spending in his first years in office.
- Surrenders to the Soviet Union when they demonstrate a working anti-ballistic missile system.
- Remains in office as part of a "caretaker" government.

=== President Kyle Murrel ===
- President in: "The Stork Factor" by Zach Hughes
- Officially known as "Brother Kyle Murrel, President of the Republic by the Grace of God". He is the president of a theocratic USA.

=== President Rosalind Myers ===
- President in: Cyberpunk 2077: Phantom Liberty
- President of the New United States of America in the Cyberpunk franchise's alternate reality.
- Former CEO of Militech, a corporation now deeply intertwined with the NUS government.
- Instigated the Unification War to take back former territories of the collapsed United States.
- Accompanies the player character briefly as a support companion.
- Played by: Kay Bess
- Political Party: Federalist (possibly merger of Democratic and Republican parties)

=== President Sam Myers ===
- President in: Vox by Christina Dalcher.
- Leader of a theocratic USA in a dystopic future, where women are not allowed to speak more than 100 words per day.
- Is portrayed as a mere puppet of Reverend Carl Corbin, the leader of a deeply religious, Christian movement that has taken over the country.
- His brother Bobby Myers, his closest adviser, suffers brain damage after a ski accident, requiring the protagonist, neuroscientist Jean McClellan, to help the government find a cure.
