= List of The New York Times number-one books of 1982 =

The American daily newspaper The New York Times publishes multiple weekly lists ranking the best-selling books in the United States.

== Fiction ==
The following list ranks the number-one best-selling fiction books, in the hardcover fiction category.

Date	Book	Author
January 3	An Indecent Obsession	Colleen McCullough
January 10	An Indecent Obsession	Colleen McCullough
January 17	An Indecent Obsession	Colleen McCullough
January 24	An Indecent Obsession	Colleen McCullough
January 31	An Indecent Obsession	Colleen McCullough
February 7	An Indecent Obsession	Colleen McCullough
February 14	The Hotel New Hampshire	John Irving
February 21	An Indecent Obsession	Colleen McCullough
February 28	North and South	John Jakes
March 7	North and South	John Jakes
March 14	North and South	John Jakes
March 21	The Parsifal Mosaic	Robert Ludlum
March 28	The Parsifal Mosaic	Robert Ludlum
April 4	The Parsifal Mosaic	Robert Ludlum
April 11	The Parsifal Mosaic	Robert Ludlum
April 18	The Parsifal Mosaic	Robert Ludlum
April 25	The Parsifal Mosaic	Robert Ludlum
May 2	The Parsifal Mosaic	Robert Ludlum
May 9	The Parsifal Mosaic	Robert Ludlum
May 16	The Parsifal Mosaic	Robert Ludlum
May 23	The Parsifal Mosaic	Robert Ludlum
May 30	The Parsifal Mosaic	Robert Ludlum
June 6	The Man from St. Petersburg	Ken Follett
June 13	The Parsifal Mosaic	Robert Ludlum
June 20	The Parsifal Mosaic	Robert Ludlum
June 27	The Parsifal Mosaic	Robert Ludlum
July 4	The Prodigal Daughter	Jeffrey Archer
July 11	The Parsifal Mosaic	Robert Ludlum
July 18	The Parsifal Mosaic	Robert Ludlum
July 25	The Prodigal Daughter	Jeffrey Archer
August 1	The Prodigal Daughter	Jeffrey Archer
August 8	The Prodigal Daughter	Jeffrey Archer
August 15	Different Seasons	Stephen King
August 22	The Prodigal Daughter	Jeffrey Archer
August 29	Different Seasons	Stephen King
September 5	Different Seasons	Stephen King
September 12	Master of the Game	Sidney Sheldon
September 19	Master of the Game	Sidney Sheldon
September 26	Master of the Game	Sidney Sheldon
October 3	Master of the Game	Sidney Sheldon
October 10	Space	James Michener
October 17	Space	James Michener
October 24	Space	James Michener
October 31	Space	James Michener
November 7	Space	James Michener
November 14	Space	James Michener
November 21	Space	James Michener
November 28	Space	James Michener
December 5	Space	James Michener
December 12	Space	James Michener
December 19	Space	James Michener
December 26	Space	James Michener

== Nonfiction ==
The following list ranks the number-one best-selling nonfiction books, in the hardcover nonfiction category.

Date	Book	Author
January 3	A Light in the Attic	Shel Silverstein
January 10	A Light in the Attic	Shel Silverstein
January 17	A Light in the Attic	Shel Silverstein
January 24	A Light in the Attic	Shel Silverstein
January 31	A Light in the Attic	Shel Silverstein
February 7	A Light in the Attic	Shel Silverstein
February 14	A Light in the Attic	Shel Silverstein
February 21	A Light in the Attic	Shel Silverstein
February 28	A Light in the Attic	Shel Silverstein
March 7	A Few Minutes With Andy Rooney	Andrew A. Rooney
March 14	Jane Fonda's Workout Book	Jane Fonda
March 21	Jane Fonda's Workout Book	Jane Fonda
March 28	Jane Fonda's Workout Book	Jane Fonda
April 4	Jane Fonda's Workout Book	Jane Fonda
April 11	Jane Fonda's Workout Book	Jane Fonda
April 18	Jane Fonda's Workout Book	Jane Fonda
April 25	Jane Fonda's Workout Book	Jane Fonda
May 2	Jane Fonda's Workout Book	Jane Fonda
May 9	Jane Fonda's Workout Book	Jane Fonda
May 16	Jane Fonda's Workout Book	Jane Fonda
May 23	Jane Fonda's Workout Book	Jane Fonda
May 30	Jane Fonda's Workout Book	Jane Fonda
June 6	Living, Loving and Learning	Leo Buscaglia
June 13	Jane Fonda's Workout Book	Jane Fonda
June 20	Jane Fonda's Workout Book	Jane Fonda
June 27	Jane Fonda's Workout Book	Jane Fonda
July 4	Jane Fonda's Workout Book	Jane Fonda
July 11	Jane Fonda's Workout Book	Jane Fonda
July 18	Jane Fonda's Workout Book	Jane Fonda
July 25	Jane Fonda's Workout Book	Jane Fonda
August 1	Jane Fonda's Workout Book	Jane Fonda
August 8	Life Extension	Durk Pearson and Sandy Shaw
August 15	Life Extension	Durk Pearson and Sandy Shaw
August 22	Jane Fonda's Workout Book	Jane Fonda
August 29	Life Extension	Durk Pearson and Sandy Shaw
September 5	Life Extension	Durk Pearson and Sandy Shaw
September 12	Jane Fonda's Workout Book	Jane Fonda
September 19	Jane Fonda's Workout Book	Jane Fonda
September 26	Jane Fonda's Workout Book	Jane Fonda
October 3	Jane Fonda's Workout Book	Jane Fonda
October 10	Life Extension	Durk Pearson and Sandy Shaw
October 17	Life Extension	Durk Pearson and Sandy Shaw
October 24	Life Extension	Durk Pearson and Sandy Shaw
October 31	Jane Fonda's Workout Book	Jane Fonda
November 7	Jane Fonda's Workout Book	Jane Fonda
November 14	Jane Fonda's Workout Book	Jane Fonda
November 21	And More by Andy Rooney	Andrew A. Rooney
November 28	And More by Andy Rooney	Andrew A. Rooney
December 5	And More by Andy Rooney	Andrew A. Rooney
December 12	And More by Andy Rooney	Andrew A. Rooney
December 19	And More by Andy Rooney	Andrew A. Rooney
December 26	And More by Andy Rooney	Andrew A. Rooney

== See also ==
- Publishers Weekly list of bestselling novels in the United States in the 1980s
