= Roy Walford =

Professor of pathology

- Born: June 29, 1924; San Diego, California, United States
- Died: April 27, 2004 (aged 79); Santa Monica, California, United States
- Known for: Life extension

Roy Lee Walford, M. D. (June 29, 1924 – April 27, 2004) was a professor of pathology at University of California, Los Angeles School of Medicine, a leading advocate of calorie restriction for life extension and health improvement, and a crew member of Biosphere 2.

== Career highlights ==
Walford is credited with significantly furthering aging research by his discovery that laboratory mice, when fed a diet that restricted their caloric intake by 50% yet maintaining nutritional requirements, almost doubled their expected life span.

He received his medical degree from the University of Chicago in 1948. He completed his internship at Gorgas Hospital, Panama, and served his residency at the V.A. Medical Center in Los Angeles. He then served two years in the US Air Force during the Korean War.

Walford joined the faculty at the University of California at Los Angeles (UCLA) in 1954. He became a professor of pathology at the UCLA School of Medicine in 1966. He became Professor of Pathology and Laboratory Medicine, Emeritus, for UCLA, when he left to join the crew of Biosphere 2 in 1991.

While at UCLA, Walford served in the following roles:

- Director of the Blood Bank and of the Hematology Division of the Clinical Laboratories (1959–1980)
- Director of the School of Medical Technology (1962–1972)
- Chairman of the Vivarium Committee (1965–1968)

In addition to his service at UCLA, he was an expert advisor in immunology for the World Health Organization from 1969 to 1984, was a senatorial delegate to the White House Conference on Aging in 1981, and a member of the National Institute on Aging.

His honors and awards include:

- Levine Award of the American Society of Clinical Pathology
- Research Award of the American Aging Association
- Kleemeier Award from the Gerontological Society of America
- Henderson Award from the American Geriatrics Society
- 1998 Longevity Prize of the Foundation IPSEN
- The Senator Alan Cranston Award
- Infinity Award of the American Academy of Anti-Aging Medicine
- Asteroid #4629 was named after him by its discoverer (E. Helene) in 1986

Walford and his work were featured in print in dozens of articles in popular publications such as Omni, Discover, and Scientific American. During his life he also made dozens of featured appearances on various television shows.

== Roulette winnings ==
In 1947, while on vacation during medical school, Walford and Albert Hibbs, a mathematics graduate student, used statistical analysis of biased roulette wheels to "break the bank" in Reno. They tracked the results of the spins, determined which wheels were biased, and then bet heavily on the ones which were unbalanced. The casinos eventually realized that Walford and his friend knew what they were doing and threw them out. A Life magazine photographer captured the pair drinking milk and counting their chips in a photograph published in the December 8, 1947 issue. Their methods were also mentioned in the roulette book The Eudaemonic Pie by Thomas Bass. Different sources have the pair winning anywhere from $6,500 to $42,000. The high end is more likely, as Walford was reputed to have paid for part of his medical school education and a house from his winnings. The pair also bought a yacht and sailed the Caribbean for over a year.

== Gerontix ==
In 1981, Walford began a commercial collaboration with fellow researchers Richard Weindruch and Kathleen Yankee Hall, and her husband William Hall, a wealthy businessman. In her tribute after his death, Kathleen Hall wrote of Walford, "we both threw in a few thousand dollars and started a small business together." Incorporated in California as Gerontix, the company was to sell supplements intended to improve health and increase life span. The first Gerontix product was butylated hydroxytoluene (BHT), with lysine and zinc, which was sold in capsules and marketed as a treatment for herpes. Motivated by the success of the bestselling book Life Extension: A Practical Scientific Approach, by Durk Pearson and Sandy Shaw, the group intended to sell a package of products, called MaxiLife, which would capitalize on the release of Walford's book, Maximum Life Span. It was expected that Walford, a highly publicized researcher, would experience the same success as Pearson and Shaw. Before Walford's book was published and Gerontix started to manufacture its coordinated products, the manufacturer Twin Laboratories (Twinlab) began to sell a multi-ingredient supplement called MaxiLIFE, which the owners of Gerontix discovered in November 1982. Despite the potential for trademark conflict, the Gerontix group elected to proceed with plans to use the brand name MaxiLife. Twin Laboratories brought suit against Gerontix for trademark infringement, and the court issued a summary judgement in favor of Twin Laboratories on February 13, 1984. Before the resolution of the lawsuit, the Gerontix MaxiLife products were brought to market and sold poorly, partly because of the lackluster sales of Walford's book. Lack of success in federal court and in health food stores led to the demise of Gerontix. Gerontix subsequently brought suit for legal malpractice against the attorneys whom Gerontix had hired to obtain the trademark right to the name MaxiLife, but on February 17, 1989 a summary judgement against Gerontix was entered by Los Angeles Superior Court judge Loren Miller, Jr. Gerontix eventually appealed the case to the California Supreme Court after losing an appeal in the California Court of Appeals.

In Appendix B of Walford's Maximum Life Span he noted, "Additional additives, such as antioxidants and some of the other materials I've listed in Chapters 7 and 8, can be obtained from Gerontix Biological Research Products...," but he did not disclose that he would profit from the sale of Gerontix products. The company's MaxiLife product brochure, which refers to Walford and his research, also makes no mention of his connection to Gerontix.

== Biosphere 2 ==
Walford was one of the eight “crew members” who were sealed inside Biosphere 2 where they lived from September 26, 1991 to September 26, 1993. Walford served as the crew's physician. During his stay in Biosphere 2, the crew found that they could not grow as much food as anticipated, so Walford convinced the crew to follow his calorie restriction diet. In November of the first year the crew decided to open a cache of emergency food supplies grown outside of the bubble to supplement their meager diets.

== Death ==
At age 79, Roy Walford died of respiratory failure as a complication of amyotrophic lateral sclerosis (ALS), commonly known as Lou Gehrig's disease. He was cremated, and his ashes were scattered at sea.

According to Walford's friend and colleague, Kathleen Hall, his diagnosis of ALS came as a result of her urging him to see a physician when she noticed "the strangeness in Roy's gait." She says that before his death Walford "continued writing, taking courses on film production. He had me all over New York and in Dallas for just the right production shots." Meanwhile, Hall remembers that "Roy and I together with his daughter, Lisa, and his friends exhausted all the literature, looking for a cure, a solution. I found myself scouting the alleys of Chinatown in New York searching out a particular mushroom, looking for the best grass to help him through the pain." Even before developing ALS, Walford was no stranger to "grass." In his book Eternity Soup: Inside the Quest to End Aging, Greg Critser says that Walford's "consumption of marijuana was legendary."

Walford was survived by his three children. Their mother was Martha Sylvia Schwalb, to whom Walford was married for 20 years before divorcing in the 1970s.

== Published works ==
Walford authored several books, and set out his dietary beliefs in the bestseller Beyond the 120-Year Diet. In addition, he published at least 340 scientific papers, mainly focused on the biology of aging.

Walford authored or co-authored the following books:

- R. L. Walford (1960). Leukocyte Antigens and Antibodies. New York: Grune and Stratton, Inc.
- R. L. Walford (1969). "The Isoantigenic Systems of Human Leukocytes: Medical and Biological Significance". Series Haematologica 2. 2. Copenhagen: Munksgaard: 1–96.
- R. L. Walford (1969). The Immunological Theory of Aging. Copenhagen: Munksgaard.
- R. L. Walford (1983). Maximum Life Span. New York: W.W. Norton & Co. ISBN 0-380-65524-1.
- R. L. Walford (1986). The 120-Year Diet. New York: Simon and Schuster. ISBN 0-671-64904-3.
- R. H. Weindruch and R. L. Walford (1988). The Retardation of Aging and Disease by Dietary Restriction. New York: Charles C. Thomas. ISBN 0-398-05496-7.
- R. L. Walford and Lisa J. Walford (1994). The Anti-Aging Plan. New York: Four Walls Eight Windows. ISBN 1-56924-383-2.
- R. L. Walford (2000). Beyond The 120-Year Diet. New York: Four Walls Eight Windows. ISBN 1-56858-157-2.
