= Sandy Shaw =

Sandy Shaw may refer to:

- Sandy Shaw (writer) (born 1943), American writer on health
- Sandy Shaw (politician) (born 1960), Canadian politician

== See also ==
- Sandie Shaw (born 1947), English singer
