= CEO Exchange =

WTTW TV Program

CEO Exchange is a television program featuring conversations between the host and two CEO guests, often from related industries. It is hosted by Jeff Greenfield of CNN. The show was distributed by WTTW to public television stations. It aired from 2000 to 2006.

Except for the shows taped during a short third season, the interviews are recorded in front of audiences at business schools in the United States. Students and other guests are allowed to ask questions at certain points of the program.

Schools featured in previous broadcasts include:

- University of Washington Business School
- Columbia Business School
- The Wharton School of the University of Pennsylvania
- UCLA Anderson School of Management
- McCombs School of Business at The University of Texas at Austin
- Kellogg School of Management at Northwestern University
- Howard University School of Business
- Fordham University Graduate School of Business Administration
- Rutgers Business School
- Robert H. Smith School of Business at the University of Maryland, College Park
- University of Michigan Business School
- Haas School of Business at the University of California, Berkeley
- Stanford Graduate School of Business
- University of Southern California Marshall School of Business
- Fuqua School of Business at Duke University
- London Business School
- Johnson Graduate School of Management at Cornell University
- University of Chicago Graduate School of Business

== Reference list ==
CEO Exchange

CEO Exchange TV series

CNN

Jeff Greenfield

WTTW
