= Life Extension: A Practical Scientific Approach =

1982 book by Durk Pearson and Sandy Shaw

Editing Life Extension: A Practical Scientific Approach
- Author: Durk Pearson, Sandy Shaw
- Language: English
- Subject: longevity
- Publisher: Warner Books
- Publication date: 1982; 44 years ago
- Publication place: USA
- Pages: 858
- ISBN: 0-446-51229-X
- Followed by: The Life Extension Companion

Life Extension: A Practical Scientific Approach is a 1982 book (ISBN 0-446-51229-X) by Durk Pearson and Sandy Shaw that popularized the life extension and smart drug movements.

The authors promotes the theory that free radicals are a primary cause of aging and recommended antioxidant supplements to prevent the damage they supposedly do. The book makes a broad range of claims about ways to thwart aging and improve health and appearance.

One notable feature of the book is several full-page pictures of its male and female authors, Durk Pearson and Sandy Shaw, striking bodybuilding poses and showing off some impressive muscles for "sedentary research scientists," which they claimed was due to the "growth hormone releasers" they took daily.

== Criticism ==
Prominent aging researchers expressed mostly negative opinions of the book.

Leonard Hayflick deemed it "a glib, superficial overview of the field,“ adding that he "would be very unhappy to learn that there were substantial numbers of people depending on its contents for guidance.” But at the same time, Denham Harman, to whom the book was dedicated and whose free radical theory of aging was favored by Pearson and Shaw, opined, "I think basically the book is sound," and added "It’s nice to see a book on aging on the best-seller lists."

Roy Walford wrote, "gerontology has always been the happy hunting ground for faddists, charlatans, pseudoscientific fringe characters, and just misinformed enthusiasts with 'ready cures' for aging. ... Pearson and Shaw are among this long list of enthusiasts. ... Most of the Pearson/Shaw book relies on this lower-order category of evidence, and upon the testimonial posturing of Pearson and Shaw themselves." (At one time Walford was a partner in a company, Gerontix, selling supplements to combat aging and improve health.)
