= Shall We Tell the President? =

Novel by Jeffrey Archer

- First edition cover
- Author: Jeffrey Archer
- Publisher: Jonathan Cape
- Publication date: 1977

Shall We Tell the President? is a 1977 novel by English author Jeffrey Archer. A revised edition was published in 1986.

In the first edition, a plot to kill the President of the United States, Edward Kennedy, is foiled by Federal Bureau of Investigation agent Mark Andrews working with the head of the FBI. A love story complicates the plot. The book includes descriptive details of official Washington, for which the author lists sources.

The U.S. edition of the novel was published by Viking Press, where Kennedy's sister-in-law Jacqueline Onassis was then a consulting editor. Although Onassis was not involved in editing Shall We Tell the President?, she was criticized for not trying to deter her employer from publishing a novel about an assassination plot against a member of the Kennedy family. She resigned from Viking Press shortly after the publication.

After the success of Kane and Abel and The Prodigal Daughter, Archer published a revised edition of Shall We Tell the President?, replacing Kennedy (in real life a senator and a presidential candidate but never president) with the fictional character Florentyna Kane (who became president in The Prodigal Daughter) in order to link it with the other two novels. He also replaced Vice President Dale Bumpers (in real life governor and a senator) with the real-life Senator Bill Bradley of New Jersey. The author makes frequent references to William Shakespeare's play Julius Caesar.

== 1986 edition plot ==
A Greek man, Angelo Casefikis, enters a hospital with a gunshot wound to his leg demanding to speak to the FBI. Nick Stames, the head of the Washington field office, tasks agents Mark Andrews and Barry Calvert to take his testimony and they learn of a plot against the life of President Florentyna Kane with the involvement of an unnamed US Senator. Stames and Calvert are soon murdered, as is Casefikis in the hospital, leaving only Andrews alive with knowledge of the plot.

Andrews reports what he knows to the FBI Director Horatio Tyson, and becomes his direct report for the 7 days until the planned assassination. Investigating a number of US Senators who could potentially have been at the lunch where Casefikis overheard the conspiracy, Andrews begins to narrow down the suspects. Alongside his investigation, he begins a romantic relationship with Elizabeth Dexter, the daughter of potential conspirator Senator Henry Dexter. As Andrews gets closer to discovering the truth, he comes to the attention of the five conspirators, who decide to murder him with a car bomb on the day of the planned assassination. Having narrowed down the suspect US Senator to two persons - Robert Harrison and Henry Dexter - Andrews escapes the attempt on his life by a coincidence when Elizabeth visits his apartment and offers him a ride. When a moment of recall reveals to Andrews that Elizabeth had lunched with her father on the day Casefikis was shot, he realises the only possible conspirator is Harrison. The plot is foiled and three of the five conspirators are captured, but not before one of them shoots Harrison with a sniper rifle.

Andrews is injured in an attempt to shield Harrison from gunfire, but survives while Harrison perishes. President Kane personally congratulates him for his act of bravery, knowing nothing of the plot or of Harrison's involvement. Andrews rebuilds his intermittently frosty relationship with Elizabeth and accepts Tyson's offer of a new job.
