= Jeff Greenfield =

American journalist

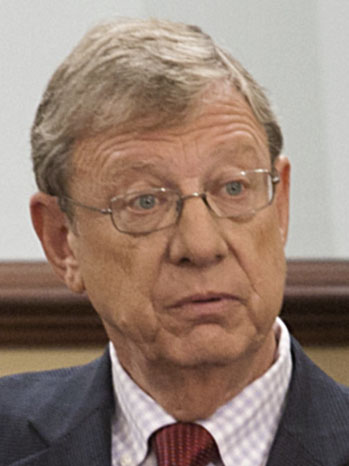
- Jeff Greenfield at Miller Center, 2011
- Born: Jeffrey Greenfield; June 10, 1943 (age 83); New York City, U.S.
- Education: University of Wisconsin, Madison (BA); Yale University (LLB)
- Occupations: Television journalist, author
- Notable credit: CBS Evening News Correspondent (2007–2011)
- Title: Senior Political Correspondent
- Spouses: Harriet Carmichael (m. 1968; div. 1993); Karen Anne Gannett (m. 1993, divorced); Dena Sklar (m. 2002)
- Children: 2
- Website: www.jeffgreenfield.net

Henry Jeffrey Greenfield (born June 10, 1943) is an American television journalist, lawyer, and author.

== Early life and education ==
He was born in New York City, to Benjamin and Helen E. Greenfield. He grew up in Manhattan and graduated in 1960 from the Bronx High School of Science. He has a sister, Janet Greenfield Elmo.

In 1964, he graduated with honors, obtaining a Bachelor of Arts degree from the University of Wisconsin–Madison, where he served as editor-in-chief of the Daily Cardinal. While at the university, Greenfield was inducted into the Iron Cross (now the Iron Shield Society), a collegiate secret society. In 1966, Greenfield graduated with honors with a Bachelor of Laws degree from Yale Law School, where he was a Note and Comment editor of the Yale Law Journal.

== Career ==
Greenfield was hired as a speechwriter for the 1968 presidential campaign of Senator Robert F. Kennedy. Greenfield assisted with RFK's speech, "On the Mindless Menace of Violence", that he delivered the day after Martin Luther King Jr.'s assassination.

Greenfield was chief speechwriter for New York City Mayor John Lindsay and also worked for seven years with political consultant David Garth.

Over the course of his journalistic career, Greenfield has reported mainly on domestic politics and the media, with occasional pieces on cultural matters. He appeared on the Firing Line television program as early as 1968. For five seasons, he hosted the national public television series "CEO Exchange" where he featured in-depth interviews with high-profile chief executive officers. He served as media commentator for CBS News from 1979 to 1983 and as political and media analyst for ABC News from 1983 to 1997, often appearing on the Nightline program. He was a senior analyst at CNN from 1998 to 2007. On May 1, 2007, Greenfield returned to CBS News, where he served as a senior political correspondent until April 2011. He hosted PBS's "Need to Know" from May 7, 2010, to June 28, 2013. More recently he has done political commentary on NBC Nightly News.

He has also authored or contributed to fourteen books and has written for Time, The New York Times, National Lampoon, Slate, and POLITICO Magazine. He wrote one novel, The People's Choice, with a plot that centers on the Electoral College.

Greenfield has won five Emmy Awards, two for his reporting from South Africa (1985 and 1990) and one for a profile of H. Ross Perot (1992). His bestseller Then Everything Changed was a finalist for the 2011 Sidewise Award for Alternate History, Long Form.

In the fall of 2020, Greenfield served as a Fellow at the USC Center for the Political Future. There, he led a study group discussing political media in the United States.

== Personal life ==
Greenfield has been married three times.

- His first wife was Carrie Carmichael, an author, whom he divorced in February 1993. They have two children: daughter Casey, also a Yale Law School graduate, and son David. Casey married screenwriter Matt Manfredi in 2004 and they divorced in 2006. Casey has a son with CNN legal analyst Jeffrey Toobin.
- On April 24, 1993, Greenfield married Karen Anne Gannett, from whom he is now divorced.
- In June 2002, he married Dena Sklar, a real estate broker. They live in Santa Barbara, California, and New York City.

Greenfield has seven grandchildren.

== Books ==
- with Jerry Bruno, The Advance Man. William Morrow. 1971. ASIN B000K0GKVS.
- with Jack Newfield, A Populist Manifesto: The Making of A New Majority. Praeger Publishers. 1972. ASIN B001NC8Q1E.
- No Peace, No Place: Excavations Along the Generational Fault. Doubleday. 1973. ISBN 978-0-385-01936-1.
- Television: The First Fifty Years. Abrams. 1977. ISBN 978-0-8109-1651-7.
- Jeff Greenfield's Book of Books. National Lampoon. 1979. ISBN 978-0-930368-37-1.
- Playing to Win: An Insider's Guide to Politics. Simon and Schuster. 1980. ISBN 978-0671247621.
- The People's Choice: A Novel. Putnam. 1995. ISBN 0-452-27705-1.
- Oh, Waiter, One Order of Crow! Inside the Strangest Presidential Election Finish in American History. Putnam. 2001. ISBN 978-0-399-14776-0.
- Then Everything Changed: Stunning Alternate Histories of American Politics: JFK, RFK, Carter, Ford, Reagan. G.P. Putnam's Sons. 2011. ISBN 978-0-399-15706-6.
- 43*: When Gore Beat Bush—A Political Fable. 2012. ISBN 978-1-614-52046-7.
- If Kennedy Lived: The First and Second Terms of President John F. Kennedy: An Alternate History. G.P. Putnam's Sons. 2013. ISBN 978-0-399-16696-9.
