= The People's Choice (novel) =

1995 novel by Jeff Greenfield

- Author: Jeff Greenfield
- Publisher: Putnam
- Publication date: September 12, 1995
- ISBN: 0-399-13812-9

The People's Choice: A Cautionary Tale is a 1995 novel written by American journalist Jeff Greenfield. In the novel, United States President-elect MacArthur Foyle dies after the general election, but before the Electoral College has a chance to vote him into office, and the media and the election process are swung into chaos.

== Synopsis ==
On Election Day in 1996, the Republican presidential ticket of Foyle–Block wins enough states to receive 305 electoral votes, compared with 233 electoral votes for the Democratic ticket of Mueller–Vincent. Since 270 electoral votes are needed to win the presidency, the issue of who should be the next president is thought resolved.

However, President-elect Foyle dies only days after the election in a freak accident. The Republican Party then promotes his running mate, Governor Theodore Block, to the top of the ticket. Governor Block quickly proves that he is a mental lightweight, his nickname being Teddy Blockhead, leading some to question his fitness for the presidency.

One of those questioning Block's fitness to be president is Michigan elector Dorothy Ledger, one of those forgotten people lost in a party's political machine who seems unimportant—until the fate of an election hinges on her actions. Ledger publicly questions whether she is required to vote for Block, and in so doing sets off a political firestorm and a minor rebellion among some Republican electors. A series of missteps by Block further exacerbates the issue.

Meanwhile, African-American preacher W. Dixon Mason and his supporters move toward endorsing their own favorite candidate, while Washington, D.C., "political powerbroker" Jack Petitcon and his allies also attempt to control the process. Avi DuPour is a popular liberal-bashing radio host who provides commentary on the proceedings.

== Analysis ==
The novel's plot exposes how much of a problem a potential rogue elephant (or donkey), also known as a maverick or faithless elector, in the Electoral College could become. The Electoral College voters are composed largely of people no one has ever heard, chosen by the political parties from their membership lists (or, as in the novel, some retired officials well past their prime), and they vote to elect a president and vice president, bound for the most part, by their solemn word to vote for the candidate they are pledged to support.

The situation Greenfield sets up demonstrates how, under the right conditions, electors and their votes can be manipulated by idealism, opportunism, and cynicism without reference to the voters who elected them, possibly even electing as President in December a person who was not even on the ballot in November.

The book highlights the little known United States Constitution directives on how a United States President is elected. People within each state vote for electors who assemble in December to cast the binding vote to select the next president. There is very little law forcing electors to vote for the person that their state selected. James Kirkpatrick praised the novel for highlighting this "metaphysical" bomb lurking in the Constitution.

Many of the characters are thought to have had real life counterparts at the time the novel was published.

== Reviews ==
Publishers Weekly stated, "Characterization sometimes takes a back seat to plot machinations here but, for the most part, what The Player did for Hollywood, The People's Choice, in its unabashed flailing of the American system, does for presidential politics.

Entertainment Weekly gave the novel a B-praised the premise of the book, however, stated the book failed to make anyone of the more than 90 characters in the book the emotional center of the novel. It also noted that as the United States has had incompetent presidents in the past, the scenario proposed in the novel is not the only way the United States can end up with an incompetent president.

Kirkus Reviews stated, "Greenfield has had a field day with Washington's establishment, the media's feeding frenzies, idealogues [sic] whose ethics could most charitably be described as flexible, and other of federal government's less edifying pilot fish. A grand entertainment cum history lesson whose triumphant bad taste, genuine wit, and uncommon sense could and should make it a landslide winner in the marketplace."

== Film adaptation ==
Film rights were obtained by Savoy Pictures.
