= Durk Pearson =

American writer and life extension advocate

- Born: August 19, 1943
- Died: October 26, 2024 (aged 81)
- Education: Massachusetts Institute of Technology
- Occupations: writer and life extension advocate
- Spouse: Sandy Shaw (m. 1968)
- Writing career
- Notable work: Life Extension: A Practical Scientific Approach

Durk Pearson (August 19, 1943 – October 26, 2024) was a research scientist best known for coauthoring a series of books on longevity, beginning with Life Extension: A Practical Scientific Approach.

== Early life ==
While a student at the Massachusetts Institute of Technology, he was a member of the MIT Science Fiction Society and one of the writers for the early underground comic God Comics. Pearson graduated from MIT with a triple major in physics, biology, and psychology.

== Career ==
Pearson had patents in the areas of oil shale and tar sands recovery, lasers, holography, and supplement formulations. Pearson assisted with equipment design and experiments for NASA's Space Shuttle. Pearson was also an International Society for Testing and Failure Analysis honoree.

== Publications ==
Pearson and his wife, Sandy Shaw, were the authors of Life Extension: A Practical Scientific Approach (ISBN 0-446-51229-X, Warner Books, 1982), The Life Extension Companion (Warner Books), The Life Extension Weight Loss Program, and Freedom of Informed Choice: FDA v. Nutrient Supplements, (Common Sense Press, 1993). The couple also wrote numerous articles on life extension, cognitive enhancement, anti-aging, weight loss, and other aspects of nutrition.

== Television, film, and video ==
Pearson and Shaw wrote, designed the stunts, and acted as technical advisors for a 1978 episode of The Wonderful World of Disney, called "Black Holes, Monsters That Eat Space and Time." They acted as scientific and technical advisors and received screen credits for the Clint Eastwood film Firefox. They received screen credits for acting as technical advisors for Douglas Trumbull's film Brainstorm, starring Christopher Walken and Natalie Wood. In 1988, Steve Sharon, Pearson, and Shaw wrote the thriller The Dead Pool, which was later sold to Warner Bros. and made into a film, once again starring Clint Eastwood, in his fifth and final appearance as “Dirty” Harry Callahan. Pearson and Shaw made a cameo appearance in the funeral scene, standing directly behind the bereaved.

== Court case on dietary supplements ==
In a civil action, Pearson and Shaw challenged the constitutional validity of several U.S. Food and Drug Administration (FDA) regulations that require sellers of dietary supplements to obtain FDA authorization before labeling such supplements with "health claims." In ruling against the FDA, the U.S. Court of Appeals for the District of Columbia found that the supplement health claims were constitutionally protected free speech.
