= The Prodigal Daughter =

Novel by Jeffrey Archer

- First edition cover
- Author: Jeffrey Archer
- Genre: Political fiction
- Publisher: Hodder & Stoughton
- Publication date: June 14, 1982
- Pages: 464
- ISBN: 978-0-671-42229-5

The Prodigal Daughter is a 1982 political fiction novel by English author Jeffrey Archer. It was first published by Hodder & Stoughton in the United Kingdom and by Linden Press in the United States. It is the story of Florentyna Rosnovski, the daughter of Abel Rosnovski of Archer's Kane and Abel. The novel, one of Archer's best sellers, portrays Florentyna's life from early childhood to her final ascension to the position of President of United States. In this way, President Kane becomes the first female U.S. president.

The character of Florentyna Kane also appears in Shall We Tell the President? by Archer. This book initially featured President Ted Kennedy, but following the success of Kane and Abel and The Prodigal Daughter, the character was changed to President Kane in later editions.

== Plot summary ==
The story begins by introducing Kane and Abel's past and the feud between them. It then tells the story of Kane and Abel from the perspective of their children, Florentyna Rosnovski and Richard Kane. Their childhood, and all the incidents and people who affected them, are portrayed in a similar manner as their fathers' lives were told in Kane and Abel. There are some inconsistencies, however. For example, after Abel's divorce from Zaphia in Kane and Abel Abel gets the custody of Florentyna. But in The Prodigal Daughter, Zaphia has custody of Florentyna. Richard and Florentyna meet by sheer chance and fall in love. When their parents are told, both sets naturally react explosively; Abel goes so far as to slap the daughter he had raised with great affection. The two lovers run away that day to a friend's house in another city.

Later, they two create a chain of retail stores named Florentyna's, which are a huge success. Abel helps his daughter anonymously, but refuses to accept his son-in-law. The tale takes a twist with the senior Kane's death, when Abel learns that Kane was the anonymous benefactor who helped him launch his hotel empire. He thus accepts Richard and his grandchildren and considers it an honor that his grandson is named William Abel Kane.

Richard and Florentyna take charge of the Baron Hotels, with Florentyna as chairwoman, and they then take over Lester's (Kane's bank).

Eventually Florentyna takes up politics due to the persuasion of a childhood friend named Edward Winchester. Florentyna's career becomes central to the plot, as she attempts to deal with the problems a very busy and successful mother faces, including the fact that her daughter has an abortion in the early 1980s and smokes marijuana in the mid-1970s. However, her career takes a back seat when Richard dies in a car crash in 1985. For some time, Florentyna loses the will to pursue anything, even her career. Then suddenly, seeing a homeless Vietnam Vet impels her to come "back with a vengeance." Working harder than ever, she comes very near her goal of becoming the first female U.S. President.

For the good of her party, she strikes a deal with her opponent, Pete Parkin to support him if he promises not to run for a second term, and if he makes her his vice presidential candidate. During Parkin's term, Florentyna averts many a crisis: actions for which the President takes full credit. At the end of his term, however, he not only reneges on his promises and wants to run, but undermines Florentyna's support by announcing Ralph Brooks, the other Illinois Senator as his running mate. It seems as though Florentyna's dream will never become a reality. Disgusted with the entire situation, she leaves Washington. While she is playing golf and discussing what to do with her life—her son William is now President of Lester's, with Edward, Secret Service agents arrive to announce President Parkin's sudden death from a heart attack, though there are insinuations that his death was orchestrated to put Florentyna at the helm. Florentyna thus becomes the President, and marries Edward Winchester, her childhood friend.

== Inspiration ==
Archer got the inspiration for Florentyna's political life and rise to the Presidency from the elections of Golda Meir, Margaret Thatcher and Indira Gandhi.
