= Sandy Shaw (writer) =

American writer and life extension advocate

- Born: July 28, 1943
- Died: March 12, 2022 (aged 78)
- Education: UCLA
- Occupations: writer and life extension advocate
- Spouse(s): David Shakocius (m. 1963, divorced) Durk Pearson (m. 1968)
- Writing career
- Notable work: Life Extension: A Practical Scientific Approach

Sandra Lois Shaw (née Yallen; July 28, 1943 – March 12, 2022) was an American writer on health, and an avid advocate of life extension.

== Education ==
Sandy Shaw's father was an engineer and her mother a housewife. She received her degree from U.C.L.A. in 1966, with a double major in chemistry and zoology and a minor in mathematics.

== Writing and media appearances ==
Shaw and husband Durk Pearson were the co-authors of several books on "life extension", emphasizing megadoses of antioxidants. They have appeared on many television programs, including several appearances on Larry King Live. They have appeared in many TV documentaries about aging, including two by the BBC, one by the Canadian Broadcasting Corporation, and on Japanese TV. During the period of 1978 to 1986, they appeared over 30 times on The Merv Griffin Show, including the final "goodbye" program. They have been featured in interviews and articles in The Wall Street Journal (a front-page story on them), Omni, Penthouse, Playgirl, Forbes, Newsweek, People, US Weekly, Fit, The American Druggist, PSA Magazine, Longevity, Men's Journal, as well as magazines in France, Germany, and Japan.

Shaw and Pearson wrote, designed the stunts, and acted as technical advisers for an episode of The Wonderful World of Disney, which aired in 1978, called "Black Holes, Monsters That Eat Space and Time." They acted as scientific and technical advisors and received screen credits for the Clint Eastwood movie Firefox, designing special effects for all the scenes after Eastwood entered the Firefox cockpit. They also acted as scientific and technical advisors and received screen credits for Douglas Trumbull's movie Brainstorm, starring Christopher Walken and Natalie Wood.

In 1988, Shaw and Pearson released Life Extension, the Video, produced by Ray Schwartz. In the same year they co-authored with Steve Sharon The Dead Pool, a high-tech thriller, which was sold to Warner Bros. and made into a movie, once again starring Clint Eastwood.

== Works ==
=== Books ===
- Life Extension: A Practical Scientific Approach (ISBN 0-446-51229-X, Warner Books, 1982),
- The Life Extension Companion (Warner Books),
- The Life Extension Weight Loss Program (Warner Books)
- Freedom of Informed Choice: FDA v. Nutrient Supplements, (Common Sense Press, 1993).

=== Articles ===
Shaw and Durk Pearson have co-authored numerous articles on life extension, cognitive enhancement, anti-aging, weight loss, and other aspects of nutrition. They produced the Durk Pearson & Sandy Shaw Life Extension News, published as a feature of Life Enhancement Magazine.
