= Greg Bear bibliography =

Greg Bear was an extensively published science fiction writer. His bibliography includes a number of well-known series.

== Bibliography ==
=== Novels ===
==== Series ====
Darwin

- Darwin's Radio (1999)
- Darwin's Children (2003)

The Forge of God

- The Forge of God (1987)
- Anvil of Stars (1992)

Songs of Earth and Power

- The Infinity Concerto (1984)
- The Serpent Mage (1986)
- Songs of Earth and Power (1994 – combines The Infinity Concerto and The Serpent Mage)

Quantico

- Quantico (2005)
- Mariposa (2009)

Quantum Logic

Novels in internal chronology:

- Queen of Angels (1990)
- Slant (1997)
- Heads (1990)
- Moving Mars (1993)

War dogs

- War dogs. Orbit. 2014.
- Killing Titan (2015)
- Take Back the Sky (2016)

The Way

- Eon (1985)
- Eternity (1988)
- Legacy (1995)
- The Way of All Ghosts (1999)

==== Series (non-originating author) ====
The Foundation Series

- Foundation and Chaos (1998) (Second Foundation series: book 2)

Man-Kzin Wars

- The Man Who Would Be Kzin (with S. M. Stirling) (1991)

Halo

- Forerunner Saga (trilogy)
  - Halo: Cryptum (2011)
  - Halo: Primordium (2012)
  - Halo: Silentium (2013)

Star Trek: The Original Series

- Corona (1984)

Star Wars

- Rogue Planet (2000)

Foreworld Saga

- The Mongoliad (2012–2013)

==== Non-series ====
- Hegira (1979)
- Psychlone (1979)
- Beyond Heaven's River (1980)
- Strength of Stones (1981)
- Hardfought (1983)
- Blood Music (1985)
- Dinosaur Summer (1998)
- Vitals (2002)
- Dead Lines (2004)
- City at the End of Time (Gollancz edition published July 17, 2008; Del Rey Books edition August 2008)
- Hull Zero Three (2010)
- The Unfinished Land (2021)

=== Short fiction ===
Uncollected short fiction

- Destroyers (1967)
- Sun Planet (1977)
- If I Die Before I Wake (1980)
- Eucharist (1981)
- RAM Shift Phase 2 (2005)
- Object 00922UU (2015) (with Erik Bear)
- The Machine Starts (2015)

Collections

- The Wind from a Burning Woman (1983, vt The Venging 1992)
- Early Harvest (February 1988)
- Tangents (1989)
- Bear's Fantasies (1992)
- The Venging (collects The Wind from a Burning Woman, The Venging, and Perihesperon) (1992)
- The White Horse Child (1993)
- The Collected Stories of Greg Bear (2002)
- W3: Women in Deep Time (2003)
- Sleepside: The Collected Fantasies (November 2005)
- Just Over the Horizon: The Complete Short Fiction of Greg Bear Book 1 (2016)
- Far Thoughts and Pale Gods: The Complete Short Fiction of Greg Bear Book 2 (2016)
- Beyond the Farthest Suns: The Complete Short Fiction of Greg Bear Book 3 (2016)
