= John W. Campbell Memorial Award for Best Science Fiction Novel =

Science fiction literary award

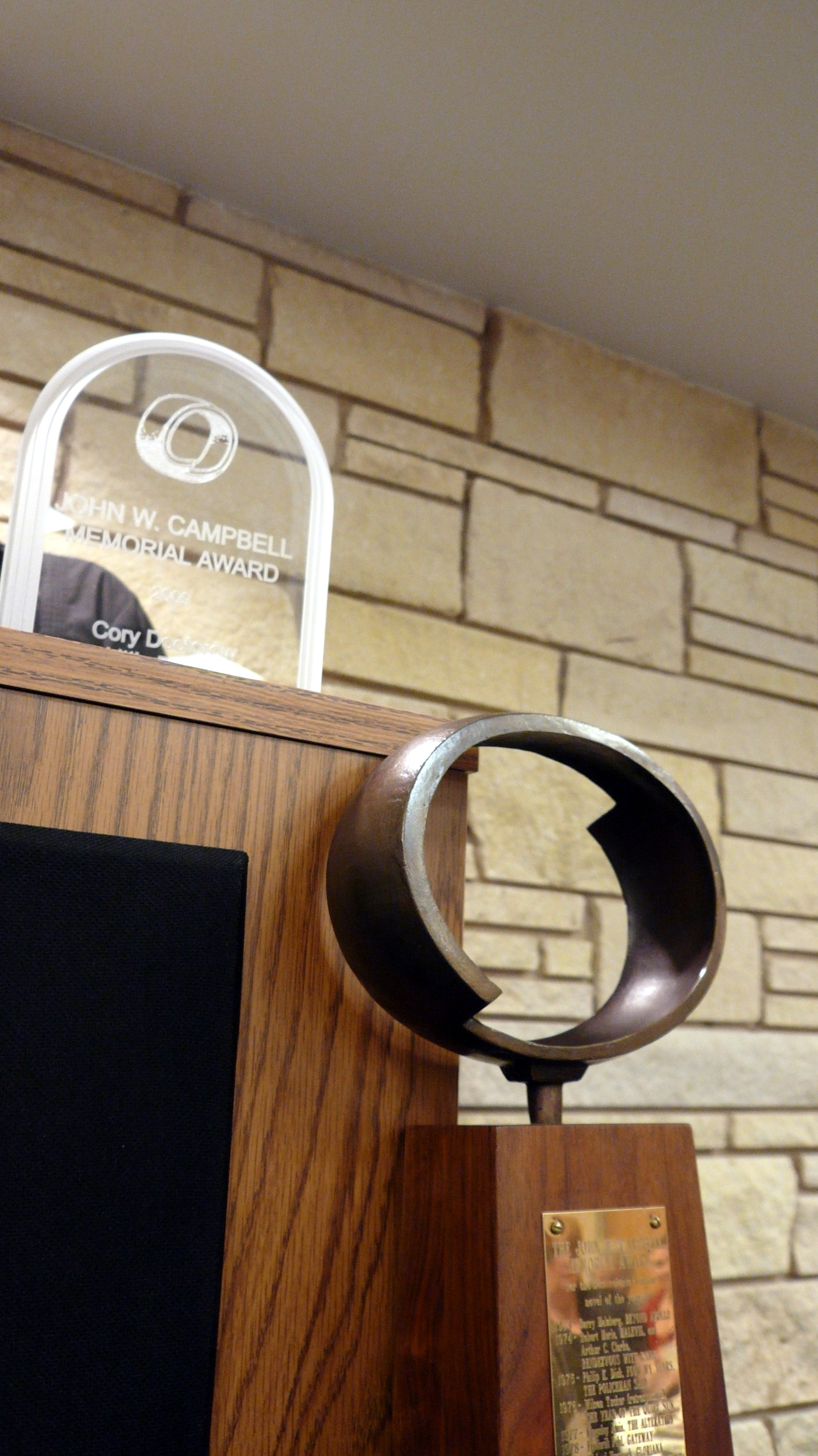
- The permanent trophy of the Campbell Memorial Award and one of the personalized trophies given in 2009
- Awarded for: The best science fiction novel published in English in the previous calendar year
- Presented by: Various
- First award: 1973
- Final award: 2019

The John W. Campbell Memorial Award for Best Science Fiction Novel, or Campbell Memorial Award, was an annual award presented to the author of the best science fiction novel published in English in the preceding calendar year. It was given by several organizations from 1973 to 1979 and then by the Center for the Study of Science Fiction at the University of Kansas until 2019. It was the novel counterpart of the Theodore Sturgeon Award for best short story, awarded at the same conference by the Theodore Sturgeon Literary Trust. The award was named in honor of John W. Campbell (1910–1971), whose science fiction writing and role as editor of Analog Science Fiction and Fact made him one of the most influential editors in the early history of science fiction. The award was established in 1973 by writers and critics Harry Harrison and Brian Aldiss "as a way of continuing his efforts to encourage writers to produce their best possible work." Locus magazine listed it as one of the "major awards" of written science fiction.

The winning novel was selected by a panel of science fiction experts, intended to be "small enough to discuss among its members all of the nominated novels". Among members of the panel have been Gregory Benford, Paul A. Carter, James Gunn, Elizabeth Anne Hull, Christopher McKitterick, Farah Mendlesohn, Pamela Sargent, and Tom Shippey. In 2008 Mendlesohn was replaced with Paul Kincaid, in 2009 Carter left the panel while Paul Di Filippo and Sheila Finch joined, and Lisa Yaszek replaced Di Filippo in 2016. Nominations were submitted by publishers and jurors, and collated by the panel into a list of finalists to be voted on. The minimum eligible length that a work may be was not formally defined by the center. The winner was selected by May of each year, and was for a number of years presented during the Campbell Conference awards banquet in Lawrence as part of the centerpiece of the conference along with the Sturgeon Award. The award was given at this conference since 1979; prior to then it was awarded at various locations around the world, starting at the Illinois Institute of Technology in 1973. Winners were invited to attend the ceremony. James Gunn maintained a trophy which records all of the winners on engraved plaques affixed to the sides, and since 2004 winners received a smaller personalized trophy as well. In 2019, McKitterick, then the award's chair, announced plans to rename the conference and the award following the example of the Campbell Award for Best New Writer. Both the conference and the award were cancelled in 2020 and 2021 due to the COVID-19 pandemic and did not resume.

During the 47 years the award was active, 183 authors had works nominated; 47 of these authors won. In two years, 1976 and 1994, the panel selected none of the nominees as a winner, while in 1974, 2002, 2009, and 2012 the panel selected two winners rather than one. Frederik Pohl and Joan Slonczewski each won twice, the only authors to do so, out of four and two nominations, respectively. Kim Stanley Robinson and Paul J. McAuley won once out of seven nominations, and Jack McDevitt, Ian McDonald, Adam Roberts, and Robert J. Sawyer won once out of five nominations, while Nancy Kress, Bruce Sterling, and Robert Charles Wilson won once out of four nominations. Greg Bear had the most nominations without winning at nine, followed by Sheri S. Tepper at six, James K. Morrow at five, and William Gibson, Ken MacLeod, Charles Stross, and Peter Watts at four.

== Winners and nominees ==
In the following table, the years correspond to the date of the ceremony, rather than when the novel was first published. Each year links to the corresponding "year in literature". Entries with a yellow background and an asterisk (*) next to the writer's name have won the award; the other entries are the other nominees on the shortlist. Entries with a gray background and a plus sign (+) indicate a year where no novel was selected as the winner.

* Winners
+ No winner selected

Winners and nominees
Year	Author	Novel	Publisher	Ref.
1973	Barry N. Malzberg*	Beyond Apollo	Random House	
1973	James E. Gunn	The Listeners	Charles Scribner's Sons	
1973	Christopher Priest	Fugue for a Darkening Island	Harper & Row	
1974	Robert Merle*	Malevil	Simon & Schuster	
1974	Arthur C. Clarke*	Rendezvous with Rama	Harcourt Brace Jovanovich	
1974	Ian Watson	The Embedding	Hodder & Stoughton	
1974	Peter Dickinson	The Green Gene	Anchor Books	
1975	Philip K. Dick*	Flow My Tears, the Policeman Said	Doubleday	
1975	Ursula K. Le Guin	The Dispossessed	Harper & Row	
1976	(no award)+			
1976	Robert Silverberg	The Stochastic Man	Harper & Row	
1976	Bob Shaw	Orbitsville	Victor Gollancz Ltd	
1977	Kingsley Amis*	The Alteration	Viking Press	
1977	Frederik Pohl	Man Plus	Random House	
1977	Kate Wilhelm	Where Late the Sweet Birds Sang	Harper & Row	
1978	Frederik Pohl*	Gateway	St. Martin's Press	
1978	Arkady and Boris Strugatsky	Roadside Picnic and Tale of the Troika	Macmillan Publishers	
1978	Philip K. Dick	A Scanner Darkly	Doubleday	
1979	Michael Moorcock*	Gloriana	Avon Publications	
1979	Paddy Chayefsky	Altered States	Harper & Row	
1979	Donald R. Bensen	And Having Writ...	Bobbs-Merrill Company	
1980	Thomas M. Disch*	On Wings of Song	St. Martin's Press	
1980	John Crowley	Engine Summer	Doubleday	
1980	J. G. Ballard	The Unlimited Dream Company	Holt, Rinehart & Winston	
1981	Gregory Benford*	Timescape	Simon & Schuster	
1981	Damien Broderick	The Dreaming Dragons	Pocket Books	
1981	Gene Wolfe	The Shadow of the Torturer	Simon & Schuster	
1982	Russell Hoban*	Riddley Walker	Jonathan Cape	
1983	Brian W. Aldiss*	Helliconia Spring	Atheneum Books	
1983	Michael Bishop	No Enemy But Time	Timescape	
1984	Gene Wolfe*	The Citadel of the Autarch	Timescape	
1984	John Batchelor	The Birth of the People's Republic of Antarctica	Dial Press	
1984	John Sladek	Tik-Tok	Victor Gollancz Ltd	
1985	Frederik Pohl*	The Years of the City	Timescape	
1985	Lucius Shepard	Green Eyes	Ace Books	
1985	William Gibson	Neuromancer	Ace Books	
1986	David Brin*	The Postman	Bantam Spectra	
1986	Kurt Vonnegut	Galápagos	Delacorte Press	
1986	Greg Bear	Blood Music	Arbor House	
1986	Keith Roberts	Kiteworld	Victor Gollancz Ltd	
1987	Joan Slonczewski*	A Door into Ocean	Arbor House	
1987	James K. Morrow	This Is the Way the World Ends	Henry Holt and Company	
1987	Orson Scott Card	Speaker for the Dead	Tor Books	
1988	Connie Willis*	Lincoln's Dreams	Bantam Spectra	
1988	George Turner	The Sea and Summer	Faber and Faber	
1988	Geoff Ryman	The Unconquered Country	Bantam Spectra	
1989	Bruce Sterling*	Islands in the Net	Arbor House	
1989	Kim Stanley Robinson	The Gold Coast	Tor Books	
1989	Anne McCaffrey	Dragonsdawn	Del Rey Books	
1990	Geoff Ryman*	The Child Garden	Unwin Hyman	
1990	K. W. Jeter	Farewell Horizontal	St. Martin's Press	
1990	John Kessel	Good News From Outer Space	Tor Books	
1991	Kim Stanley Robinson*	Pacific Edge	Tor Books	
1991	Greg Bear	Queen of Angels	Questar Science Fiction	
1991	James K. Morrow	Only Begotten Daughter	William Morrow and Company	
1992	Bradley Denton*	Buddy Holly Is Alive and Well on Ganymede	William Morrow and Company	
1992	William Gibson	The Difference Engine	Bantam Spectra	
1992	Bruce Sterling	The Difference Engine	Bantam Spectra	
1992	Charles Platt	The Silicon Man	William Morrow and Company	
1992	Michael Swanwick	Stations of the Tide	William Morrow and Company	
1992	Eleanor Arnason	A Woman of the Iron People	William Morrow and Company	
1993	Charles Sheffield*	Brother to Dragons	Baen Books	
1993	Sheri S. Tepper	Sideshow	Bantam Spectra	
1993	Vernor Vinge	A Fire Upon the Deep	Tor Books	
1994	(no award)+			
1994	Nancy Kress	Beggars in Spain	Morrow AvoNova	
1994	Greg Bear	Moving Mars	Tor Books	
1995	Greg Egan*	Permutation City	Millennium	
1995	Michael Bishop	Brittle Innings	Bantam Books	
1996	Stephen Baxter*	The Time Ships	HarperCollins	
1996	Neal Stephenson	The Diamond Age	Bantam Spectra	
1996	Ian McDonald	Chaga	Victor Gollancz Ltd	
1997	Paul J. McAuley*	Fairyland	Victor Gollancz Ltd	
1997	Kim Stanley Robinson	Blue Mars	HarperCollins Voyager	
1997	Mary Doria Russell	The Sparrow	Villard	
1998	Joe Haldeman*	Forever Peace	Ace Books	
1998	Greg Bear	Slant	Tor Books	
1998	Paul Preuss	Secret Passages	Tor Books	
1999	George Zebrowski*	Brute Orbits	HarperPrism	
1999	Poul Anderson	Starfarers	Tor Books	
1999	Bruce Sterling	Distraction	Bantam Spectra	
2000	Vernor Vinge*	A Deepness in the Sky	Tor Books	
2000	Greg Bear	Darwin's Radio	Del Rey Books	
2000	Norman Spinrad	Greenhouse Summer	Tor Books	
2000	Jack Williamson	The Silicon Dagger	Tor Books	
2000	Peter Watts	Starfish	Tor Books	
2001	Poul Anderson*	Genesis	Tor Books	
2001	Mary Gentle	Ash: A Secret History	Victor Gollancz Ltd	
2001	Robert J. Sawyer	Calculating God	Tor Books	
2001	Jack McDevitt	Infinity Beach	HarperPrism	
2001	Sheri S. Tepper	The Fresco	Eos	
2002	Robert Charles Wilson*	The Chronoliths	Tor Books	
2002	Jack Williamson*	Terraforming Earth	Tor Books	
2002	Nancy Kress	Probability Sun	Tor Books	
2002	Ken MacLeod	Dark Light	Orbit Books	
2002	Jack McDevitt	Deepsix	Eos	
2002	Peter F. Hamilton	Fallen Dragon	Macmillan Publishers	
2002	C. J. Cherryh	Hammerfall	Eos	
2002	Paul Johnston	The House of Dust	Hodder & Stoughton	
2002	Scott Mackay	The Meek	Roc Books	
2002	Maureen F. McHugh	Nekropolis	Eos	
2002	Jon Courtenay Grimwood	Pashazade: The First Arabesk	Earthlight	
2002	Connie Willis	Passage	Bantam Books	
2003	Nancy Kress*	Probability Space	Tor Books	
2003	David Brin	Kiln People	Tor Books	
2003	Robert J. Sawyer	Hominids	Tor Books	
2003	Michael Swanwick	Bones of the Earth	Eos	
2003	Brian Stableford	Dark Ararat	Tor Books	
2003	John C. Wright	The Golden Age	Tor Books	
2003	Steven Barnes	Lion's Blood	Warner Aspect	
2003	Christopher Priest	The Separation	Charles Scribner's Sons	
2003	Sheri S. Tepper	The Visitor	Eos	
2003	Greg Bear	Vitals	Del Rey Books	
2004	Jack McDevitt*	Omega	Ace Books	
2004	Justina Robson	Natural History	Macmillan Publishers	
2004	Philip Baruth	The X President	Bantam Books	
2004	Kay Kenyon	The Braided World	Bantam Books	
2004	Syne Mitchell	The Changeling Plague	Roc Books	
2004	Sheri S. Tepper	The Companions	Eos	
2004	Greg Bear	Darwin's Children	Del Rey Books	
2004	Max Barry	Jennifer Government	Doubleday	
2004	Linda Nagata	Memory	Tor Books	
2004	John Varley	Red Thunder	Ace Books	
2004	Robert Reed	Sister Alice	Orbit Books	
2004	Mike Brotherton	Star Dragon	Tor Books	
2004	Amy Thomson	Storyteller	Ace Books	
2004	James Lovegrove	Untied Kingdom	Victor Gollancz Ltd	
2004	Michael F. Flynn	The Wreck of the River of Stars	Tor Books	
2005	Richard Morgan*	Market Forces	Victor Gollancz Ltd	
2005	Geoff Ryman	Air	St. Martin's Griffin	
2005	Audrey Niffenegger	The Time Traveler's Wife	MacAdam/Cage	
2005	Frederik Pohl	The Boy Who Would Live Forever	Tor Books	
2005	Louise Marley	The Child Goddess	Ace Books	
2005	Karen Traviss	City of Pearl	Eos	
2005	John Barnes	Gaudeamus	Tor Books	
2005	Ken MacLeod	Newton's Wake	Tor Books	
2005	Philip Roth	The Plot Against America	Houghton Mifflin Harcourt	
2005	Jack Dann	The Rebel	William Morrow and Company	
2005	Robert Reed	The Well of Stars	Orbit Books	
2005	Paul J. McAuley	White Devils	Simon & Schuster	
2006	Robert J. Sawyer*	Mindscan	Tor Books	
2006	Robert Charles Wilson	Spin	Tor Books	
2006	Ian R. MacLeod	The Summer Isles	Aio Publishing	
2006	Charles Stross	Accelerando	Ace Books	
2006	David Gerrold	Child of Earth	BenBella Books	
2006	David Marusek	Counting Heads	Tor Books	
2006	Ken MacLeod	Learning the World	Tor Books	
2006	Steve Cash	The Meq	Tor Books	
2006	Paul J. McAuley	Mind's Eye	Simon & Schuster	
2006	Jack McDevitt	Seeker	Ace Books	
2006	Stephen Baxter	Transcendent	Victor Gollancz Ltd	
2006	Karen Traviss	The World Before	Eos	
2007	Ben Bova*	Titan	Tor Books	
2007	James K. Morrow	The Last Witchfinder	William Morrow and Company	
2007	Peter Watts	Blindsight	Tor Books	
2007	Jo Walton	Farthing	Tor Books	
2007	Barbara Sapergia	Dry	Coteau Books	
2007	Charles Stross	Glasshouse	Ace Books	
2007	David Louis Edelman	Infoquake	Pyr	
2007	Justina Robson	Living Next Door to the God of Love	Tor Books	
2007	M. John Harrison	Nova Swing	Victor Gollancz Ltd	
2007	Jack McDevitt	Odyssey	Ace Books	
2007	Vernor Vinge	Rainbows End	Tor Books	
2007	Nick DiChario	A Small and Remarkable Life	Robert J. Sawyer Books	
2007	Karl Schroeder	Sun of Suns	Tor Books	
2008	Kathleen Ann Goonan*	In War Times	Tor Books	
2008	Michael Chabon	The Yiddish Policemen's Union	HarperCollins	
2008	Ken MacLeod	The Execution Channel	Tor Books	
2008	Robert Charles Wilson	Axis	Tor Books	
2008	Matt Ruff	Bad Monkeys	HarperCollins	
2008	Ian McDonald	Brasyl	Pyr	
2008	Jeffrey Thomas	Deadstock	Solaris Books	
2008	Brian W. Aldiss	HARM	Del Rey Books	
2008	Jay Lake	Mainspring	Tor Books	
2008	Sheri S. Tepper	The Margarets	Eos	
2008	Nalo Hopkinson	The New Moon's Arms	Warner	
2008	Robert J. Sawyer	Rollback	Tor Books	
2008	Rebecca Ore	Time's Child	Eos	
2008	José Carlos Somoza	Zig Zag	Rayo	
2009	Cory Doctorow*	Little Brother	Tor Books	
2009	Ian R. MacLeod*	Song of Time	PS Publishing	
2009	James K. Morrow	The Philosopher's Apprentice	William Morrow and Company	
2009	Neal Stephenson	Anathem	William Morrow and Company	
2009	Greg Bear	City at the End of Time	Del Rey Books	
2009	Nick DiChario	Valley of Day-Glo	Robert J. Sawyer Books	
2010	Paolo Bacigalupi*	The Windup Girl	Night Shade Books	
2010	Robert Charles Wilson	Julian Comstock: A Story of 22nd-Century America	Tor Books	
2010	China Miéville	The City & the City	Del Rey Books	
2010	Bruce Sterling	The Caryatids	Del Rey Books	
2010	Kim Stanley Robinson	Galileo's Dream	Ballantine Spectra	
2010	Paul J. McAuley	Gardens of the Sun	Pyr	
2010	Cory Doctorow	Makers	Tor Books	
2010	Nancy Kress	Steal Across the Sky	Tor Books	
2010	Iain M. Banks	Transition	Orbit Books	
2010	Robert J. Sawyer	WWW: Wake	Ace Books	
2010	Margaret Atwood	The Year of the Flood	Nan A. Talese	
2010	Adam Roberts	Yellow Blue Tibia	Victor Gollancz Ltd	
2011	Ian McDonald*	The Dervish House	Victor Gollancz Ltd	
2011	Charles Yu	How to Live Safely in a Science Fictional Universe	Pantheon Books	
2011	Hannu Rajaniemi	The Quantum Thief	Victor Gollancz Ltd	
2011	E. O. Wilson	Anthill	W. W. Norton & Company	
2011	Jean-Christophe Valtat	Aurorarama	Melville House Publishing	
2011	Connie Willis	Blackout/All Clear	Bantam Spectra	
2011	Tom McCarthy	C	Alfred A. Knopf	
2011	Greg Bear	Hull Zero Three	Orbit Books	
2011	Adam Roberts	New Model Army	Victor Gollancz Ltd	
2011	Gavin Smith	Veteran	Victor Gollancz Ltd	
2011	Sheri S. Tepper	The Waters Rising	Eos	
2011	Jon Armstrong	Yarn	Night Shade Books	
2011	William Gibson	Zero History	Putnam Publishing Group	
2012	Christopher Priest*	The Islanders	Victor Gollancz Ltd	
2012	Joan Slonczewski*	The Highest Frontier	Tor Books	
2012	China Miéville	Embassytown	Del Rey Books	
2012	Lavie Tidhar	Osama	PS Publishing	
2012	Ernest Cline	Ready Player One	Crown Publishing Group	
2012	Kathleen Ann Goonan	This Shared Dream	Tor Books	
2012	Will McIntosh	Soft Apocalypse	Night Shade Books	
2012	Michael Swanwick	Dancing with Bears	Night Shade Books	
2012	Daniel H. Wilson	Robopocalypse	Simon & Schuster	
2012	Gene Wolfe	Home Fires	Tor Books	
2012	Rob Ziegler	Seed	Night Shade Books	
2013	Adam Roberts*	Jack Glass: The Story of a Murderer	Victor Gollancz Ltd	
2013	Iain M. Banks	The Hydrogen Sonata	Orbit Books	
2013	Terry Bisson	Any Day Now	The Overlook Press	
2013	David Brin	Existence	Tor Books	
2013	Cory Doctorow and Charles Stross	The Rapture of the Nerds	Tor Books	
2013	M. John Harrison	Empty Space	Victor Gollancz Ltd, Night Shade Books	
2013	Ken MacLeod	Intrusion	Orbit Books	
2013	China Miéville	Railsea	Del Rey Books	
2013	Hannu Rajaniemi	The Fractal Prince	Victor Gollancz Ltd, Tor Books	
2013	Alastair Reynolds	Blue Remembered Earth	Ace Books	
2013	Kim Stanley Robinson	2312	Orbit Books	
2013	John Varley	Slow Apocalypse	Ace Books	
2013	G. Willow Wilson	Alif the Unseen	Grove Press	
2014	Marcel Theroux*	Strange Bodies	Faber and Faber	
2014	Max Barry	Lexicon	Penguin Group	
2014	Stephen Baxter	Proxima	Victor Gollancz Ltd	
2014	Dave Eggers	The Circle	Alfred A. Knopf	
2014	Karen Joy Fowler	We Are All Completely Beside Ourselves	Marian Wood	
2014	Nicola Griffith	Hild	Farrar, Straus and Giroux	
2014	Wolfgang Jeschke	The Cusanus Game	Tor Books	
2014	Ann Leckie	Ancillary Justice	Orbit Books	
2014	Phillip Mann	The Disestablishment of Paradise	Victor Gollancz Ltd	
2014	Paul J. McAuley	Evening's Empires	Victor Gollancz Ltd	
2014	Linda Nagata	The Red: First Light	Mythic Island Press	
2014	Christopher Priest	The Adjacent	Victor Gollancz Ltd	
2014	Alastair Reynolds	On the Steel Breeze	Victor Gollancz Ltd	
2014	Kim Stanley Robinson	Shaman	Orbit Books	
2014	Charles Stross	Neptune's Brood	Ace Books	
2015	Claire North*	The First Fifteen Lives of Harry August	Redhook Books	
2015	Nina Allan	The Race	Newcon Press	
2015	James L. Cambias	A Darkling Sea	Tor Books	
2015	William Gibson	The Peripheral	G. P. Putnam's Sons	
2015	Daryl Gregory	Afterparty	Tor Books	
2015	Dave Hutchinson	Europe In Autumn	Solaris Books	
2015	Simon Ings	Wolves	Victor Gollancz Ltd	
2015	Cixin Liu	The Three-Body Problem	Tor Books	
2015	Emily St. John Mandel	Station Eleven	Alfred A. Knopf	
2015	Will McIntosh	Defenders	Orbit Books	
2015	Laline Paull	The Bees	Ecco Press	
2015	Adam Roberts	Bête	Victor Gollancz Ltd	
2015	John Scalzi	Lock In	Tor Books	
2015	Andy Weir	The Martian	Broadway Books	
2015	Jeff VanderMeer	Annihilation	FSG Originals	
2015	Peter Watts	Echopraxia	Tor Books	
2016	Eleanor Lerman*	Radiomen	Permanent Press	
2016	Kim Stanley Robinson	Aurora	Orbit Books	
2016	Nnedi Okorafor	The Book of Phoenix	DAW Books	
2016	Dave Hutchinson	Europe at Midnight	Solaris Books	
2016	James K. Morrow	Galapágos Regained	St. Martin's Press	
2016	Linda Nagata	Going Dark	Mythic Island Press, Saga Press	
2016	Ian McDonald	Luna: New Moon	Victor Gollancz Ltd, Tor Books	
2016	Neal Stephenson	Seveneves	William Morrow and Company, HarperCollins	
2016	Adam Roberts	The Thing Itself	Victor Gollancz Ltd	
2016	Paolo Bacigalupi	The Water Knife	Orbit Books, Alfred A. Knopf	
2016	Kit Reed	Where	Tor Books	
2017	Lavie Tidhar*	Central Station	Tachyon Publications	
2017	Rick Wilber	Alien Morning	Tor Books	
2017	Aliya Whiteley	The Arrival of Missives	Unsung Stories	
2017	Nick Wood	Azanian Bridges	NewCon Press	
2017	Kij Johnson	The Dream-Quest of Vellitt Boe	Tor.com Publishing	
2017	Nisi Shawl	Everfair	Tor Books	
2017	Paul J. McAuley	Into Everywhere	Victor Gollancz Ltd	
2017	Stephen Baxter	The Medusa Chronicles	Saga Press	
2017	Alastair Reynolds	The Medusa Chronicles	Saga Press	
2017	Tricia Sullivan	Occupy Me	Victor Gollancz Ltd	
2017	Tade Thompson	Rosewater	Apex Publications	
2017	Ben H. Winters	Underground Airlines	Mulholland Books	
2017	Colson Whitehead	The Underground Railroad	Doubleday	
2017	Don DeLillo	Zero K	Charles Scribner's Sons	
2018	David Walton*	The Genius Plague	Pyr	
2018	Deji Bryce Olukotun	After the Flare	Unnamed Press	
2018	Paul J. McAuley	Austral	Victor Gollancz Ltd	
2018	Annalee Newitz	Autonomous	Tor Books	
2018	Jeff VanderMeer	Borne	MCD	
2018	Louise Erdrich	Future Home of the Living God	Harper	
2018	John Kessel	The Moon and the Other	Saga Press	
2018	Kim Stanley Robinson	New York 2140	Orbit Books	
2018	Norman Spinrad	The People's Police	Tor Books	
2018	Nina Allan	The Rift	Titan Books	
2018	Eleanor Lerman	The Stargazer's Embassy	Mayapple Press	
2018	Kameron Hurley	The Stars Are Legion	Saga Press	
2018	Christopher Brown	Tropic of Kansas	HarperCollins	
2019	Sam J. Miller*	Blackfish City	Ecco Press	
2019	Mary Robinette Kowal	The Calculating Stars	Tor Books	
2019	Peter Watts	The Freeze-Frame Revolution	Tachyon Publications	
2019	Aliya Whiteley	The Loosening Skin	Unsung Stories	
2019	Waubgeshig Rice	Moon of the Crusted Snow	ECW Press	
2019	Sue Burke	Semiosis	Tor Books	
2019	Catherynne M. Valente	Space Opera	Saga Press	
2019	Imraan Coovadia	A Spy in Time	Rare Bird Books	
2019	Audrey Schulman	Theory of Bastards	Europa Editions	
2019	Ian McDonald	Time Was	Tor.com	
2019	Lavie Tidhar	Unholy Land	Tachyon Publications	
