= Mariposa (novel) =

2009 novel by Greg Bear

- First edition
- Author: Greg Bear
- Language: English
- Genre: Science fiction novel
- Publisher: Vanguard Press
- Publication date: 2009
- Publication place: United States
- Media type: Print (Paperback)
- Pages: 380 pp
- Preceded by: Quantico
- Followed by: Queen of Angels

Mariposa (2009) is a science fiction novel written by Greg Bear as both a sequel to Quantico and a prequel to Queen of Angels, featuring characters from both earlier works. Set in 2021 America, whose government is more than fifty trillion dollars in debt, the novel follows an FBI investigation of the Talos Corporation (a thinly disguised Blackwater) which plans to disable the power grid across the entire Eastern seaboard in a simultaneous, coordinated attack of domestic terrorism, which will trigger the provisions of a law Congress passed authorizing Federal lands and resources as collateral to continue borrowing funds from overseas. Unexpected help comes from a secret weapon in the Federal arsenal, non-nuclear EMP, as well as a mute Mind Design proto-AI named Jones, early precursor to Jill, who has a back door into Talos.

Mariposa is the missing link that ties Quantico (2005) together with the novels Queen of Angels (1990), "/" - also known as Slant - (1997), Heads (1990), and Moving Mars (1993) into a single unified future history. Green Idaho has seceded from the Union. Mary Choi, the protagonist of Queen of Angels and / appears as an orphan of age two. President Raphkind comes to power, beginning an administration that is still reviled by the time of Queen of Angels in 2047.

== Reviews ==
- Review by Gary K. Wolfe (2010) in Locus, #588 January 2010
