= City at the End of Time =

2008 novel by Greg Bear

- UK first edition
- Author: Greg Bear
- Language: English
- Genre: Science fiction
- Publisher: Del Rey (US); Gollancz (UK)
- Publication date: August 2008
- Publication place: United States
- Media type: Print, e-book
- Pages: 496
- ISBN: 0-345-44839-1 (US); 0-575-08188-0 (UK)

City at the End of Time is a 2008 science fiction novel by American writer Greg Bear. It was published in August 2008 by Del Rey in the United States, and Gollancz in the United Kingdom. The story follows three drifters in present-day Seattle who are tormented by strange dreams of the Kalpa, a city one hundred trillion years in the future. The Kalpa is attempting to ward off the Typhon, an inexplicable entity that has consumed the rest of the ancient universe and broken down the laws of physics.

The novel belongs to the Dying Earth subgenre. It is rooted in hard science fiction, but also incorporates several other genres, including fantasy and horror. Bear called it science fiction "stretched to the nth degree". He said that in the novel he honors those writers who changed the face of science fiction and fantasy, including William Hope Hodgson and Arthur C. Clarke, and pays homage to Hodgson's 1912 novel, The Night Land, with which City at the End of Time shares a number of plot elements.

The novel received a mixed reception from critics. Some reviewers were impressed by the novel's scope and grandiosity, while others felt that the characters were underdeveloped and the story was difficult to follow. New Scientist described the first half of the book as "a gripping, original tale", but complained that in the second half Bear over-complicates the story with "too many ideas, images, mythologies and distractions". City at the End of Time was nominated for the Locus Award for Best Science Fiction Novel and the John W. Campbell Memorial Award in 2009.

== Plot summary ==
City at the End of Time is about the Kalpa, the last city on Earth, one hundred trillion years in the future. The novel's backstory describes how the aging universe continued expanding and its spacetime fabric weakened. With the galaxies burnt out, humanity dispersed across the cosmos, where they encountered the Typhon, an inexplicable entity that was destroying the decaying universe. It consumed matter and replaced space-time with emptiness and inconsistencies beyond the laws of physics. The resulting Chaos spread rapidly, driving some humans back to ancient Earth with its rekindled sun. In an attempt to fend off the approaching Typhon, leaders of the dying Earth sent for Polybiblios, a human living with the Shen, an ancient alien race. Polybiblios returned to Earth with his adopted daughter, Ishanaxade, a being he had constructed from "fate-logs" of intelligent species collected by the Shen. After the Shen system fell, and the Chaos surrounded Earth, its leaders instructed everybody to convert themselves from primordial (real) matter to noötic (virtual) mass. As each city fell, its inhabitants retreated to the last remaining cities, the Kalpa and Nataraja. Using knowledge he had gleaned from the Shen, Polybiblios built reality generators to protect the Kalpa. Nataraja, which had rebelled against the instruction to convert to noötic matter, was left to fend for itself.

The novel alternates between the Kalpa and present-day Seattle, where three drifters, Ginny, Jack and Daniel are in possession of sum-runners, small stone-like talismans that give them "fate-shifting" abilities, whereby they can jump between fate-lines (world lines in a multiverse). Ginny and Jack also have disturbing dreams of the Kalpa, and are inexplicably connected to Jebrassy and Taidba, two "breeds" living in the future city. Fate-shifters and their sum-runners are hunted by "collectors" working for the Chalk Princess, an entity controlled by the Typhon from the future. These hunters place adverts in local newspapers inviting "dreamers" to contact them for "help".

"Do you dream of a city at the end of time?"

— Seattle newspaper ad.

In the future, the Typhon is destroying history and world-lines are being broken, merging the past and the present. With the Chaos closing in on the Kalpa, the inhabitants (all noötic) are unable to venture outside the city walls. Under Ishanaxade's instructions, they create "breeds", copies of ancient humans, using primordial matter. They send them in groups into the Chaos to find out if Nataraja still stands, but none return. Ishanaxade herself ventures out, but is not heard from again. As the Typhon starts breaching the Kalpa, the last batch of breeds, including Jebrassy and Taidba, leave the city in search of help. Armed with portable reality generators, they slowly progress through the unreal landscape in search of the rebel city.

Meanwhile, the Chaos has reached all the way back to the present day, and an event called the Terminus hits Seattle: the past, present and future collide and world-lines are severed. Ginny, Jack and Daniel, having evaded the hunters, trek across a degenerating Seattle. Protected by their sum-runners, they are drawn to Nataraja, where Ishanaxade is waiting. While still in the Kalpa, Ishanaxade had instructed Polybiblios to create the sum-runners containing "fragmented Babels", and in the Chaos she had sent them back to the "beginning of time". The sum-runners were programmed to lead the bearers to Ishanaxade when the expected Terminus occurred. The breeds, programmed to see Ishanaxade as their "mother", are also drawn to Nataraja, and Jebrassy and Taidba find their counterparts Jack and Ginny in the ruined city. The Kalpa falls to the Chaos, but in Nataraja, the sum-runners and their Babel fragments are united and history is recreated, causing the Typhon, now a failed god, to implode.

== Background ==
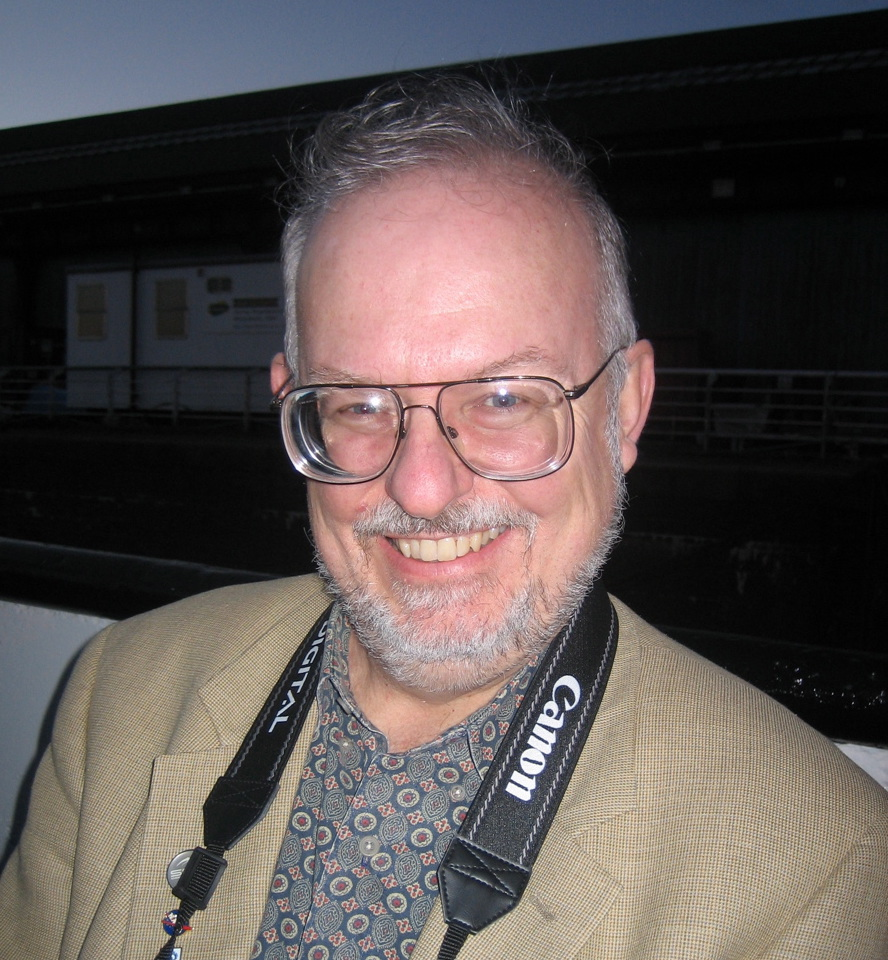
Greg Bear, 2005

Greg Bear is a science fiction writer from Seattle. He has won three Nebula Awards, including the 1995 Award for Best Novel for Moving Mars, and two Hugo Awards, including the 1983 Award for Best Novelette for Blood Music. City at the End of Time was his first novel since Quantico, which was first published in 2005. Bear's early influences included science fiction authors Robert A. Heinlein, Isaac Asimov and Poul Anderson.

Bear called City at the End of Time his "longest and most ambitious science fiction novel" he has written for a while. He said it is a "significant departure" from any of his previous works, and that it has a future history unlike anything he had tackled before. In an interview with Andromeda Spaceways Inflight Magazine in September 2008, Bear said that what inspired him to write City at the End of Time was the question, "What if we're still primitive in our thinking [about physics and cosmology]?", and this led to the idea for a story of "a Universe that goes on and on and on, and how reality might have to be changed by that circumstance."

Bear told Locus magazine in August 2008 that he had found what appears to be a "continuity" in British science fiction: H. G. Wells's The Time Machine (1895), Arthur C. Clarke's The City and the Stars (1956), and Hodgson's The House on the Borderland (1908) and The Night Land (1912), all speculate on the evolution of humankind in the deep future. Bear said that these works, and their author's imagination, were a big influence on City at the End of Time.

== Analysis and genre ==
Science fiction critic John Clute said "City at the End of Time is an example of a novel in dialogue with past works of SF." He said that Bear pays homage to William Hope Hodgson's 1912 novel, The Night Land, with which City at the End of Time shares a number of plot elements. Both books include characters who dream of cities in the far future (the Kalpa, and the Last Redoubt in The Night Land) which are surrounded by encroaching chaos. The Kalpa also draws on Arthur C. Clarke's future city, Diaspar in his 1956 novel, The City and the Stars. Influences of other past works on City at the End of Time include H. P. Lovecraft's novella The Shadow Out of Time (1936), in which people exchange personalities in dreams across time, and Olaf Stapledon's Last and First Men (1930), in which the last of humanity in the deep future mentally contact people from the past. Lovecraft's The Shadow Out of Time was in turn also influenced by The Night Land, which Lovecraft is said to have thought highly of.

Bear admired Hodgson's imagination which, in The Night Land, had created the Last Redoubt as a "technological preserve" in the far future to keep out monsters that humanity had previously created, and which had evolved over long periods of time. But Bear's interpretation of The Night Land is that this future landscape is a "metaphysical place", and the monsters are "not creatures of this Earth". For Bear, this explanation broadens the novel's scope, and opens the door to other interpretations.

Another influence on City at the End of Time are the short stories, "The Universal Library" (1901) by Kurd Lasswitz and "The Library of Babel" (1941) by Jorge Luis Borges, which science fiction and mystery author Peter Heck believes is intentional. Books feature prominently in the novel in both present-day Seattle and the Kalpa in the future, and Heck sees it as "a metaphor that anyone whose life is built around books—whether as a writer, reader, or bookseller—can readily empathize with."

Clute notes that the Kalpa is not, as the title suggests, the last city; they believe they are, but the last city is Nataraja, "the city beyond the city at the end of time". Clute says that the Typhon is "a kind of god and a kind of quasi-animate principle of destruction" that is attempting to destroy the universe because it "cannot tolerate being told" or "observed". The creation and evolution of the universe is observed and recorded, and the Typhon will not tolerate this telling. In the Kalpa, Polybiblios creates Babel fragments ("Borgesian libraries that do not end") that, when brought together, will form a "backstory" that retells the history of the universe and overwhelms the Typhon.

City at the End of Time is rooted in hard science fiction, but includes several other genres. SFF World said the novel is similar to Stephen King's Dark Tower, where "an ultimate destination that defies both space and time are at the heart" of both stories. But whereas King focuses on "fantastical elements", Bear adopts a "scientific approach". SFF World described City at the End of Time as "an Epic Science Fiction novel [with] elements of thriller and horror with some downright creepy characters." Kirkus Reviews called the book an "eschatological fantasy", and science fiction critic Paul Kincaid says the novel has "plotting and language [that] seem to have been borrowed wholesale from fantasy". Bear himself said the novel could be fantasy or horror, but called it science fiction "stretched to the nth degree". City at the End of Time is generally referred to as a "Dying Earth" story, and is categorized under the Dying Earth subgenre.

== Reception ==
A review in Publishers Weekly described City at the End of Time as a "complex, difficult and beautifully written tale [that] will appeal to sophisticated readers who prefer thorny conundrums to fast-paced action". A reviewer for the Library Journal said the novel "plung[es] readers into a visceral experience of cosmological theory and the big creation stories of mythology". A review in New Scientist described the first half of the book as "a gripping, original tale" with the portrayal of the fate-shifters's talents as "nothing short of brilliant", but complained that in the second half Bear over-complicates the story with "too many ideas, images, mythologies and distractions". The reviewer said that a promising story "whips itself up into a virtually incomprehensible final act". Science fiction critic John Clute described the book as "cosmological [science fiction] without a net", and complained that Bear rushes through the story too quickly and does not dwell long enough on locations like the Kalpa to make it memorable. He said that the flight to the future of Ginny, Jack and Daniel "gets a touch Frodo-in-Mordor at places".

Writing in a review in Asimov's Science Fiction, science fiction and mystery author Peter Heck called City at the End of Time a "big, sweeping, heavily symbolic tale", and "one of Bear's most ambitious". He said that while the story could have focused more on the future city, "in the end, the plotlines come together, and the complexities merge into a satisfying unity". Speculative fiction writer Simon Petrie writing in Andromeda Spaceways Inflight Magazine was impressed by the book's "grandiosity to the total synthesis of cosmology and myth", and Bear's "ability to encapsulate a universal future history in just the one book", but found the mix of science, fantasy, horror, mythology and religion a little "incongruous" at times. Petrie also felt that the use of so many "viewpoint characters" results in these characters being underdeveloped, and tends to "[blunt] the pathos as the plot edges towards climax".

In a review in the online speculative fiction magazine Strange Horizons, Tony Keen was critical of Bear's novel, saying that the present and future passages "do not mesh terribly well", and that it is "too long" with "too many ideas". He complained that the book was difficult to follow and that Bear keeps "moving the goalposts as it suits his narrative". Keen said that for a science fiction novel, he was surprised at its "lack of consistency", and called it more a work of fantasy than science fiction. He said the "revelations" at the end still did not help explain what had happened, but that "by this point, it was for me hard to care". A review in the Oakland Tribune complained that Bear, who it felt is not strong on "crafting memorable characters", "struggles" with the novel's multiple viewpoints. The review added that while he "takes a long time to get there, and arrives with a palpable scent of anticlimax, [Bear] does deliver at the end", although with not enough to satisfy the reviewer.

Science fiction critic Paul Kincaid had mixed feelings about the novel. In a review at the SF Site webzine he criticized the characterisation saying that he could not always separate the main characters. Kincaid questioned the need for the supernatural entity, the Typhon, which is never developed. He described the "end of time" sequence as "the most powerful science fictional moment in this entire book", saying that he found it "far more scary, far more gripping, than any supernatural intervention". Kincaid said that while he found the book "ambitious" and "intellectually satisfying", "somehow the whole feels less than the sum of its parts".

In another review at the SF Site, Greg L. Johnson wrote that while City at the End of Time provides plenty of "wonder, awe, and a sense of humanity in the face of an implacable universe", he feels that Bear does not quite succeed with this ambitious story of the fate of reality and the universe at large. Johnson described it as "an immensely complicated story" that unfolds by means of "hints and allusions". He said that even the book's ending only hints at what the gathered role players had achieved. Johnson wrote that while Bear's depictions of events on a grand scale, like the decay of Seattle, are good, his portrayal of the key players against this backdrop is not as strong.

=== Awards and nominations ===
Award	Year	Result
Locus Award for Best Science Fiction Novel	2009	Nominated
John W. Campbell Memorial Award for Best Science Fiction Novel	2009	Nominated
SF Site Best SF and Fantasy Books	2008	Shortlisted
Publishers Weekly Year's Best Books	2008	Selected
