= Quantico =

Quantico may refer to:

== Places in the United States ==
=== Maryland ===
- Quantico, Maryland, an unincorporated community in Wicomico County

=== Virginia ===
- Quantico, Virginia, a town in Stafford County
- Quantico Creek, a tributary of the Potomac River
- Quantico station, a train station in Quantico, Virginia
- Marine Corps Base Quantico, a U.S. Marine Corps training hub
- Quantico National Cemetery, a military cemetery in Triangle, Virginia

== Arts, entertainment, and media ==
- Quantico (novel), a 2005 science fiction novel by Greg Bear
- Quantico (TV series), a 2015 American thriller drama TV series

== Other uses ==
- Quantico, a cultivar of the common fig
