= War Dogs (novel) =

2014 novel by Greg Bear

- First edition cover
- Author: Greg Bear
- Language: English
- Series: War Dogs
- Genre: Science fiction
- Publisher: Orbit Books
- Publication date: 2014
- Publication place: United States
- Media type: Print (Hardcover & Paperback)
- Pages: 291
- ISBN: 9780316072830
- OCLC: 879370656
- Followed by: Killing Titan

War Dogs is a 2014 science fiction novel by Greg Bear, the first in a trilogy chronicling a war between Earth and mysterious alien invaders in the Solar System. After the sequel, Killing Titan was published, War Dogs was re-published as War Dogs: Ares Rising.

== Plot introduction ==
Approximately 30 years before the beginning of the novel, a small group of alien refugees (later termed the "Gurus") landed on Earth and soon made themselves indispensable with their contributions to human technology and scientific understanding. In exchange, they "requested" Earth's help in repelling the hostile invaders (termed the "antagonists" or simply "Antags" or "Ants") who had chased the Gurus from their own star system, and were already establishing a beachhead on Mars. The narrator of the novel is Master Sergeant Michael Venn of the multi-national force of "Skyrines" (spaceborne Marines) sent to Mars.

== Plot summary ==
Venn returns home from his last tour of duty on "The Red" (Mars) and settles into his apartment in Seattle, Washington, remembering the events of that tour:

Venn and his squad's combat drop onto Mars goes badly wrong after their fleet is attacked in orbit by the Antags. Venn and a handful of survivors are forced to trek across the Mars desert, barely surviving from day to day by finding isolated caches of air and water dropped for previous expeditions. They are unable to establish contact with other elements of their force or their commanders, nor can they receive any intel on the enemy's numbers or locations. One ominous sign of the Antags' superior capabilities is when a comet impacts near the horizon, its course apparently directed by the Antags.

Just as they are about to asphyxiate, they are rescued by Teal, a runaway from a settlement of "Muskies", the leftovers of Earth's earlier, ambitious attempts to establish colonies on Mars.

== Reviews ==
- Review by Russell Letson (2014) in Locus, #646 November 2014
- Review by Adrienne Martini (2014) in Locus, #647 December 2014
- Review by Don Sakers (2015) in Analog Science Fiction and Fact, May 2015
- Review by Andy Sawyer (2015) in Vector 279 Spring
- Review by Colin Steele (2016) in SF Commentary, #91

== See also ==
- Mars in fiction – Depictions of the planet
- Moving Mars – 1993 novel by Greg Bear
- Space marine – Type of soldier in military science fiction
