= Forerunner Saga =

Trilogy of science fiction books

- The cover to Cryptum, the first book in the trilogy
- Author: Greg Bear
- Language: English
- Series: Halo
- Genre: Military science fiction
- Publisher: Tor
- Publication date: January 4, 2011 (Cryptum); January 3, 2012 (Primordium); March 19, 2013 (Silentium)
- Publication place: United States
- Media type: Print (hardcover), E-book, Audiobook
- ISBN: 978-0-7653-2396-5

The Forerunner Saga is a trilogy of military science fiction novels by Greg Bear, based on the Halo series of video games. The books in the series are Halo: Cryptum (2011), Primordium (2012), and Silentium (2013). The books were released in hardcover, e-book, paperback, and audiobook. Bear was given little restriction on the story of the novel; the Halo universe had not yet been explored in that time period.

Cryptum received mixed reviews; some critics liked the Forerunner culture and suspense that Bear created, but others disliked the characters, found the plot too slow, and concluded that the novel was suited only to existing fans of the Halo series. Cryptum appeared on multiple bestseller lists after promotion on Halo Waypoint, a website that serves as a hub for Halo-related information. Primordium reached number seventeen on the New York Times Bestseller List in Hardcover Fiction. Silentium reached number eight on the New York Times Bestseller List for Hardcover Fiction.

== Background ==
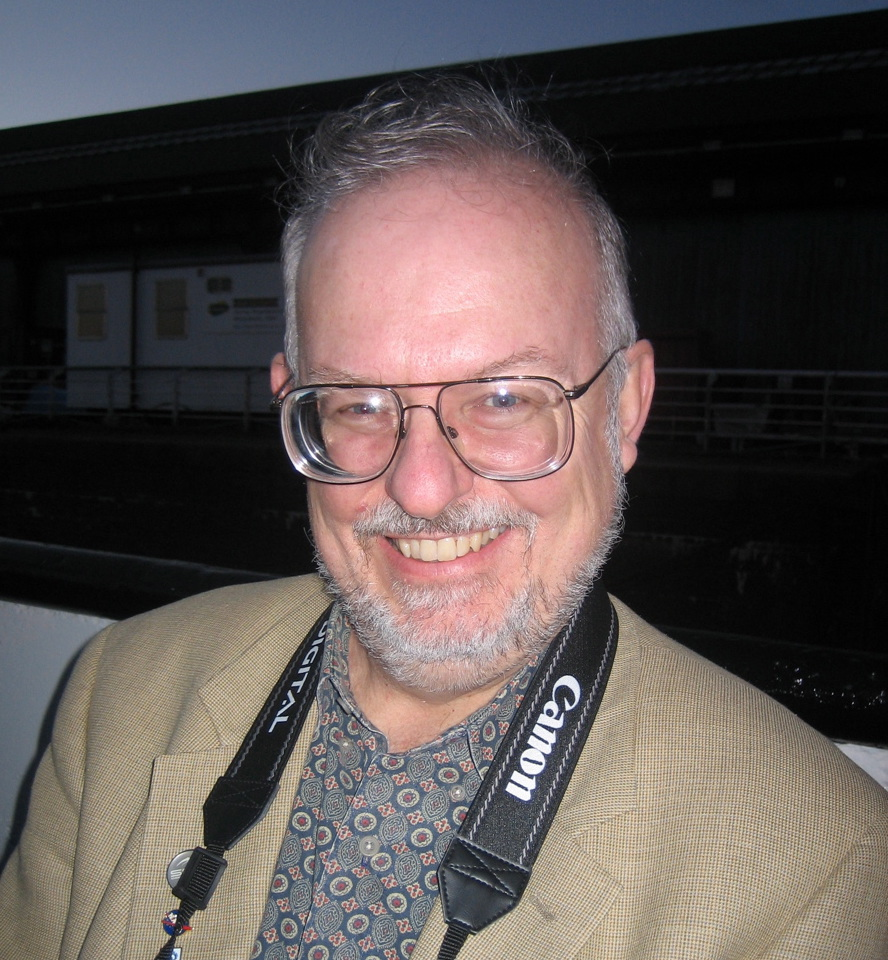
Greg Bear is the author of The Forerunner Saga.

Halo overseers 343 Industries wanted to produce novels that fleshed out the backstory of the ancient Forerunners. Franchise director Frank O'Connor suggested Greg Bear, saying that Bear was to sci-fi as Stephen King was to horror. "I basically said, we want someone of Greg Bear's caliber, that hard sci-fi grandeur that he handled so well in Eon and Anvil of Stars," O'Connor recalled. Bear was in the middle of writing Hull Zero Three when he was approached with the offer. 343 Industries told Bear they wanted a "classic" Bear novel, but inspired by Halo and its extended universe. Bear's three-novel deal was announced on April 6, 2009.

Bear was aware of Halo through his daughter's experience playing the games, and recalled appreciating the hinted-at backstory. Writing for an established universe proved occasionally challenging, needing to respect the established tone of Halo. Bear was made privy to secret plot details 343 Industries had planned to inform his work. Although nothing was forced upon Bear in terms of story templates, he had numerous and comprehensive discussions about the history of the Halo universe and the major events of the Forerunner history that had already been established in Halo 3. Bear used the Forerunner designs and images from the Halo video games as an inspiration, and it showed him there had to be an emphasis on builders within the Forerunner civilization. O'Connor said that the book is meant to have a "hard sci-fi" feel with a "hint of space opera, in the mold of Banks, Reynolds and Bear himself."

The book's cover was designed by Sparth, an artist at 343 Industries known for his "futuristic vistas", and who would later become a creative director at the company. The artwork was adapted from concept art for Halo 4, intended to capture the wondrous scope of the Forerunners. Sparth and Gabriel Garza collaborated for Silentium's cover.

The second novel in the series was announced on July 19, 2011. The book was completed and submitted to the publisher in October. At a Comic-Con panel on the Halo universe, Frank O'Connor stated that the book would have "resonant connections" with Halo 4. Bear stated that the interactions of the humans and the Forerunners in the book were some of his favorite parts of the trilogy.

Silentium had its title, first cover and release date announced by Tor Books on July 11, 2012, with a release date of January 8, 2013. The book's draft was finished by August, and complete by November. The release was delayed until March 2013, to avoid revealing any plot details about Halo 4.

== Synopsis ==
=== Setting and characters ===
The Forerunner Saga takes place approximately 100,000 years before the 26th century setting in the Halo universe, telling the story of the ancient and powerful alien civilization known as the Forerunners. Forerunner society is divided into "rates" based on occupations, such as Builders, Warriors, and Lifeworkers. They were preceded by an enigmatic race known as the Precursors. The books are presented with the in-universe conceit as collected Forerunner testimony and investigations recovered by 26th century humanity.

=== Cryptum ===
The young Forerunner Bornstellar Makes Eternal Lasting visits the human planet Erde-Tyrene (Earth), intent on discovering treasures left by the Precursors. With the aid of two human guides, Chakas and Riser, Bornstellar discovers a cryptum—a Forerunner stasis vessel. Inside is the Didact, a Forerunner general who conscripts Bornstellar, Chakas, and Riser on an interstellar quest given to him by his wife, the Librarian. Bornstellar learns that the Forerunners fought a war with humankind 10,000 years prior. Humanity and their allies, weakened from fighting the Forerunners and a parasite known as the Flood, made a last stand on the ancient Precursor planet Charum Hakkor. After their defeat, the Librarian saved the human race from extinction—they were instead stripped of their technology—and planted genetic commands known as "geas" in them, subconsciously allowing Chakas and Riser to lead Bornstellar to the Didact.

The Didact and company travel to Charum Hakkor. Many of the Precursor structures on the planet, thought indestructible, have fallen into ruin. The Didact also discovers that a prisoner, protected by Precursor and human containment methods, has escaped. They travel to the nearby planet of Faun Hakkor to find it stripped of all sentient life. The Didact sponsors Bornstellar's first mutation—a vital part of Forerunner growth—and imprints his personality and memories upon the young Forerunner.

The Didact's party are captured and imprisoned by Forerunner Builders, under the command of Faber, the Master Builder. Bornstellar is returned to the care of his father because of his family's status and power. Bornstellar learns his father was one of the chief builders of the Halos—massive ringworld weapons. The Didact opposed the Builders' decision to construct such weapons, leading to his exile. Bornstellar is called to the Forerunner Capital to testify against the Master Builder, who has been put on trial; he stands accused of crimes against The Mantle, a Forerunner philosophy that values the preservation of life over all else. Just as the trial is about to begin, the Forerunner artificial intelligence Mendicant Bias betrays the Forerunners and attempts to assume control of the Halos and use them against the Capital.

In the ensuing chaos several Halos escape, their own AIs enacting failsafe protocols. Bornstellar is recovered by the Librarian and her Lifeworkers. The Librarian informs Bornstellar that the Master Builder executed the Didact soon after Bornstellar was sent back to his family. With the news that the Didact is gone, Bornstellar resolves to take his place. The book ends with a narration from the Didact/Bornstellar, revealing that the escaped prisoner on Charum Hakkor was the last Precursor, known as Timeless One or Primordial. Through a conversation the Didact had long ago, it is learned that the Precursors created the Forerunners, only for the Forerunners to rise up and eradicate them; the Timeless One seeks revenge.

=== Primordium ===
Primordium is told through flashbacks, with a damaged Forerunner AI recovered by a human crew. This Forerunner AI, 343 Guilty Spark, was once the human Chakas, and relates his tale.

After being taken prisoner by The Master Builder, Chakas and Riser end up on the Halo ring known as Installation 07 with other humans. Chakas carries the imprint of Forthencho, a human general during the Human-Forerunner war. Chakas befriends Vinnevra and her grandfather Gamelpar, and the three of them follow Vinnevra's geas to find safety. Discovering that the Primordial is guiding humans who had followed their geas to places for experimentation with the Flood. After witnessing The Primordial, they decide to head in the opposite direction.

After crossing an ocean, the trio are found by a Lifeworker who accompanies them with several other humans and a giant ape named Mara. While sleeping at night in the refugee center, Chakas is greeted by Riser who warns him not to trust the Lifeworker; the others are revealed to be illusions run by Forerunner computers called monitors, who are there to extract their spirits and store them as monitors. Gamelpar dies due to old age. The imprints in Riser and Chakas converse and recall the discovery of the Primordial.

The group is captured by Mendicant Bias, and their human imprints extracted; Mendicant Bias promises them revenge on the Forerunners, and kills those who oppose him. A fleet led by the Didact appears and the Didact purges Mendicant Bias from Installation 07. Chakas assists the Didact with moving the Halo and preventing its destruction.

The Didact and Chakas visit The Primordial, who reveals that Precursors decided Forerunners were not meant to inherit the Mantle. Instead, humanity has been selected and is to be tested by the Flood. The Didact destroys the Primordial. Gravely wounded, Chakas is converted into a monitor, and it is revealed that he became the Forerunner AI 343 Guilty Spark. In the present, Chakas/Guilty Spark hijacks the human ship he is aboard. He insists that he can find the spirits of Riser, Vinnevra, and the Librarian, before taking the ship to parts unknown.

=== Silentium ===
The Forerunner investigator Catalog gathers testimony from witnesses about the battle at the Forerunner Capital, and demands testimony from the Librarian and Bornstellar Makes Eternal Lasting—now known as the IsoDidact. While Catalog accompanies the Librarian, she tells it about the events that led to her becoming a Lifeshaper, and her growing split from the original Didact due to their differing opinions about humanity. She reveals that years previous, Lifeworkers undertook an expedition to a nearby galaxy to learn of the Flood's origins. The Librarian and her crew discovered that the Forerunners sent here to destroy the last Precursors instead refused to commit genocide and remained in exile.

In the present, the original (Ur) Didact is discovered alive in a Flood-infected star system, having been captured by the Flood intelligence known as the Gravemind. Though he reaches safety, the UrDidact is severely shaken by the experience. The Gravemind revealed that the Forerunners rebelled upon learning humanity was to receive the Mantle, and killed nearly all the Precursors. A few survived by converting themselves into a powder to later regenerate their forms, but time rendered this powder defective, and gave rise to the Flood, which seeks to consume all sentient life.

The Forerunner war effort against the Flood goes poorly. Formerly-dormant Precursor artifacts across the galaxy begin to reactivate, their immense power bolstering the Flood's already enormous forces. The Forerunners prepare a final plan to stop the Flood; they will fire the Halo rings, destroying all sentient life in the galaxy to stop the Flood's spread. At the Greater Ark, a foundry for Halos, a power struggle ensues between those who follow the IsoDidact, and those who support the Ur-Didact. A massive Flood fleet led by Mendicant Bias arrives and chaos erupts. In the confusion, the Ur-Didact uses converts human populations being stored on the nearby Halo into digital forms, and retreats to his mobile command installation, Requiem. Chakas is tasked with saving the rest of the humans on the Ark and taking them to the lesser Ark, still hidden from the Ur-Didact and the Flood. Chakas manages to save the IsoDidact and takes him to the Lesser Ark as the Flood attack destroys the Halo and Greater Ark.

At the Lesser Ark, the remaining Halos are assigned monitor caretakers in preparation for their distribution across the galaxy. The IsoDidact has a brief conversation with Chakas/343 Guilty Spark and assigns him to Installation 04. The Librarian sneaks aboard Requiem and confronts the Ur-Didact, who is using the essences of humans and his warriors to create an army of mechanical Promethean Knights to fight the Flood and ensure Forerunner supremacy. The Librarian betrays the Ur-Didact and seals him in a cryptum, before returning to earth to oversee the conservation of its life forms before the activation of the Halo Array.

The Librarian passes her title of Lifeshaper to a subordinate, Chant-to-Green, and then sends Chant off to the lesser Ark with the planet's remaining humans. The Gravemind sends ancient human essences to taunt the Librarian, revealing that the Forerunner's repository of information known as the Domain was a Precursor technology. The Librarian realizes that the activation of the Halo Array will mean the destruction of the Domain, and that it will condemn the Ur-Didact to spend the eons to come in complete silence, dwelling on his own rage and madness. She hopes humanity will one day inherit the Mantle.

At the lesser Ark, the IsoDidact activates the rings while the remaining Forerunners fends off Mendicant Bias' fleet, stopping the Flood. Life is reseeded across the galaxy. Guilty Spark's memory is erased and he forgets his old life as Chakas.

In the epilogue, Riser, Vinnevra and other humans are relocated on Installation 00 among many other species, where Forerunners watch over them until they are returned to their homeworld. At Riser's request, his people are relocated to a series of islands. Riser meets with the IsoDidact one last time before the Forerunners leave and the humans begin settling their new home. Mendicant Bias is tried for his crimes, and imprisoned on the Ark to think about atonement.

== Release and reception ==
The novels in the Forerunner Saga were promoted with author events and meetings with 343 Industries personnel, excerpts published in the weeks before release, and giveaways. For Silentium, the Halo Waypoint website issued encrypted messages that allowed fans to unlock additional Halo content, and were also included in the paperback and e-book versions.

Cryptum was the first Halo novel to release in hardcover, in addition to the paperback format, with a total initial print run of 300,000 copies. An unabridged audio book, narrated by Holter Graham, was released alongside the print edition on January 4, 2011. Following its release, Cryptum reached number 22 in the New York Times Best Seller List in the Hardcover Fiction category. It also spent five weeks on the Los Angeles Times Hardcover Fiction Bestseller list, reaching number 17. Publishers Weekly noted that the book was a bestseller in the hardcovers category in early September 2011 at Borders.

Cryptum was met with varying reviews. Dr. Nigel Seel of sciencefiction.com called it tired, unoriginal and boring, saying, "It's hard to care about the flimsy characters, the plot is wearily over familiar, the hero is passive throughout and overall, not enough happens." He criticised the characters as stereotypical and the plot being far too slow, concluding, "This is one for the die-hard Halo fans." Hilary Williamson of Book Loons also considered Cryptum appealing only to Halo fans, but praised Graham's narration. Portland Book Review's Missy Wadkins felt differently. She thought the characters complex and found it comparable to an interesting history lesson. Her review further contrasted Dr. Seel's by recommending it to all science fiction readers, not just Halo fans. Jason Hamilton of Story Hobby also praised the novel; he complimented Bear's creation of a completely different culture to humanity and his balance of providing the reader with enough information to maintain interest without letting on too much and ruining the suspense.

Halo: Primordium was on the New York Times Bestseller List: Hardcover Fiction for the week of January 7, 2012 at number seventeen. The Los Angeles Times had the book on its Bestseller List for two weeks, at number 16 and then at number 14 for the weeks of January 22 and January 29. Publishers Weekly listed the book at number seventeen on their Bestsellers Hardcover Fiction for the week of January 16, 2012.

Story Hobby reviewed the book and gave it an 80% rating, calling the book a "big improvement" over the previous title, citing the exciting conclusion and more human centered story, but called the plot "weak". Book Loons called it "slow", and said it was only with those familiar with the source material, but that the audio book was very good, and that it had an excellent surprise ending.

The book debuted at number eight on the New York Times Hardcover Fiction Bestseller list and number thirty-five the following week. On the New York Times "Combined Hardcover and Paperback Fiction" List it was listed at number twenty four for the week of April 7. The book entered USA Today's Top 150 books on March 28, 2013, and peaked at number 128.
