= Radio man =

Radio man or variations may refer to:

- Radio operator, a person responsible for operating a telecommunications device
  - Radioman (RM), a technical rating in the U.S. Navy
  - Tank radioman, a position in an armoured fighting vehicle
  - Radioman, an alternate name for a signaller
- Repairman who specializes in radios
- Radio personality, a presenter who works over the radio
- Radio Man (born 1951), nickname of a formerly homeless New Yorker, known for wearing a radio while appearing in cameos on TV and film
  Radioman (film) Documentary film about the formerly homeless man
- The Radio Man (novel), a 1948 science fiction novel by Ralph Milne Farley
- Radiomen (novel), a 2015 science fiction novel by Eleanor Lerman
- "Radioman", song by Feeder from Yesterday Went Too Soon, 1999

== See also ==
- Radio Le Mans, an English-language radio service for the 24 Hours of Le Mans motorcar endurance race
- Radio (disambiguation)
- Man (disambiguation)
