= Tangents (collection) =

1989 short story collection by Greg Bear

- First edition cover Cover art by Jim Burns
- Author: Greg Bear
- Genre: Science fiction; Short story collection
- Publisher: Warner Books
- Publication date: August 21, 1989
- ISBN: 1-857-98979-1

Tangents (ISBN 0-446-51401-2) is a 1989 short story collection by the American science fiction writer Greg Bear. The stories originally appeared in a number of different publications.

== Stories ==
- "Blood Music" (later expanded into the novel Blood Music)
- "Sleepside Story"
- "Webster"
- "A Martian Ricorso"
- "Dead Run"
- "Schrödinger's Plague"
- "Through Road no Whither"
- "Tangents"
- "Sisters"
- "The Machineries of Joy"
