= Brotherton (disambiguation) =

Brotherton is a village and civil parish in North Yorkshire, England.

Brotherton may also refer to:

- Brotherton (surname)
- Brotherton Farm, a farm complex in Pennsylvania, United States
- Brotherton Library, a building at the University of Leeds, England
- Name of the first Indian reservation in America, now known as Indian Mills, New Jersey
