= Frederick Kantor =

American physicist and inventor (1942–2020)

Frederick W. Kantor
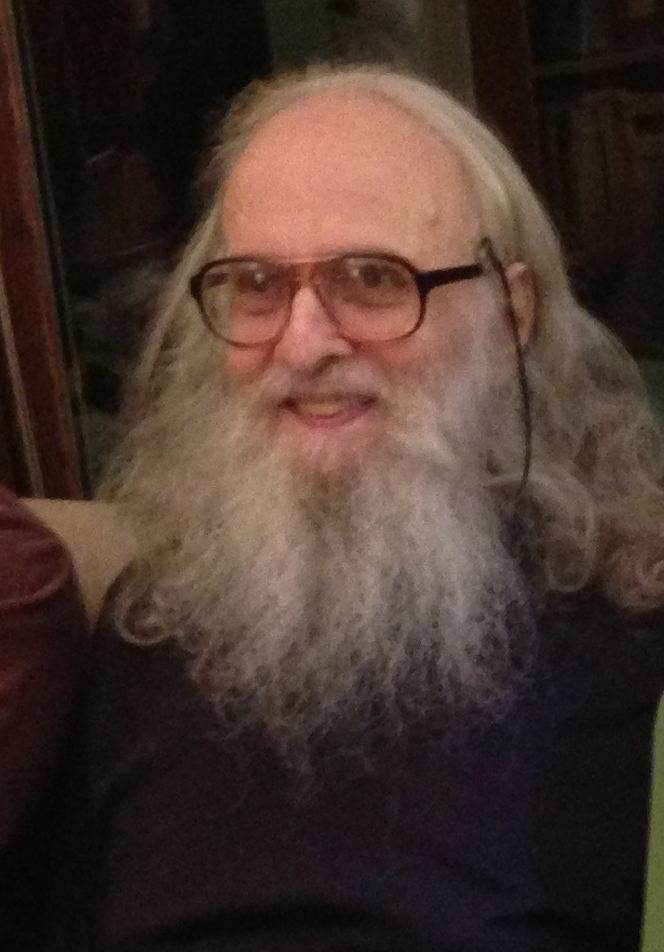
- Kantor in 2018
- Born: July 19, 1942; United States
- Died: May 15, 2020 (aged 77); New York, New York
- Education: Columbia University (1964)
- Known for: Information mechanics
- Scientific career
- Fields: Physics, Inventions
- Workplaces: Columbia University
- Doctoral advisor: Robert Novick
- Other academic advisors: Polykarp Kusch

Frederick Kantor (July 19, 1942 – May 15, 2020) was an American physicist and inventor. He is known for his early work on digital physics, originally coined by Kantor as information mechanics which described "previously thought dissimilar phenomena, such as the fine structure constant (on the scale of the very small) and cosmological red shift (on the scale of the very large)".

Greg Bear cited Kantor's Information Mechanics as an inspiration for his 1990 novel Heads. A Reddit editor named delverofsecrets created an Internet hoax involving an apparently chance meeting of Kantor and hundreds of Reddit followers at 6½ Avenue in Manhattan on July 12, 2012; the crowd was eventually dispersed by the New York Police Department.

== Early life and education ==
Kantor earned his B.A. and Ph.D. from Columbia University. For his doctoral thesis, he invented a way to polish the surfaces of an X-ray telescope.

== Inventions ==
In addition to his efforts in digital physics Kantor holds numerous patents. The later patents deal with several classes of inventions: Rotary Inertial Thermodynamics; dynamic transport of waste fluids in rivers; and a fiber-optic device for persons with macular degeneration. Another invention, never patented, was a File Content Signature utility that was used by electronic bulletin board operators to identify duplicates.

== X-ray telescope ==
However, the invention with potentially greatest impact at present is his earliest work on "Glancing-incidence radiation focusing device having a plurality of members with tension-polished reflecting surfaces". This patent, available at Google patents clearly shows the concentric glancing incidence design for X-ray collection. Kantor's innovation, the use of surface tension to achieve a super-smooth reflecting surface is at the heart of the proposed NASA Lynx Observatory, which describes the same physical process as "grazing incidence.". Kantor's work, part of his doctoral project at Columbia University, was supported in part by government funding. It was done prior to the Bayh–Dole Act, and Columbia did not seek any patent rights. Subsequent to his patents, designs for a NASA project were developed later by Lockheed Corporation, asserting government use rights to apply the invention. Whether the Lynx observatory will be implemented remains an open question.

== Personal life and family ==
Kantor died May 15, 2020. His brother, Paul B. Kantor., is professor emeritus of Information Science at Rutgers University.

== Bibliography ==
- Kantor, Frederick W. (1977). Information Mechanics. Wiley-Interscience. ISBN 9780471029687. OCLC 869307439.
- Kantor, F. W. (June 1982), "An informal partial overview of information mechanics", International Journal of Theoretical Physics, 21 (6–7): 525–535, Bibcode:1982IJTP...21..525K, doi:10.1007/BF02650182, S2CID 121068252
- "New X‐Ray Telescope is Sensitive, Light and Cheap", Physics Today, 20 (3): 88, 1967, Bibcode:1967PhT....20c..88., doi:10.1063/1.3034240
