= Hegira (novel) =

1979 novel by Greg Bear

- Cover of first edition (hardcover)
- Author: Greg Bear
- Language: English
- Genre: Science fiction
- Publisher: Dell
- Publication date: 1979
- Publication place: United States
- Media type: Print (hardback & paperback)
- Pages: 158
- ISBN: 0-7592-0684-8
- OCLC: 78206984

Hegira is a 1979 science fiction novel by American writer Greg Bear. It deals with themes including cyclic time, artificial intelligence, artificial life, and artificial structures of planetary scale.

== Plot summary ==
In the novel, "young" humans (recreations of the medieval originals) are transported through the Big Collapse, at the end of time, to seed the next cycle of the universe. They are transported to Hegira, an artificial environment of the scale of the planet Jupiter, which has habitats for several species on its surface. The habitats are protected and uncoupled from the universe's entropy by means of force fields projected by giant obelisks. In the human realm, these are inscribed with the recorded history of humankind, sorted chronologically from the bottom up, including the science that went with it. People try to understand and copy what they can read on the obelisks, using balloons in some places to reach higher points on the obelisks.

A legend tells the protagonist that his beloved (frozen in stasis) will awaken if he goes on quest to the rim walls of the habitat, and he does so. On the way, he lands on an island with a good view of an obelisk (at least 1,000 mi (1,600 km) high) which is just tumbling down in the distance. Its fall causes a tsunami and devastates a continent. After the devastation, the inscriptions at the top of the fallen obelisk about human history are revealed. The hero's quest to the rim succeeds. He makes contact with an artificial intelligence guardian of Hegira, who tells him the story and advises him to go and populate the new universe since he has become part of the last one.

== Reviews ==
- Review by Scott Edelman (1979) in Science Fiction & Fantasy Book Review, July 1979
- Review by Richard E. Geis (1979) in Science Fiction Review, August 1979
- Review by Michael Bishop (1980) in The Magazine of Fantasy & Science Fiction, January 1980
- Review by David Langford [as by Dave Langford] (1980) in Foundation, #18 January 1980
- Review by Orson Scott Card (1980) in Destinies, February–March 1980
- Review [German] by uncredited (1982) in Reclams Science Fiction Führer
- Review [German] by Michael Nagula [as by Maik] (1983) in Perry Rhodan, #291: Brücke zwischen den Sternen?
- Review by David Wingrove (1987) in Vector 139
- Review by Paul Kincaid (1988) in Paperback Inferno, #72
- Review by uncredited (2000) in Vector 210
