= Radiomen =

Novel by Eleanor Lerman

- First edition
- Author: Eleanor Lerman
- Cover artist: Lon Kirschner
- Language: English
- Genre: Science fiction
- Published: 2015
- Publisher: Permanent Press
- Publication place: United States

Radiomen is an American science fiction novel by Eleanor Lerman.

== Plot ==
Laurie Perzin is a middle-aged bartender in Queens that works nights at Kennedy airport. She lives an unremarkable life, having no close family and a childhood memory of a mysterious encounter with "the radioman." When she was six she met a shadowy figure when listening to her uncle's radio. She spends years pretending the meeting was a dream and it sets off a sequence of events that pull her into the company of a psychic, a radio host, a strange dog and the leader of a religious cult that believes aliens, including the radioman, are destined to bring humans to enlightenment.

== Awards ==
The novel was the winner of the 2016 John W. Campbell Memorial Award for Best Science Fiction Novel.
