= Vitals (novel) =

2002 novel by Greg Bear

- First edition (publ. Del Rey Books)
- Author: Greg Bear
- Language: English
- Genre: Science fiction
- Publisher: Del Rey Books
- Publication date: January 2, 2002
- Publication place: United States
- ISBN: 9780345435286
- OCLC: 48657277
- Dewey Decimal: 813/.54
- LC Class: PS3552.E157 V58

Vitals is a 2002 techno-thriller novel by American writer Greg Bear, nominated for a John W. Campbell Memorial Award in 2002.

The main protagonist is Hal Cousins, a scientist who wishes to find a way to prevent death. He gets his funding from angel investors – rich businessmen who are determined to live a thousand years. On an exotic ocean floor lifeform retrieval mission in a small deep sea vessel, his pilot goes berserk, starts spouting gibberish, and tries to kill him. He survives, but when he gets back to the ship, he finds that a member of the crew also went mad and started spouting gibberish, killing four scientists on board the ship. The rest of the crew is distant from him, on the grounds of what he calls bad mojo. He is disowned by the sponsor in question. Hal's twin brother Rob is murdered, by someone who is later revealed to be Ben Bridger.

The story develops from there, taking in his twin brother's widow, Lissa; Rudy Banning, a once respected professor and writer turned into an antisemitic conspiracy theorist by a brain-altering microbe; and a scheming group of immortals who want to stay unique. They are able to do this because they have access to bacteriological research by Russian scientist Maxim Golokhov from the 1940s who was working for Beria and Stalin. Stalin possibly cameos in the story, but the issue is left vague.

There are five parts with different first-person narrators. Parts one, three, and five are narrated by Hal Cousins, and parts two and four are narrated by Benjamin Bridger.

By the end of the book, the main characters are all either dead, irrelevant, or the victim of mind-altering xenophages.

Some elements of the book relate to transhumanism and life extension. Biology is a major theme in Bear's work, and bacteria and bacterial intelligence played a central role in his 1983 novel Blood Music as well.

== Reviews ==
- Review by Gary K. Wolfe (2001) in Locus, #489 October 2001
- Review by Don D'Ammassa (2001) in Science Fiction Chronicle, #219 December 2001
- Review by Nick Gevers (2001) in Locus, #491 December 2001
- Review by John Grant (2002) in Interzone, #177 March 2002
- Review by John Clute (2002) in Interzone, #181 August 2002
- Review by Peter Heck (2002) in Asimov's Science Fiction, September 2002
- Review by Thomas A. Easton [as by Tom Easton] (2002) in Analog Science Fiction and Fact, October 2002
- Review by Lawrence Person (2002) in Nova Express, Summer 2002
- Review [German] by Regnier Le Dyckt (2004) in phantastisch!, #14
- Review [French] by Pascal J. Thomas (2004) in Galaxies, #35
