= Brotherton (surname) =

Brotherton is a surname. Notable people with the surname include:

- Alice Williams Brotherton (1848–1930), American writer
- Edward Brotherton, 1st Baron Brotherton (1856–1930), English businessman and politician
- Helen Brotherton (vegetarian), English vegetarianism activist and philanthropist
- Helen Brotherton (1914–2009), English conservationist
- John Brotherton, American actor
- John Brotherton (industrialist) (1829–1917), innovative tube manufacturer who served as the 33rd Mayor of Wolverhampton 1883/84
- Joseph Brotherton (1783–1857), English politician, minister and activist
- Martha Brotherton (1782–1861), English cookbook writer
- Michael Brotherton (born 1931), British journalist and politician
- Michael Brotherton (priest) (1935–2025), English Anglican priest
- Mike Brotherton (born 1968), American science fiction writer and astronomer
- Simon Brotherton, British sports announcer
- Thomas William Brotherton (1782–1868), British Army general
- Thomas of Brotherton, 1st Earl of Norfolk (1300–1338)
- Wilbur Brotherton (1922–2021), American politician
