= Strength of Stones =

1981 novel by Greg Bear

- Cover art from the first edition
- Author: Greg Bear
- Cover artist: John Harris
- Language: English
- Genre: Science fiction
- Publisher: Ace
- Publication date: 1981
- Publication place: United States
- Media type: Print (hardback & paperback)
- Pages: 272
- ISBN: 0-4417-9069-0

Strength of Stones is a 1981 science fiction novel by American writer Greg Bear. It was published electronically by E-Reads in 1999.

== Plot summary ==
The novel is set in a far future where cities are completely automated including the ability to move themselves. At some point in the past the cities decided that humans were not required, or wanted, and banished them, leaving their former populations to live in the wilderness. Humans see the cities as a kind of Eden, a paradise they've been expelled from. Over time, some have chosen to reject that banishment and have attempted to plunder the cities. The cities themselves also appear to be failing, perhaps because they lack an enduring purpose with no population to protect. One city has uniquely allowed a human to live inside it.
