= The Forge of God =

1987 novel by Greg Bear

- Cover of first edition (hardcover)
- Author: Greg Bear
- Language: English
- Series: The Forge of God series
- Genre: Science fiction
- Publisher: Tor Books
- Publication date: October 1987
- Publication place: United States
- Media type: Print (Hardcover & Paperback)
- Pages: 474
- ISBN: 0-312-93021-6
- OCLC: 16089603
- Dewey Decimal: 813/.54 19
- LC Class: PS3552.E157 F6 1987
- Followed by: Anvil of Stars

The Forge of God is a 1987 science fiction novel by American writer Greg Bear. Earth faces destruction when an inscrutable and overwhelming alien form of life attacks.

== Plot ==
The novel features scenes and events, including the discovery of a nearly-dead alien in the desert, who clearly says in English, "I'm sorry, but there is bad news," and the alien's subsequent interrogation and autopsy; the discovery of an artificial geological formation and its subsequent nuclear destruction by a desperate military; and the Earth's eventual destruction by the mutual annihilation of a piece of neutronium and a piece of antineutronium dropped into Earth's core.

There is another alien faction at work, however, represented on Earth by small spider-like robots that recruit human agents through some form of mind control. They frantically collect all the human data, biological records, tissue samples, seeds, and DNA from the biosphere that they can and evacuate a handful of people from Earth. In outer space, this faction's machines combat and eventually destroy the attackers but not before Earth's fate is sealed. The evacuees eventually settle a newly terraformed Mars while some form the crew of a Ship of the Law to hunt down the home world of the killers, a quest described in the sequel, Anvil of Stars.

One of the point-of-view characters is Arthur Gordon, a scientist. He, his wife Francine and son Martin are among those rescued from the destruction of Earth. Some other characters are close to an American president, who fails to take action against the threat.

The two books show at least one solution to the Fermi paradox, with electromagnetically noisy civilizations being snuffed out by the arrival of self-replicating machines designed to destroy any potential threat to their (possibly long-dead) creators. (A similar theme is explored in Fred Saberhagen's Berserker novels.)

== Cultural reference ==
It features a character, Lawrence Van Cott, that is modelled on science fiction author Larry Niven, whose full name is "Laurence van Cott Niven".

== Reception ==
Dave Langford reviewed The Forge of God for White Dwarf #95, and stated that "A good nasty read [...] with a flicker of optimism: in the jungle Out There, someone is on our side ..."

The Forge of God was nominated for the Nebula Award for Best Novel in 1987, and was also nominated for the Hugo and Locus Awards in 1988.

== Reviews ==
- Review by Dan Chow (1987) in Locus, #319 August 1987
- Review by Stephen P. Brown (1987) in Science Fiction Eye, #2, August 1987
- Review by Don D'Ammassa (1987) in Science Fiction Chronicle, #99 December 1987
- Review by Tom Easton (1988) in Analog Science Fiction/Science Fact, February 1988
- Review by Tom Jones (1988) in Vector 142
- Review by John Sladek (1988) in Foundation, #42 Spring 1988
- Review by Paul J. McAuley (1988) in Interzone, #23 Spring 1988
- Review by Dean R. Lambe (1988) in Thrust, #29, Winter 1988
- Review by John Gilbert (1989) in Fear, September 1989
- Review by Chris C. Bailey (1989) in Paperback Inferno, #81
- Review [French] by Piet Hollander (1990) in Yellow Submarine, #68
- Review [German] by John Sladek (1991) in Das Science Fiction Jahr Ausgabe 1991
- Review by Tom Jones (1999) in Vector 204
- Review by Chris Amies (2001) in Vector 220
- Review by John Sladek (2019) in New Maps: More Uncollected John Sladek

== Movie ==
In the early 2000s, The Forge of God and Anvil of Stars, as well as an as-yet-unwritten third book, were optioned by Warner Bros. to be made into movies. It was reported that Stephen Susco worked on a script for The Forge of God. In July 2006, Greg Bear mentioned on his website that the movie is "Still under option. Studio engaged in 'silent running.' "

However, in October 2010, Bear commented on his website that Ken Nolan (who wrote the screen adaptation for Ridley Scott's Black Hawk Down film), was actively working on a screenplay.
