= The Wind from a Burning Woman =

Sci-fi series

- Dust-jacket illustration by Vincent Di Fate for The Wind from a Burning Woman
- Author: Greg Bear
- Illustrator: Dennis Neal Smith
- Cover artist: Vincent Di Fate
- Language: English
- Genre: Science fiction
- Publisher: Arkham House
- Publication date: 1982
- Publication place: United States
- Media type: Print (hardback)
- Pages: xii, 270 pp
- ISBN: 0-87054-094-7
- OCLC: 8786048
- Dewey Decimal: 813/.54 19
- LC Class: PS3552.E157 W5 1983

The Wind from a Burning Woman is a collection of science fiction stories by author Greg Bear. It was released in 1982 and was the author's first hardcover book. It was published by Arkham House in an edition of 3,046 copies.

The book is unusual among Arkham House publications in that a signed 'state' exists. Bear wanted to celebrate his first hardcover story collection with a limited edition, so he bought 250 copies himself, had special bookplates printed up, pasted them inside the front covers, and then signed each plate. He also had the two artists who worked on the book sign the plates. This state of the book was not strictly authorized by Arkham House, but can be considered a variant or special state of the volume.

Two of the included stories were nominated for a Nebula Award. "Petra" was nominated in 1983, but lost. "Hardfought" was nominated in 1984, and won.

== Contents ==
The Wind from a Burning Woman contains the following tales:

1. "Preface"
2. "The Wind From a Burning Woman"
3. "The White Horse Child"
4. "Petra"
5. "Scattershot"
6. "Mandala"
7. "Hardfought"

== Reprints ==
=== Arkham House ===
- Second printing, 1983–1,503 copies.

=== Others ===
- New York: Ace, 1984.
- New York: Popular Library, 1990.
- London: Century, 1992 (revised as The Venging).
