= Foundation and Chaos =

1998 novel by Greg Bear

- The Second Foundation Trilogy: Foundation and Chaos
- Author: Greg Bear
- Cover artist: J.P. Targete
- Language: English
- Series: The Second Foundation Trilogy
- Genre: Science fiction
- Publisher: Harper Prism
- Publication date: February 1998
- Publication place: United States
- Media type: Print (hardback & paperback)
- Pages: 352
- ISBN: 978-0-06-105242-2
- OCLC: 37993248
- Dewey Decimal: 813/.54 21
- LC Class: PS3552.E157 F65 1998
- Preceded by: Foundation's Fear
- Followed by: Foundation's Triumph

Foundation and Chaos (1998) is a science fiction novel by Greg Bear, set in Isaac Asimov's Foundation universe. It is the second book of a trilogy written after Asimov's death by three authors, authorized by the Asimov estate.

== Plot summary ==
The novel is the second part of the Second Foundation Trilogy and takes place almost entirely in the same time frame as "The Psychohistorians", which is the first part of the novel Foundation. In addition to telling a more expanded version of Hari Seldon's confrontation with the Commission of Public Safety, it also interweaves R. Daneel Olivaw's struggle against a sect of robots who oppose his plans for humanity.

While covering the same period as in Asimov’s "The Psychohistorians", Foundation and Chaos focuses more on paternal super-robot R. Daneel Olivaw than on Hari Seldon. Olivaw’s 20 millennia of machinations and contrivances are questioned by “Calvinian” robots who do not observe Olivaw’s Zeroth Law (“No robot may harm humanity or, through inaction, allow humanity to come to harm”) developed in Asimov’s Robots and Empire. Olivaw’s actions dampen human intellectual growth and variation until the human species matures.

Foundation and Chaos portrays the rise of mentalics (telepaths who can influence other’s thoughts) such as Wanda Seldon and Stettin Palver, who will form the Second Foundation. Powerful Public Safety Commissioner Linge Chen again plays a prominent role as the true Imperial power behind fatuous playboy Emperor Klayus. Reconstructed super-robot Dors Venabili also appears.

== Reviews ==
- Review by Gary K. Wolfe (1998) in Locus, #446 March 1998
- Review by Thomas Marcinko (1998) in Science Fiction Age, May 1998
- Review by Curt Wohleber (1998) in Science Fiction Weekly, 1 June 1998
- Review by Mark L. Olson (1998) in Aboriginal Science Fiction, Summer 1998
- Review by Nigel Brown (1998) in Interzone, #138 December 1998
- Review by Steven H Silver (1998) in SF Site, Mid-April 1998, (1998)
- Review by Darrell Schweitzer (1999) in Aboriginal Science Fiction, Fall 1999
- Review by Gary Wilkinson (1999) in Vector 208
