= Dead Lines =

Novel by Greg Bear

- First edition (UK)
- Author: Greg Bear
- Language: English
- Genre: Science fiction novel
- Publisher: HarperCollins (UK); Ballantine Books (US)
- Publication date: 2005
- Publication place: United States
- Media type: Print (Paperback)
- Pages: 320 pp
- ISBN: 978-0345448385

Dead Lines (2005) is a science fiction novel written by Greg Bear.

== Plot ==
Peter Russell, formerly a successful director of soft-porn films, is in a career slump, unable to compete with the new market for hardcore pornography. He accepts an offer to promote a new type of analog cell phone called Trans with global reach, requiring no network of relay towers, but the makers of Trans are really hiring Peter for his connections with Joseph Benoliel, an aging billionaire, who can provide much needed start-up capital. The technology utilized by Trans uses the nearly unlimited quantum bandwidth by which subatomic particles communicate with each other, and when users of Trans begin to see ghosts, Peter gradually discovers that Trans has tapped into a channel where human memories are stored and survive the death of the body. Unfortunately, Trans has made a noise and awakened nameless things much older than human beings, who feed on souls and memories.

== Reviews ==
- Review by Gary K. Wolfe (2004) in Locus, #520 May 2004
- Review by Rick Kleffel (2004) in Interzone, #194 September–October 2004
- Review by Gahan Wilson (2004) in Realms of Fantasy, October 2004
- Review by Walter Minkel (2005) in The New York Review of Science Fiction, February 2005
- Review by Rick Kleffel (2005) in Cemetery Dance, #51, 2005
