= Eleanor Lerman =

American writer

- Born: 1952 (age 73–74); United States
- Occupation: Writer
- Writing career
- Language: English
- Genres: Poetry, fiction

Eleanor Lerman (born 1952) is an American poet, novelist, and short story writer.

== Life and career ==
Lerman was born in the Bronx, and raised there and in Far Rockaway. She is a lifelong New Yorker, and is of Jewish heritage.

=== Early years ===
Lerman wrote poetry while in high school, with the encouragement of a sympathetic teacher:

As a writer, I have been rescued more than once in my life. The first time was by a high school English teacher who told me, that I'd better not read my poetry to the rest of the class (a bit too much East Village raunch, I guess, for my classmates) but encouraged me to be a writer, because while my work wasn't his taste, it was good.

At age 18 she left home and moved from the Bronx to Greenwich Village, where she found an unusual job:

Person wanted to sweep up in harpsichord factory. That was the ad in the Village Voice that I answered in 1970 when I was eighteen years old and looking for a job so I could support myself in the city, where I was headed to join the revolution. ...

Lerman's job was in a workshop, founded by Wolfgang Zuckermann, that produced and shipped kits from which amateurs built harpsichords, at the time a minor cultural phenomenon.

It was the harpsichord kit factory where I worked, the long-lost Greenwich Village of artists and gay bars and roller-skating queens, along with my neighbor, a film producer, who introduced me to a community of writers, and my boss, Michael Zuckermann [Wolfgang's younger brother], who gave me the job because he said I had soulful eyes (I hope I still do!), which in the psychedelic days was the only qualification you needed, I guess, to make harpsichord kit parts (I graduated from the sweeping up part pretty quickly) that made me believe it was possible to actually live the life of a writer. ... At the time, Zuckermann Harpsichords was housed in the first floor of a small, quirky 19th century building on Charles Street. Michael not only gave me a job, he gave me a tiny apartment upstairs. The whole operation employed about five girls, who drilled pin blocks, used a table saw and a lathe, but also worked on eccentric machines that Michael had made himself out of sewing machine parts ... Sometimes we ran out of parts and I was supposed to write what we needed on a blackboard. Instead, ... I used the blackboard to write poems.

The active artistic surroundings of Greenwich Village led to her being recognized and encouraged as a poet. The film producer mentioned in the quotations given here was named Harrison Starr; he had been executive producer for the notable counterculture film Zabriskie Point (1970).

The film producer, who lived in a carriage house on the lane behind the harpsichord workshop, had to walk through our space every day to get his mail, and he began stopping by the blackboard to read my poetry. One day, he said something to me like, You know, that's pretty good. You ought to try to get your work published. It had never occurred to me that was possible until he suggested it. ... Since I had no idea how to actually get a book published, I took the manuscript of poems I had and sent them to Viking, the press that published Cohen, and some very kind person there wrote me back and suggested trying Wesleyan University Press, which I did, and in 1973, they published my first book of poetry.

=== Armed Love and its aftermath ===
This volume, Armed Love, attracted positive critical attention and indeed was nominated for a National Book Award. Not all reviews were positive; X. J. Kennedy, writing in The New York Times, had harsh words for Lerman's technique as a poet and, more controversially, hinted at criticism of Lerman's choice of subject matter, which included illegal drugs and lesbian sexuality. Drawing on the recently introduced system of film ratings, Kennedy described Armed Love as "XX rated".

Lerman describes her experience of youthful fame as "devastating"—not as a result of Kennedy's criticism, but rather from the burden of notoriety it created:

The "double X" warning made me briefly notorious and from the Sunday morning that review came out and then on for a long time, my phone didn't stop ringing. You have to remember this was 1973; still the hippie years, with disco and the club scene on the horizon. The gay bars around Sheridan Square and down on West Street were packed. If you were Andy Warhol or various other notables of the time, who better to have on your arm than a twenty-one-year old poet who dressed like Cher and had just been named by the venerable 'New York Times' as a literary outlaw? I got invitations to go everywhere with everybody--but the problem was that in reality, I was a pretty much uneducated, inexperienced Jewish kid from the Bronx with an admittedly nasty streak, but I was scared to death of all these people. I stopped answering the phone.

Her fame also led Lerman to become acquainted with some of the leading literary figures of the time, which had a daunting effect on her morale:

I ended up meeting some of the day's most important writers including Donald Barthelme, Richard Stern, Philip Roth and Tom Pynchon (all still very important, extraordinary writers, I must add) and while they couldn't have been kinder to me and more helpful, I was scared of them too. I thought, I'll never be able to do what these guys do.

Although Lerman published a second book in 1975, she eventually withdrew from her literary career and undertook a more conventional life with marriage and (nonliterary) job.

=== Resumption of writing career ===
Much later (2001), her career as a writer resumed when Sarabande Books commissioned her third volume of poetry, The Mystery of Meteors. She reports a second "rescue", long after the first by her high school teacher; this was "by my current publisher Sarabande, who asked me, after a decades-long hiatus, if I'd like to try to write poetry again. It turned out that I would."

A steady stream of work has since followed, along with a variety of forms of recognition. Her fourth book, Our Post-Soviet History Unfolds, won the Lenore Marshall Poetry Prize in 2006, given by the American Academy of Poets and The Nation magazine. In awarding the prize, Tony Hoagland wrote, "Eleanor Lerman's poems have sociological savvy, philosophical rue, historical recognition, and vernacular resilience. They sing a song that is bravely gloomy, but they sing it with a fierce and earned dignity."

For one of her books, The Blonde on the Train, the author has experimented with creating a web site devoted specifically to the book and its contents, including excerpts.

In her novel, Radiomen, Lerman ventures into speculative fiction with a story that involves radios, aliens, a bartender at Kennedy Airport, and a dog with unusual ancestry.

Lerman lives in Long Beach, New York, just outside New York City and not far from her childhood community of Far Rockaway.

== Awards ==
She has been nominated for a Lambda Literary Award, and in 2006 her fiction collection "Observers and Other Stories" was published by the Lesbian publisher Artemis Press.

Lerman is also the recipient of the inaugural Juniper Prize, the 2002 Joy Bale Boone Award for Poetry, the 2006 Milton Dorfman Poetry Prize, and a fiction grant from the New York Foundation for the Arts. In 2007, she received a Literature Fellowship from the National Endowment for the Arts. In 2011, she was awarded a Guggenheim Fellowship.

Lerman won the John W. Campbell Memorial Award for Best Science Fiction Novel in 2016 for Radiomen and in 2018 received an American Fiction Award from American Book Fest for The Stargazer's Embassy.

== Verse technique ==
Lerman writes in free verse; i.e. unrhymed with no definite pattern of scansion. There appears nevertheless to be some regularity in the distribution of stressed syllables in the line. The poems occasionally begin with one or two lines of traditional iambic pentameter, and drift toward pentameter elsewhere. Enjambment is frequent; i.e. the material is often divided into lines at a point that would not correspond to natural pause locations in speech.

The verse is crammed with specific, vivid references to the real world; for example, the tools and harpsichord plectra mentioned in the conclusion of "The Farm in Winter", from The Mystery of Meteors (2001):

And in my mind there comes a picture of you:
lean and skillful, born ten times into magical
generations of yourself, a creator, who rescues
wood from the growing seasons and teaches it
to serve, harmoniously, the more eternal seasons
of music. And I am going home to you and your
mystical tools: the plane, the saw, the plectrum

and I am going home to you, in the long ago,
in the time before everything, on a perfect day

Elsewhere Lerman has complained of the personal cost (distraction, the annoyance of friends) of collecting the mental material of her poems from everyday experience; see "Being a poet", cited below.

== Bibliography ==
=== Poetry ===
- Armed Love. Wesleyan University Press. 1973. ISBN 9780819510686.
- Come the Sweet by and by. University of Massachusetts Press. 1975. ISBN 9780870231957.
- The Mystery of Meteors. Sarabande Books. 2001. ISBN 9781889330556.
- Our Post-Soviet History Unfolds Sarabande Books, 2005, ISBN 9781932511246
- The Sensual World Re-Emerges, Sarabande Books, 2010, ISBN 9781932511819
- Strange Life, Mayapple Press, 2015, ISBN 9781936419357
- Slim Blue Universe, Mayapple Press, 2024 ISBN 9781952781179
- Oleander Marriage, Mayapple Press, 2025 ISBN 9781952781292

=== Short stories ===
- Observers and Other Stories, Artemis Press, 2002, ISBN 9780971726123
- The Blonde on the Train Mayapple Press, 2009, ISBN 9780932412737
- The Game Cafe: Stories of New York City in Covid Time Mayapple Press, 2022 ISBN 9781952781131

=== Novels ===
- Janet Planet, Mayapple Press, 2011
- Radiomen, The Permanent Press, 2015
- The Stargazer's Embassy, Mayapple Press, 2017
- Watkins Glen, Mayapple Press, 2024

=== Essay ===
- "Being a poet: an embarrassing pursuit", in Carol Smallwood, Colleen S. Harris, Cynthia Brackett-Vincent (2012) Women on Poetry. McFarland and Co., pp. 144–148. Partly autographical, with an account of her return to writing poetry after a 25-year hiatus; also discussion of the embarrassment caused by constantly monitoring her life experience for ideas for poems.
