= Darwin's Children =

2003 novel by Greg Bear

First edition (publ. Del Rey Books) Cover artist: Ben Perini: Author / Greg Bear; Country / United States; Language / English; Series / Darwin series; Genre / Science fiction novel; Media type / Print (hardback & paperback); Preceded By / Darwin's Radio

Darwin's Children is a science fiction novel by Greg Bear published in 2003. It is a sequel to his 1999 novel Darwin's Radio.

A human endogenous retrovirus, SHEVA, begins to spread, attaching to people's chromosomes. As it becomes active, it causes the birth of millions of genetically-altered children. To the government, that represents a deadly threat to public health and safety and so it takes the mutated children from their parents and place them in concentration camps.

The children communicate by using complex verbal tricks, enhanced facial expressions, and psychoactive chemical scents made from their own bodies. They also form stable groups that minimize conflict and maximize cooperation. Mitch Rafelson and his wife, Kaye Lang, have a SHEVA daughter named Stella Nova that they try to shield from the government's Emergency Action forces, but the child is captured and sent to a camp. A government virus researcher, Christopher Dicken, makes significant discoveries, as does Kaye.

== Reception ==
A Kirkus Reviews review says, "Scary and technically plausible though demanding work, even if the good guys' resurgence depends more on coincidence than logic." Peter Cannon, of Publishers Weekly, reviewed the book saying, "Bear's sure sense of character, his fluid prose style and the fascinating culture his 'Shevite' children begin to develop all make for serious SF of the highest order." A Library Journal review says, "Believable characters and riveting storytelling make this a priority purchase for sf collections."

Darwin's Children received nominations for the Arthur C. Clarke, Locus, and John W. Campbell Memorial Awards in 2004.
