= Anvil of Stars =

1992 novel by Greg Bear

- First edition
- Author: Greg Bear
- Language: English
- Series: The Forge of God Series
- Genre: Science fiction
- Publisher: Legend Books
- Publication date: 1992
- Publication place: United States
- Media type: Print (hardback & paperback)
- Pages: 471
- ISBN: 978-0-446-36403-4
- OCLC: 27319153
- Preceded by: The Forge of God

Anvil of Stars is a science fiction novel by American writer Greg Bear, a sequel to The Forge of God. The book was initially released in 1992 by Warner Books. It and Forge helped build Bear's reputation within the science fiction community and have been widely reviewed by fans and industry critics.

In the novel, volunteers from among survivors of the recently destroyed Earth are sent on a quest by a mysterious race of beings known as "The Benefactors" to find and destroy "The Killers", the civilization responsible for the Earth's destruction. The Benefactors' Law requires the "Destruction of all intelligences responsible for or associated with the manufacture of self-replicating and destructive devices."

The book is written almost entirely from the point of view of a central character, Martin Gordon, known as Martin Spruce, who is the son of a central character in The Forge of God, Arthur Gordon. Although a leader of Pan, Martin has moral qualms. His successor, Hans, however, does not hesitate to finish "the Job."

== Plot ==
There are two interwoven themes in the novel. The first is the cost of justice. Destroying the race that attempted to destroy humanity (and, it is later revealed, other races) appears to be a simple matter of retaliation. The Killers, when they are discovered, have formidable philosophical defenses in addition to their vast technological resources. They have created hundreds of sapient races, interlocked in a culture of breathtaking complexity and beauty. The execution of justice falls to children of the destroyed planets. Those from Earth base their on-ship culture on Peter Pan, calling themselves Wendys and Lost Boys.

It is revealed once the Leviathan system is destroyed that the Killers were, in fact, still active within the system, continuing to manufacture fleets of self-replicating machines to destroy alien races. However, while the Killers were destroyed and justice served, trillions of what were likely innocents had to die to accomplish this. Bear leaves the human crew torn between relief that their work is complete and their guilt that they were little better than those they had come to destroy.

== Reviews ==
- Reviews by Russell Letson, Faren Miller and Gary K. Wolfe in Locus: #374 and #375 (1992).
- Review by Andy Sawyer (1992) in Paperback Inferno, #95
- Review by Mary Gentle (1992) in Interzone, #60 June 1992
- Review by Charles Von Rospach (1992) in Amazing Stories, July 1992
- Review by Thomas A. Easton [as by Tom Easton] (1992) in Analog Science Fiction and Fact, September 1992
- Review by John Clute (1992) in The New York Review of Science Fiction, October 1992
- Review by Colin Bird (1993) in Vector 173
- Review by Colin Steele (1993) in SF Commentary, #73/74/75
