= Queen of Angels (novel) =

1990 science fiction novel by Greg Bear

- Cover of first edition (hardcover)
- Author: Greg Bear
- Language: English
- Genre: Science fiction novel
- Publisher: Warner Books
- Publication date: July 1990
- Publication place: United States
- Media type: Print (hardback & paperback)
- Pages: 420
- ISBN: 0-446-51400-4
- OCLC: 20854171
- Dewey Decimal: 813/.54 20
- LC Class: PS3552.E157 Q44 1990

Queen of Angels is a 1990 science fiction novel written by Greg Bear. It was nominated for the Hugo, Campbell and Locus Awards in 1991. It was followed by a sequel, "/", also known as Slant.

== Plot summary ==
Queen of Angels describes our world just prior to the binary millennium (2048 AD) through several parallel (and to some degree interlocking) tales. Nanotechnology has transformed almost every aspect of American society, and its application to psychology, psychiatry, and neuroscience has resulted in new techniques for mental "therapy" that have created new forms of social stratification. Increasingly, individuals are "therapied: "by means of "nano-therapy," they are turned into well-integrated personalities capable of productive work and constructive social interaction, which does not threaten the social order. Therapied individuals have access to the best jobs. There are two other classes: the "high naturals," who possess such a positive mental makeup that they do not need any therapy, and the "untherapied," who find themselves increasingly marginalized.

The central unifying element involves a famous writer, Emmanuel Goldsmith, who has committed a gruesome series of murders, a crime almost unheard of in the age of therapy. One storyline involves Mary Choy, a high natural police detective assigned to the case to track down and arrest the murderer. Mary is a transform since she has chosen to have her body extensively altered by nanotechnology to enhance her abilities as a policewoman and also for aesthetic reasons.

A second storyline involves Richard Fettle, a good friend of the murderer, also an untherapied writer, who must come to terms with what happened to his friend and how his artists' lives, and all of the untherapied must change. The third plot line concerns Martin Burke, a pioneer in psychotherapy who uses a technique which allows him to directly enter and interact with a patient's psychology, the "Country of the Mind," through a sort of virtual reality. Although disgraced at the story's opening, Dr. Burke is given the opportunity to use his technique to explore Goldsmith's mind, which turns out to be one of the most fascinating and dangerous minds imaginable.

Finally, the fourth plotline considers the nature of artificial intelligence, as an AI robot space probe discovers life on a planet in the Alpha Centauri system and simultaneously achieves its own independent self-awareness, as does its twin back on Earth.

The novel deals with issues of technology, identity, the nature of justice, and the existence of consciousness and the soul. Queen of Angels, set in 2047, was written just before the creation of the first website in 1991 and describes a global network based on the exchange of text (a sort of super USENET), whereas the sequel, Slant, set in 2055 and written in 1997 after the coming of the World Wide Web, describes a global network which has inexplicably changed to resemble a vast shared virtual reality.

Also in the novel is "Citizen Oversight," a quasi-governmental agency that collects data on citizens: medical, financial, legal. It also collects information from public sources such as video cameras with facial recognition and has the ability to track individuals. Local police agencies can appeal to Citizen Oversight to conduct a query on an individual and Citizen Oversight may or may not give out the requested information, based on their interpretation of the "Raphkind Amendment."
