= Mike Brotherton =

American novelist

- Born: Michael Sean Brotherton; March 26, 1968 (age 58); Granite City, Illinois, U.S.
- Education: John Burroughs School; Rice University (BS); University of Texas at Austin (PhD)
- Occupations: Writer; astronomer
- Writing career
- Genre: Hard science fiction

Michael Sean Brotherton (born March 26, 1968) is an American science fiction writer and astronomer. He began writing in 1980.

== Biography ==
Born Michael Sean Brotherton in Granite City, Illinois, he grew up in St. Louis, Missouri, where he graduated from the John Burroughs School in 1986. He then headed south for college, attending Rice University, from where he graduated magna cum laude in 1990 with a BS in electrical engineering. He remained in Texas, going to the University of Texas at Austin for graduate work in astronomy, where he specialized in studying quasars under Beverly Wills, earning his PhD in 1996. From 1996 to 1999 he was a postdoctoral fellow at the Institute of Geophysics and Planetary Physics at Lawrence Livermore National Laboratory working primarily with Wil van Breguel and Robert Becker on the Very Large Array's FIRST survey related projects. From 1999-2002, he was a postdoctoral researcher at the National Optical Astronomy Observatory and FUSE Science Team Associate working with Richard Green in Tucson, Arizona. He is currently a tenured professor of astronomy at the University of Wyoming at Laramie, where he has been since 2002.

== Work ==
Brotherton writes hard science-fiction stories. Combining his interest in science fiction writing and astronomy, he founded the NASA-funded Launch Pad Astronomy Workshop for Writers, which brings a dozen award-winning professional writers to Wyoming every summer. His primary goal with this program is to teach writers, editors, and those with audiences of all types about modern science, specifically astronomy, and in turn reach their audiences.

=== Fiction ===
- Star Dragon (2003)
- Spider Star (2008)
- Diamonds in the Sky (2009)

=== Short fiction ===
- "Jack in the Box" (1995)
- "Rusted Roots" (1996)
- "Pearl" (1997)
- "The Point" (2009)
- "The Pack and the Pickup Artist" (2010)
- "Science Fiction by Scientists" (Editor, 2017)

== Research ==
Brotherton's specialty is studying supermassive black holes in the centers of galaxies and how they shine when in their active phase. Brotherton's research seeks to improve our understanding of active galactic nuclei and their relationship to host galaxies, and their mutual evolution. His work is primarily observational in nature, the bulk of which rests on optical and infrared spectroscopy. He uses a wide assortment of telescopes/observatories operating across the electromagnetic spectrum including the Chandra X-ray Observatory, XMM-Newton, Far Ultraviolet Spectroscopic Explorer (FUSE), the Hubble Space Telescope, the Infrared Telescope Facility, and the Very Large Array, and optical telescopes including Keck, Lick, and Kitt Peak. He works both on large samples that enable the phenomenology to be explored for an entire active galactic nuclei population, as well as individual objects of special interest that may reveal important physics because of their extreme nature.
