= Darwin's Radio =

1999 science fiction novel by Greg Bear

- Cover of first edition (hardcover)
- Author: Greg Bear
- Language: English
- Series: Darwin series
- Genre: Science fiction novel
- Publisher: Del Rey
- Publication date: 31 August 1999
- Publication place: United States
- Media type: Print (hardback & paperback)
- Pages: 448
- ISBN: 0-345-42333-X
- OCLC: 40940104
- Dewey Decimal: 813/.54 21
- LC Class: PS3552.E157 D43 1999
- Followed by: Darwin's Children

Darwin's Radio is a 1999 science fiction novel by Greg Bear. It won the Nebula Award in 2000 for Best Novel and the 2000 Endeavour Award. It was also nominated for the Hugo Award, Locus and Campbell Awards the same year.

The novel's original tagline was "The next great war will be inside us." It was followed by a sequel, Darwin's Children, in 2003.

== Plot summary ==
In the novel, a new form of endogenous retrovirus has emerged, SHEVA. It controls human evolution by rapidly evolving the next generation while it is in the womb, leading to speciation.

The novel follows several characters as the "plague" is discovered as well as the panicked reaction of the public and the US government to the disease.

Built into the human genome are non-coding sequences of DNA called introns. Certain portions of those "nonsense" sequences, remnants of prehistoric retroviruses, have been activated and are translating numerous LPCs (large protein complexes). The activation of SHEVA and its consequential sudden speciation was postulated to be controlled by a complex genetic network that perceives a need for modification or to be a human adaptive response to overcrowding. The disease, or rather, gene activation, is passed on laterally from male to female as per an STD. If impregnated, a woman in her first trimester who has contracted SHEVA will miscarry a deformed female fetus made of little more than two ovaries. This "first stage fetus" leaves behind a fertilized egg with 52 chromosomes, rather than the typical 46 characteristic of Homo sapiens sapiens.

During the third trimester of the second-stage pregnancy, both parents go into a pre-speciation puberty to prepare them for the needs of their novel child. Facial pigmentation changes underneath the old skin which begins sloughing off like a mask. Vocal organs alter and olfactory glands sensitize to adapt for a new form of communication. For over a year after the first SHEVA outbreak in the United States, no second-stage fetus is recorded to have been born alive. The new human species is highly sensitive to all varieties of herpes and cannot be viably born to a mother who has ever been infected with any of the virus's many forms, including Epstein-Barr and the chickenpox, thus eliminating 95% of the female population. Anesthetics and pitocin administered during childbirth are also lethal. Thus, while many women contract activated SHEVA, few manage to give birth, making the transition from Homo sapiens sapiens to the new human species very gradual.

The international response to the threat of SHEVA is to form a special task force that works alongside the Centers for Disease Control and Prevention (CDC) to find a vaccine. Because the "disease", called "Herod's Flu", is already in the genome of every person on Earth, the only two options are to inhibit the activation of the SHEVA gene by discovering the signal it used or to abort the second-stage fetus. Due to the rapid mutation rate of the missing-link signal molecule, preventing the activation of the gene is infeasible.

The second option, abortion, was already a controversial issue, and the proposal of handing out free RU 486 is met with social upheaval, adding to the already-chaotic social scene. The general public believes that the government is not placing due importance on the death of countless fetuses or that it already has a cure and refuses to release it. In response, government research facilities are forced to test prospective treatments prematurely and cannot pursue explanations for SHEVA outside of the "disease" category because of the potential reactions from the masses. It is not until viable second-stage fetuses are born that the idea of SHEVA being a part of evolution rather than a disease begins to grow from a few isolated sources.
