= Hull Zero Three =

2010 novel by Greg Bear

- First edition
- Author: Greg Bear
- Language: English
- Genre: Science fiction novel
- Publisher: Orbit
- Publication date: November 22, 2010
- Publication place: United States
- Media type: Print (Hardback)
- Pages: 320 (Hardcover)
- ISBN: 978-0-316-07281-6

Hull Zero Three is a science fiction novel by American author Greg Bear. It was published on November 22, 2010. It is set on a generation ship that has lost its way under mysterious circumstances.

Opening moments of bliss quickly give way to fear and confusion. Control of the ship is then contested within jarring, short sections.

== Plot ==
A man wakes up from a dream-like state, naked and freezing, with no memory. A little girl leads him through a series of corridors in a generation ship in search of warmth. She calls him Teacher, and together they encounter several other strange beings as they travel through the ship trying to survive and find the answers to their questions.

Teacher eventually finds out that he is a clone and has been resurrected several times before, although those versions did not survive. Each clone was able to leave bits of information, a kind of breadcrumb trail for the next iteration. It is from these diaries that Teacher discovers the true nature of his situation. His companions are clones as well, genetically engineered for specific purposes.

The ship's crew has separated into two groups, each vying for control of the ship. One faction wants to abandon their mission to colonize a planet which is already teeming with life, while the other wants to press forward. The ship is damaged during one of their battles, and the clones have been created in order to fix it.

Teacher, who discovers his real name is Sanjay, eventually reaches the third hull of the book's title where he encounters Mother, who is the leader of the faction that wants to continue to their destination. She tells him she created him to be her ally. In the end, Teacher and his companions flee from Mother and await their arrival on the new planet.

== Critical reception ==
Chris Hsiang summarizes the overall impact of the book as "...less than thrilling but I've come to expect this from Greg Bear: he is often more concerned with the journey than the destination. The Mystery in Space of Hull Zero Three is more personal and at the same time very universal. When you look past all the action and exotic scenery Teacher's turmoil boils down to, 'Who am I and why are we here?' We may never get the full answer but these are the kind of questions we all have to ask." Similarly, the book has been described by Harriet Klausner of Alternative Worlds as a "science fiction thriller that adds very little new to the generational ark in space subgenre". The Science Fact and Science Fiction Concatenation describes the novel as "near-mundane SF in the form of the interstellar space craft and hard SF biology of its occupants whose survival is threatened".
