= Quantico (novel) =

2005 novel by Greg Bear

- First edition cover
- Author: Greg Bear
- Genre: Science fiction; Thriller
- Publisher: Perseus
- Publication date: 2005
- ISBN: 978-1-59315-445-5
- Followed by: Mariposa (2009)

Quantico is a 2005 science fiction/thriller novel by American writer Greg Bear. The novel concerns a group of FBI agents trying to prevent a massive bioterrorist attack. A sequel, Mariposa, was published in 2009.

== Plot synopsis ==
There has been another 9-11 scale terrorist attack on the United States, this time on October 4, an attack on a Washington State ferry carried out after the destruction of the Dome of the Rock mosque in Jerusalem by a Jewish bomber.

A new alphabet soup of agencies have sprung up, including the Bureau of Domestic Intelligence and the mysterious BuDark. It is a time when news of the capture of the 2001 Amerithrax perpetrator is overshadowed the next day by a NUCDET in the Iranian Tactical Area of Responsibility:

In post 10-4 America homegrown bio-hackers create real viruses, not computer ones, while Sunni factions in Iraq test the results on captured Jews and Shiites. Genes are spliced into yeast to create airborne mad cow disease, and dispersed by ordinary fireworks from the back of a truck. Specific trucks are taken out in Mecca during the Hajj by steel telephone poles called Rods from God, dropped from orbit, guided by lasers, to drive them into holes and vaporize them before they can release their deadly cargo. Israel starts assassinating the extended families of suicide bombers, but still they come.

While the House of Saud is overthrown by a US backed coalition of Arabs in a "controlled burn" revolution, hoping to keep the oil flowing, liberals in Congress, backed by Madam President and incensed by the discovery of "patriot files" on them systematically dismantle the FBI even as the final class of agents undergo training at the FBI Academy on the Quantico Marine Corps Base in Virginia.

== Reception ==
A reviewer for Publishers Weekly called the novel a "thought-provoking near-future thriller."

== Reviews ==
- Review by Gary K. Wolfe (2006) in Locus, #540 January 2006
- Review by Alan Fraser (2006) in Vector 247
- Review by uncredited (2006) in Vector 249
- Review by Thomas A. Easton [as by Tom Easton] (2006) in Analog Science Fiction and Fact, December 2006
