= Moving Mars =

1993 novel by Greg Bear

- Cover of first edition (hardcover)
- Author: Greg Bear
- Language: English
- Genre: Science fiction novel
- Publisher: Tor Books
- Publication date: 1993
- Publication place: United States
- Media type: Print (hardback & paperback)
- Pages: 448
- ISBN: 0-312-85515-X
- OCLC: 28422079
- Dewey Decimal: 813/.54 20
- LC Class: PS3552.E157 M68 1993

Flag of the Federal Republic of Mars, as described in the book

Moving Mars is a science fiction novel written by Greg Bear. Published in 1993, it won the 1994 Nebula Award for Best Novel, and was also nominated for the 1994 Hugo, Locus, and John W. Campbell Memorial Awards, each in the same category. The main focus of Moving Mars is the coming of age and development of Casseia Majumdar, the narrator, as political tensions over revolutionary scientific discoveries build between Earth and Martian factions, and Mars tries to unify itself.

== Background ==
=== Martian politics ===
The "Triple" is the combined economy of Earth, the Moon, and Mars. On Mars the first colonists formed families, which developed into larger family-units called Binding Multiples (BMs). The BMs were fashioned after the Lunar system, and are being threatened to be toppled out of power by Statists, people who want a unified Mars under a centralized government. The Earth wants Mars to unify in order to improve trade within the Triple, but many Martians prefer their independence, and see the Earth's proposal as a thinly veiled attempt at control.

=== Thinkers ===
Thinkers are artificial intelligences given human traits that allow them to have conversations with people. The most advanced are Quantum Logic Thinkers, or QL Thinkers, which are hugely intelligent, but whose thought processes (based on quantum mechanics) are somewhat alien to most people. Thinkers are used in many disciplines, although almost all Thinkers are manufactured on Earth, giving Earth leverage over Mars.

== Plot ==
A small number of students, who are angry at the breaking of their contract with the University of Mars, Sinai, start a protest and plan to storm the university. Although the attempted coup ends in a stalemate, a protester, Casseia Majumdar, establishes her position. The story picks up again a few years later when Casseia is more mature. She does not necessarily regret her actions in the attempted revolution, but continues to be haunted by their consequences, especially her love affair with fellow student Charles Franklin.

Casseia eventually emerges as a fledgling politician in her BM, and wins a trip to Earth with her BM's representative and the BM's Thinker to discuss the situation between Earth and Mars, which is getting increasingly worse. Meanwhile, Charles, her one-time lover, along with a team of super-geniuses called the Olympians, discovers a radical new technology that has the potential to turn the tables on the conflict. He theorizes that the universe is basically a large computer and discovers a way to "tweak" the laws of the universe to create an effect. The Earth does not know exactly what this new technology can do, but they have hints of it and fear it. Casseia returns to Mars and marries into a family with potentially political ambitions due to their perceived neutrality. Her mother-in-law eventually becomes president of an interim central Martian government, and chooses Casseia as her vice-president. Tensions between the BMs and Earth grow to crisis levels, as news of the Olympians' discovery frightens the Earth government into pressuring the Martians to cooperate. One method of coercion that the Martians fear is "evolvons", or small undetectable computer viruses implanted during manufacture into all Thinkers. Martians fear that the Earth will use these to control all Martian Thinkers, and therefore cripple essential operations.

While the tension between Earth and Mars builds, the Olympians, led by Charles Franklin, reveal to Casseia that they have the ability to instantly move anything an infinite distance or to redefine the properties of an object by "tweaking" the properties of an object, with the help of a QL Thinker. The ramifications of this become clear to Casseia and the leaders of the interim government immediately, but they so fear its power that they refuse to use it as anything but a last resort. Charles is convinced that "tweaking", as the technique is called, is the solution, and orders a QL Thinker to speed up the process. Eventually, he is able to test his technique by converting part of a substance into an 'anti-matter' of its properties.

The test shows everyone on Earth what the potential of this breakthrough really is, and Earth fears the power it gives the Martians. They double their efforts to duplicate the technology and eventually activate the evolvons, creating chaos on Mars but also uniting it against the Earth. Earth then demands that Mars government allow them to take over and place themselves into a junior relationship status. Martians retaliate by moving the moon Phobos into Earth orbit to demonstrate their ability to respond, but this only escalates the conflict. Earth withdraws their demands but now are racing to duplicate the technology they now know is possible. Charles is able to test the moving object technique by linking his mind to a QL Thinker and using Phobos as a base, visits a planetary system to investigate as a new potential home for moving Mars to. Casseia travels along with his team as the government representative. The test goes well, but with Charles' mind linked to the QL Thinker, it nearly ends in disaster when the QL Thinker becomes distracted trying to test other "truths". While connected to the Thinker, the raw intelligence of the Thinker imposes its intellectual will on Charles, and tempts him to test every use of this technique, these "truths", even those that would be destructive.

Shortly after the planetary system visit, Earth invades Mars with nanotech robots that kill the Martian President, leaving Casseia as the one in charge. Under attack and with no hope of fighting back, she makes the decision to go along with Charles Franklin's desperate plan to completely remove Mars from the Solar System and place it in orbit around a star 10,000 light-years away. To do it, Charles Franklin must connect his mind to the QL Thinker again. The same temptation as in the first test nearly overcomes Charles' willpower; he prevails, but it costs him his mind. The novel ends with an aged Casseia looking at the new Martian sky and hoping that the decision she made was the right one.
