= Greg Bear =

American writer and illustrator (1951–2022)

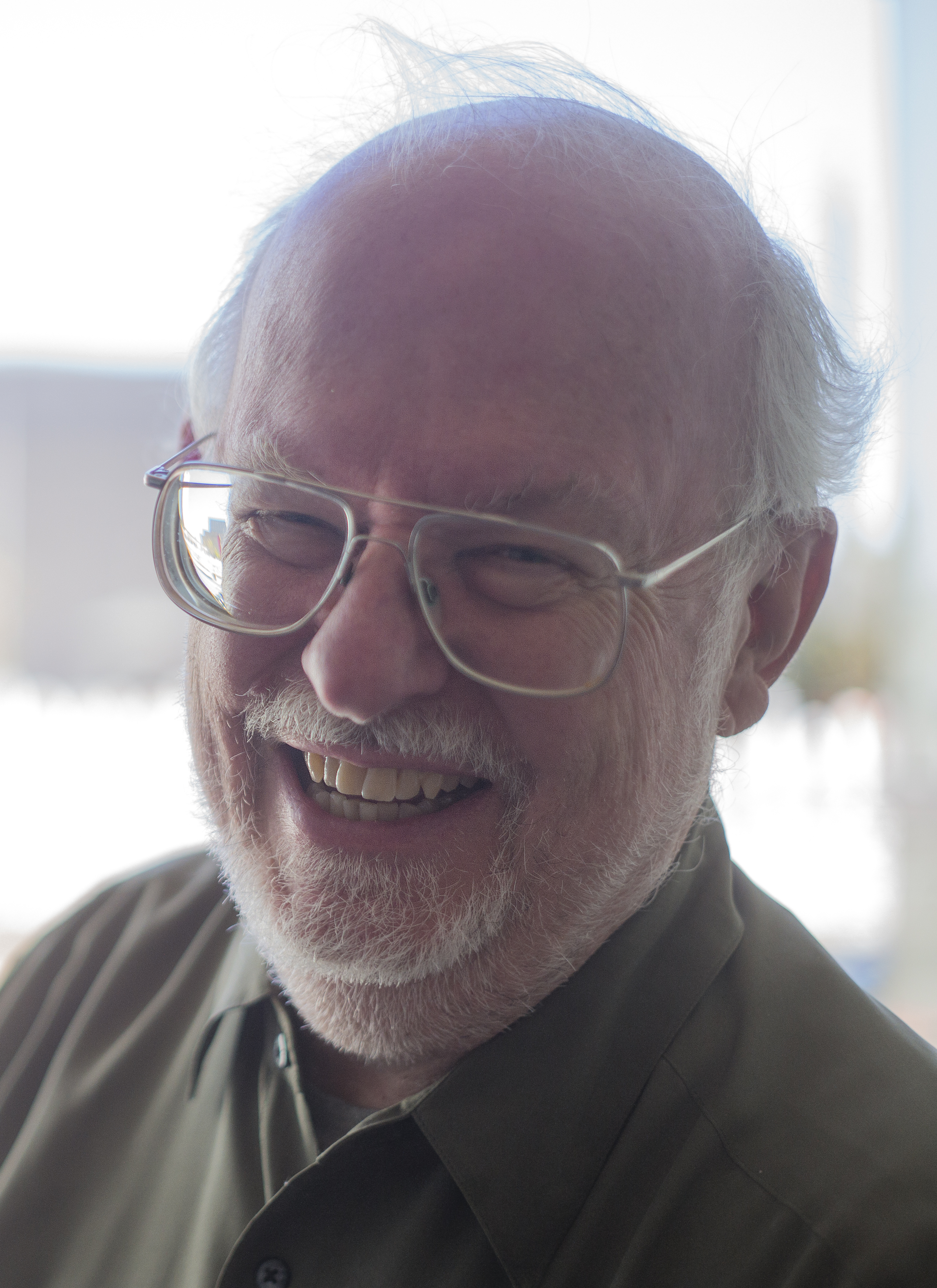
- Bear in 2016
- Born: Gregory Dale Bear; August 20, 1951; San Diego, California, U.S.
- Died: November 19, 2022 (aged 71)
- Education: San Diego State University (BA)
- Occupation: Novelist
- Writing career
- Genres: Science fiction, Speculative fiction
- Notable works: Blood Music (1985); Eon (1985); The Forge of God (1987); Queen of Angels (1990)
- Website: gregbear.com

Gregory Dale Bear (August 20, 1951 – November 19, 2022) was an American science fiction writer. His work covered themes of conflict, consciousness, and accelerated evolution. The Forge of God and Anvil of Stars established his reputation. As time went on these works were rolled into lengthier trilogies and series. Along with Forge, popular series have included parallel universes in The Way and evolutionary themes in Darwin's Children.

He won numerous awards over the course of his career. His most awarded novel was Moving Mars, which won a Nebula Award. His last work was the 2021 novel The Unfinished Land. Greg Bear wrote over 50 books in total. He was one of the five co-founders of San Diego Comic-Con.

== Early life and career ==
Greg Bear was born in San Diego, California. He attended San Diego State University (1968–1973), where he received a Bachelor of Arts degree. At the university, he was a teaching assistant to Elizabeth Chater in her course on science fiction writing.

Bear is often classified as a hard science fiction author because of the level of scientific detail in his work. Early in his career, he also published work as an artist, including illustrations for an early version of the reference book Star Trek Concordance and covers for periodicals Galaxy and F&SF. He sold his first story, "Destroyers", to Famous Science Fiction in 1967.

== Major works ==
=== Forge and Anvil ===
In his fiction, Bear often addresses major questions in contemporary science and culture and proposes solutions. The Forge of God offers an explanation for the Fermi paradox, supposing that the galaxy is filled with potentially predatory intelligences and that young civilizations that survive are those that do not attract their attention but stay quiet. Its sequel, Anvil of Stars, postulates a physics based on information exchange between particles capable of being altered at the "bit level." (Note: Bear has credited the inspiration for the idea to Frederick Kantor's 1967 treatise "Information Mechanics" (see Digital physics).)

=== Blood Music, Moving Mars, and Darwin's Children ===
One of Bear's favorite themes is reality as a function of observation. In Blood Music, reality becomes unstable as the number of observers (trillions of intelligent single-cell organisms) spirals higher and higher. In Moving Mars such knowledge is used to remove Mars from the Solar System and transfer it to an orbit around a distant star. Blood Music was first published as a short story (1983) and then expanded to a novel (1985) features nanotechnology.

In a short series comprising Darwin's Children and Darwin's Radio, Bear addresses the problem of overpopulation by considering a mutation event that allows for a new series of human beings. The question of cultural acceptance of something new and unavoidable is a prevalent theme. The books follow a family over a decade as they deal with the fallout from the virus event.

=== The Way and Queen of Angels ===
The Way novel series is composed of a trilogy and a prequel written from 1985 to 1999. Bear explores the idea of "constructors" visiting Earth through a mysterious artifact, the Thistledown. Bear uses Cold War politics as a backdrop. In later works, beginning with Queen of Angels and its sequel Slant, (Note: Also rendered stylistically as /) Bear gives a detailed description of a near-future nanotechnological society. This historical sequence continues with Heads—which may contain the first description of a so-called "quantum logic computer"—and with Moving Mars. The sequence also charts the historical development of self-awareness in artificial intelligence. In the series, Bear examines crime, guilt, and punishment in society. He frames these questions around an examination of consciousness and awareness, including the emergent self-awareness of highly advanced computers in communication with humans.

=== Other works ===
Queen and Slant's continuing character, Jill, was inspired in part by Robert A. Heinlein's self-aware computer Mycroft HOLMES in The Moon Is a Harsh Mistress (1966). Bear, Gregory Benford, and David Brin wrote a trilogy of prequel novels to Isaac Asimov's Foundation trilogy. Bear wrote the middle book named Foundation and Chaos.

While most of Bear's work is science fiction, he wrote in other fiction genres. Examples include Songs of Earth and Power (fantasy) and Psychlone (horror). Bear described his Dead Lines, which straddles the line between science fiction and fantasy, as a "high-tech ghost story". He received many accolades, including five Nebula Awards and two Hugo Awards. Bear cited Ray Bradbury as the most influential writer in his life. He met Bradbury in 1967 and had a lifelong correspondence. As a teenager, Bear attended Bradbury lectures and events in Southern California.

== Reception ==
Amongst individual books, eReads lists Blood Music most highly and The Way as his greatest series. Bear also served on the Board of Advisors for the Museum of Science Fiction. He was one of the five co-founders of San Diego Comic-Con, an event popular amongst fans.

In addition, Bear was also a singular award winner of the 1984 Inkpot Award, the 2006 Robert A. Heinlein Award, the 2017 "Forry Award" for lifetime achievement & the Science Fiction and Fantasy Writers Association's 2022 Kate Wilhelm Solstice Award.

Bear has been praised both for his optimism and his realism. One reviewer of Blood Music said it would bring cheers to the scientists for having a nerd save the world but that "apocalypse is a true apocalypse not a wish." Doris Lessing, winner of the 2007 Nobel Prize in literature, wrote, "I also admire the classic sort of science fiction, like Blood Music, by Greg Bear. He's a great writer." The 2024 novel Halo: Epitaph, a continuation of Bear's Forerunner Saga, was dedicated to Bear's memory by author Kelly Gay.

== Personal life and death ==
In 1975, Bear married Christina M. Nielson; they divorced in 1981. In 1983, he married Astrid Anderson, the daughter of the science fiction and fantasy authors Poul and Karen Anderson. They had two children, Chloe and Alexandra, and resided near Seattle, Washington. Bear died on November 19, 2022, at the age of 71, from multiple strokes, caused by clots that had been concealed in a false lumen of the anterior artery to the brain since a surgery in 2014. After he had been on life support for two days and was not expected to recover, per his advance healthcare directive, life support was withdrawn.

== Awards and accolades ==
Work	Year & Award	Category	Result	Ref.
The Venging	1976 Locus Award	Novelette	Nominated	
Schrödinger's Plague	1982 Analog Award	Short Story	4th Place	
Petra	1983 Locus Award	Short Story	Nominated	
Petra	1983 World Fantasy Award	Short Fiction	Nominated	
Petra	1983 Nebula Award	Short Story	Nominated	
Petra	1983 SF Chronicle Award	Short Story	Won	
Blood Music	1984 Locus Award	Novelette	Nominated	
Blood Music	1984 Hugo Award	Novelette	Won	
Blood Music	1984 Nebula Award	Novelette	Won	
Blood Music	1986 Locus Award	SF Novel	Nominated	
Blood Music	1986 Hugo Award	Novel	Nominated	
Blood Music	1986 John W. Campbell Memorial Award	Science Fiction Novel	Nominated	
Blood Music	1986 Prix Apollo Award	-	Won	
Blood Music	1986 BSFA Award	Novel	Nominated	
Blood Music	1986 Nebula Award	Novel	Nominated	
Blood Music	1988 Tähtivaeltaja Award	-	Won	
Tangents	1987 Locus Award	Short Story	Nominated	
Tangents	1987 Hugo Award	Short Story	Won	
Tangents	1987 Nebula Award	Short Story	Won	
Tangents	1987 SF Chronicle Award	Short Story	Nominated	
Tangents	1990 Locus Award	Collection	Nominated	
Tangents	1994 Seiun Award	Best Translated Short Story	Won	
Tangents	1998 Kurd Laßwitz Award	Foreign Work	Nominated	
Hardfought	1984 Locus Award	Novella	Nominated	
Hardfought	1984 Hugo Award	Novella	Nominated	
Hardfought	1984 SF Chronicle Award	Novella	Nominated	
Hardfought	1984 Nebula Award	Novella	Won	
Eon	1986 Locus	SF Novel	Nominated	
Eon	1987 Arthur C. Clarke Award	-	Finalist	
The Infinity Concerto	1985 Locus Award	Fantasy Novel	Nominated	
The Wind from a Burning Woman	1983 Locus Award	Collection	Nominated	
The Serpent Mage	1987 Locus Award	Fantasy Novel	Nominated	
The Forge of God	1988 Locus Award	SF Novel	Nominated	
The Forge of God	1988 Hugo Award	Novel	Nominated	
The Forge of God	1988 Nebula Award	Novel	Nominated	
Eternity	1989 Locus Award	SF Novel	Nominated	
Sisters	1990 Locus Award	Novelette	Nominated	
Sisters	1990 Nebula Award	Novelette	Nominated	
Sleepside Story	1990 Locus Award	Novelette	Nominated	
Heads	1991 Interzone Readers Poll	Fiction	4th Place	
Heads	1991 Locus Award	Novella	Nominated	
Heads	1996 Hayakawa's S-F Magazine Reader's Award	Foreign Short Story	Won	
Heads	1996 Kurd Laßwitz Award	Foreign Work	Nominated	
Heads	1997 Seiun Award	Translated Short Story	Won	
Queen of Angels	1991 Locus Award	SF Novel	Nominated	
Queen of Angels	1991 John W. Campbell Memorial Award	Science Fiction Novel	Nominated	
Queen of Angels	1991 Hugo Award	Novel	Nominated	
Bear's Fantasies	1993 World Fantasy Award	Collection	Nominated	
Anvil of Stars	1993 Locus Award	SF Novel	Nominated	
Moving Mars	1994 Locus Award	SF Novel	Nominated	
Moving Mars	1994 Hugo Award	Novel	Nominated	
Moving Mars	1994 John W. Campbell Memorial Award	Science Fiction Novel	Nominated	
Moving Mars	1994 SF Chronicle Award	Novel	Won	
Moving Mars	1995 Nebula Award	Novel	Won	
Moving Mars	1996 Premio Ignotus	Foreign Novel	Won	
Moving Mars	1998 Seiun Award	Translated Long Work	Nominated	
Judgement Engine	1996 Locus Award	Novelette	Nominated	
Legacy	1996 Locus Award	SF Novel	Nominated	
Legacy	1998 Grand Prix de l'Imaginaire	Foreign Novel	Nominated	
New Legends	1996 Locus Award	Anthology	Nominated	
Strength of Stones	1997 Kurd Laßwitz Award	Foreign Work	Nominated	
Slant (/)	1998 Locus Award	SF Novel	Nominated	
Slant (/)	1998 John W. Campbell Memorial Award	Science Fiction Novel	Nominated	
Slant (/)	1999 SF Site Readers Poll	SF/Fantasy Book	5th Place	
Slant (/)	2000 Prix Ozone	Foreign SF Novel	Won	
Slant (/)	2002 Kurd Laßwitz Award	Foreign Work	Nominated	
Dinosaur Summer	1998 Sidewise Award for Alternate History	Long Form	Nominated	
Dinosaur Summer	1999 Locus Award	SF Novel	Nominated	
Dinosaur Summer	1999 Endeavour Award	-	Won	
Darwin's Radio	2000 Endeavour Award	Novel or Collection	Won	
Darwin's Radio	2000 John W. Campbell Memorial Award	Science Fiction Novel	Nominated	
Darwin's Radio	2000 Locus Award	SF Novel	Nominated	
Darwin's Radio	2000 Hugo Award	Novel	Nominated	
Darwin's Radio	2001 Seiun Award	Translated Long Work	Nominated	
Darwin's Radio	2001 Nebula Award	Novel	Won	
Darwin's Radio	2002 Premio Ignotus	Foreign Novel	Nominated	
The Way of All Ghosts	2000 Locus Award	Novella	Nominated	
The Collected Stories of Greg Bear	2003 Locus Award	Collection	Nominated	
Vitals	2003 Locus Award	SF Novel	Nominated	
Vitals	2003 John W. Campbell Memorial Award	Science Fiction Novel	Finalist	
Darwin's Children	2004 John W. Campbell Memorial Award	Science Fiction Novel	Finalist	
Darwin's Children	2004 Audie Awards	Science Fiction	Nominated	
Darwin's Children	2004 Locus Award	SF Novel	Nominated	
Darwin's Children	2004 Arthur C. Clarke Award	-	Finalist	
Darwin's Children	2005 Kurd Laßwitz Award	Foreign Work	Nominated	
Dead Lines	2005 Locus Award	Fantasy Novel	Nominated	
Quantico	2006 Endeavour Award	-	Nominated	
City at the End of Time	2008 Neffy Awards	Laureate Awards: SF/F Author	Won	
City at the End of Time	2009 Locus Award	SF Novel	Nominated	
City at the End of Time	2009 John W. Campbell Memorial Award	Science Fiction Novel	Finalist	
Hull Zero Three	2011 Locus Award	SF Novel	Nominated	
Hull Zero Three	2011 John W. Campbell Memorial Award	Science Fiction Novel	Finalist	
Hull Zero Three	2012 Arthur C. Clarke Award	-	Nominated	
Hull Zero Three	2012 Kurd Laßwitz Award	Foreign Work	Nominated	
War Dogs	2015 Locus Award	SF Novel	Nominated	
The Machine Starts	2016 Locus Award	Novelette	Nominated	
Take Back the Sky	2017 Locus Award	SF Novel	Nominated	

== Anthologies and critical studies ==
- New Legends (1995, with Martin H. Greenberg)
- Multiverse: Exploring Poul Anderson's Worlds (2014, with Gardner Dozois)
- Nebula Awards Showcase 2015 (2015)

War Dogs

- Sakers, Don (May 2015). "The Reference Library". Analog Science Fiction and Fact. Vol. 135, no. 5. pp. 104–107.

== Bibliography ==
- Forge of God series
- Darwin's Children
- The Way (novel series)
