= Nebula Award for Best Novel =

Science fiction and fantasy literary award

- Awarded for: The best science fiction or fantasy story of 40,000 words or more published in the prior calendar year
- Presented by: Science Fiction and Fantasy Writers Association
- First award: 1966
- Currently held by: Stephen Graham Jones (The Buffalo Hunter Hunter)
- Website: nebulas.sfwa.org

The Nebula Award for Best Novel is given each year by the Science Fiction and Fantasy Writers Association (SFWA) for science fiction or fantasy novels. A work of fiction is considered a novel by the organization if it is 40,000 words or longer; awards are also given out for pieces of shorter lengths, in the categories of short story, novelette, and novella. To be eligible for Nebula Award consideration, a novel must have been published in English in the US. Works published in English elsewhere in the world are also eligible, provided they are released on either a website or in an electronic edition. The award has been given annually since 1966. Novels which were expanded forms of previously published stories are eligible, and novellas published individually can be considered as novels if the author requests it. The award has been described as one of "the most important of the American science fiction awards" and "the science-fiction and fantasy equivalent" of the Emmy Awards.

Nebula Award nominees and winners are chosen by members of SFWA, though the authors nominated do not need to be members. Works are nominated each year by members in a period around December 15 through January 31, and the six works that receive the most nominations then form the final ballot, with additional nominees possible in the case of ties. Soon after, members are given a month to vote on the ballot, and the final results are presented at the Nebula Awards ceremony in May. Authors are not permitted to nominate their own works, and ties in the final vote are broken, if possible, by the number of nominations the works received.

Beginning with the 2009 awards, the rules were changed to the current format, and nominated works must have been published during that calendar year. Prior to then, the eligibility period for nominations was defined as being one year after the publication date of the work, which allowed the possibility for works to be nominated in the calendar year after their publication, and then be awarded in the calendar year after that. Under the previous process, works were added to a preliminary list for the year if they had ten or more nominations, which were then voted on to create a final ballot, to which the SFWA organizing panel was also allowed to add an additional work if they felt it was overlooked.

During the 61 nomination years, 209 authors have had works nominated, and 48 of these have won (including co-authors and ties). Ursula K. Le Guin has received the most Nebula Awards for Best Novel, with four wins out of six nominations. Joe Haldeman has received the next most: three awards out of four nominations, while nine other authors have each won twice. Jack McDevitt has the most nominations at twelve (with one win), while Poul Anderson and Philip K. Dick tie for having the most nominations without winning an award, at five each.

== Winners and nominees ==
SFWA currently identifies the awards by the year of publication, that is, the year prior to the year in which the award is given. Entries with a yellow background and an asterisk (*) next to the writer's name have won the award; the other entries are the other nominees on the shortlist.

* Winners and joint winners

Winners and nominees
Year	Author	Novel	Publisher or publication	Ref.
1965	Frank Herbert*	Dune	Chilton Company	
1965	Clifford D. Simak	All Flesh is Grass	Doubleday	
1965	Theodore L. Thomas	The Clone	Berkley Books	
1965	Kate Wilhelm	The Clone	Berkley Books	
1965	Philip K. Dick	Dr. Bloodmoney, or How We Got Along After the Bomb	Ace Books	
1965	James White	The Escape Orbit	Ace Books	
1965	Thomas M. Disch	The Genocides	Berkley Books	
1965	William S. Burroughs	Nova Express	Grove Press	
1965	Keith Laumer	A Plague of Demons	Berkley Books	
1965	Avram Davidson	Rogue Dragon	Ace Books	
1965	G. C. Edmondson	The Ship That Sailed the Time Stream	Ace Books	
1965	Poul Anderson	The Star Fox	Doubleday	
1965	Philip K. Dick	The Three Stigmata of Palmer Eldritch	Doubleday	
1966	Samuel R. Delany*	Babel-17	Ace Books	
1966	Daniel Keyes*	Flowers for Algernon	Harcourt	
1966	Robert A. Heinlein	The Moon Is a Harsh Mistress	Putnam Publishing Group	
1967	Samuel R. Delany*	The Einstein Intersection	Ace Books	
1967	Piers Anthony	Chthon	Ballantine Books	
1967	Hayden Howard	The Eskimo Invasion	Ballantine Books	
1967	Roger Zelazny	Lord of Light	Doubleday	
1967	Robert Silverberg	Thorns	Ballantine Books	
1968	Alexei Panshin*	Rite of Passage	Ace Books	
1968	James Blish	Black Easter	Doubleday	
1968	Philip K. Dick	Do Androids Dream of Electric Sheep?	Doubleday	
1968	Robert Silverberg	The Masks of Time	Ballantine Books	
1968	R. A. Lafferty	Past Master	Ace Books	
1968	Joanna Russ	Picnic on Paradise	Ace Books	
1968	John Brunner	Stand on Zanzibar	Doubleday	
1969	Ursula K. Le Guin*	The Left Hand of Darkness	Ace Books	
1969	Norman Spinrad	Bug Jack Barron	Avon	
1969	Roger Zelazny	Isle of the Dead	Ace Books	
1969	John Brunner	The Jagged Orbit	Ace Books	
1969	Kurt Vonnegut	Slaughterhouse-Five	Delacorte Press	
1969	Robert Silverberg	Up the Line	Ballantine Books	
1970	Larry Niven*	Ringworld	Ballantine Books	
1970	Joanna Russ	And Chaos Died	Ace Books	
1970	R. A. Lafferty	Fourth Mansions	Ace Books	
1970	David G. Compton	The Steel Crocodile	Ace Books	
1970	Robert Silverberg	Tower of Glass	Charles Scribner's Sons	
1970	Wilson Tucker	The Year of the Quiet Sun	Ace Books	
1971	Robert Silverberg*	A Time of Changes	Galaxy Science Fiction	
1971	Poul Anderson	The Byworlder	Fantastic	
1971	R. A. Lafferty	The Devil is Dead	Avon Publications	
1971	T. J. Bass	Half Past Human	Ballantine Books	
1971	Ursula K. Le Guin	The Lathe of Heaven	Amazing Stories	
1971	Kate Wilhelm	Margaret and I	Little, Brown and Company	
1972	Isaac Asimov*	The Gods Themselves	Galaxy Science Fiction	
1972	Robert Silverberg	The Book of Skulls	Charles Scribner's Sons	
1972	Robert Silverberg	Dying Inside	Galaxy Science Fiction	
1972	Norman Spinrad	The Iron Dream	Avon	
1972	John Brunner	The Sheep Look Up	Harper & Row	
1972	George Alec Effinger	What Entropy Means to Me	Doubleday	
1972	David Gerrold	When HARLIE Was One	Ballantine Books	
1973	Arthur C. Clarke*	Rendezvous with Rama	Galaxy Science Fiction	
1973	Thomas Pynchon	Gravity's Rainbow	Viking Press	
1973	David Gerrold	The Man Who Folded Himself	Random House	
1973	Poul Anderson	The People of the Wind	Analog Science Fact & Fiction	
1973	Robert A. Heinlein	Time Enough for Love	Putnam Publishing Group	
1974	Ursula K. Le Guin*	The Dispossessed	Harper & Row	
1974	Thomas M. Disch	334	Avon	
1974	Philip K. Dick	Flow My Tears, the Policeman Said	Doubleday	
1974	T. J. Bass	The Godwhale	Ballantine Books	
1975	Joe Haldeman*	The Forever War	St. Martin's Press	
1975	Arthur Byron Cover	Autumn Angels	Pyramid Books	
1975	Tanith Lee	The Birthgrave	DAW Books	
1975	Alfred Bester	The Computer Connection	Analog Science Fact & Fiction	
1975	Samuel R. Delany	Dhalgren	Bantam Books	
1975	Roger Zelazny	Doorways in the Sand	Analog Science Fact & Fiction	
1975	Ian Watson	The Embedding	Charles Scribner's Sons	
1975	Vonda N. McIntyre	The Exile Waiting	Nelson Doubleday	
1975	Joanna Russ	The Female Man	Bantam Books	
1975	Michael Bishop	A Funeral for the Eyes of Fire	Ballantine Books	
1975	Barry N. Malzberg	Guernica Night	Bobbs-Merrill Company	
1975	Marion Zimmer Bradley	The Heritage of Hastur	DAW Books	
1975	Italo Calvino	Invisible Cities	Harcourt Brace Jovanovich	
1975	Poul Anderson	A Midsummer Tempest	Doubleday	
1975	Katherine MacLean	Missing Man	Berkley Books	
1975	Larry Niven	The Mote in God's Eye	Simon & Schuster	
1975	Jerry Pournelle	The Mote in God's Eye	Simon & Schuster	
1975	E. L. Doctorow	Ragtime	Random House	
1975	Robert Silverberg	The Stochastic Man	The Magazine of Fantasy & Science Fiction	
1976	Frederik Pohl*	Man Plus	The Magazine of Fantasy & Science Fiction	
1976	Larry Niven	Inferno	Pocket Books	
1976	Jerry Pournelle	Inferno	Pocket Books	
1976	Marta Randall	Islands	Pyramid Books	
1976	Robert Silverberg	Shadrach in the Furnace	Bobbs-Merrill Company	
1976	Samuel R. Delany	Triton	Bantam Books	
1976	Kate Wilhelm	Where Late the Sweet Birds Sang	Harper & Row	
1977	Frederik Pohl*	Gateway	Galaxy Science Fiction	
1977	Terry Carr	Cirque	Bobbs-Merrill Company	
1977	Gregory Benford	In the Ocean of Night	Dial Press	
1977	David Gerrold	Moonstar Odyssey	New American Library	
1977	Richard A. Lupoff	Sword of the Demon	Harper & Row	
1978	Vonda N. McIntyre*	Dreamsnake	Houghton Mifflin	
1978	Tom Reamy	Blind Voices	Berkley Books	
1978	C. J. Cherryh	The Faded Sun: Kesrith	Galaxy Science Fiction	
1978	Gore Vidal	Kalki	Random House	
1978	Gardner Dozois	Strangers	Berkley Books	
1979	Arthur C. Clarke*	The Fountains of Paradise	Harcourt Brace Jovanovich	
1979	Frederik Pohl	Jem	St. Martin's Press	
1979	Kate Wilhelm	Juniper Time	Harper & Row	
1979	Thomas M. Disch	On Wings of Song	The Magazine of Fantasy & Science Fiction	
1979	Richard Cowper	The Road to Corlay	Pocket Books	
1979	John Varley	Titan	Berkley Books	
1980	Gregory Benford*	Timescape	Simon & Schuster	
1980	Frederik Pohl	Beyond the Blue Event Horizon	Del Rey Books	
1980	Walter Tevis	Mockingbird	Doubleday	
1980	Robert Stallman	The Orphan	Pocket Books	
1980	Gene Wolfe	The Shadow of the Torturer	Simon & Schuster	
1980	Joan D. Vinge	The Snow Queen	Dial Press	
1981	Gene Wolfe*	The Claw of the Conciliator	Timescape Books	
1981	John Crowley	Little, Big	Bantam Books	
1981	Julian May	The Many-Colored Land	Houghton Mifflin	
1981	A. A. Attanasio	Radix	William Morrow and Company	
1981	Russell Hoban	Riddley Walker	Summit Books	
1981	Suzy McKee Charnas	The Vampire Tapestry	Simon & Schuster	
1982	Michael Bishop*	No Enemy But Time	Timescape Books	
1982	Isaac Asimov	Foundation's Edge	Doubleday	
1982	Robert A. Heinlein	Friday	Holt, Rinehart & Winston	
1982	Brian Aldiss	Helliconia Spring	Atheneum Books	
1982	Gene Wolfe	The Sword of the Lictor	Timescape Books	
1982	Philip K. Dick	The Transmigration of Timothy Archer	Timescape Books	
1983	David Brin*	Startide Rising	Bantam Books	
1983	Gregory Benford	Against Infinity	Timescape Books	
1983	Gene Wolfe	The Citadel of the Autarch	Timescape Books	
1983	Jack Vance	Lyonesse	Berkley Books	
1983	R. A. MacAvoy	Tea with the Black Dragon	Bantam Books	
1983	Norman Spinrad	The Void Captain's Tale	Timescape Books	
1984	William Gibson*	Neuromancer	Ace Books	
1984	Lewis Shiner	Frontera	Baen Books	
1984	Larry Niven	The Integral Trees	Del Rey Books	
1984	Robert A. Heinlein	Job: A Comedy of Justice	Del Rey Books	
1984	Jack Dann	The Man Who Melted	Bluejay Books	
1984	Kim Stanley Robinson	The Wild Shore	Ace Books	
1985	Orson Scott Card*	Ender's Game	Tor Books	
1985	Greg Bear	Blood Music	Arbor House	
1985	Tim Powers	Dinner at Deviant's Palace	Ace Books	
1985	Brian Aldiss	Helliconia Winter	Atheneum Books	
1985	David Brin	The Postman	Bantam Spectra	
1985	Barry N. Malzberg	The Remaking of Sigmund Freud	Del Rey Books	
1985	Bruce Sterling	Schismatrix	Arbor House	
1986	Orson Scott Card*	Speaker for the Dead	Tor Books	
1986	William Gibson	Count Zero	Asimov's Science Fiction	
1986	Gene Wolfe	Free Live Free	Tor Books	
1986	Margaret Atwood	The Handmaid's Tale	Houghton Mifflin	
1986	Leigh Kennedy	The Journal of Nicholas the American	Atlantic Monthly Press	
1986	James K. Morrow	This Is the Way the World Ends	Henry Holt and Company	
1987	Pat Murphy*	The Falling Woman	Tor Books	
1987	Greg Bear	The Forge of God	Tor Books	
1987	Gene Wolfe	Soldier of the Mist	Tor Books	
1987	David Brin	The Uplift War	Bantam Spectra	
1987	Avram Davidson	Vergil in Averno	Doubleday	
1987	George Alec Effinger	When Gravity Fails	Arbor House	
1988	Lois McMaster Bujold*	Falling Free	Analog Science Fact & Fiction	
1988	Lewis Shiner	Deserted Cities of the Heart	Doubleday Foundation	
1988	George Turner	Drowning Towers	Arbor House	
1988	Gregory Benford	Great Sky River	Bantam Spectra	
1988	William Gibson	Mona Lisa Overdrive	Bantam Spectra	
1988	Orson Scott Card	Red Prophet	Tor Books	
1988	Gene Wolfe	The Urth of the New Sun	Tor Books	
1989	Elizabeth Ann Scarborough*	The Healer's War	Doubleday Foundation	
1989	Poul Anderson	The Boat of a Million Years	Tor Books	
1989	Orson Scott Card	Prentice Alvin	Tor Books	
1989	John Kessel	Good News From Outer Space	Tor Books	
1989	Mike Resnick	Ivory: A Legend of Past and Future	Tor Books	
1989	Jane Yolen	Sister Light, Sister Dark	Tor Books	
1990	Ursula K. Le Guin*	Tehanu: The Last Book of Earthsea	Macmillan Publishers	
1990	Valerie Martin	Mary Reilly	Doubleday Foundation	
1990	James K. Morrow	Only Begotten Daughter	Doubleday	
1990	Dan Simmons	The Fall of Hyperion	William Morrow and Company	
1990	John E. Stith	Redshift Rendezvous	Ace Books	
1990	Jane Yolen	White Jenna	Tor Books	
1991	Michael Swanwick*	Stations of the Tide	Asimov's Science Fiction	
1991	John Barnes	Orbital Resonance	Tor Books	
1991	Lois McMaster Bujold	Barrayar	Analog Science Fact & Fiction	
1991	Emma Bull	Bone Dance	Ace Books	
1991	Pat Cadigan	Synners	Bantam Spectra	
1991	Bruce Sterling	The Difference Engine	Bantam Spectra	
1991	William Gibson	The Difference Engine	Bantam Spectra	
1992	Connie Willis*	Doomsday Book	Bantam Spectra	
1992	John Barnes	A Million Open Doors	Tor Books	
1992	Karen Joy Fowler	Sarah Canary	Henry Holt and Company	
1992	Maureen F. McHugh	China Mountain Zhang	Tor Books	
1992	Vernor Vinge	A Fire Upon the Deep	Tor Books	
1992	Jane Yolen	Briar Rose	Tor Books	
1993	Kim Stanley Robinson*	Red Mars	Bantam Spectra	
1993	Kevin J. Anderson	Assemblers of Infinity	Analog Science Fiction and Fact	
1993	Doug Beason	Assemblers of Infinity	Analog Science Fiction and Fact	
1993	Algis Budrys	Hard Landing	Fantasy & Science Fiction	
1993	Nancy Kress	Beggars in Spain	Morrow AvoNova	
1993	Gene Wolfe	Nightside the Long Sun	Tor Books	
1994	Greg Bear*	Moving Mars	Tor Books	
1994	Octavia E. Butler	Parable of the Sower	Four Walls Eight Windows	
1994	Jonathan Lethem	Gun, with Occasional Music	Harcourt Brace	
1994	James K. Morrow	Towing Jehovah	Harcourt Brace	
1994	Rachel Pollack	Temporary Agency	St. Martin's Press	
1994	Kim Stanley Robinson	Green Mars	Bantam Spectra	
1994	Roger Zelazny	A Night in the Lonesome October	Morrow AvoNova	
1995	Robert J. Sawyer*	The Terminal Experiment	HarperPrism	
1995	John Barnes	Mother of Storms	Tor Books	
1995	Nancy Kress	Beggars and Choosers	Tor Books	
1995	Paul Park	Celestis	Tor Books	
1995	Walter Jon Williams	Metropolitan	HarperPrism	
1995	Gene Wolfe	Calde of the Long Sun	Tor Books	
1996	Nicola Griffith*	Slow River	Del Rey Books	
1996	Nina Kiriki Hoffman	The Silent Strength of Stones	AvoNova	
1996	Patricia A. McKillip	Winter Rose	Ace Books	
1996	Tim Powers	Expiration Date	Tor Books	
1996	Robert J. Sawyer	Starplex	Analog Science Fiction and Fact	
1996	Neal Stephenson	The Diamond Age	Bantam Spectra	
1997	Vonda N. McIntyre*	The Moon and the Sun	Pocket Books	
1997	Lois McMaster Bujold	Memory	Baen Books	
1997	Kate Elliott	King's Dragon	DAW Books	
1997	George R. R. Martin	A Game of Thrones	Bantam Spectra	
1997	Jack McDevitt	Ancient Shores	HarperPrism	
1997	Walter Jon Williams	City on Fire	HarperPrism	
1997	Connie Willis	Bellwether	Bantam Spectra	
1998	Joe Haldeman*	Forever Peace	Ace Books	
1998	Catherine Asaro	The Last Hawk	Tor Books	
1998	Jack McDevitt	Moonfall	HarperPrism	
1998	Harry Turtledove	How Few Remain	Del Rey Books	
1998	Martha Wells	The Death of the Necromancer	Avon	
1998	Connie Willis	To Say Nothing of the Dog	Bantam Spectra	
1999	Octavia E. Butler*	Parable of the Talents	Seven Stories Press	
1999	Ken MacLeod	The Cassini Division	Tor Books	
1999	George R. R. Martin	A Clash of Kings	Bantam Spectra	
1999	Maureen F. McHugh	Mission Child	Avon Eos	
1999	Sean Stewart	Mockingbird	Ace Books	
1999	Vernor Vinge	A Deepness in the Sky	Tor Books	
2000	Greg Bear*	Darwin's Radio	Del Rey Books	
2000	Lois McMaster Bujold	A Civil Campaign	Baen Books	
2000	Kathleen Ann Goonan	Crescent City Rhapsody	Avon Eos	
2000	Nalo Hopkinson	Midnight Robber	Warner Aspect	
2000	Jack McDevitt	Infinity Beach	HarperPrism	
2000	Charles de Lint	Forests of the Heart	Tor Books	
2001	Catherine Asaro*	The Quantum Rose	Tor Books	
2001	Jeffrey Carver	Eternity's End	Tor Books	
2001	Geoffrey A. Landis	Mars Crossing	Tor Books	
2001	George R. R. Martin	A Storm of Swords	Bantam Spectra	
2001	Wil McCarthy	The Collapsium	Del Rey Books	
2001	Patricia A. McKillip	The Tower at Stony Wood	Ace Books	
2001	Tim Powers	Declare	Subterranean Press	
2001	Connie Willis	Passage	Bantam Books	
2002	Neil Gaiman*	American Gods	William Morrow and Company	
2002	Kelley Eskridge	Solitaire	Eos	
2002	Ursula K. Le Guin	The Other Wind	Harcourt	
2002	Robert A. Metzger	Picoverse	Ace Books	
2002	China Miéville	Perdido Street Station	Del Rey Books	
2002	Michael Swanwick	Bones of the Earth	Eos	
2003	Elizabeth Moon*	The Speed of Dark	Ballantine Books	
2003	Lois McMaster Bujold	Diplomatic Immunity	Baen Books	
2003	Carol Emshwiller	The Mount	Small Beer Press	
2003	Kathleen Ann Goonan	Light Music	Eos	
2003	Nalo Hopkinson	The Salt Roads	Warner	
2003	Jack McDevitt	Chindi	Ace Books	
2004	Lois McMaster Bujold*	Paladin of Souls	Eos	
2004	Cory Doctorow	Down and Out in the Magic Kingdom	Tor Books	
2004	Jack McDevitt	Omega	Ace Books	
2004	David Mitchell	Cloud Atlas	Random House	
2004	Sean Stewart	Perfect Circle	Small Beer Press	
2004	Gene Wolfe	The Knight	Tor Books	
2005	Joe Haldeman*	Camouflage	Analog Science Fiction and Fact	
2005	Susanna Clarke	Jonathan Strange & Mr Norrell	Bloomsbury Publishing	
2005	Jack McDevitt	Polaris	Ace Books	
2005	Terry Pratchett	Going Postal	HarperCollins	
2005	Geoff Ryman	Air	St. Martin's Press	
2005	John C. Wright	Orphans of Chaos	Tor Books	
2006	Jack McDevitt*	Seeker	Ace Books	
2006	Ellen Kushner	The Privilege of the Sword	Bantam Spectra	
2006	Jeffrey Ford	The Girl in the Glass	HarperCollins	
2006	Jo Walton	Farthing	Tor Books	
2006	Richard Bowes	From the Files of the Time Rangers	Golden Gryphon Press	
2006	Wil McCarthy	To Crush the Moon	Bantam Spectra	
2007	Michael Chabon*	The Yiddish Policemen's Union	HarperCollins	
2007	Jack McDevitt	Odyssey	Ace Books	
2007	Joe Haldeman	The Accidental Time Machine	Ace Books	
2007	Nalo Hopkinson	The New Moon's Arms	Warner	
2007	Tobias S. Buckell	Ragamuffin	Tor Books	
2008	Ursula K. Le Guin*	Powers	Harcourt	
2008	Cory Doctorow	Little Brother	Tor Books	
2008	Jack McDevitt	Cauldron	Ace Books	
2008	Ian McDonald	Brasyl	Pyr Books	
2008	Terry Pratchett	Making Money	Harper	
2008	David J. Schwartz	Superpowers	Three Rivers Press	
2009	Paolo Bacigalupi*	The Windup Girl	Night Shade Books	
2009	Christopher Barzak	The Love We Share Without Knowing	Bantam Books	
2009	Laura Anne Gilman	Flesh and Fire	Pocket Books	
2009	China Miéville	The City & the City	Del Rey Books	
2009	Cherie Priest	Boneshaker	Tor Books	
2009	Jeff VanderMeer	Finch	Underland Press	
2010	Connie Willis*	Blackout/All Clear	Bantam Spectra	
2010	M. K. Hobson	The Native Star	Bantam Spectra	
2010	N. K. Jemisin	The Hundred Thousand Kingdoms	Orbit Books	
2010	Mary Robinette Kowal	Shades of Milk and Honey	Tor Books	
2010	Jack McDevitt	Echo	Ace Books	
2010	Nnedi Okorafor	Who Fears Death	DAW Books	
2011	Jo Walton*	Among Others	Tor Books	
2011	China Miéville	Embassytown	Subterranean Press	
2011	Jack McDevitt	Firebird	Ace Books	
2011	Kameron Hurley	God's War	Night Shade Books	
2011	Genevieve Valentine	Mechanique: a Tale of the Circus Tresaulti	Prime Books	
2011	N. K. Jemisin	The Kingdom of Gods	Orbit Books	
2012	Kim Stanley Robinson*	2312	Orbit Books	
2012	Saladin Ahmed	Throne of the Crescent Moon	DAW Books	
2012	Tina Connolly	Ironskin	Tor Books	
2012	N. K. Jemisin	The Killing Moon	Orbit Books	
2012	Caitlín R. Kiernan	The Drowning Girl	Roc Books	
2012	Mary Robinette Kowal	Glamour in Glass	Tor Books	
2013	Ann Leckie*	Ancillary Justice	Orbit Books	
2013	Karen Joy Fowler	We Are All Completely Beside Ourselves	Marian Wood Books	
2013	Neil Gaiman	The Ocean at the End of the Lane	William Morrow and Company	
2013	Charles E. Gannon	Fire with Fire	Baen Books	
2013	Nicola Griffith	Hild	Farrar, Straus and Giroux	
2013	Linda Nagata	The Red: First Light	Mythic Island Press	
2013	Sofia Samatar	A Stranger in Olondria	Small Beer Press	
2013	Helene Wecker	The Golem and the Jinni	Harper	
2014	Jeff VanderMeer*	Annihilation	Farrar, Straus and Giroux	
2014	Katherine Addison	The Goblin Emperor	Tor Books	
2014	Charles E. Gannon	Trial by Fire	Baen Books	
2014	Ann Leckie	Ancillary Sword	Orbit Books	
2014	Cixin Liu	The Three-Body Problem	Tor Books	
2014	Jack McDevitt	Coming Home	Ace Books	
2015	Naomi Novik*	Uprooted	Del Rey Books	
2015	Ann Leckie	Ancillary Mercy	Orbit Books	
2015	Lawrence M. Schoen	Barsk: The Elephants' Graveyard	Tor Books	
2015	N. K. Jemisin	The Fifth Season	Orbit Books	
2015	Ken Liu	The Grace of Kings	Saga Press	
2015	Charles E. Gannon	Raising Caine	Baen Books	
2015	Fran Wilde	Updraft	Tor Books	
2016	Charlie Jane Anders*	All the Birds in the Sky	Tor Books, Titan Books	
2016	Mishell Baker	Borderline	Saga Press	
2016	N. K. Jemisin	The Obelisk Gate	Orbit Books	
2016	Yoon Ha Lee	Ninefox Gambit	Solaris Books	
2016	Nisi Shawl	Everfair	Tor Books	
2017	N. K. Jemisin*	The Stone Sky	Orbit Books	
2017	Lara Elena Donnelly	Amberlough	Tor Books	
2017	Theodora Goss	The Strange Case of the Alchemist's Daughter	Saga Press	
2017	Daryl Gregory	Spoonbenders	Alfred A. Knopf, Riverrun Books	
2017	Mur Lafferty	Six Wakes	Orbit Books	
2017	Fonda Lee	Jade City	Orbit Books	
2017	Annalee Newitz	Autonomous	Tor Books, Orbit Books	
2018	Mary Robinette Kowal*	The Calculating Stars	Tor Books	
2018	Sam J. Miller	Blackfish City	Ecco Press, Orbit UK	
2018	R. F. Kuang	The Poppy War	Harper Voyager	
2018	Naomi Novik	Spinning Silver	Del Rey Books, Macmillan Publishers	
2018	Rebecca Roanhorse	Trail of Lightning	Saga Press	
2018	C. L. Polk	Witchmark	Tor.com Publishing	
2019	Sarah Pinsker*	A Song for a New Day	Berkley Press	
2019	Charles E. Gannon	Marque of Caine	Baen Books	
2019	Alix E. Harrow	The Ten Thousand Doors of January	Orbit Books	
2019	Arkady Martine	A Memory Called Empire	Tor Books	
2019	Silvia Moreno-Garcia	Gods of Jade and Shadow	Del Rey Books, Jo Fletcher Books	
2019	Tamsyn Muir	Gideon the Ninth	Tor.com Publishing	
2020	Martha Wells*	Network Effect	Tor.com Publishing	
2020	Susanna Clarke	Piranesi	Bloomsbury Publishing	
2020	N. K. Jemisin	The City We Became	Orbit Books	
2020	Silvia Moreno-Garcia	Mexican Gothic	Del Rey Books	
2020	C. L. Polk	The Midnight Bargain	Erewhon Books	
2020	Rebecca Roanhorse	Black Sun	Saga Press	
2021	P. Djèlí Clark*	A Master of Djinn	Tor.com Publishing	
2021	C. L. Clark	The Unbroken	Orbit Books	
2021	S. B. Divya	Machinehood	Saga Press	
2021	Arkady Martine	A Desolation Called Peace	Tor.com Publishing	
2021	Jason Sanford	Plague Birds	Apex	
2022	R. F. Kuang*	Babel: Or the Necessity of Violence: An Arcane History of the Oxford Translators' Revolution	Harper Voyager	
2022	Travis Baldree	Legends & Lattes	Cryptid Press, Tor Books	
2022	Nicola Griffith	Spear	Tordotcom	
2022	T. Kingfisher	Nettle & Bone	Tor Books, Titan Books	
2022	Tamsyn Muir	Nona the Ninth	Tordotcom	
2022	Ray Nayler	The Mountain in the Sea	MCD, Weidenfeld & Nicolson	
2023	Vajra Chandrasekera*	The Saint of Bright Doors	Tordotcom	
2023	S. L. Huang	The Water Outlaws	Tordotcom, Solaris UK	
2023	Ann Leckie	Translation State	Orbit US, Orbit UK	
2023	Annalee Newitz	The Terraformers	Tordotcom, Orbit UK	
2023	Wole Talabi	Shigidi and the Brass Head of Obalufon	DAW Books, Gollancz	
2023	Martha Wells	Witch King	Tordotcom	
2024	John Wiswell*	Someone You Can Build a Nest In	DAW Books, Arcadia	
2024	Kerstin Hall	Asunder	Tordotcom	
2024	Kelly Link	The Book of Love	Random House, Ad Astra Press	
2024	Vajra Chandrasekera	Rakesfall	Tordotcom	
2024	Yaroslav Barsukov	Sleeping Worlds Have No Memory	Caezik SF & Fantasy	
2024	T. Kingfisher	A Sorceress Comes to Call	Tor Books, Titan Books	
2025	Stephen Graham Jones*	The Buffalo Hunter Hunter	Saga Press, Titan UK	
2025	Daryl Gregory	When We Were Real	Saga Press	
2025	R. F. Kuang	Katabasis	Harper Voyager	
2025	Nnedi Okorafor	Death of the Author	William Morrow and Company, Victor Gollancz	
2025	Emily Tesh	The Incandescent	Tor Books, Orbit UK	
2025	Natalia Theodoridou	Sour Cherry	Tin House, Wildfire	
2025	John Wiswell	Wearing the Lion	DAW Books, Arcadia Books	

== See also ==
- Hugo Award for Best Novel
- List of joint winners of the Hugo and Nebula awards
- Locus Award for Best Novel
