= Xenoarchaeology =

Hypothetical form of archaeology of remnants of alien civilizations

Xenoarchaeology, a branch of xenology dealing with extraterrestrial cultures, is a hypothetical form of archaeology that exists mainly in works of science fiction. The field is concerned with the study of the material remains to reconstruct and interpret past life-ways of alien civilizations. Xenoarchaeology is not currently practiced by mainstream archaeologists due to the current lack of any material for the discipline to study.

== Etymology ==
The name derives from Greek xenos (ξένος) which means 'stranger, alien', and archaeology 'study of ancients'.

Xenoarchaeology is sometimes called astroarchaeology or exoarchaeology, although some would argue that the prefix exo- would be more correctly applied to the study of human activities in a space environment.

Other names for xenoarchaeology, or specialised fields of interest, include Probe SETI (Search for Extra-Terrestrial Intelligence), extraterrestrial archaeology, space archaeology, SETA (Search for Extra-Terrestrial Artifacts), Dysonian SETI, Planetary SETI, SETT (Search for Extra-Terrestrial Technology), SETV (Search for Extra-Terrestrial Visitation), extraterrestrial anthropology, areoarchaeology and selenoarchaeology.

== Justification ==
It is arguably the case that, due to the immense distances between stars, any evidence that can be discovered of extraterrestrial intelligence, whether it be an artifact or an electromagnetic signal, may come from a long-vanished civilization. Thus the entire SETI project can be seen as a form of archaeology. Additionally, due to the extreme age of the universe, there may be a reasonable expectation for astrobiology research to produce evidence of extinct alien life prior to the discovery of alien life itself.

The study of alien cultures might offer the human species glimpses into its own past or future development.

Vicky Walsh argued for the existence of "exo-artifacts" using the principle of mediocrity and the Drake equation. She proposed that a theoretical and speculative field of archaeology be established in order to test outlandish claims and to prepare for a time when undeniably extraterrestrial artifacts needed to be analysed. "If it is possible to construct an abstract archaeology that can be tested and refined on earth and then applied to areas beyond our planet, then the claims for ETI remains on the moon and Mars may really be evaluated in light of established archaeological theory and analysis".

Ben McGee similarly proposed the creation of a set of interdisciplinary, proactive xenoarchaeological guidelines, arguing that identifying suspected artifacts of astrobiology is all that is required to justify establishing a methodology for xenoarchaeology. He emphasized the necessity of proactive xenoarchaeological work in order to avoid future bias, mischaracterization, and information mismanagement, and he cites three scenarios under which such a methodology or set of guidelines would be useful, those being "remote sensing" of a potential xenoarchaeological artifact, encountering an artifact during "human exploration," and "terrestrial interception" of an artifact.

== History ==
The origins of the field have been traced to theories about a hypothetical Martian civilization based on observations of what were perceived as canals on Mars. These theories, of which Percival Lowell was the most famous exponent, were apparently inspired by a mistranslation of a quote by Giovanni Schiaparelli.

The 1997 Theoretical Archaeology Group conference featured a session on "archaeology and science fiction".

The 2004 annual meeting of the American Anthropological Association featured a session Anthropology, Archaeology and Interstellar Communication.

== Planetary SETI ==
Planetary SETI is concerned with the search for extraterrestrial structures on the surface of bodies in the Solar System. Claims for evidence of extraterrestrial artifacts can be divided into three groups, the Moon, Mars, and the other planets and their satellites.

Examples of sites of interest include the "bridge" sighted in the Mare Crisium in 1953, and the "Blair Cuspids", "an unusual arrangement of seven spirelike objects of varying heights" at the western edge of the Mare Tranquillitatis, photographed by the Lunar Orbiter 2 on 20 November 1966. In 2006, Ian Crawford proposed that a search for alien artifacts be conducted on the Moon.

Percival Lowell's mistaken identification of Martian canals was an early attempt to detect and study an alien culture from its supposed physical remains. More recently, there was interest in the supposed Face on Mars, an example of the psychological phenomenon of pareidolia.

The Society for Planetary SETI Research is a loose organization of researchers interested in this field. The organization does not endorse any particular conclusions drawn by its members on particular sites.

== Probe SETI, or SETA ==
A great deal of research and writing has been done, and some searches conducted for extraterrestrial probes in the Solar System. This followed the work of Ronald N. Bracewell.

Robert Freitas, Christopher Rose and Gregory Wright have argued that interstellar probes can be a more energy-efficient means of communication than electromagnetic broadcasts.

If so, a solar centric Search for Extraterrestrial Artifacts (SETA) would seem to be favored over the more traditional radio or optical searches. Robert A. Freitas coined the term SETA in the 1980s.

On the basis that the Earth-Moon or Sun-Earth libration orbits might constitute convenient parking places for automated extraterrestrial probes, unsuccessful searches were conducted by Freitas and Valdes.

== Dysonian SETI ==
In a 1960 paper, Freeman Dyson proposed the idea of a Dyson sphere, a type of extraterrestrial artifact able to be searched for and studied at interstellar distances. Following that paper, several searches have been conducted.

In a 2005 paper, Luc Arnold proposed a means of detecting smaller, though still mega-scale, artifacts from their distinctive transit light curve signature. (see Astroengineering).

== Fringe theories ==
A subculture of enthusiasts studies purported structures on the Moon or Mars. These controversial "structures" (such as the Face on Mars) are not accepted as more than natural features by most scientists, examples of the pareidolia phenomenon.

Palaeocontact or ancient astronaut theories, espoused by Erich von Däniken and others, are further examples of fringe theories. These claim that the Earth was visited in prehistoric times by extraterrestrial beings.

== Science fiction ==
Xenoarchaeological themes are common in science fiction. Works about the exploration of enigmatic extraterrestrial artifacts have been satirically categorized as Big Dumb Object stories.

Some of the more prominent examples of xenoarchaeological fiction include Arthur C. Clarke's novel Rendezvous with Rama, H. Beam Piper's short story Omnilingual, and Charles Sheffield's Heritage Universe series.

=== Novels ===
- 2001: A Space Odyssey by Arthur C. Clarke
- Broken Angels by Richard Morgan
- Gateway by Fred Pohl
- Grass by Sheri S. Tepper
- Heritage Trilogy by Ian Douglas
- Noon Universe by Strugatsky brothers.
- Rendezvous With Rama by Arthur C. Clarke
- Revelation Space by Alastair Reynolds
- Ringworld (and its sequels) by Larry Niven
- Saga of Seven Suns (Most notably Book 1: Hidden Empire) by Kevin J. Anderson
- Strata by Terry Pratchett
- The Engines of God by Jack McDevitt
- The Expanse by James S. A. Corey
- The Gaea Trilogy by John Varley
- The Giants series by James P. Hogan
- The Hercules Text by Jack McDevitt
- The novels in the Heritage Universe by Charles Sheffield
- The Past of Forever (Children of the Stars, Book 4) by Juanita Coulson
- The Season of Passage by Christopher Pike
- The Voyage of the Space Beagle by A. E. van Vogt

=== Short stories ===
- "At the Mountains of Madness" by H. P. Lovecraft
- "Old Testament" by Jerome Bixby
- "Omnilingual" by H. Beam Piper
- "The Sentinel" by Arthur C. Clarke
- "The Vaults of Yoh-Vombis" by Clark Ashton Smith
- "The Adventure of Tintin: Flight 714 to Sydney" by Herge

=== Video games ===
- Alien Legacy
- Aliens vs. Predator
- Ascendancy
- Astroneer
- Battlefleet Gothic: Armada 2
- Borderlands
- Civilization: Call to Power
- Dead Space
- Doom 3
- Freelancer
- FreeSpace
- Gateway
- Halo series
- Marathon 2: Durandal
- Mass Effect
- Master of Orion
- Metal Fatigue
- Outer Wilds
- RAMA (based on Clarke's novel)
- Resistance
- Sid Meier's Alpha Centauri
- Star Trek: A Final Unity
- Star Wars Jedi: Fallen Order
- Star Wars: Knights of the Old Republic
- StarCraft series
- Stellaris
- The Dig
- The Lacuna Expanse
- Wing Commander: Privateer

=== Movies ===
- A Genesis Found
- Alien
- Alien vs. Predator
- Alien: Covenant
- Black Mountain Side
- Chariots of the Gods
- Contact
- DC Extended Universe
- Doom
- Eternals
- Forbidden Planet
- Indiana Jones and the Kingdom of the Crystal Skull
- Indiana Jones and the Last Crusade
- Indiana Jones and the Raiders of the Lost Ark
- Indiana Jones and the Temple of Doom
- Marvel Cinematic Universe
- Outlander
- Prometheus
- Sphere
- Star Wars
- Stargate
- The Box
- The Fifth Element
- The Last Lovecraft: Relic of Cthulhu
- Total Recall
- Uncharted

=== Television ===
- Ancient Aliens
- Babylon 5
- Doctor Who
- Martian Chronicles
- Star Trek
- Stargate
- Stargate SG-1 and its spinoff Stargate Atlantis

== See also ==
- Ancient astronauts
- Pseudoarchaeology
- Silurian hypothesis
- Xenolinguistics
