= A Talent for War =

1989 novel by Jack McDevitt

- First edition (1989 p/b)
- Author: Jack McDevitt
- Cover artist: Darrell K. Sweet (pictured)
- Language: English
- Series: Alex Benedict
- Genre: Science fiction, mystery
- Publisher: Ace Books
- Publication date: February 1989
- Publication place: United States
- Media type: Print (Paperback & Hardback)
- Pages: 310 pp (first edition, paperback)
- ISBN: 0-441-79553-6 (first edition, paperback)
- OCLC: 19413305
- Followed by: Polaris

A Talent for War is a science fiction mystery novel by American writer Jack McDevitt, the story of a search by Alex Benedict, the protagonist, to discover the nature of a mysterious project Alex's uncle had been working on when the interstellar passenger ship, on which his uncle was a passenger, was lost in space. This investigation leads deep into the history of a war between human civilization and a neighboring alien civilization and challenges the foundation mythos of the current human government.

The book is the first in the Alex Benedict series. It is the only one told from Benedict’s point of view; the others are narrated by his pilot and assistant, Chase Kolpath.

== Synopsis ==
=== Setting and background ===
The story is set approximately 9,600 years in the future (approximately 11,600 C.E.). As is made clearer in McDevitt's later Alex Benedict novel Seeker, during the course of recorded history, human civilization has spread through a substantial part of the Orion Arm of our galaxy. The novel is concerned with two time periods – the present of the principal viewpoint character, Alex Benedict, and a period approximately 200 years before his time, which is viewed through back-story.

Humanity discovered the ruins of one alien technological civilization, and encountered one that at the time of the story is alive and thriving, the Ashiyyur. The sphere of Ashiyyur worlds is described by the author as abutting the worlds of human civilization along the Perimeter – first contact was made at least several hundred years before the time in which the back-story is set. McDevitt conceives the Ashiyyur as being at approximately the same technological level as humans, and in fact humanoid – bi-laterally symmetrical, bipedal, larger than average for human, of two genders, descended from predators, and interested in the same kind of real estate as humans. Most significantly for the story, they are also incapable of audible speech without mechanical aids, and are nicknamed “Mutes” by humans as a result. The Ashiyyur are telepathic and have evolved a society based on that form of communication. They have the ability, with some difficulty, to “read” human minds and emotions. Ashiyyur civilization is described as being much older than human civilization (approximately 75,000 years versus perhaps 15,000) but as having developed much more slowly. It is important to the back-story that to the Ashiyyur, human dynamism and exuberance appear threatening and humans are aggressive, untrustworthy, and unethical.

McDevitt describes human civilization at the time of the back-story as spread across many worlds, most of which were independent of the others. All maintained sentimental ties with Earth, but difficulties of interstellar travel and local parochialism ensured that there was no central government. Many human worlds maintained their own armed forces but again there was no central direction. Communication between worlds was limited to travel by interstellar ships, which used magnetic drives for short and medium distance travel within star systems and Armstrong interstellar drives by means of which ships could travel between star systems through “Armstrong space”. Both at the time of the back-story and in the protagonist's time, navigation using Armstrong drives is sufficiently imprecise that ships must for safety reasons emerge from Armstrong space well away from stars and planets and travel substantial distances (and times) using magnetic drives. In addition, and partly as a result, travel through Armstrong space is time-consuming – as described in the novel, a voyage of 3,000 light years takes about seven months, of which about five months time is spent in Armstrong space. It is important to the story that some individuals, like Alex Benedict and most Ashiyyur, react physically badly to the transitions into and out of Armstrong space.

As described in the back-story, following first contact with the Ashiyyur, there was increasing friction between human and Ashiyyur civilizations, evolving from a “cold war” into an increasing number of small and then larger military clashes in which the Ashiyyur generally prevailed. The fiercely independent governments of the human worlds responded to the Ashiyyurian challenge largely by dithering and self-deception about the threat. A few human worlds, led by Dellaconda, reacted militarily by forming a small military force, based at first mainly on the Dellacondan navy, to wage a guerrilla war known as "the Resistance" against the Ashiyyur. The back-story begins at this point in history, although it is not told in strictly chronological sequence.

=== Plot ===
Alex Benedict receives word from a cousin that his uncle Gabriel was among the passengers on an interstellar that disappeared in Armstrong space. A package arrives from his uncle’s lawyers informing Alex that he is his uncle’s heir and giving Alex a sealed message from his uncle. Alex learns that his uncle had been working on a special archeological project that Alex is to pursue now that his uncle cannot. Alex must return to his uncle's home on Rimway and look in the “Leisha Tanner” file to recover relevant research and notes. The message does not discuss the nature of the project, other than to mention Hugh Scott, an old acquaintance. However, en route to Rimway, Alex learns that his uncle’s house has been burgled and, when he arrives, that the Tanner file is missing and all of his uncle's computerized records have been destroyed.

From this point onward, the story follows two increasingly intertwined threads, a mystery in the present and a history narrated in the backstory. The mystery is the nature of Uncle Gabe’s project, which Alex works to discover. As Alex does so, he becomes increasingly immersed in the history of the Resistance and its principal leader and hero, Christopher Sim. The story switches back and forth between the developing mystery and the historical narrative.

Alex visits the local police inspector and learns that the burglars apparently wanted only the Tanner file. The inspector, a social friend of Alex's uncle, can shed little light on Gabe’s project other than to note that Alex's uncle seemed distracted for the three months before his death and that he had become a “nut” on the subject of Christopher Sim and the Resistance.

Chase Kolpath visits Alex at his uncle's house. Before disappearing, Gabriel Benedict had hired Ms. Kolpath to investigate the last flight of the Tenandrome, Hugh Scott's Planetary Survey ship, and then meet Gabe at a world near the Veiled Lady star cluster and pilot them to an unspecified destination. Alex's uncle disappeared before reaching his destination, and owed Ms. Kolpath a considerable sum. Alex agrees to pay what his uncle owed her and asks her to assist him in his investigations. From the planned logistics of the trip, Ms. Kolpath estimates that they were to travel from 800 to 1,500 light years distance. Chase doesn’t know Gabe’s objective, only that it had something to do with the Tenandrome. That ship had explored the Veiled Lady about three years before Gabe’s death and returned unexpectedly early. “Apparently, they saw something. . . Gabe wanted to know what, but I could never find out.”

Alex researches the Tenandrome flight but finds no indication of anything unusual besides a mechanical breakdown. He then attempts to visit Hugh Scott, but finds that Scott has been away from home for months. One of his neighbors notes that Scott’s personality has changed since the Tenandrome flight. Like Alex's uncle, Scott has become obsessed by the Resistance and Christopher Sim.

Alex gradually learns more of the history of the Resistance and is puzzled by the fact that during the war Sim’s forces, and especially Sim himself, appear to have been present and in action at widely separated locations virtually simultaneously. He contacts the local Ashiyyur representative office to review Ashiyyur records of the war, which might shed some light on the problem. Alex meets S’Kalian and experiences mind-to-mind contact for the first time. He learns that the Ashiyyur are aware of the “problem” of Sim’s nearly simultaneous appearances in distant places and account for it as human scholars have done, by assuming that Sim’s fleet included as many as three other Dellacondan vessels disguised as the Corsarius, Sim's ship, as a form of psychological warfare.

Dellaconda itself is the next destination, as Chase and Alex continue their hunt for Hugh Scott. Alex visits Christopher Sim’s home and the school where he taught before the war; both are maintained as shrines to his memory. He locates and meets with Hugh Scott, in spite of Scott’s obvious reluctance. Scott will not say anything about theTenandrome mission, except to confirm that the survey ship found something and that there was a good reason to keep it secret. Alex startles Scott by guessing that the Tenadrome had found a Dellacondan warship, but Scott will say no more.

The mystery begins to unravel. Alex and Chase decide that whatever the Tenandrome found, Lesha Tanner had found it first, 200 years before. Alex has an inspiration – the location of the missing something is obliquely described in a poem by Walford Candles, to whom Tanner must have confided the secret. A collection of Candles' poems, Rumors of Earth, had been in Uncle Gabe’s bedroom when Alex returned, and was open to that poem. Gabriel Benedict must have had the same insight. Alex is able to find the university researcher who helped his uncle work with the clues in Candles’ poem and who identifies a location about 1,300 light years into the Veiled Lady as the primary locus of search.

Alex and Chase rent a ship and begin a two-month journey through Armstrong space. At their destination, they find a red dwarf star with two planets in its habitable zone. One appears to be a terrestrial world and they move toward it. From a distance, they are able to see something artificial orbiting this world. Moving closer, they can see first that it is a ship, then that it is a warship, and then that it is a Dellacondan warship. Finally, they can make out clearly the ship’s insignia – the famous markings of Corsarius, Christoper Sim’s own.

They board the ship and find that the Corsarius has power and appears functional. Indeed, the ship appears virtually normal, aside from a few mechanical malfunctions due to age. They play back the captain’s log, and unexpectedly find that it ends before the battle at Rigel at which Sim died. They listen to the whole record and hear a Sim’s-eye view of the history of the Resistance. It becomes clear that as time had passed, Sim became increasingly angry at the shortsightedness of the major human worlds and increasingly disturbed by the casualties among “our finest and bravest.” Toward the end, “his anger flared: there will be a Confederacy one day, . . . but they will not construct it on the bodies of my men.”

Gradually, Alex works out the answer. Christopher Sim became disillusioned with the war and wanted to sue for peace. His brother Tarien and other Resistance leaders seized him and marooned him on this planet to keep him from surrendering. Alex confirms this by searching the planet in a lander and finding Sim’s camp. There is no indication there what happened to Sim.

Chase reports from orbit that an Ashiyyur warship is inbound at high speed. Then another appears, slowing to make orbit around Sim's world of exile. Alex warns Chase to abandon their rented ship for the Corsarius; she does so just before the first Ashiyyur warship destroys their rented ship. Alex joins her and learns that the Armstrong drive on the Corsarius won’t be fully charged for about a day. Their problem is to stay alive until the Armstrong drive is ready. They borrow a classic maneuver from one of Sim’s battles and leave orbit at high speed headed directly toward the incoming Ashiyyur warship, which cannot slow its speed quickly enough to meet them. It uses lasers to disable Corsarius' magnetic drives; Chase realizes too late that she has forgotten to raise the ship’s shields. The Ashiyyur warship reverses its trajectory and reaches them about ten hours before they can jump. It demands their surrender. Through a strategem, Alex and Chase are able to fire Corsarius’ major weapons at it, damaging it badly and forcing it to flee. Ten hours later, the interstellar drive activates. It is not an Armstrong drive but something else, product of Rashim Machesney’s genius. In an eye blink, Corsarius is in orbit around Rimway, and safe.

The huge (if temporary) technological advantage conferred on humanity by the new drive ends the human-Ashiyyur rivalry; the Perimeter stabilizes and more peaceful relations develop between the two civilizations.

In an epilogue to the novel, the reader learns, with Hugh Scott, that Christopher Sim did not die on the planet where he was marooned. Sim was rescued by Leisha Tanner and lived afterward under the assumed identity of Jerome Courtney, spending considerable time as a respected lay brother at a Catholic monastery on an isolated planet. There, he continued to write on various historical and philosophical subjects.

== Principal characters ==
=== The Present ===
The following are the principal characters from the story set in the "present" of the novel:

Alex Benedict - A reputable and very successful dealer in human antiquities. His interest in the field was sparked by his uncle, Gabriel Benedict, who raised him from an early age.

Gabriel Benedict - An older man of independent means, an amateur archeologist, well-regarded and greatly experienced in the field. He lived on Rimway, in the country west of Andiquar, the planetary capital and capital of the Confederacy.

Chase Kolpath - When the story opens, Ms. Kolpath is an experienced private interstellar pilot who had been working with Gabriel Benedict intermittently for several years.

S’Kalian - Representative of the Ashiyyur on Rimway.

Hugh Scott - Formerly an acquaintance of Gabriel Benedict, later a member of the Planetary Survey and a crew member on the Tenandrome on its flight to explore the Veiled Lady star cluster.

=== The Past ===
The following are all historical characters who play significant roles in the back-story.

Christopher Sim - Christopher Sim is the most important character in the "historical" back-story, the person around whom the central mystery of the novel revolves. As Alex Benedict's quest progresses, the author reveals more and more of Sim's story. Sim lived about 200 years before the novel's "present" time, beginning as a teacher of Ancient History and Government on the planet Dellaconda, a frontier world near the Perimeter (border) with Ashiyyur space. McDevitt portrays the reaction of Sim, his politician brother Tarien Sim and others on Dellaconda and neighboring frontier worlds to the Ashiyyur threat: they banded together, formed a small naval force and conducted a guerrilla war (the "Resistance") over a four or five year period against the Ashiyyur. The author tells (one of his major themes) how the Resistance faced apathy or outright hostility from most other humans - for every human world that supported the Resistance, McDevitt tells us, two remained neutral (including the most powerful) and a few accepted overlordship of the Ashiyyur.

McDevitt portrays Christopher Sim as an unlikely hero who rose to greatness through an unexpected "talent for war," a charismatic military genius able to anticipate his enemy’s plans and outwit them with his own. As McDevitt describes the history of the war, over several years, Sim's forces won a series of improbable military victories against far superior Ashiyyur forces through a combination of audacity, imaginative tactics, excellent strategic intelligence, and uncanny insights into Ashiyyur psychology. Sim’s forces, small though they were (“sixty-odd frigates and destroyers holding off the massive fleets of the Ashiyyur”), seemed to be everywhere at once. McDevitt tells us that Sim's strategic successes foreshadowed his ultimate tactical defeat. While the tide of public opinion (if not government policies) on human worlds slowly turned in favor of the Resistance, Sim’s forces’ unavoidable losses in battle and meager replenishment and the much larger military forces on the other side eventually brought Sim to bay. In a climactic battle near Rigel, Sim’s remaining forces were overwhelmed and his famous ship, the frigate Corsarius, was destroyed. Only a handful of Dellacondan ships survived the battle; the Resistance navy ceased to exist for all practical purposes.

Christopher Sim’s death in battle, like that of Leonidas at Thermopylae, changed everything, according to the author. Public opinion swung swiftly to demand war against the Ashiyyur. Previously hesitant governments on many worlds now committed to the war effort; one especially resistant government was overthrown by an enraged populace and its major military forces committed to the war. Within a few months, Tarien Sim and his colleagues were able to persuade the majority of human worlds to sign the Instrument of Confederation creating a human federal government. The military forces of "half a hundred human worlds" were contributed to a unified Confederate fleet, which battled the Ashiyyur forces to a standstill and preserved the independence of human civilization. Tarien Sim did not live to see this outcome; he was killed in battle shortly before the Instrument was signed and before the weight of human forces could be effectively mobilized.

Leisha Tanner: Another key figure, through whose perceptions (reflected in her private papers and the journals of her friend Walford Candles) McDevitt tells the major part of the back-story. She was a university professor at and after the time of the Resistance, a specialist in Ashiyyur philosophy and literature. Her translations of and writings on the most important Ashiyyur philosopher, Tulisofala, are still considered definitive in Alec Benedict’s time. She was a peace activist during the early years of the Resistance, later becoming a staff intelligence officer and diplomat for the Dellacondans.

Rashim Machesney: The most eminent physicist at the time of the Resistance, an expert in gravitational wave theory. Portrayed by the author as a larger-than-life Falstaffian figure, Machesney declared support for the Resistance early in the war and joined them with much of his scientific team. The Ashiyyur denounced him as a war criminal for creating advanced weaponry for Sim’s military forces. His principal apparent value to the Resistance was diplomatic. Together with Tarien Sim, Machesney was the public face of the Resistance. His scientific prestige lent credibility to the cause, his political campaigns drew public attention, his brilliant writings persuaded.

Walford Candles: A professor of classical literature, a war poet, a contemporary of Christopher Sim and a friend of Leisha Tanner. In the novel, his journals are the best source of information about and insight into Leisha Tanner. They also paint a vivid picture of life on the home front during the time of the Resistance, with non-combatants waiting in hope and despair as the fortunes of the Dellacondans rise and, eventually, fall.

== Critical reception ==
The SF Site's Steven H Silver wrote, "While A Talent for War is not McDevitt's best novel, it shows signs of the writer he is still becoming. Even where the characters flag, the ideas remain at the forefront and manage to place A Talent for War above a standard space opera or science fictional mystery." Reviewer Russ Allbery praised the novel's "unique perspective" on the theme of first contact with aliens, its "quaint feel that's both comfortable and oddly prosaic," and its "satisfying, tense conclusion":

This isn't a book to grab and hold the reader; the prose is unadorned, Alex is a straightforward and logical (if self-centered) first-person narrator, and the characterization of most of the cast frankly leaves something to be desired. But in its puzzling out of history, it evokes the sort of fascination TV shows like History's Mysteries strive for. The portrayal of archeological and historical work feels right. There are dead ends, witnesses with suspect motives, lies and exaggerations, papers and memoirs that are frustratingly elliptical or written by people only ancillary to the investigation, and even a wonderfully-portrayed crackpot historical society.

Science fiction scholar John Clute, comparing McDevitt's second novel with his first, The Hercules Text, wrote, "A Talent for War (1988 [sic]), set in a galactic venue eons hence, similarly sets a religious frame around the central quest plot, in which a young man must thread his way through the unsettled hinterlands dividing human and alien space in his search for the secret that may retroactively destroy the reputation of a human who has been a hero in the recent wars. In both novels, [McDevitt] wrestles valiantly with the task he has set himself: that of imposing an essentially contemplative structure upon conventions designed for violent action. He comes, at times, close to success."

A Talent for War is not one of the three novels annotated under Jack McDevitt's name in the current (fifth) edition of Anatomy of Wonder.

== Publication history ==
Portions of Chapters 9 and 22–24 were published as a novelette in the February 1987 issue of Isaac Asimov’s Science Fiction Magazine under the title "Dutchman”.

Portions of Chapter 15 were published in a different form as a novelette in the March 1988 issue of Isaac Asimov’s Science Fiction Magazine under the title “Sunrise”.

Ace Books originally published A Talent for War as a mass market paperback in February 1989. Ace Books republished the book as a mass market paperback in July 2004. It was also published in a hardcover book club edition in June 1989 for the Science Fiction Book Club.

In Great Britain, Kinnell published a hardcover edition and Sphere published a paperback edition in June 1989. In September 2000, Meisha Merlin published, in hardcover and trade paperback formats, an omnibus edition with The Hercules Text, an earlier McDevitt novel, under the title Hello Out There.

== Release details ==
- 1989, USA, Ace Books (ISBN 0-441-79553-6) Pub date February 1989, paperback (First edition)
- 1989, UK, Kinnell Publications (ISBN 1-870532-09-0), Pub date June 1989, hardback
- 1989, UK, Sphere Books (ISBN 0-7474-0333-3), Pub date 26 October 1989, paperback
- 1989, USA, Ace Books (ISBN unknown), June 1989, hardback (Science Fiction Book Club edition, # 14900)
- 1989, USA, G. P. Putnam's (ISBN 0425795535), Pub date 31 December 1998, paperback
- 2004, USA, Ace Books (ISBN 0441012175), Pub date 29 June 2004, paperback
- 2000, UK, Meisha Merlin Publishing (ISBN 1-892065-23-1), Pub date 25 Aug 2000, paperback (omnibus edition with Hercules Text and called Hello Out There )
- 2000, UK, Meisha Merlin Publishing (ISBN 1-892065-22-3), Pub date September 2000, hardback (omnibus edition with Hercules Text and called Hello Out There )

== Book design ==
- 1989 U. S. Paperback: Cover art: Darrell K. Sweet.
- 1989 SFBC Hardback: Jacket art: Ron Walotsky; Jacket design: Rosemary Kracke
- 1989 G. B. Paperback: Cover art: Gerry Grace
- 1989 G. B. Paperback: Cover art: Danny Flynn
- 2004 U. S. Paperback: Cover art: Darrell K. Sweet; Cover design: Rita Frangie

== General and cited sources ==
- Barron, Neil (2004). Ascent of Wonder: The Evolution of Hard SF. Saint Martin's Press. ISBN 0312855095.
- Clute, John; Nichols, Peter (1993). The Encyclopedia of Science Fiction (2nd ed.). New York: Saint Martin's Press. ISBN 0312096186.
