= Polaris (novel) =

2004 novel by Jack McDevitt

- First edition
- Author: Jack McDevitt
- Cover artist: John Harris
- Language: English
- Series: Alex Benedict
- Genre: Science fiction, mystery
- Publisher: Ace Books
- Publication date: November 2004
- Media type: Printed (Paperback & Hardback)
- Pages: 370 (first edition, hardcover)
- ISBN: 0-441-01202-7 (first edition, hardcover)
- OCLC: 56517891
- Dewey Decimal: 813/.54 22
- LC Class: PS3563.C3556 P65 2004
- Preceded by: A Talent for War
- Followed by: Seeker

Polaris is a science fiction mystery novel by American writer Jack McDevitt. It is the second book of his Alex Benedict series. Antiquities dealer Alex Benedict and his employee, Chase Kolpath, become involved in a mystery involving the disappearance of the passengers and crew of an interstellar yacht from 60 years earlier.

It was nominated for the Nebula Award for Best Novel.
