= Ancient Shores =

1996 novel by Jack McDevitt

- First edition cover
- Author: Jack McDevitt
- Cover artist: Jim Burns
- Language: English
- Genre: Science fiction
- Publisher: HarperPrism
- Publication date: April 1996
- Publication place: United States
- Media type: Print (hardback & paperback)
- Pages: 397 (first edition, hardback)
- ISBN: 0-06-105207-8 (first edition, hardback)
- OCLC: 33948882
- Dewey Decimal: 813/.54 20
- LC Class: PS3563.C3556 A8 1996
- Followed by: Thunderbird (2015)

Ancient Shores is a science fiction novel by American writer Jack McDevitt, published in 1996. It was nominated for the Nebula Award for Best Novel in 1997. A continuation of this novel by the same writer was published in 2015, entitled Thunderbird.

== Plot summary ==
A vast lake, known as Lake Agassiz, covered much of North Dakota, Manitoba and Minnesota during prehistoric times.

The story begins when farmer Tom Lasker and his son, Will, uncover a seemingly brand new yacht. Found on a landlocked farm, it draws tourists to the area. Max Collingswood, a friend of Tom's, tries to help discover the origins of the boat. Collingswood enlists April Cannon, a worker at a chemical lab who discovers that the yacht is made of an unknown material. In fact, it is a fiberglass-like material with an impossible atomic number (161).

Collingswood and Cannon discover something else on a nearby ridge which is part of a Sioux reservation. The Sioux assist in its excavation and examination. It turns out to be a green glassy roundhouse-like structure, made from the same material.

Eventually, they gain access to it, revealing a dock for the sailboat, but no entrance for it. The discovery that the structure contains the means to access other sites not on Earth sets off a struggle between the Government and the Reservation for control of it.

== Characters ==
- Tom Lasker – farmer
- Max Collingswood – Tom's friend
- April Cannon – chemist
- Arky Redfern - Sioux tribal member and lawyer for the tribe
- James Walker - Chairman of the Sioux tribe
- Elizabeth Silvera – government worker
