= Standard Candles =

1996 compilation of short stories by Jack McDevitt

Standard Candles is a compilation of science fiction short stories by American author Jack McDevitt, published in 1996.

First edition (publ. Tachyon Publications) Cover artist: Michael Dashow

The sixteen stories in the anthology were originally published in various magazines from 1982 to 1996. The introduction is provided by Charles Sheffield.

Like many of the author's works, the title story is set at an astronomical observatory and refers to a star's absolute brightness, connecting that phenomenon with the relationship between two individuals in the story. No matter where one stands, the light radiates at the same level of intensity. ("Standard Candles", "Ellie", and "Cryptic")

Other stories in the collection deal with chess ("Black to Move" and "The Jersey Rifle"), time travel with unintended consequences ("Cruising Through Deuteronomy" and "Time Travelers Never Die"), and the beginnings of interplanetary exploration ("Translations from the Colosian", "Promises to Keep", and "To Hell with the Stars", the last an exposition of what may happen if humanity chooses to not enter space).

== Contents ==
- "Standard Candles"
- "Tidal Effects"
- "Translations from the Colosian"
- "Black to Move"
- "The Fort Moxie Branch"
- "Promises to Keep"
- "Gus"
- "To Hell with the Stars"
- "Ellie"
- "The Jersey Rifle"
- "Cruising Through Deuteronomy"
- "Tyger"
- "Auld Lang Boom"
- "Dutchman"
- "Cryptic"
- "Time Travelers Never Die"
