= Infinity Beach =

2000 novel by Jack McDevitt

- First edition (publ. HarperPrism); Cover art by Craig Attebery
- Author: Jack McDevitt
- Language: English
- Publication date: 2000

Infinity Beach is a 2000 science fiction novel by Jack McDevitt. It is a story of a first contact between human and alien civilizations.

It was a 2000 nominee for the Nebula Award for Best Novel.
