= The Native Star =

2010 novel by M. K. Hobson

- Author: M. K. Hobson
- Cover artist: David Stevenson
- Language: English
- Genre: Historical Fantasy
- Publisher: Bantam Spectra
- Publication date: October 2010
- Publication place: United States
- Media type: Print (Paperback)
- ISBN: 978-0-553-59265-8
- Followed by: The Hidden Goddess

The Native Star is a historical fantasy novel, and the first novel from writer M. K. Hobson. It was nominated for the 2010 Nebula Award.

== Plot summary ==
The Native Star, set in America in 1876, follows the adventures of Emily Edwards, town witch of the tiny Sierra Nevada settlement of Lost Pine. Her business is suffering from the rise of mail-order patent magicks, and her only chance at avoiding the penury at her doorstep is to use a love spell to bewitch the town's richest lumberman into marrying her.

When the love spell goes terribly wrong, Emily is forced to accept the aid of Dreadnought Stanton—a pompous and scholarly Warlock from New York City—to set things right. Together, they travel from the seedy underbelly of San Francisco's Barbary Coast, across the United States by transcontinental railroad and biomechanical flying machine, to the highest halls of American magical power, all while being pursued by various factions who want for themselves a powerful magical artifact that has come into Emily's possession.

== Critical reception ==
The Native Star was included on Locus' Recommended Reading List for 2010 as well as several other "Top 10 of 2010" lists. Publishers Weekly called it "clever and original" and "[a] splendid debut." It was nominated for the 2011 Nebula Award for Best Novel.

== Reviews ==
- Review by A.M. Dellamonica on Tor.com
