= Eternity Road (novel) =

1998 novel by Jack McDevitt

- First edition cover
- Author: Jack McDevitt
- Cover artist: Joe Dansis
- Language: English
- Genre: Science fiction novel
- Publisher: Eos Books
- Publication date: May 1, 1997; 29 years ago
- Publication place: United States
- Media type: Print (hardback & paperback)
- Pages: 416 pp (paperback)
- ISBN: 0-06-105427-5

Eternity Road, published in 1998, is a science fiction novel written by Jack McDevitt.

== Plot introduction ==
1,700 years after a deadly plague has wiped out the great civilizations of man, the survivors' descendants have built up a new, comparably primitive society. A group of explorers sets out on an expedition to find a legendary haven of knowledge and ancient wisdom, and in the process learns more about the people they only remember as "the Roadmakers".

== Plot ==
In a post-apocalypse North America where almost everyone was killed by a plague over 1,700 years prior, little is known about the ancient "Roadmaker" civilization that is said to have built the devastated ruins of enormous cities, and the magnificent roads that still cover the landscape. In the valley of the Mississippi River, a number of towns have united again, trade and science have begun anew. But along with trade comes the threat of new civilizations

When a copy of Mark Twain's novel A Connecticut Yankee in King Arthur's Court is discovered in the estate of the sole survivor of an earlier expedition to the north, a young woman named Chaka Milana, whose brother died in the previous expedition almost a decade ago, decides to gather a band of explorers and try to find Haven, a legendary stronghold where the knowledge of mankind is said to have been collected and kept safe for future generations. A long voyage ensues along the Mississippi River using various modes of transport such as horse, boats, and even air transport.

Taking the group on a long journey to the ruins of the ancient city of Chicago. Meeting civilizations such as the Illyrian scholars, tribal Tuks and raiders to the remnants of the old world and with their AI and machines which continue to follow their programming.

After losing several members of their team, such as Silas falling over the walkway, Jon to a gas leak explosion and Avila to pirates and traveling by an extraordinary means of transport that still functions after hundreds of years, the team eventually finds Haven. In their excitement at having finally reached their destination, Chaka and her group open the door that had sealed away the knowledge of the old world, spared from the destruction of the plague by the October Patrol, only to realize that they had made a mistake similar to the first expedition. By opening the doors in the underground facility they caused flooding to occur start the destruction of the books there. With quick thinking the group manages to save most of the books as the flooding subsides.

In the Epilogue it is explained that group made it back with most of the books saved from the underground facility. Chaka married Quait, Flojian settled down with a from the Canal, The trail from Devils Eye was renamed in honor of Jon Shannon, and along with the books brought back being reprinted so that all locations of the League can have the knowledge, the one that made the biggest impact to the new world was that from Silas and Chaka detailing their Odyssey to Haven.

== Major themes ==
One of the core themes of the book is the loss of knowledge and collective memory after an apocalyptic disaster: Even though the people of the Mississippi valley are aware of the remnants of the "Roadmaker" civilization, they have great difficulties understanding the purpose of certain concepts.

== Awards ==
The novel has won a Darrell Award.
