= Flesh and Fire =

2009 novel by Laura Anne Gilman

- Cover of Flesh and Fire, by Chris McGrath
- Author: Laura Anne Gilman
- Cover artist: Chris Mc Grath
- Language: English
- Series: The Vineart War
- Genre: Young adult Fantasy novel
- Publisher: Pocket Books
- Publication date: October 2009
- Publication place: United States
- Media type: Print (hardcover)
- Pages: 374
- ISBN: 978-1-4391-9154-5
- LC Class: PS3557.I4545F54 2009
- Followed by: Weight of Stone

Flesh and Fire is the first book in The Vineart War trilogy by Laura Anne Gilman. The story follows a slave named Jerzy, who is taken into an apprenticeship to become a Vineart. In the course of his studies his master becomes concerned by reports of attacks on Vinearts and sends Jerzy to study with another Vineart. He also instructs Jerzy to search for more information on the events that are occurring, but Jerzy is met with disapproval while there.

The book was a Nebula nominee for Best Novel of 2009, and on Library Journal's list of “Best Books of 2009″.

== Inspiration and influences ==
Gilman states that the inspiration for the book came from her agent, who jokingly suggested that she write a wine-based fantasy.

The Berengia, where the majority of the book takes place, is based on time Gilman spent Burgundy. While in Burgundy Gilman visited vineyards and spoke extensively with winemakers. Vineyards which Gilman visited in Italy are the basis of Corguruth.

== Plot summary ==
The book begins with a brief history of the Lands of Vin. It is narrated by a Washer, or preacher, of the Collegium, the main religious body. Nearly fifteen hundred years before the events that take place in Flesh and Fire, the Lands of Vin were ruled by arrogant prince-mages, who derived their power from spellwine. To put an end to the prince-mages' tyranny, Zatim, a demigod more commonly referred to as "Sin Washer", drastically reduced the magic contained in the spellgrapes used to make spellwine.

The prelude of the book describes a mutant grub infestation Master Vinart Sionio of Iaja discovers in his vineyards. The mutation is caused by magic, and could only have been created by another Vineart. The plot then comes to Jerzy, an adolescent slave owned by Master Vineart Malech of The Berengia. When Jerzy in entranced by the smell of crushed grapes during the harvest, Malech takes interest in Jerzy. Malech then tests Jerzy's ability to sense magic, and begins training Jerzy to become a Vineart.

During this time, the first of a series of strange events occur. First, an unusually large order of healwines is placed by the island kingdom of Atakus. Meanwhile, in Atakus, Prince Erebuh has just received a negotiator from a Vineart on the nearby island of Ekai concerning the loss of three ships carrying spellwine. This is highly unusual, as Atakus, a key port for ships, makes extensive use of spellwines to ensure fair weather. After Prince Erebuh gives the negotiator his reply, the prince's most trusted daughter, Thais, visits the negotiator, who kills her then commits suicide. Upon further investigation by Atakus's Master Vineart, Edon, it is discovered that the negotiator's actions were not his own, but under the influence of spellwine.

Malech continues teaching Jerzy the process in crafting spellwines. A few months into Jerzy's training, Malech's primary field becomes infested with rootglow, though it is out of season for the disease. The infestation is contained, but does significant damage to Malech's vines. Then a wagon sent to collect healwines for a nearby town is destroyed, with no apparent cause. Malech begins to send inquiries to other Vineart, and discovers they have also been seeing an unusual number of accidents.

In Aktakus, Prince Erebuh decides to completely isolate the island in a veil of fog, at the suggestion of Master Vineart Edon.

Cooper Shen, a member of the Cooperage Guild then brings Malech news of sea serpents sighted near Atakus, the first sighting in over seven generations. Two weeks later, a messenger from Prince Ranulf arrives, and tells Malech that a sea serpent has destroyed the entire town of Darcen. The messenger also brings a request for spellwines to cleanse the area contaminated by the sea serpent, and Malech sends Jerzy with the messenger to determine which spellwine will be necessary. When Jerzy reaches Prince Ranulf's encampment, the sea serpent resurfaces, but is quickly killed by spells which Prince Ranulf and Jerzy cast. Jerzy returns with pieces of the serpent, and Malech determines that it was created using magic.

Malech then sends Jerzy to study with Vineart Giordan of Aleppan, while secretly instructing Jerzy to find how much of the recent events has taken public interest. Giordan's dependence on the maiar of Aleppan is already under criticism from the Collegium, and when news of the exchange reaches Washers in Upper Altenne, they send Brother Darian to learn more about Jerzy.

Jerzy arrives in Aleppan by boat, and begins his training with Giordan. Ao, a trader with the Eastern Wind Trading Clan, notices Jerzy's attempts to eavesdrop on the conversations of nobles, and offers to teach Jerzy how to be less conspicuous. Near Atakus, a Caulic ship attempts to locate the island, and determine the cause of its disappearance. The Caulic fleet also intends to capture Atakus's valuable ports.

Jerzy also comes in contact with the maiar's daughter, Mahault, who shares how her father has not been acting normally in the past year. The sentiment is echoed by others who Jerzy meets with access to the court. After Ao and Mahault take interest in Jerzy's attempts to collect information, Jerzy solicits Ao's help in finding useful gossip.

When Jerzy secretly tastes Giordan's grapes to determine if they were used to create the sea serpent, he is spotted by Brother Darian. Darian accuses Jerzy of break the Command, and apostasy, a crime punishable by death. During the trial, Giordan attempts to defer all blame to Jerzy, but the maiar and Darian are intent on finding Giordan guilty. Giordan panics, and attacks the guards. Mahault and Ao use the commotion to free Jerzy and the city.

== Awards and nominations ==
Flesh and Fire was nominated for the Nebula Award for Best Novel in 2009.
