= Laura Anne Gilman =

American fantasy author (born 1967)

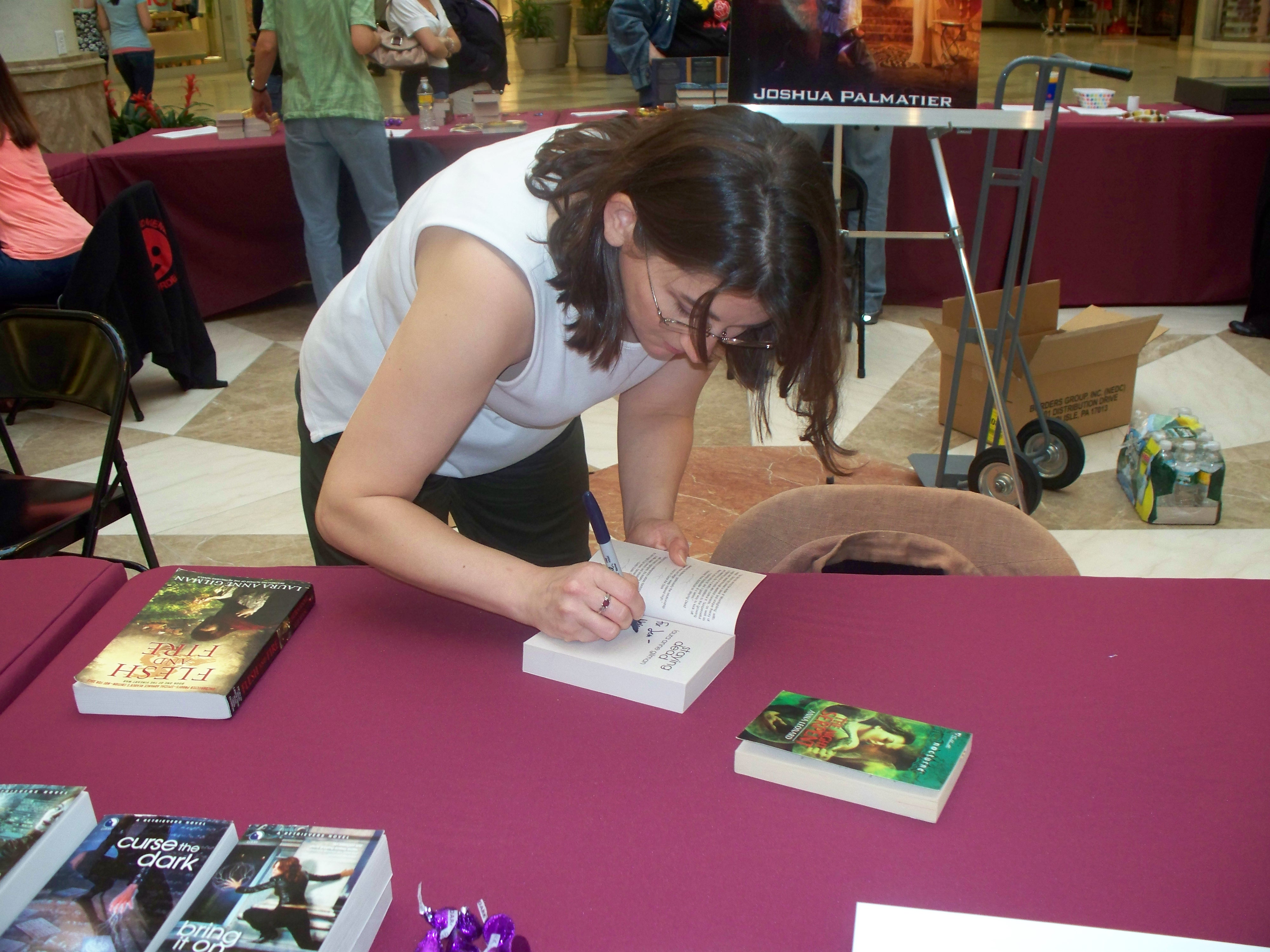
- An American fantasy author
- Born: 1967 (age 58–59); New Jersey
- Education: Skidmore College
- Occupation: Novelist
- Writing career
- Pen name: L.A. Kornetsky, Anna Leonard, L.A. Liverakos
- Period: 1994 - present
- Genres: Fantasy, Romance, Science fiction, Paranormal romance, Horror
- Website: www.lauraannegilman.net

Laura Anne Gilman (born 1967, New Jersey) is an American fantasy author.

== Biography ==
Laura Anne Gilman was born in 1967 in suburban New Jersey. She received a liberal arts education from Skidmore College in Saratoga Springs, New York, and was inducted into the Phi Alpha Theta honors society. She started her career in publishing as an editorial assistant in New York City. Laura Anne Gilman is a member of the Book View Cafe, Science Fiction and Fantasy Writers of America, and Novelists, Inc.

After publishing several short stories (her first professional fiction sale was 1994 to Amazing Stories), some media tie-ins, and a job as an executive editor, she published her first original novel Staying Dead, a "Cosa Nostradamus"-universe "Retrievers" book. The first book of a second series in this universe named "Paranormal Scene Investigations", Hard Magic, was published in 2010. Flesh and Fire, the first novel in the "Vineart War" series, was released in 2009. The "Vineart War" series deviates from the urban fantasy setting of the Cosa Nostradamus books, having more of a traditional fantasy feel. Flesh and Fire was nominated for the 2009 Nebula Award for Best Novel.

Gilman currently lives outside Seattle, Washington. She owns and runs d.y.m.k. productions, an editorial services company. She formerly managed the tasting room for Rocky Pond Winery in Chelan, Washington.

== Works ==
=== Cosa Nostradamus ===
The world of the Cosa Nostradamus is a world where magic is alive and well in a modern age. Cosa Nostradamus is the name given to the entire magical community – Human Talent and non-human ‘fatae.’

==== Retrievers ====
1. Staying Dead, Luna (July 2004) ISBN 0-373-80209-9

1.5 "Palimpsest" in Powers of Detection (Anthology), Dana Stabenow (ed.), Ace Books (Oct. 2004) ISBN 0-441-01197-7
2. Curse the Dark, Luna (July 2005) ISBN 0-373-80227-7
3. Bring It on, Luna (July 2006), ISBN 0-373-80240-4
3.5 "Overrush" in Murder by Magic: Twenty Tales of Crime and the Supernatural, Rosemary Edghill (ed.), Warner Books (Oct. 2004) ISBN 0-446-67962-3
4. Burning Bridges, Luna (June 2007), ISBN 0-373-80274-9
5. Free Fall, Luna (May 2008), ISBN 0-373-80267-6
6. Blood from Stone, Luna (April 2009), ISBN 0-373-80297-8

==== Paranormal Scene Investigations ====
1. Hard Magic, Luna (2010), ISBN 0-373-80313-3
2. Pack of Lies, Luna (2011)
3. Tricks of the Trade, Luna (2012)
4. Dragon Justice, Luna (2012)

==== Anthologies ====
- Stories of the Cosa Nostradamus, e-book, Book view Café (April 2010)

==== Grail Quest ====
1. The Camelot Spell, HarperCollins (March 2006), ISBN 0-06-077279-4
2. Morgain's Revenge, HarperCollins (July 2006), ISBN 0-06-077282-4
3. The Shadow Companion, HarperCollins (November 2006), ISBN 0-06-077286-7

=== The Vineart War ===
1. Flesh and Fire, Pocket Books (October 2009), ISBN 978-1-4391-0141-4 (Nebula Nominee)
2. Weight of Stone, Gallery Books (October 2010), ISBN 978-1-4391-0145-2
3. The Shattered Vine, Gallery Books (October 2011), ISBN 978-1-4391-0148-3

=== Devil's West ===
1. Silver on the Road, Saga Press (October 6, 2015), ISBN 978-1-4814-2968-9
2. The Cold Eye, Saga Press (January 10, 2017), ISBN 978-1-4814-2971-9 (Endeavour Award winner)
3. Red Waters Rising, Saga Press (June 26, 2018), ISBN 978-1481429740

=== Media tie-in novels ===
==== Quantum Leap ====
- Double or Nothing (with C. J. Henderson), Boxtree Ltd (July 1995), ISBN 0-7522-0682-6

==== Buffy the Vampire Slayer ====
- Visitors, (with Josepha Sherman), Pocket Books (May 1999), ISBN 0-671-02628-3
- Deep Water, (with Josepha Sherman), Pocket Books (February 2000), ISBN 0-671-03919-9

==== Poltergeist: The Legacy ====
- The Shadows Between as L.A. Liverakos, Ace Books (October 2000), ISBN 0-441-00703-1

=== Anthologies edited by ===
- Treachery and Treason, with Jennifer Heddler (ed.), ROC Books (March 2000), ISBN 0-451-45778-1
- Otherwere: Stories of Transformation, with Keith R. A. DeCandido (ed.), Ace Books (September 1996), ISBN 0-441-00363-X

=== Nonfiction ===
- Coping with Cerebral Palsy, Rosen Publishing Group (April 2001), ISBN 0-8239-3150-1
- Yeti, the Abominable Snowman, (Unsolved Mysteries), Rosen Publishing Group (December 2001), ISBN 0-8239-3565-5
- Economics: How Economics Works, Lerner Publications (January 2006), ISBN 0-8225-5757-6
- Practical Meerkat's 52 Bits of Useful Info for Young (and Old) Writers (January 2012), ISBN 978-1-61138-151-1

=== Novella ===
- Dragon Virus, Fairwood Press (June 2011), ISBN 1-933846-25-9

=== Short fiction ===
- "Along Came a Spider"
- "Apparent Horizon"
- "Catseye"
- "Clean Up Your Room!" in Don't Forget Your Spacesuit, Dear Jody Lynn Nye (ed.), Baen Books (July 1, 1996), ISBN 0-671-87732-1
- "A Day in the Life," in The Day the Magic Stopped, Baen Books (October 1995), ISBN 0-671-87690-2
- "Dispossession" (Maynstream/ghost story) in Spooks, Tina Jens (ed.), Twilight Tales Press
- "Don't You Want To Be Beautiful?"
- "Dragons"
- "Every Comfort of Home"
- "Exposure" in Blood Muse: Timeless Tales of Vampires in the Arts, Esther M. Friesner & Martin H. Greenberg (ed.), Dutton Adult (December 1, 1995), ISBN 1-55611-470-2
- "Harvey and Fifth"
- "His Essential Nature" in The Best of Dreams of Decadence, Roc Books (2003), ISBN 0-451-45918-0
- "In the End, the Beginning" in "The Good, the Bad, and the Uncanny: Tales of a Very Weird West", Jonathan Maberry (ed.) Outland Entertainment (2003), ISBN 9781954255685.
- "In the Night"
- "KidPro" in Wizards, Inc., DAW (6. November 2007), ISBN 0-7564-0439-8
- "Overrush" in Murder by Magic, Rosemary Edghill (ed.), Warner Books, 0-446-67962-3
- "Palimpsest" in Powers of Detection, Dana Stabenow (ed.), Ace Books,0-441-01197-7
- "Site Fourteen"
- "Sleepwork"
- "Source Material" (poem) in Tales from the Wonder Zone: Odyssey, Trifolium Books Inc, ISBN 1-55244-080-X (Prix Aurora Awards 2005 final ballot)
- "Sympathetic Magic"
- "Talent"
- "The Road Taken"
- "Turnings"
- "Where Angels Fear to Tread" in Highwaymen, Rogues, and Robbers, DAW Books (June 1997), ISBN 0-88677-732-1
- "Werelove" in Running with the Pack, Prime Books (May 2010), ISBN 1-60701-219-7

=== Pseudonymous works ===
==== L.A. Kornetsky ====
- Fixed, A Gin & Tonic Mystery, Gallery Books (November 2012), ISBN 9781451671643
- Collared, A Gin & Tonic Mystery, Gallery Books (•October 2013), ISBN 9781451671650
- Doghouse, A Gin & Tonic Mystery, Pocket Books (•July 2014), ISBN 9781476750040
- Clawed, A Gin & Tonic Mystery, Pocket Books (•May 2015), ISBN 9781476750088

==== Anna Leonard ====
- Dreamcatcher, Nocturne e-book (August 2008)
- The Night Serpent, Nocturne (September 2008), ISBN 0-373-61795-X
- The Hunted, Nocturne (April, 2010), ISBN 0-373-61833-6
- Shifter's Destiny (2012)

==== L. A. Liverakos ====
- The Shadows Between, a Poltergeist: The Legacy novel, Ace Books (October 2000), ISBN 0-441-00703-1
