= Omega (McDevitt novel) =

2003 novel by Jack McDevitt

- Author: Jack McDevitt
- Cover artist: Danilo Ducak
- Language: English
- Series: Academy Series - Priscilla "Hutch" Hutchins
- Genre: Science fiction, Mystery fiction
- Publisher: Ace Books
- Publication date: 2003 (Hardcover edition)
- Media type: Print (Paperback & Hardback)
- ISBN: 0-441-01046-6
- Preceded by: Chindi
- Followed by: Odyssey

Omega is a book by Jack McDevitt that won the John W. Campbell Award, and was nominated for the Nebula Award in 2004.

The mystery surrounding the destructive "Omega Clouds" (which are introduced in The Engines of God) is left unexplored until Omega.

== Plot summary ==
A world of humanoid beings is discovered to be in the path of an Omega cloud, mysterious clouds of energy floating in space which attack and destroy anything with right angles. Hutch is part of an expedition to save them if possible, using a strikingly new discovery.
