= John Harris (artist) =

British artist and illustrator (born 1948)

- Born: John Harris; 29 July 1948 (age 78); London, England
- Education: Exeter College of Art
- Known for: Illustration
- Notable work: Fire Series, NASA
- Movement: Science fiction, imaginative realism, landscape, abstract
- Patrons: Sinclair Research, Philips Electronics
- Website: www.alisoneldred.com/john-harris

John Harris (born 29 July 1948) is a British artist and illustrator, known for working in the science fiction genre. His paintings have been used on book covers for many authors, including Orson Scott Card, Arthur C. Clarke, Isaac Asimov, Frederik Pohl, Ben Bova, Wilbur Smith, Jack Vance, Ann Leckie, and John Scalzi. His work has covered many genres and although he made his name in the science-fiction genres, he is now exploring a new realm, the imaginative realism of aerial landscapes.

== Biography ==
Born on 29 July 1948 in London, England, Harris began painting aged 14 and entered Luton College of Art at the age of 16. After completing a foundation course, he entered Exeter College of Art in 1967 to study painting. Graduating in 1970 he travelled and studied transcendental meditation, an increasing influence on his works. On his return to England in 1976, Harris began exploring the theme of monumental scale and space, producing a series of science fiction art. In the late 1970s he joined Young Artists, the premier agency for the emerging movement of science fiction art in the UK.

Harris continued to specialise in large-scale commissions for companies such as Philips Electronics and Shell. His illustrations during this period have now become collector's items, including Jack McDevitt's Nebula Award-winning Seeker. His painting MASS: The Building of FTL1 was used by Psygnosis for the cover of their 1990 video game Awesome.

During the early 1980s Harris was commissioned by Sinclair Research to produce cover art for the user manuals for the ZX81, ZX Spectrum, ZX Interface 1 and ZX Microdrive computer products.

In 1984 Harris was commissioned to create a painting of the Space Shuttle Endeavour launch at NASA's Kennedy Space Centre. He was captivated by the intense tangerine glow created by the craft's exhaust and made a painting of the shuttle's gantry tower, bathed in light. That work is now part of the Smithsonian Museum Collection.

In 1998 Royal Caribbean commissioned him to paint a number of large canvases to be displayed as permanent fixtures in their new range of ocean cruise ships, resulting in over 70 marine paintings - many of them depicting J-class yachts.

In 2000 Paper Tiger Books published a collection of Harris's work, Mass.

Rainmaker Entertainment based in Vancouver, hired Harris in 2007, to work on The Weinstein Company's movie, Escape from Planet Earth.

In 2010 Harris became a regular contributor to the exhibitions of the Symposium of Imaginative Realism (Illuxcon).

In 2014, Titan Books published a new collection of his works, entitled Beyond the Horizon; The Art of John Harris.

Harris lives in Devon. He is married to Sarah Harris and has two children, Sophie and Ben.

In 2015 Harris received the Chesley Award for Life Time Achievement.

== Awards ==
In 2008 and 2014, Harris was nominated for the Hugo Award for Best Professional Artist.

In 2015, he won the Chesley Award for Lifetime Artistic Achievement.

== Publications ==
- Mass. Paper Tiger Books, May 2000, ISBN 978-1-85585-783-4
