= Seeker (McDevitt novel) =

2005 novel by Jack McDevitt

- First edition
- Author: Jack McDevitt
- Cover artist: John Harris
- Language: English
- Series: Alex Benedict
- Genre: Science Fiction
- Publisher: Ace Books
- Publication date: 2005
- Pages: 368
- ISBN: 0-441-01329-5
- OCLC: 60798500
- Dewey Decimal: 813/.54 22
- LC Class: PS3563.C3556 S44 2005
- Preceded by: Polaris
- Followed by: The Devil's Eye

Seeker is a 2005 science fiction novel by American writer Jack McDevitt. It won the Nebula Award for Best Novel in 2006. This is the third installment in McDevitt's Alex Benedict series, following A Talent for War (1989) and Polaris (2004).

== Synopsis ==
The story is set approximately 10,000 years in the future, after civilization has expanded to inhabit countless worlds. Alex Benedict, dealer in antiques, and his partner Chase Kolpath are astroarchaeologists involved in the examination of abandoned bases and deserted space-craft in search of valuable items.

Alex is approached by a mysterious woman who asks him to ascertain the value of a strange cup riddled with archaic symbols. They discover that the cup is a 9,000-year-old relic from one of the first faster-than-light vehicles built, the Seeker. This was a colony ship crewed by a faction known as the "Margolians" who were fleeing the then-oppressive society of Earth in hopes of establishing a free world. Records indicate that they succeeded, as the Seeker made several voyages, but they kept the location of their colony world a secret.

Alex and Chase discover who brought this cup back with some insight. By retracing the route of these long-forgotten space explorers, they begin to get an idea of where the Seeker was found. Excitedly, they set off in hopes of finding the colony of "Margolia".

== Recognition ==
- Nebula Award winner, 2006
- John W. Campbell Award nominee, 2006
- Southeastern Science Fiction Achievement Award winner, 2006
