= Coming Home (McDevitt novel) =

2014 novel by Jack McDevitt

- First edition
- Author: Jack McDevitt
- Cover artist: John Harris
- Language: English
- Series: Alex Benedict (Book 7)
- Genre: Science fiction
- Publisher: Ace
- Publication date: November 4, 2014
- Publication place: United States
- Media type: Print, e-book
- Pages: 368 pp.
- ISBN: 978-0425260876
- Preceded by: Firebird

Coming Home is a science fiction novel by American writer Jack McDevitt. It is the seventh in the Alex Benedict series, and was released in November 2014. Coming Home was nominated for the 2014 Nebula award for best novel.

== Plot ==
The story is set approximately 9,000 years in the future (12th millennium AD), after humanity has expanded to inhabit countless worlds. Alex Benedict and his partner Chase Kolpath are antique dealers who run a firm called Rainbow Enterprises.

During the plot, several elements of the future history are disclosed, such as the global Dark Age and the loss of artifacts and records of that time, the 26th century interstellar colonization, and the 4th millennium unification of Planet Earth.

An intriguing artifact (a Corbett transmitter, which allows communications through hyperspace) that dates back to the Golden Age of Spaceflight is found in the home of deceased astroarcheologist Garnett Baylee. The source of the artifact is a mystery as Baylee never announced such a discovery.

While this is happening, the Capella, a cruise spaceship which disappeared over a decade ago, is expected to resurface from hyperspace, possibly leading to the evacuation of the spacecraft. This is significant because Benedict's uncle Gabe was on the Capella.

== Reception ==
The novel received good reviews.

== Trivia ==
The novel mentions the Academy Series (Priscilla Hutchins). A Priscilla Hutchins book is mentioned as Sci-Fi literature of early space age.

In Germany, the Kindle edition is published under the title Apollo.
