= Deepsix =

2000 novel by Jack McDevitt

- First edition
- Author: Jack McDevitt
- Cover artist: Chris Moore
- Language: English
- Series: Academy Series - Priscilla "Hutch" Hutchins
- Genre: Science fiction, mystery
- Publisher: EOS Books
- Publication date: September 2000 (special edition)
- Media type: Print (Paperback & Hardback)
- Pages: 432 (hardcover)
- ISBN: 978-0061051241 (hardcover)
- Preceded by: The Engines of God
- Followed by: Chindi

Deepsix is a novel by American science fiction author Jack McDevitt.

== Plot summary ==
Priscilla "Hutch" Hutchins leads a crew of space archaeologists to investigate a lost civilization on planet Maleiva III (aka Deepsix) with only a window of weeks before the planet is destroyed by the impending collision with a rogue gas giant.

== Reception ==
Deepsix was a finalist for the John W. Campbell Memorial Award for Best Science Fiction Novel.
