= Time Travelers Never Die =

2009 book by Jack McDevitt

- Author: Jack McDevitt
- Cover artist: Tony Mauro
- Language: English
- Genre: Science fiction
- Publisher: Ace Hardcover
- Publication date: September 3, 2009
- Publication place: United States
- Media type: Print (hardback & paperback), e-book, Audiobook
- Pages: 384
- ISBN: 0441017630

Time Travelers Never Die, written by Jack McDevitt, is a 2009 science fiction book about time travel and the consequences it can cause. The novel is a reworking of McDevitt's 1996 novella of the same title, which in 1997 was nominated for both a Hugo Award and a Nebula Award. McDevitt rewrote the story because he was inspired to work with time travel once again.

== Plot summary ==
After his father Michael Shelborne mysteriously disappears, Adrian "Shel" Shelborne receives a package from his father with instructions to follow if something were to happen to him. Inside the package there are four devices that the note instructs him to destroy. After toying with the device a little, Shel discovers that the devices have the ability to take you anywhere at any point in time.

After figuring this concept out, Shel decides to go back in time to the last time he talked to his father on the phone and find out why he disappeared. After finding his father in the past, his father explains to him the dangers of time travel. Shel's father explains that the devices can be used to go to events in time and become a part of them, but to interfere with the events could lead to fatal consequences. After taking this into consideration Shel's father decides to go back in time and return to the present to avoid causing a paradox in time. When his father still doesn't return, Shel enlists the help of his best friend Dave Dryden to help him find his father in time.

They eventually find his father's tombstone stating that he died in 1637. Going back to the year 1604, Shel finds his father to be a very old man. Shel's father explains to him that when he went back in time, the device got damaged when he was teleported on to a sheet of thin ice rather than dry land. He also explains that he can not leave because Shel and Dave have seen his grave site, and taking him out of that time line would cause a dangerous paradox.

After finding Shel's father, Dave and Shel return to their base time period. They spend the next few months time traveling to the many events of the time line. However, tragedy strikes when a lightning bolt strikes Shel's apartment, burning the place to the ground. After a brief investigation and autopsy, it is determined that the burnt body found at the apartment is Shel. After the funeral, Shel appears before Dave to explain to him that the body in the grave is not his body, but the body of his future self.

Feeling that his fate is sealed in the event of what happened that night, Shel runs away to live his life out in the timeline. Dave not wanting to let his friend live in fear of his own fate, enlists the help of Shel's fiancee Helen. Together they are able to fake the death of Shel by stealing a body from the scene of an auto accident and placing it in the apartment on the night of the fire. After eliminating the possibility of a deadly paradox, Dave and Helen set off to find where Shel ran off to. When they find him, they discover that a few years have passed since they last saw him. Knowing that they can never return to his life that has already ended, Shel and Helen live out their married life as time travelers.
