= The Engines of God =

1994 novel by Jack McDevitt

- First edition
- Author: Jack McDevitt
- Cover artist: Bob Eggleton
- Language: English
- Series: Academy Series - Priscilla "Hutch" Hutchins
- Genre: Science fiction, mystery
- Publisher: Ace Books
- Publication date: 1994 (Hardcover edition)
- Media type: Print (Paperback & Hardback)
- Pages: 419 (paperback)
- ISBN: 0-441-00077-0 (Paperback)
- Followed by: Deepsix

The Engines of God is a science fiction novel by American author Jack McDevitt, published in 1994.

== Plot overview ==
A group of xeno-archaeologists, together with interstellar pilot Priscilla Hutchins, attempt to unravel the mysteries surrounding huge, mysterious monuments left near several habitable worlds, including one on a moon orbiting Saturn.

== Plot summary ==
=== Background ===
Humans confirmed the existence of intelligent extraterrestrial life beyond Earth when they discovered a statue of a bipedal alien on Iapetus, a moon of Saturn. After developing faster-than-light travel, humans quickly discovered other mysterious Monuments in nearby planetary systems. However, details about the "Monument-Makers" themselves remained elusive.

Even after decades of exploring, humans had found disappointingly few habitable worlds, and even fewer signs of intelligent alien life. At the time, only three examples had been identified:

(a) The planet Pinnacle, which had evidently been home to an intelligent society that became extinct nearly a million years earlier, and had left very little trace of themselves on their now non-inhabitable planet;

(b) The planet Quraqua, which had many similarities to Earth, had been home to an intelligent species (the Quraquans) until they became extinct just a few centuries prior; and

(c) Inakademeri, a.k.a. "Nok", a moon of a ringed gas giant, and home to the only known non-human intelligent species still alive; the "Noks" had developed technology roughly equivalent to Earth's early 20th century. At the time of discovery they were engaged in a global conflict roughly analogous to World War I.

The lack of other habitable worlds posed a significant problem because Earth was becoming increasingly inhospitable to humans and other species. By 2202, global climate change had led to significant rise in sea levels and many other weather-related changes. Food shortages and famine were rampant throughout the world. Many people were now convinced that humans could only avoid going extinct if they could establish an off-world colony.

=== Plot ===
The story primarily follows Priscilla Hutchins (also known as "Hutch"), a prestigious starship pilot for the Academy of Science and Technology. The Academy organizes and finances many on- and off-world scientific endeavors. Hutch receives orders to take the Academy FTL ship "Winckelmann" (or "Wink") to Quraqua. There she will evacuate the archaeological research team of scientists, along with the artifacts they have gathered over the past ~30 years of study.

The now-extinct Quraquans had a complex civilization spanning tens of thousands of years. The science team had expected to have more-or-less unlimited time to complete their scientific discoveries before a massive terraforming project was initiated on the planet. The remnants of Quraquan civilization would be destroyed by terraforming process, which was funded by a wealthy, politically powerful corporation called Kozmik. Kozmik's political efforts had moved up the timeline for terraforming, despite the Academy's resistance. The terraforming process was scheduled to launch several weeks after arrival of the "Wink."

A total evacuation of all humans from the planet was ordered so that terraforming could commence. This process includes sequential detonation of multiple nuclear bombs to rapidly melt the polar icecaps and induce volcanic activity. Ultimately, the result would be a greenhouse effect that warmed the planet to human-tolerable levels and released sufficient liquid water to form rivers and oceans.

Just before Hutch was scheduled to leave Earth, the Quraquan science team, led by the Henry Jacobi, made a significant discovery: they discovered a carving that bore an uncanny resemblance to the statue on Iapetus, which was presumed to depict one of the Monument-Makers. Even more perplexing, this carving depicted a Monument-Maker in the form of a god of death. Given this startling connection between the Quraquans and the Monument-Makers, the Academy desperately tried to postpone the terraforming process so they could find additional artifacts. They failed to delay the process. However, a leading expert on the Monument-Makers, Richard Wald, joined Hutch on the voyage to Quraqua, so he could lend his expertise to the dig during the little time they had remaining.

After an FTL journey through space lasting nearly a month, Hutch and Richard arrive at the Quraquan star system. Before landing on the planet, Richard wanted to explore a mysterious structure on the planet's moon. Called "Oz," this monument consisted of an assembly of gigantic, smooth cubes and rectangles. Although Oz superficially resembled a city, the structures were completely solid, with no interior spaces or exterior features. No theories about the purpose of Oz had yet been proposed. Many scientists, including Richard, did not think that Oz was built by the Monument-Makers: all other known Monuments were elegant and many were floating in space, and this faux-city seemed crude and unwieldy by comparison. However, with the discovery of a Monument-Maker depiction on the planet below, Richard was intent to re-evaluate the potential link between Oz and the Monument-Makers.

Ultimately, they discovered several facts about Oz:

(a) The monument was built approximately 9000 B.C (Earth time scale).

(b) Many of the structures were damaged and had mysterious scorch-marks, which also dated to roughly 9000 B.C.

(c) The "city's" layout was perfectly symmetrical and composed of regular cubic units, with the notable exception of two cylindrical towers.

(d) One of the towers held a short inscription in one of the ancient languages of the Quraquans. This observation was bewildering because the Quraquans never developed space travel. Someone else (the Monument-Makers?) must have inscribed it. Although the scientists could identify the language, they could not read the inscription. Consequently, deciphering Quraquan language was a pressing need.

After investigating Oz, Hutch and Richard make their way to Quraqua's surface. Hutch makes one more attempt to get the terraforming operation postponed by contacting the terraforming project's director, Melanie Truscott, who lived in a space station orbiting Quraqua. Unfortunately, Truscott is dead-set on adhering to her orders, and refuses to delay the operation for even a day. Faced with this reality, Hutch attempts to fulfill her mission to evacuate the Academy personnel and artifacts from the surface before the deadline. Her efforts are hampered by the determination of the scientists to squeeze every second they can from their remaining time. They refuse to depart until it is absolutely necessary.

Over the ~30 years of their work, the science team had learned that Quraquans had existed for many thousands of years, but never achieved a high level of technology. Instead, the civilization stagnated for long periods of time, and experienced many Dark Ages. Notably, they discovered several "discontinuities" suggesting repeated, rapid, planet-wide disasters that decimated the Quraquan population. One such event coincided with the construction and damaging of Oz.

The science team was now excavating "The Temple of Winds," a sprawling complex that served many different functions over its thousands of years of history. The Temple was originally above ground, but tectonic forces had lowered it below the current sea level. Consequently, the team was based in an underwater dome structure, and excavation of the site required dealing with unusual obstacles, including removal of shifting mud and silt.

Around this time, Richard makes some inquiries to a colleague who was studying the planet, Nok. He learned that, similar to Quraqua, Nok had also suffered mysterious discontinuities in its history. A pattern emerged from this information: on both planets, the discontinuities were separated by roughly 8,000 years, suggesting that the planets had recurring global catastrophes that occurred at 8,000-year intervals. In addition, Richard learned that new Monuments had been discovered in orbit around Nok. These monuments were a series of free-floating, enormous cubes, which were scorched and damaged, very reminiscent of Oz.

Given the short time remaining before all Quraquan structures on the planet would be lost, the scientists' focus was to obtain more examples of "Linear C," the language of the mysterious inscription on Oz. The team's exophilologist, Maggie Tufu, was convinced that she could decode the message, if they could just find additional examples of text to add to their limited library. To accomplish this goal, the team was excavating at break-neck pace deeper and deeper into the unexplored temple ruins. The dig team discovered a printing press that could unlock the Linear C language, when disaster struck.

Although Hutch had begun shuttling the artifacts to the "Wink," the Kozmik terraforming team was increasingly frustrated with the slow pace of evacuation. In fact, they were convinced that the Academy team would willfully ignore the terraforming deadline. As a result, the Kosmik team decided to encourage the evacuation by demonstrating the dangers of remaining on Quraqua. As part of the terraforming process, they had gathered thousands of icy comets that would be sent to the planet to increase the amount of water. They nudged a small comet out of orbit and crashed it into the sea, creating a tsunami that significantly damaged the dig site. Although the personnel had enough warning to shelter themselves from this "unfortunate error," the wave caused the room holding the printing press to collapse before excavation could be completed. The printing press was buried and damaged.

The team was more determined than ever to recover at least some of the printing press artifacts. They wanted at least the chases that held sequences of symbols ready to print. The evacuation proceeded with only four people left on the planet, working to remove the chases. They not quite able to load the machines and themselves by the time the deadline passed, and the nuclear devices were detonated at the planet's poles. In a highly difficult maneuver, Hutch was able to pull the remaining individuals and key parts of the presses from the excavation. However, Richard Wald, the Monument-Maker expert and the last person pulled from the excavation, was killed.

The loss of Wald angered many of the team, and there were differing opinions as to who held the most blame for Richard's death: Henry (team leader) for pushing his team too hard in the face of danger; Maggie, for her insistence that the alien machines had to be recovered; or even Hutch, who Henry felt had only hurt the situation by her desperate pleas for the team to abandon the effort.

Fortunately, Maggie was soon able to decipher the perplexing inscription from Oz: "Farewell and good fortune. Seek us by the light of the horgon's eye." A horgon was a mythical Quraquan beast, and the passage referred to a part of a stellar constellation, pointing the way to the Monument-Makers' home. Using the out-of-place cylindrical towers on Oz as waypoint markers, Hutch and Frank Carson (the second-in-command of the Quraqua expedition) were able to make a list of potential stars to which the passage might refer. Using a powerful radio telescope, they surveyed all the candidate stars and found one that was broadcasting a faint artificial transmission – Beta Pacifica.

Ecstatic with the breakthrough, the Academy quietly approved an urgent mission to investigate the Beta Pacifica star system. The mission would consist of Hutch, Frank, Maggie, Janet, and George Hackett, another veteran from Quraqua. At the last minute, they received orders from the government to halt their mission – apparently, the idea of charging into the potential heart of an unknown space-faring civilization was something they didn't trust to an Academy scout ship – but the crew willfully ignored the instruction and leaped into hyperspace on their weeks-long journey to Beta Pacifica.

They knew that the source of the radio transmission did not originate on a planet, but at a point in space roughly 15 AU from the star. On the long journey, the five crewmates grew quite close, and a romance blossomed between Hutch and George. Upon arrival at Beta Pacifica, disaster struck again. They emerged from their jump extremely close to a mysterious and enormous black mass larger than Earth's moon, but which, inexplicably, the instruments claimed had no measurable mass. At their current velocity, they could not avoid hitting the object and the crew resigned themselves to a quick death via collision. Shockingly, the ship somehow passed "through" the object, but with heavy damage in the process. They lost many ship's systems and sent out a general distress call to the nearest human presences at Quraqua and Nok. They received word that rescue would come from Nok, but would take days to arrive. At one point, it appeared as if they would run out of air before rescue arrived, but Hutch managed to remedy the problem at the last minute. Eventually, help arrived not from Nok, but instead from Quraqua, in the form of their former foe, Melanie Truscott. Truscott had been accompanying Kosmik employees back to Earth when she diverted her course to lend assistance to the crew of the "Winckelmann."

At first, Truscott was unwilling to stay in the Beta Pacifica system for any reason, because she was anxious to complete her mission to return employees to Earth. She quickly changed her mind after a rapid series of tantalizing discoveries made it clear that this star system was of major importance. First, they determined that the object that the "Winckelmann" (Hutch's ship) ran into was a vast dish-shaped telescope, and that the alien radio transmission emanated from its center. Further, the dish was one of eight such objects orbiting the star, although the others appeared to be defunct. In addition, the structure was "organic" in nature, and had already nearly healed the damage caused by the impact event. The ship survived the collision was because the dish was extremely thin. The telescope array was not currently pointed at any particular object in the sky, but they determined that roughly 10,000 years ago, the network would have been observing the Large Magellanic Cloud, the largest satellite galaxy of the Milky Way.

Besides the dish array, the star system had one terrestrial planet that bore a startling resemblance to Earth in terms of physical characteristics. From all appearances, settling of the planet could, in principle, begin immediately, with no terraforming required. The crew had high hopes that they had discovered the home planet of the Monument-Makers, but, if so, they were no longer there. However, there were two anomalies. First, the largest of the planet's four moons had a giant cube of stone, which was damaged and scorched just like the Monuments at Quraqua and Nok. Second, a space station orbited the planet. They immediately set out to investigate the station. To their dismay, the space station was not created by a highly advanced race, as the Monument-Makers were known to be. Instead, the level of technology was below current human standards.

Nevertheless, the Academy crew, along with Truscott and her lieutenant, boarded the powerless and airless space station to investigate. What they discovered was very unsettling: dozens of alien corpses, apparently the same race as the Monument-Makers, who had all committed suicide by strapping themselves to their chairs and venting the atmosphere of the station.

No one could come up with a good reason for this event, which they all found very disturbing. Nor could anyone explain why the Monument-Makers were inhabiting a station of such inferior technology.

One theory was that the station remained from their earliest days of space exploration, but in order for that to be true, the station would have to be many tens of thousands of years old, which did not seem plausible.

Luckily, in order to date the station, they discovered a photograph of the planet's four moons in perfect alignment, and extrapolated how long ago such a configuration would have happened. The answer was 4743 B.C., a time well after the Monument-Makers were known to possess advanced technology.

The surface of the planet held only ruins, and the Academy team went down to investigate. What they found were structures much too primitive to have been made by a hyper-advanced space-faring race.

Sadly, tragedy again befell the Academy crew when they were attacked by a mysteriously unrelenting horde of predatory crab-like creatures with razor sharp claws and mandibles. George, Maggie, and their Kosmik pilot were killed, and Frank and Janet were severely wounded. They escaped thanks to Hutch's piloting skills, but were saddened by the price they paid.

Back on the Kosmik starship, though, Hutch was struck by inspiration. When she included the dates of the Discontinuities of Quraqua and Nok with the final days of the primitive Beta Pacifica space station, she discovered a repeating pattern of sweeping devastation that spread outward, going from one planet to the next.

If her theory was correct, she could extrapolate the current position of this destructive wave in space: they could plot a course and go see what had caused numerous disasters across multiple inhabited planets.

Leaving the Kosmik ship for the newly arrived Academy vessel, they set out, once again, to try and solve their cosmic mystery once and for all.

They arrived in an unnamed star system that had already been surveyed decades previously. At first they found nothing unusual, and decided to make their OWN monument – a set of giant cubic structures, in an attempt to recreate the environment of the other disasters.

They used a cutting laser and a shuttlecraft to begin to transform some natural stone plateaus into giant cubes, just like at the other planets.

Shortly thereafter, they detected two strange anomalies – giant clouds in space, traveling at a high speed. Although the clouds were quite large – planet sized, at least – they were far too small to be natural objects. With insufficient mass, they should have been ripped apart by the star system's gravity.

One of the mysterious clouds was on the far side of the planetary system, but one would pass relatively close to the moon on which they were creating their fake Monuments. The mystery deepened when, suddenly, the nearby cloud began to change direction and reduce speed, on a direct course for the moon and the new monuments. This was, obviously, inconsistent with any natural phenomena.

In the end, the mystery cloud was drawn towards both the cubic monument and the roughly cubic shuttlecraft, and annihilated them both. The crew survived by evacuating the shuttle, and finally discovered the nemesis that had plagued advanced societies for thousands of years. In fact, they deduced that biblical disasters on Earth corresponded to the pattern of destruction as well.

They arrived at the conclusion that the Monument-Makers had constructed their creations in an attempt to be lures for the deadly clouds – which came to be called Omega clouds. They attempted to save the populations of the planets in question by luring the clouds away from the right-angles and regular structures of their buildings and roads by putting geometric shapes in other locations.

This strategy had not succeeded, and the clouds had attacked the alien populations and the Monuments. The clouds had even hit the Monument-Makers themselves, throwing their society into a technological dark age – the space station and ruined buildings at Beta Pacifica were the remnants of their second, lesser civilization, which itself was nearly annihilated when the cycle repeated on its 8,000-year timescale.

It was discovered that the remnants of the space-faring Monument-Makers – or Cholois, as they were called – were observing the Large Magellanic Cloud because they evacuated to that location.

The implications were that the Omega clouds menace the entire galaxy, and the only way to escape them is to leave the galaxy entirely. In fact, the cycle of the clouds meant that they would be upon Earth in just 1,000 years.

Given that the Monument-Makers were more advanced than humanity, and that they had even more time to deal with the problem and failed, the outlook for Earth's future looks bleak.

== Characters ==
- Priscilla Hutchins - Academy starpilot (FTL and shuttles)
- Frank Carson - Second in command of the Quraquan research team, former colonel in the army of the North American Union
- Janet Allegri - Archaeologist on Quraquan research team
- Richard Wald - Senior archaeologist, among first to work on non-human civilizations
- Henry Jacobi - Academy archaeologist, leader of the Quraquan research team
- Linda Thomas - Archaeologist on Quraquan research team
- Maggie Tufu: Exophilologist (or code breaker).
- Melanie Truscott: Director of "Kosmik" terraforming operation on Quraqua
- Cal Hartlett: Financial analyst with the brokerage firm of Forman & Dyer.
- George Hackett: Engineer of Quraquan research team
