= Christopher Rose (electrical engineer) =

American electrical engineer

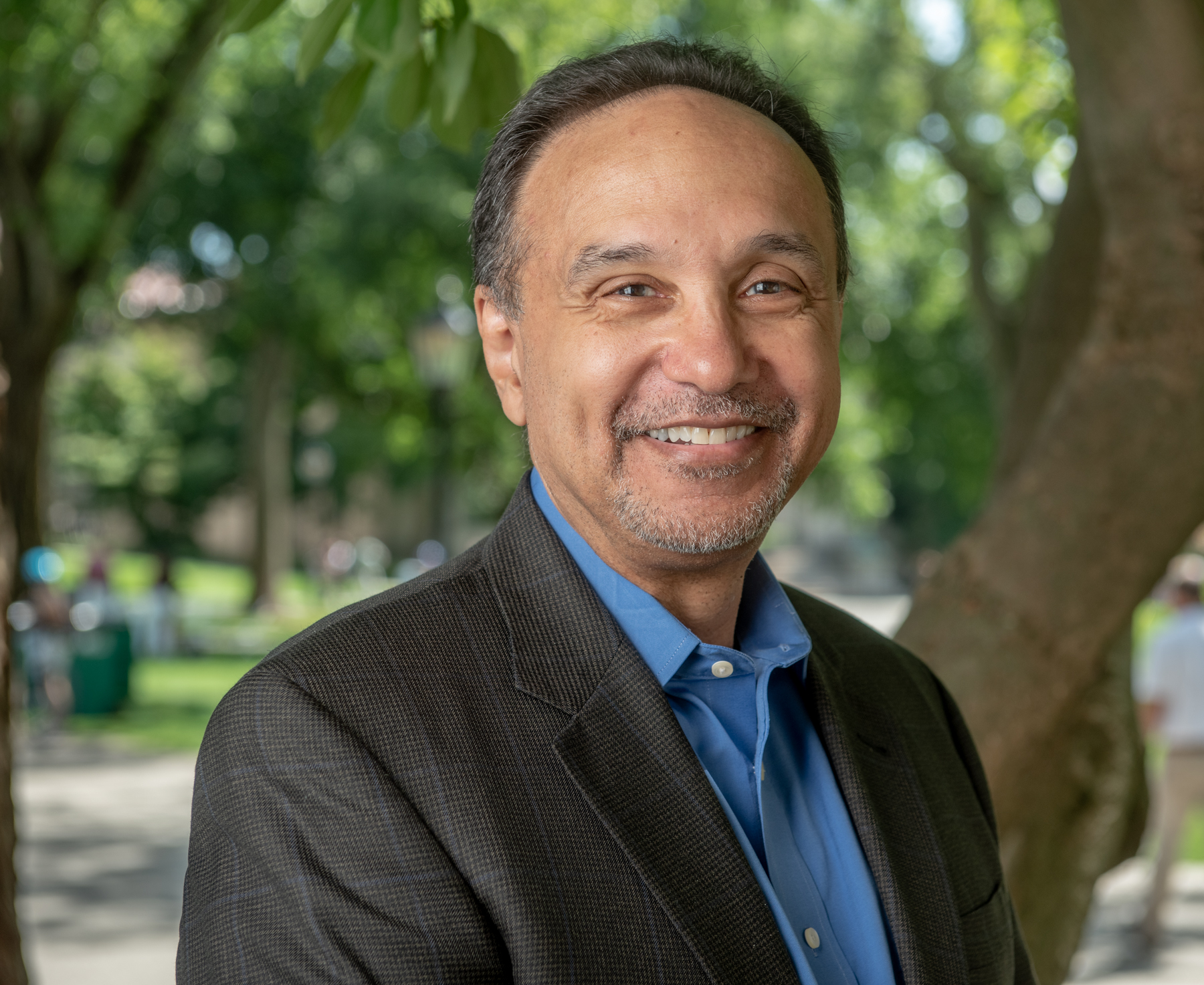
- Born: January 9, 1957 (age 69); New York City, New York
- Citizenship: United States
- Education: Massachusetts Institute of Technology
- Known for: Inscribed Matter Communication, Wireless Systems, Molecular Communication
- Awards: 2003 Marconi Prize Paper Award, 2007 IEEE Fellow, 2022 IEEE Undergraduate Teaching Award
- Scientific career
- Fields: Communication Theory, Information Theory
- Workplaces: Rutgers University, Brown University
- Doctoral advisor: Thomas F. Weiss
- Website: brown.edu/worldofbits

Christopher Rose (born January 9, 1957) is a professor of engineering, former associate provost at Brown University in Rhode Island and a founding member of WINLAB at Rutgers University in New Jersey. He was educated at the Massachusetts Institute of Technology; SB'79, SM'81, Ph.D'85 all in Course VI (Electrical Engineering and Computer Science). On September 2, 2004, an article by Christopher Rose and Gregory Wright, titled Inscribed matter as an energy-efficient means of communication with an extraterrestrial civilization, appeared on the cover of Nature with the headline "Dear ET...".

The article argued that wireless communication is an inefficient means for potential communication over interstellar distances owing to both the unavoidable reduction of signal strength as distance squared and that information can be densely encoded (inscribed) in matter. The article also suggested that information-bearing physical artifacts might be a more likely first form of contact with an extraterrestrial civilization than radio signals. Following the publication, Rose and Wright's idea was featured by a number of news sources including the BBC World Service, National Public Radio and The New York Times with an article by Dennis Overbye and a subsequent editorial. Rose also offered related commentary on the library carried aboard the SpaceIL Beresheet Lunar Lander.

Rose is an IEEE Fellow cited for "Contributions to Wireless Communication Systems Theory", winner of the 2003 IEEE Marconi Prize Paper Award in wireless communications, and the recipient of the IEEE 2022 Undergraduate Teaching Award.

== Early life and education ==
Rose was born in New York City in 1957 and raised in Harlem until his early teens, when his family moved to Co-op City in the Bronx, where he lived until entering college. He was educated at the Massachusetts Institute of Technology, receiving the S.B. (1979), S.M. (1981), and Ph.D. (1985) degrees, all in electrical engineering and computer science. He was supported in graduate school by the Bell Laboratories Cooperative Research Fellowship Program and his doctoral advisor was Thomas F. Weiss.

Related to Tricia Rose (sister).
