= Chindi (novel) =

2002 novel by Jack McDevitt

- First edition
- Author: Jack McDevitt
- Cover artist: Edwin Herder
- Language: English
- Series: Academy Series - Priscilla "Hutch" Hutchins
- Genre: Science fiction, mystery
- Publisher: Ace Books
- Publication date: July 2002 (Hardcover edition)
- Media type: Print (Paperback & Hardback)
- Pages: 528 (October 28, 2003, paperback)
- ISBN: 0-441-01102-0 (Paperback)
- OCLC: 53706568
- Preceded by: Deepsix
- Followed by: Omega

Chindi is a 2002 science fiction novel by American writer Jack McDevitt, part of starship pilot Priscilla "Hutch" Hutchins series.

== Plot overview ==
Alien stealth satellites have been discovered orbiting various habitable planets (eventually including Earth) across space. The Contact Society, a group of rich alien enthusiasts, set out in a brand new superluminal, with Hutch as captain, in search of the source of the strange satellites. As they travel they find a species of sentient spider-like beings who destroyed themselves in a nuclear war, a species of avian beings who look beautiful but are really savages, and a technically advanced alien retreat on an artificial moon. Then Chindi is discovered. A giant asteroid ship, almost 16 km (9.9 miles) long, it seems to have no reasonable use; but when they enter it, they begin to discover its true purpose.
