= Cauldron (McDevitt novel) =

2007 novel by Jack McDevitt

First edition (publ. Ace Books) Cover art by Larry Price

Cauldron is a 2007 science fiction novel by American author Jack McDevitt. It is the sixth novel in the Academy series, featuring Priscilla Hutchins.

== Plot summary ==
Humanity now generally disregards spaceflight, and space exploration is in massive decline. Hutchins has retired from flying in space and now spends her days throwing fundraisers in order to finance space exploration through private investors. The space program is on the edge of being terminated, when a physicist named Jon Silvestri announces that he has completed a much more efficient faster-than-light-speed engine, capable of reaching destinations in mere fractions of the time previously required, travelling much further than Pluto in just under eight seconds.

With this new drive, destinations such as the galactic core are mere months of travel away. Hutch and the characters in the novel use that engine to journey to the centre of the galaxy, while making stops at a few points of interest including Sigma 2711, a star system 14,000 light years away and the origin of mankind's only received signal from an alien race, a black hole with a mysterious artificial companion and the supposed home planet of a galaxy-wide surveillance system. However, their true mission lies at the heart of the galaxy, the supposed origin of the Omega Clouds, mysterious clouds of energy that travel through space, attacking and destroying any structure with right angles, at regular 8,000-year cycles. As they near their final objective, it becomes clear that the true purpose of the clouds is beyond anything they could have possibly imagined.

== Reception ==
Kirkus Reviews describes the book as "Not peak McDevitt — slow to develop and not especially surprising — but workmanlike and brimming with the author's trademark low-key charms."
