= Gregory Wright (astrophysicist) =

American astrophysicist

Gregory W. Wright is an astrophysicist and independent consultant with Antiope Associates. On September 2, 2004, an article co-authored by Christopher Rose and Wright, titled Inscribed matter as an energy-efficient means of communication with an extraterrestrial civilization, appeared on the cover of Nature with the headline "Dear ET...".

The article argued that wireless communication is an inefficient means for potential communication over interstellar distances owing to both the unavoidable reduction of signal strength as distance squared and that information can be densely encoded (inscribed) in matter. The article also suggested that information-bearing physical artifacts might be a more likely first form of contact with an extraterrestrial civilization than radio signals. the publication, Rose and Wright's idea was featured on the BBC World Service and twice on National Public Radio.
