= Jack McDevitt =

American science fiction author

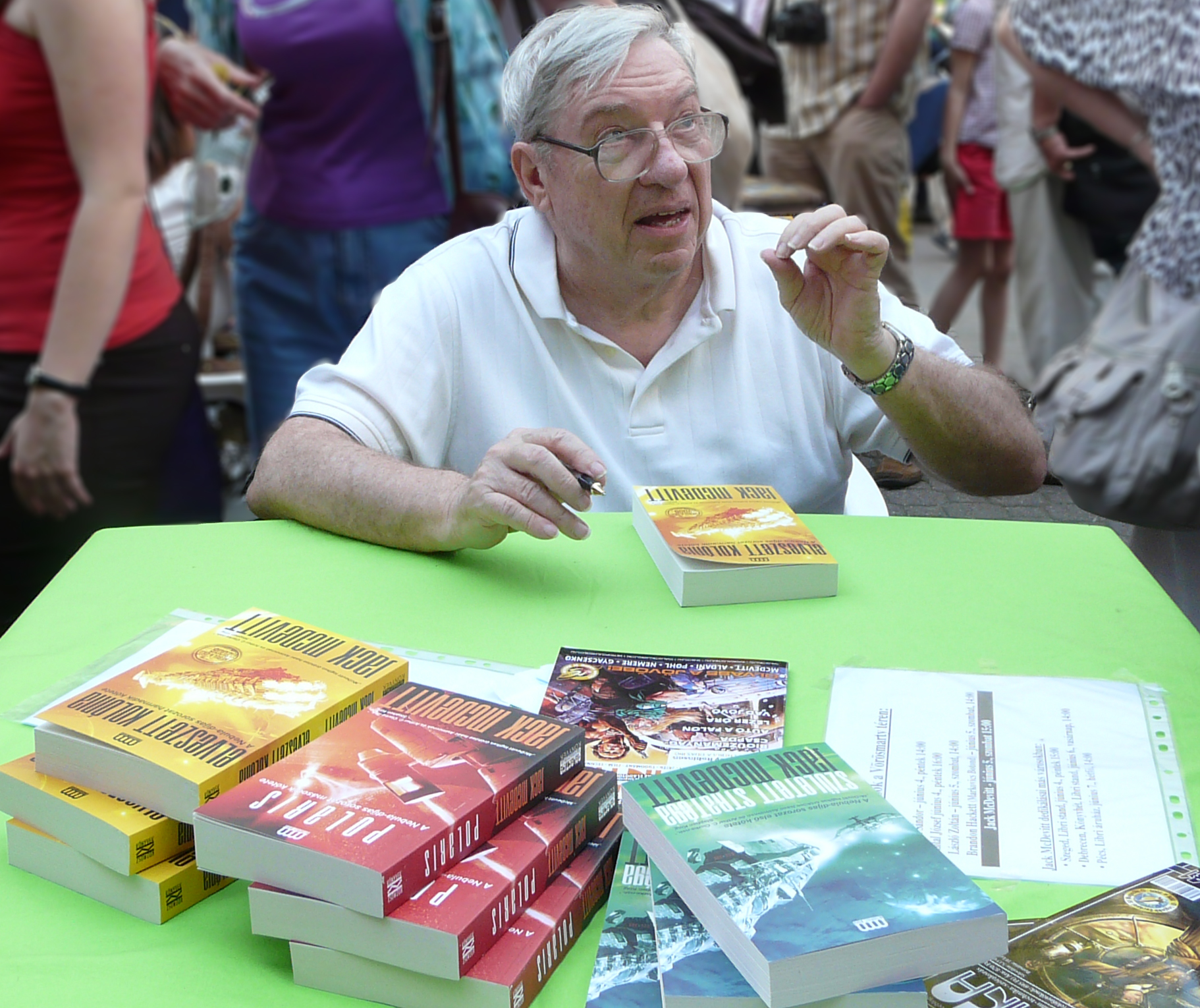
- McDevitt at the Festive Bookweek in Budapest, 2010
- Born: April 14, 1935 (age 91)
- Education: La Salle University
- Occupations: Novelist, short story writer
- Writing career
- Period: 1981–present
- Genre: Science fiction
- Website: jackmcdevitt.com

Jack McDevitt (born April 14, 1935) is an American science fiction author whose novels frequently deal with attempts to make contact with alien races, and with archaeology or xenoarchaeology. Most of his books concern either galactic relic hunters Alex Benedict and Chase Kolpath or superluminal space pilot Priscilla "Hutch" Hutchins. McDevitt has received numerous nominations for Hugo, Nebula, and John W. Campbell awards. Seeker won the 2006 Nebula Award for Best Novel.

McDevitt's first story published was "The Emerson Effect" in The Twilight Zone Magazine in 1981.

== Biography ==
McDevitt attended La Salle University, where a short story of his won the annual Freshman Short Story Contest and was published in the school's literary magazine, Four Quarters. As McDevitt explained in an interview:

I was on my way. Then I read David Copperfield and realized I could never write at that level, and therefore I should find something else to do. I joined the Navy, drove a cab, became an English teacher, took a customs inspector's job on the northern border, and didn't write another word for a quarter-century.

McDevitt received a master's degree in literature from Wesleyan University in 1971. He resumed writing when his wife, Maureen, encouraged him to try it in 1980. As of 2007, McDevitt lives near Brunswick, Georgia. In 2005, he donated his archive to the department of Rare Books and Special Collections at Northern Illinois University. The novel Seeker won the 2006 Nebula Award for Best Novel, given by the Science Fiction and Fantasy Writers of America. He has been nominated for the Nebula Award sixteen times; his only win was for Seeker.

== Themes ==
McDevitt has several story series, including one with the protagonist Alex Benedict. Another is his Academy series, including the novel The Engines of God (1994), which introduces the idea of a universe that was once teeming with intelligent life, but contains only their abandoned artifacts by the time humans arrive. The main character of The Engines of God, pilot Priscilla Hutchins, has since appeared in seven more books, Deepsix (2001), Chindi (2002), Omega (2003), Odyssey (2006), Cauldron (2007), StarHawk (2013), and The Long Sunset (2018). The mystery concerning the destructive "Omega Clouds" (introduced in The Engines of God) is unresolved until Omega.

McDevitt's novels frequently raise questions which he does not attempt to answer. He prefers to leave ambiguities to puzzle and intrigue his readers: "Some things are best left to the reader's very able imagination." The SF Site's Steven H Silver has written about this:

McDevitt has a (probably unintentional) tendency to give the impression that his novels will go in one direction and then take them in a different direction. Or possibly his background is so well thought out, that throw away lines, or subplots, or minor characters, have enough information behind them to make the reader want to see their story as much as the main plot of the book. While slightly annoying, this is, I've decided, a strength of McDevitt's writing since it shows the depth of his created worlds.

== Bibliography ==
=== Novels miscellaneous ===
- The Hercules Text (1986), a revised version was also published as part of the collection Hello Out There.
- Eternity Road (1998)
- Moonfall (1998)
- Infinity Beach (2000), UK title Slow Lightning
- Time Travelers Never Die (2009)
- The Cassandra Project (2012) with Mike Resnick

==== Academy Series - Priscilla "Hutch" Hutchins ====
- StarHawk (2013), prequel ISBN 0-425-26085-2
- The Engines of God (1994), book 1 ISBN 0-441-00077-0
- Deepsix (2001), book 2 ISBN 0-06-105124-1
- Chindi (2002), book 3 ISBN 0-441-00938-7
- Omega (2003), book 4 ISBN 0-441-01046-6
- Odyssey (2006), book 5 ISBN 0-441-01433-X
- Cauldron (2007), book 6 ISBN 0-441-01525-5
- The Long Sunset (2018), book 7 ISBN 1-481-49793-6

The short stories "Melville on Iapetus" (1983), "Promises To Keep" (1984), "Oculus" (2002), "The Big Downtown" (2005), "Kaminsky At War" (2006), "Maiden Voyage" (2012), "Waiting at the Altar" (2012), and "The Cat's Pajamas" (2012) are also set in the Academy universe.

==== Alex Benedict ====
- A Talent for War (1989), also published as part of the collection Hello Out There.
- Polaris (2004) ISBN 0-441-01202-7
- Seeker (2005), winner of Nebula Award for Best Novel, ISBN 0-441-01329-5
- The Devil's Eye (2008) ISBN 0-441-01635-9
- Echo (2010) ISBN 0-441-01924-2
- Firebird (November 1, 2011) ISBN 0-441-02073-9
- Coming Home. New York: Ace. 2014.
- Octavia Gone (May 7, 2019) ISBN 0-481-49797-8
- Village in the Sky (Gallery Publishing Group/Saga Press, January 31, 2023) ISBN 978-1-66800-429-6

The short stories "In the Tower" (1987) and "A Voice in the Night" (2013) are also set in the Alex Benedict universe.

==== Ancient Shores ====
- Ancient Shores (1996)
- Thunderbird (2015)
- Doorway to the Stars (2024) (Known to be included as a coda to many later ebook editions of Thunderbird, including Kindle and Kobo)

=== Short fiction ===
==== Collections ====
- Standard Candles (Tachyon Publications, 1996)
- Hello Out There (Meisha Merlin, 2000), omnibus edition of A Talent for War and a revised The Hercules Text
- Ships in the Night (AAB, 2005)
- Outbound (ISFiC Press, 2006) ISBN 0-9759156-4-9
- Cryptic: The Best Short Fiction of Jack McDevitt (Subterranean Press, February 2009) ISBN 978-1-59606-195-8
- A Voice in the Night (Subterranean Press, August 2018) ISBN 978-1-59606-880-3
- Return to Glory (Subterranean Press, October 2022)

== Awards and nominations ==
- Nebula Best Short Story nominee (1983) : Cryptic
- Philip K. Dick Award (special citation) (1986) : The Hercules Text
- Nebula Best Short Story nominee (1988) : "The Fort Moxie Branch"
- Hugo Best Short Story nominee (1989) : "The Fort Moxie Branch"
- International UPC Science Fiction Award winner (1993) : "Ships in the Night" (first English language winner)
- Nebula Best Novella nominee (1996) : "Time Travelers Never Die"
- Arthur C. Clarke Best Novel nominee (1997) : Engines of God
- Hugo Best Novella nominee (1997) : "Time Travelers Never Die"
- Nebula Best Novel nominee (1997) : Ancient Shores
- Nebula Best Novel nominee (1998) : Moonfall
- Nebula Best Novelette nominee (1999) : "Good Intentions" (co-writer Stanley Schmidt)
- Nebula Best Novel nominee (2000) : Infinity Beach
- John W. Campbell Memorial Award for Best Novel nominee (2001) : Infinity Beach
- John W. Campbell Memorial Award for Best Novel nominee (2002) : Deepsix
- Nebula Best Short Story nominee (2002) : "Nothing Ever Happens in Rock City"
- Nebula Best Novel nominee (2003) : Chindi
- Campbell Award winner (2004) : Omega
- Nebula Best Novel nominee (2004) : Omega
- Nebula Best Novel nominee (2005) : Polaris
- Nebula Best Novel winner (2006) : Seeker
- John W. Campbell Memorial Award for Best Novel nominee (2006) : Seeker
- John W. Campbell Memorial Award for Best Novel nominee (2007) : Odyssey
- Nebula Best Novel nominee (2007) : Odyssey
- Nebula Best Novel nominee (2008) : Cauldron
- Nebula Best Novel nominee (2010) : Echo
- Nebula Best Novel nominee (2011) : Firebird
- Nebula Best Novel nominee (2014) : Coming Home
- Robert A. Heinlein Award winner (2015)
