= M. K. Hobson =

American novelist

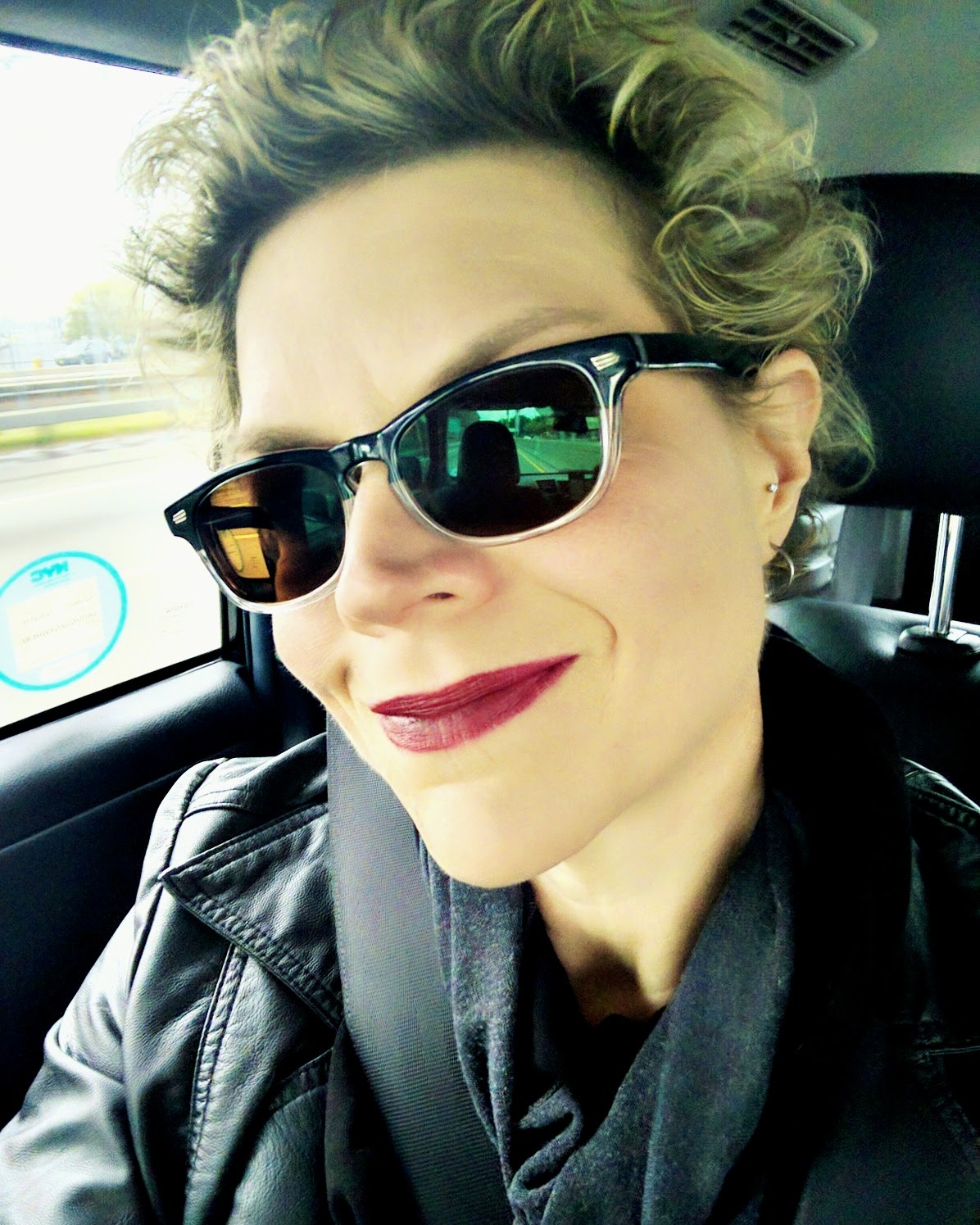
- M.K. Hobson, October 2016
- Born: January 21, 1969 (age 57); Riverside, California, U.S.
- Occupation: Writer
- Writing career
- Period: 1991–present
- Genres: speculative fiction magical realism historical fantasy fantasy
- Subjects: american history, economic fantasy, anarchism, historical fantasy, alternate history
- Movement: bustlepunk
- Website: www.demimonde.com

M. K. Hobson (born January 21, 1969; birth name: Mary Catherine Koroloff) is an American speculative fiction and fantasy writer. In 2003 she was a Pushcart Prize nominee, and her debut novel The Native Star was nominated for the 2010 Nebula Award.

== Biography ==
Mary Catherine Koroloff was born in Riverside, California and grew up in Portland, Oregon. She studied English ad film at the University of Oregon. In 1997 she married Daniel Hobson and they have a daughter Nora. As of 2010, she lived in Oregon City, Oregon.

== Work ==
Hobson published some short stories in minor magazines under her birth name. Her first professional short fiction under the name M.K. Hobson was "Daughter of the Monkey God" (Sci Fiction, 2003). As of 2010, she published over 30 stories. Her fiction has appeared in Sci Fiction, the Magazine of Fantasy and Science Fiction, Realms of Fantasy, Strange Horizons, and ChiZine. Her work has also appeared in anthologies such as Polyphony 5 and Polyphony 6 and Medicine Show. Hobson's story "The Hand of the Devil on a String" appeared on the 2008 Best American Fantasy recommended reading list, and her other work has received Honorable Mentions in "Year’s Best Fantasy and Horror" and "Year’s Best Science Fiction."

She is the author of the Veneficas Americana historical fantasy series. The first novel in the series, The Native Star, was published by Bantam Spectra on August 31, 2010. The sequel, The Hidden Goddess, followed on April 26, 2011. The third novel, The Warlock's Curse, begins a new duology and follows characters from a new generation. Hobson has described the style of the first two novels as "Bustlepunk."

She is also a co-host of the fantasy podcast PodCastle, a sister podcast of Escape Pod. As of 2010, she was co-editor—with author Douglas Lain—of the surrealist/anarchist 'zine Diet Soap.

== Bibliography ==
=== Novels ===
- The Native Star (August 31, 2010) Bantam Spectra (ISBN 978-0553592658)
- The Hidden Goddess (April 26, 2011) Bantam Spectra. (ISBN 978-0553592665)
- The Warlock's Curse (October 31, 2012) Demimonde. (ISBN 978-1938860003)

=== Short stories ===
Some Hobson's short stories are available online, including:

- The Hotel Astarte, Realms of Fantasy, June 2007.
- Severance Pay, Strange Horizons, September 2005.
- Domovoi, The Magazine of Fantasy and Science Fiction, April 2005
- Hell Notes, Sci Fiction, February 2005
- Ice Cream, Vestal Review, October 2003
- The Principessa of Montenegro, flashquake, Fall 2003
