= The Hercules Text =

1986 novel by Jack McDevitt

- First edition
- Author: Jack McDevitt
- Cover artist: Earl Keleny
- Language: English
- Genre: Science fiction
- Publisher: Ace Books
- Publication date: November 1986
- Publication place: United States
- Media type: Print (Paperback)
- ISBN: 0-441-37367-4
- OCLC: 15476626

The Hercules Text is a 1986 science fiction novel by American writer Jack McDevitt. It tells the story of a message of intelligent extraterrestrial origin received by SETI scientists. The Hercules Text was nominated for the Philip K. Dick Award in 1986.

Science fiction author Michael Swanwick said, in an overview of McDevitt's work, "Jack's first novel, The Hercules Text, appeared in 1986 as an Ace Special, putting him in the august company of such luminaries as William Gibson, Kim Stanley Robinson, and Lucius Shepard. It was a good book."

== Plot summary ==
The story emphasizes the various characters' reactions to the event, according to their specific scientific backgrounds. Examples include a priest's speculations on the implications for religion, a psychologist's theorizing about the aliens' psyches, the scientists' consideration of the implications of the new knowledge for their own specialties, and the president's concern for the implications for national defense.

The novel is set in an ongoing Cold War scenario. Unlike typical first contact stories, there is no dialogue between the senders of the message and mankind, as the received radio signals have traveled through space for one and a half million years.

=== The extraterrestrial message ===
The message is received with a large radio telescope, the fictional Hercules Array, which was built on the far side of the Moon. It is later discovered that the message was sent with an artificial pulsar built by the alien race. This pulsar with the name Althea has been known by the scientists for years. It was believed to be a normal pulsar. However, what made it special was its almost perfectly regular interval between the observed pulses.

One day, some of the pulses suddenly fail to appear. This incident draws more attention to this particular pulsar, as the newly discovered gaps show a remarkable pattern.

The first gap consists of one missing pulse, the second of two missing pulses and the third gap consists of four missing pulses. The following gaps also consist of numbers representing powers of 2 (2, 4, 8, 16, 32, 64, 128, ...). The transmission of these numbers goes on for a couple of days until the pulsar falls completely silent.

The silence lasts for several weeks, until it breaks again. This time, not just a simple sequence of numbers is received by the Hercules Array. Now, a very large and complex amount of binary data is sent from somewhere close to Althea. Scientists are able to decipher this data. It consists of several mathematical and physical formulae and simple graphical information. Later, more complex information is found, e.g., parts of the sender's DNA, schematics for very advanced technology, philosophical texts or poems.

== Publication history ==
The Hercules Text has been rewritten by Jack McDevitt, before being re-published in the year 2000 as part of the two-novel-book Hello Out There (ISBN 1-892-06523-1). The story received some changes, taking into account the end of the Cold War and some technical developments such as the Hubble Space Telescope and the Internet.

== See also ==
- Contact
- Communication with Extraterrestrial Intelligence
