= Odyssey (novel) =

2006 novel by Jack McDevitt

- First edition cover (publ. Ace Books); Cover art by Larry Price
- Author: Jack McDevitt
- Genre: Science fiction
- Set in: 23rd century
- Publisher: Ace Books
- Publication date: November 7, 2006
- ISBN: 0-441-01433-X

Odyssey is a 2006 science fiction novel by American writer Jack McDevitt. It is set in the 23rd century and "explores the immorality of big business and the short-sightedness of the American government in minimizing support for space travel."

Odyssey was nominated for a 2007 Nebula Award.

== Reception ==
Carl Hays reviewing in Booklist said, "McDevitt's energetic character-driver prose serves double duty by exploring Earth's future political climate and forecasting the potential dangers awaiting humanity among the stars". Kirkus Reviews was slightly more critical calling it "a low-key, reasonably surprising and involving tale, although not among McDevitt's best." Jackie Cassada, reviewing for Library Journal, wrote, "the author [...] succeeds in visualizing a believable future of space exploration as well as believable personalities whose lives and loves put a human face on scientific speculation."

In 2007, Odyssey was nominated for both the Nebula and John W. Campbell Memorial Awards.
