= Evergreen Cemetery (New Haven, Connecticut) =

Coordinates: 41.29939°N 72.94962°W

- Interactive map of Evergreen Cemetery

Details
- Established: 1848
- Location: New Haven, Connecticut
- Country: United States
- Size: 85 acres (34 ha)
- No. of graves: 85,000
- Website: www.evergreencem.org
- Find a Grave: Evergreen Cemetery

Evergreen Cemetery is located in the West River neighborhood of New Haven, Connecticut. It was founded by some of New Haven's most prominent citizens in 1848. Evergreen Cemetery is a non-sectarian, non-profit organization that is managed by the association's board of trustees.

== Notable burials ==
- Hobart B. Bigelow, governor of Connecticut (1881–1883)
- Edward Bouchet, first PhD recipient of African descent in the United States
- Chauncey B. Brewster, Episcopal clergyman (Bishop of Connecticut, 1899−1928)
- Wilbur L. Cross, governor of Connecticut (1931–1939) and professor of English at Yale University
- Edwin S. Greeley, Civil War general
- John Haberle (1856–1933), trompe-l'œil painter
- Bronisław Malinowski, social anthropologist
- William Chester Minor, lexicographer and key contributor to the creation of the Oxford English Dictionary
- John Addison Porter, chemistry professor at Yale University.
- John Addison Porter, journalist, and first Secretary to the President
- Ed Somerville, baseball player
- Ilya Tolstoy, writer and son of Leo Tolstoy
- Oliver Winchester, founder of the Winchester repeating rifle company
- Sarah Winchester, wife of William Wirt Winchester and builder of the Winchester Mystery House in San Jose, California
- George Weiss, Hall of Fame Major League Baseball executive
- Teresa Wright, Academy Award-winning actress; remains donated to Yale School of Medicine, buried in a small mass grave in Section 14
- One Commonwealth War Graves Commission burial, a Royal Flying Corps cadet of World War I.
