= Wanzer (surname) =

Wanzer is a surname.

== Notable people ==
- Arisce Wanzer, American actress and model
- Bobby Wanzer (1921–2016), American basketball player
- Cerina Wanzer (1977–2026), American dentist and public figure
- Lucy Maria Field Wanzer (1841–1930), American doctor
