= Euthanasia Sherman Meade =

American woman physician (1837–1895)

- Born: September 8, 1837; New York, US
- Died: November 1, 1895 (aged 58); San Francisco, California, US
- Education: Women's Medical College of Pennsylvania, 1869
- Occupation: Medical doctor
- Title: Doctor of Medicine
- Relatives: William Tecumseh Sherman, uncle

Signature
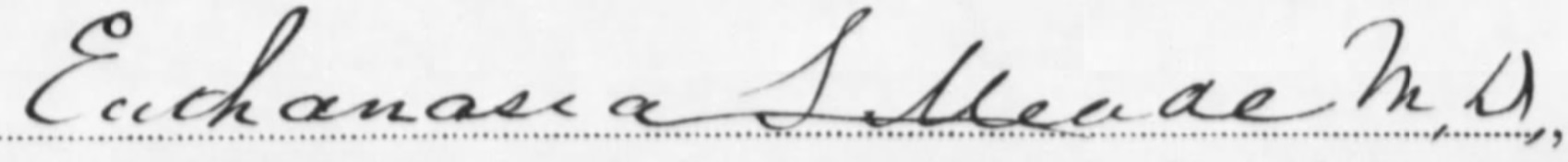

Euthanasia Sherman Meade (September 8, 1837 – November 1, 1895) was a pioneer woman physician of the Pacific Coast. Meade was the first president of The Woman's Medical Club of California.

== Early life ==
Euthanasia Sherman was born on September 8, 1837, in New York. She was the niece of General William Tecumseh Sherman. When she was 17 years old, she married a man her mother chose and shortly after moved to California. After the death of her only child in its birth, she turned to obstetrics, and later medicine. She returned to the East Coast and worked in hospitals during the American Civil War. In 1869, she graduated from the Woman's Medical College of Pennsylvania.

== Career ==
When she returned to California, Meade opened a medical practice on Mission Street in San Francisco. She was the first regular woman physician to establish herself in California. However, due to the times, she was met with little recognition in the medical profession. She developed asthma and eventually moved to San José where she practiced for 25 years. In 1876, Meade and four other women physicians were admitted to the State Medical Society. Meade had been the first woman physician in San José, having practiced medicine there since 1869.

After Sarah Winchester, widow of William Wirt Winchester who owned the Winchester Repeating Arms Company, moved to California and purchased a property in the Santa Clara Valley, Meade became Winchester's personal physician.

Meade also trained women in the medical career, including Mary Bennett Ritter, who wrote of her experiences with Sherman in her autobiography, More than Gold In California (1933). Of Meade, Ritter wrote, "The spirit of the profession at its best was imbued in me by this indomitable, high-minded woman."

== Death ==
Meade died November 1, 1895 due to a cerebral embolus from an endocarditis. She was cremated and her ashes placed at Cypress Lawn Cemetery. Of her death, Ritter wrote, "Many of the poor and the rich of San Jose felt that they had lost their best friend when Dr. Euthanasia Sherman Meade died."
