= Pacific Dispensary for Women and Children =

Former women's and children's hospital in San Francisco, California

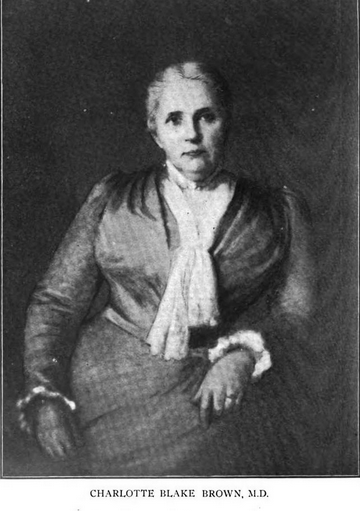
A portrait of Charlotte Blake Brown, from a 1904 publication.

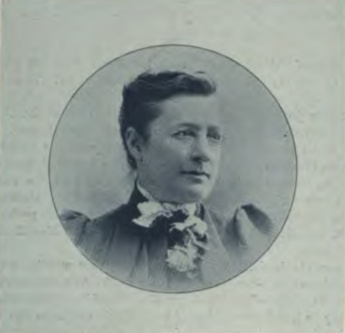
Dr. Lucy Maria Field Wanzer

Pacific Dispensary for Women and Children, initially known as Children's Hospital and then The Hospital for Children and Training School for Nurses, was a women's and children's hospital founded in 1875 in San Francisco, California. In 1877, it was renamed Children's Hospital. Children's Hospital merged with Presbyterian Hospital in 1991, and within two years, a large joint physician group was established. It was subsequently acquired by California Pacific Medical Center.

== History ==
=== 19th century ===
The hospital was established by Drs. Charlotte Blake Brown, Sara E. Brown, and Martha E. Bucknell, as the "Pacific Dispensary for Women and Children" in 1875 at 520 Taylor Street, San Francisco, by a group of eleven philanthropic women including Mrs. D. J. Staples, president; Mrs. A. L. Stone and Elkan Cohen, vice-presidents; Mrs. Oliver W. Easton, treasurer; and Mrs. John Hooper, Mrs. C. A. Wright, Mrs. Irving M. Scott, Mrs. Joseph Healy, Mrs. E. W. Phillips, Mrs. W. T. Wallace, Mrs. Henry Graves, Mrs. Thomas Flint, directors. Healthcare was free, patients charged for medicine. It became a hospital in 1878. The hospital was reincorporated in 1885 as "The Hospital for Children and Training School for Nurses," and was located at 3700 California Street. The staff of those early days contained the names of Mrs. M. E. Bucknell, M. D., Mrs. Charlotte Blake Brown, M. D., and Mrs. Sara E. Brown, M. D. From this small beginning, in 1875, the hospital grew to become a general hospital. It was one of the largest hospitals devoted entirely to women and children patients, with a governing board of women, and an administration and staff largely of women. The school of nursing was the pioneer organization of this class in California.

The foundation of the Children's Hospital was made by women physicians. Dr. Martha Bucknall and Dr. Charlotte Blake Brown in 1875 called on 70 women in San Francisco to secure a board of directors of eight women. Women's boards were then a new idea. No YWCA existed, no Associated Charities, no Fruit and Flower Mission. Social service was confined to the boards managing orphanages. This first organization was incorporated as the Pacific Dispensary for Women and Children, and was one of a few hospitals, with New York Infirmary for Women and Children, run by and for women physicians across the United States.

The purposes of the institution were defined as: "To provide for women the medical aid of competent women physicians and to assist in educating women for nurses and in the practice of medicine and kindred professions." Two examples of the financial straits of the institution during the first ten years of its existence are described here. Dr. Ellen Sargent, who was graduating from the University Medical School and had become interested in the hospital as a medical student, gave up her commencement black silk dress and deposited the money with the hospital to pay the rent to keep it open for another month. At another time of crisis, Dr. Lucy Maria Field Wanzer and Dr. Brown took out their life memberships to avert the same catastrophe. Jessie Astredo Smith was the first graduate. The second class graduated four nurses. In 1889, the attending physicians were Miss Wanzer, Charlotte Blake Browne, and Kate Post-Van Order.

In 1880, the dispensary opened its Training School for Nurses.

In 1885, the dispensary reincorporated as The Hospital for Children and Training School for Nurses.

The organization relocated five times before moving to a location on California Street in 1887.

In 1991, it became a part of Sutter Health.

=== 20th century ===
In 1906, the San Francisco earthquake and fire damaged the main hospital structure beyond repair.

In 1911, new main building was completed.

In 1991, Children's Hospital of San Francisco merged with Pacific Presbyterian Medical Center forming California Pacific Medical Center.

== Nurse Training School ==
Up to 1918, 475 nurses graduated from the hospital's nurse Training School. Ethel Sherman, at the Students' Infirmary of the University of California, was a path blazer in college nursing and health work among college students. Eleanor Stockton, at the San Francisco Board of Health, developed her work as a pioneer. Edna Shuey, of the Berkeley Dispensary, is a contributor to the public health nursing course at the University of California, and the public health nursing group of Hawaiian girls working in tuberculosis, leprosy, and general public health work in the Islands. Miss Boye, as executive of the Training School, is making a steady contribution to the education of nurses.

== Interns ==
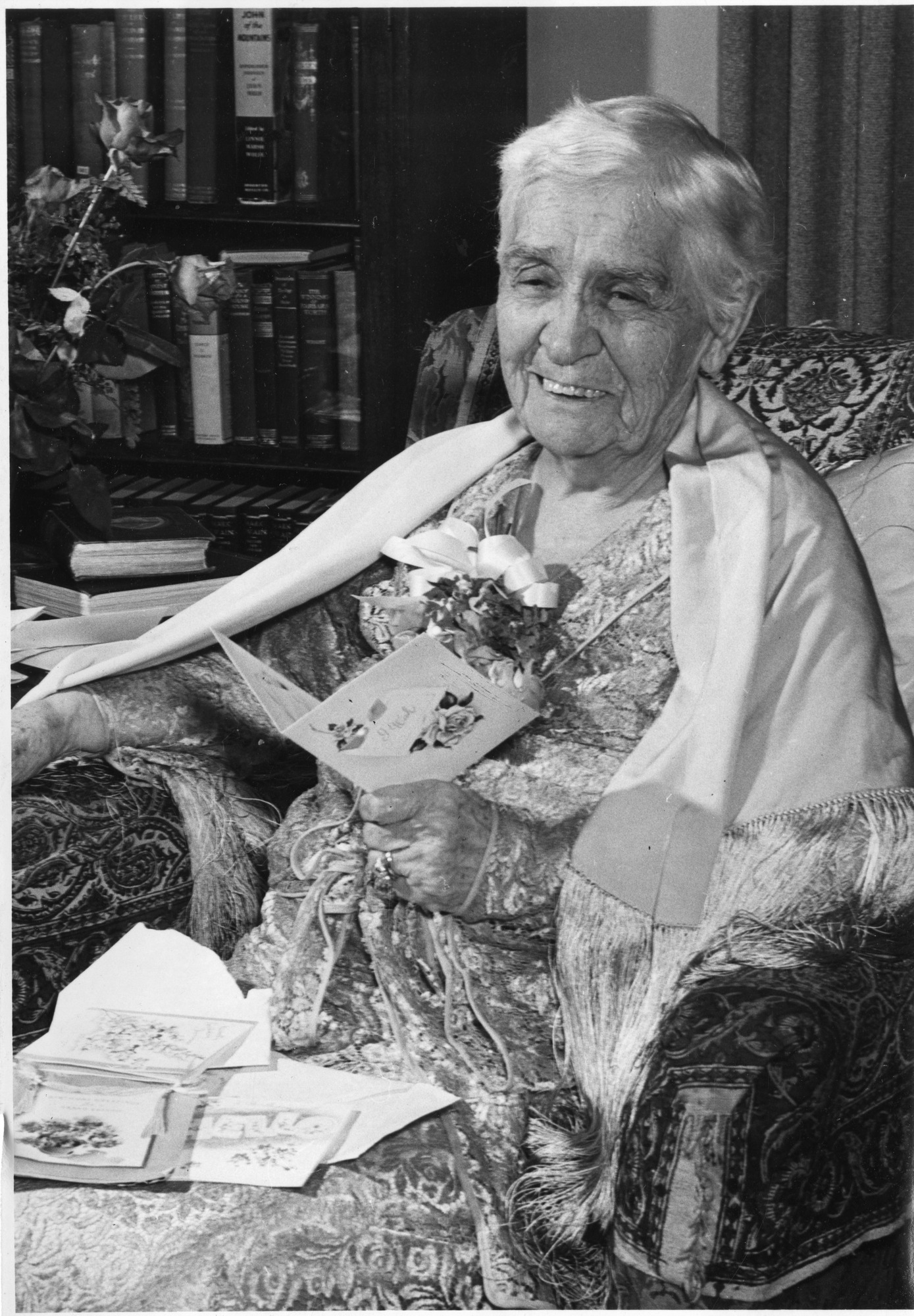
Dr. Mary Ritter

The other group of pupils was the intern group. During the first period, from 1875 to 1885, the interns were called residents, several of them serving two years or more at the hospital, in general practice. Institution work claimed Dr. Fletcher, and Mary Bennett Ritter made the pioneer contribution in the teaching of hygiene to the University Women Students at Berkeley. From 1885 to 1915, during the development of the hospital as a permanent institution, interns sought the training from the local medical schools of Stanford and University of California, University of Minnesota, Rush, Michigan, the P. and S. in Chicago, the Woman's Medical in Philadelphia, and Johns Hopkins.

They settled from New Bedford to India, five were missionary physicians; Dr. Margaret Smythe became connected with the State Hospital at Stockton, and later was first assistant and in charge of the women's department of over 1,000 patients. She was a general surgeon and able executive. In public health, Dr. Anna E. Rude was the Director of the Child Hygiene Division of the Children's Bureau in Washington. Dr. Ethel Watters was Director of the Bureau of Child Hygiene of the California State Board of Health. Dr. Viola Russell was acting assistant surgeon in United States Public Health Service. Dr. Appel was at the head of the Vocational and Work Certificate Department of the Chicago Board of Education, and made an extensive contribution to the health improvement of the working child. In anesthetics, Dr. Mary Botsford educated younger women in this specialty. In tuberculosis, Dr. Martha Patrick of Los Angeles, worked under the Board of Health. In pathology, Dr. Agnes Walker held both city and State positions, and Dr. Macrae, after serving the hospital for many years as Chief of Laboratory, was in charge of the Laboratories at the San Francisco Hospital. Dr. Mary Cain served as executive of the San Francisco Tuberculosis Association. Dr. Myrl Morris joined the staff of the Children's Hospital, Dr. Dorothy Atkinson was in charge of the Health Centers of the San Francisco Board of Health, Dr. Nell Ford became resident physician at Mills College and was in charge of 12 health centers in the Oakland public schools.

== Financials ==
The hospital was supported from endowment, patients' board, laboratory, surgical, and X-ray service. The gap between funds earned interest from endowment, and expenses was bridged by the activity of the managers —soliciting gifts and donations and by the Auxiliary in entertaining the public yearly at the Mardi Gras Ball.

As a charity, the Children's Hospital held a strong appeal for the public, and was supported entirely by contributions and income from paying patients. Supported and endowed beds were particularly needed for maternity patients and women ill of medical diseases. The assets of the hospital were substantial in 1922, and there were no liabilities. Most of the assets were accumulated by gifts from California friends. A large part of the hospital's service to the sick, was for children unable to pay. In 1921, over $80,000.00 of such work was given.

In 1901 drugs were furnished at US$0.25 per prescription if patients could pay. The hospital was supported by income from prescriptions and occasional donations.

== Auxiliary ==
An auxiliary of young women connected with the work of the Children's Hospital was a source of aid. For instance, they donated an X-Ray equipment, and the purchase of the Nurses' Home from the University of California Hospital was one of their permanent accomplishments. This work was established as a memorial to the auxiliary member, Mrs. George McNear. Members of the auxiliary board included: Mrs. Henry Kiersted, Mrs. Henry Dutton, Mrs. George Cameron, Mrs. Latham McMullin, Mrs. Horace Hill, Mrs. S. H. Boardman, Mrs. Norris K. Davis, Mrs. Walter Martin, Mrs. Charles T. Crocker, Mrs. H. W. Poett, Mrs. Augustus Taylor, Mrs. William H. Taylor, Jr., Mrs. Laurence I. Scott, Mrs. Julian Thorne, Miss Emily Carolan, Miss Marion Zeile, Mrs. J. Cheever Cowdin, Miss Louise Boyd, and Mrs. H. H. Scott.

== Proposed merger of 1915 ==
In their fight against the use of the Children's Hospital as an adjunct of the medical department of the University of California, San Francisco, a letter of protest was sent to the hospital trustees by Dr. Margaret Mahoney, the secretary, and a committee of the Society for the Advancement of Women in Medicine and Surgery. The letter said, in part: "We appeal to you to carry out the letter and the spirit of your trust, and protect the interests of the sick children of San Francisco and of women physicians. There is no provision in the articles of incorporation by which the Children's Hospital is to provide sick children as teaching material for a medical school. The proposed change offers nothing for the benefit of sick children. It simply offers them as helpless sacrifices to be used as teaching material."

== Reorganization of 1920 ==
In September, 1920, the staff was re-organized with four women on surgery, including the general surgery of women and children and no men; two women on obstetrics and no men; three women on pediatrics and no men; three women in medicine and no men; one woman on the eye and ear service, the senior on the service and one man; and four women in anesthetics. There were three men and no women in the orthopedic service, and no women physicians in the department of pathology; one man and one woman on contagious service. The light affiliation which resulted with the University instead of absorption, defined the purposes of the Hospital clearly; but for the first five years the affiliation has been a negative rather than a positive influence in the hospital. As one of the University of California medical men expressed it, "he could not see that the affiliation had done any harm."

== Sources ==
- Coolidge, Mary Roberts; Kimball, Cora Bell; Cochran, George Thomas (1901). A Directory of the Charitable and Benevolent Institutions of San Francisco. municipal authority, Phillips, Smyth & Van Orden, printers.
- Gibbons, Henry; Gibbons, Henry Jr. (1883). Pacific Medical and Surgical Journal and Western Lancet (Public domain ed.).
- Pacific Medical Journal (1915). Pacific Medical Journal (Public domain ed.).
