= The Way (novel series) =

Trilogy of science fiction novels and one short story by Greg Bear

The Way series
- Cover of the first book in the series, Eon
- Eon (1985); Eternity (1988); Legacy (1994)
- Author: Greg Bear
- Country: United States
- Language: English
- Genre: Science fiction
- Published: 1985–1999
- Media type: Print (hardcover and paperback), e-book
- No. of books: 3

The Way series is a trilogy of science fiction novels and one short story by American author Greg Bear published from 1985 to 1999. The first novel was Eon (1985), followed by a sequel, Eternity and a prequel, Legacy. It also includes The Way of All Ghosts, a short story that falls between Legacy and Eon.

== Novels ==
=== Eon ===
Eon chronicles the appearance and discovery of the Thistledown, and its subsequent effect on humanity.

In the early 21st century, the United States and the USSR are on the verge of nuclear war. In that tense political climate, an asteroid appears out of near space after an unusual supernova and settles into an extremely elliptical orbit near Earth orbit. The two nations each try to claim this mysterious object, which appears to be a virtual duplicate of Juno. It is hollow and contains seven vast terraformed chambers. Two of the chambers contain cities long abandoned by human beings who seemed to come from Earth's future. The asteroid is called the Thistledown by its builders. A startling discovery is that it is bigger inside than outside. The seventh chamber appears to stretch into infinity.

The human inhabitants of the Thistledown come from an alternate timeline, approximately 1000 years in the future. In their timeline, human civilization was nearly destroyed by the "Death", a calamitous World War involving nuclear weapons. The Death occurred at approximately the same time as the appearance of the Thistledown in the present time. Its presence threatens to cause the Death to occur on the current timeline as well.

An expedition is sent down the seemingly infinite seventh chamber (The "Way", as it is known) where it encounters the descendants of humanity. The high technology of this civilization, known as the Hexamon, has control over genetic engineering, human augmentation, and matter itself. The Hexamon includes several alien species who have come to live with humanity's descendants. The Hexamon itself is at war with an alien race known as the Jarts from further down the corridor still.

In 2007, CGSociety organised a "CG Challenge" based upon Eon

=== Eternity ===
Jarts, politics, and technology make up the second book in the series: Eternity.

The Jart religion is based on the preservation of all data, which encompasses all life forms, past and present, and sending that data to the Jarts' future masters, their descendants.

=== Legacy ===
In the third book (a prequel, set in the time before Eon), Legacy, soldier Olmy ap Sennon is sent to spy on a group of dissidents who have used the spacetime tunnel of "the Way" (introduced in Eon) to colonize the alien world of Lamarckia, a planet with an ecosystem that learns from its changed environment in a way that resembles Lamarckian evolution. Its plants and animals turn out to actually be parts of continent-sized organisms.

=== "The Way of All Ghosts" ===
In the short story "The Way of All Ghosts" soldier Olmy ap Sennon is sent to close a lesion that formed out of a wayward gate into perfection. This story was published in 1999 in Far Horizons.

== Fictional history of the Thistledown ==
Within the universe of The Way, the Thistledown is an asteroid starship built by hollowing out Juno and fitting it with mass-driver (rail gun) engines and thermonuclear drives. Inside the asteroid, seven giant "Chambers" are built, of which two host cities for the inhabitants, while others host machinery and recreation areas. The asteroid is prepared 500 years in the future, as told in Bear's novel Eon, and is engaged on a multi-generational journey to Epsilon Eridani, around which a habitable planet is known to circle.

The journey is meant to take 60 years, as the ship can only maintain a velocity of 20% the speed of light. This limitation is removed after the technology of the Thistledown was improved to include inertial dampeners, allowing higher accelerations.

Inhabiting the Thistledown are the best and brightest of Earth, who are quite diverse both culturally and politically. The Thistledown's society includes one transcendent genius, Konrad Korzenowski, whose preference for living in the Thistledown as compared with an outer universe, causes him to experiment with closed-geodesic space time in the Seventh Chamber, 20 years into the Thistledown's voyage. The results of his experiments are shattering in the extreme: He creates a unique pocket universe: The Way.

== The Way ==
=== Origin ===
The eponymous Way is an extension of the 7th Chamber, and was formed in the novels using the machinery of the 6th Chamber. This machinery is a selective inertial damper, developed by engineers within the Thistledown with twofold purpose—to permit the Thistledown to accelerate to the limit of its engines (up to 99% the speed of light) and to selectively dampen inertia within the vessel, e.g., water within waterways, high velocity train systems. The inertial dampening machinery within the 6th Chamber is anchored to the structure of the Thistledown, equally spaced around the chamber at the vertices of a regular heptagon.

=== Creation ===
At the creation, and rejoining of the Way to the Thistledown, the character Konrad Korzenowski and his engineers designed and 'built' the Way out of the in-folded geodesics of the inertial dampening field of the 6th Chamber machinery. This is described in the books by first considering the inertial dampening field: Within the Thistledown, the field envelops the asteroid, effectively isolating it from the Einsteinian Metrical Frame, permitting relative inertia to be ignored. The Thistledown was, at the time of activation, isolated from its continuum, but only selectively. Its matter and energy anchored it to its continuum and relative time, but its geometry and quantum entanglement had been strained by the inertial dampener, thus making it susceptible to superspace distortions, and therefore it could be affected by them negatively.

Korzenowski, having been influenced by the earlier work of Vazquez on Earth, and in developing her work within the Thistledown, planned a radical extension of the inertial field of the 6th Chamber - effectively extending the field away to an infinite extent within the 7th Chamber. In order to do this effectively, he and his engineers modified a set of semi-sentient field calibration tools to build the first Clavicles. Unlike the field calibration tools from which they were descended, the Clavicles possessed the ability not only to manipulate the field, but extend it as an extension of the will of the operator. Already radical enough, Korzenowski and his team went further. By extending the field of the 6th Chamber from within the 7th Chamber of the Thistledown, they could then directly access what Vasquez had calculated within her own work—alternate world lines as non-gravity bent geodesics of superspace.

Korzenowski thus 'felt' superspace within the 7th Chamber, selecting the infinite selection of possible alternate pocket universes accessible by the Clavicle to form, as a sheer act of will, the Way from his designs and his vision. The resulting structure was constructed, not of matter, but of previously in-folded superspace vectors now infinitely extended. (in the manner of Schwarzschild folded geometry, or of an asymptotic curve.) The Way was thus opened.

The Way's geometry also gave rise to the Flaw - as superspace geometry of the field boundary was extended infinitely, so the folded geodesics of the field unfold in the geometric centre of the Way to form a singularity. This singularity, the Flaw, rests within the Way's plasma tube (which in turn is sustained by the Flaw). The Flaw 'produces' gravity by actively repulsing matter away from itself in an acceleration at the square of the distance away from itself. In addition, any object encircling the Flaw, and then exerting pressure against it, experiences this pressure as a translation force along the Flaw's length perpendicular to the direction of force. The motion thus induced is controllable by the angle at which an annular ring enclosure is pressed against the Flaw. The same spatial transform also can be used to turn tip turbines in order to generate electricity. The Flaw permits a violation of the First Law of Thermodynamics, therefore defining the Way as a perpetual motion machine of the First Order, making energy out of nothing.

=== Early history ===
The Way, as formed, was described by Bear as being in vacuum and did not consist of matter within its infinite length. Due to extremely slight ambiguity involved in its creation, the synchronicity between time within the Way, and within the Thistledown, was not exact. Thus, the Engineers spend two decades working to correct these faults using the Clavicles to manipulate the junction between Way and Thistledown. During this period, ambition led Korzenowksi to use the clavicle to open the first exploratory gate within the way, leading to the universe of the Jarts. Though the gate to Jart world was closed, the advanced Jarts nevertheless successfully managed to re-open, expand, occupy, and even master the workings of the Way. Korzenowski on returning had not taken into account the time dilation effects within the Way, and the Jarts had centuries within the way to access alternate universes, such as the one to the world of the Talsit. They established a trading empire, and were very hostile to the Way's human creators who re-entered their territories having stabilised the connection to the Thistledown.

=== The Jart Wars ===
The progressive Geshels and conservative Naderites (two fictional groups in the novels) who made their travels into the Way quickly met the Jarts. Conflict ensued in order to drive the Jarts out of the Way - this partly succeeded within the first century of Human expansion into the Way. Both sides fought each other through the use of remote slaved munitions carrier vehicles, of broadly similar design (a consequence of their shared environment). Human vehicles were 'crewed' by partial personalities held within memory systems. Jart machines had similar arrangements, though in at least one documented case, one of the war machines was crewed by a corporeal Jart duty expediter, subsequently captured.

Ultimately, the Jarts were driven back beyond 2 ex 9 ( 2x10^9 km, or 2 billion kilometres), a position they remained at until Journey Year 1174.

At the conclusion of the Jart Wars at about Journey Year 850, the Geshels and Naderites moved into the Way. The conflict had however resulted in casualties on both sides, and one of the most significant was that of the Engineer, Korzenowski, assassinated by Orthodox Naderites in the Thistledown. His personality was not completely lost, but no complete backups of the Engineer existed until the events of Journey Year 1175.

=== Early Human exploration ===
The opening of gates and use of field technology permitted the Geshels to cover the Way with soil and living plants, as well as fill it with air, for nearly a lightyear down from the Thistledown. This magnificent area remained as wilderness for much of the life of the Way. Soil, air and water were brought from worlds accessed from within the Way. Quickly, the gate openers discovered that the epoch and origin of the Thistledown within Earth's solar system defined where the gates opened to - almost without exception (and these exceptions included as a consequence of the infinities addressed through superspace geometries as defined by Patricia Vasquez) were alternative versions of Earth within other Universes. Thus commerce was possible with these universes. Covering the surface of the way and filling the way with air was rendered simple by opening gates in proximity to a planet not occupied by intelligence or excessive quantities of animals, and then sucking the air and soil from these worlds to cover the Way's bare surface.

Gates are capped with cupolas formed from Space-time itself. As distortions in space-time geometry, their nature can be calculated by 21st century instruments laid on their 'surfaces'. The constant Pi, in particular, is most strongly affected.

=== Axis City, and Eviction of the Naderites ===
With the opening (and re-opening of previously Jart controlled) gates, the human migrants gained access to remarkable technologies and abilities, and made possible habitation within the Way, and on the Flaw itself, in the newly created Axis Thoreau and Axis Euclid at 1.5 ex 7 (15 million km). They developed trading client-patron relations with the Frants of Timbl, and client-client relations with the Talsit. With development of memory technologies, City Memory was created, and humans not only became immortal, but also gained the ability to be reborn. Government changed, with the formation of the Hexamon and the governing Nexus.

Orthodox Naderites remained within the Thistledown for a century after the end of Jart Wars, but concerns over the safety of the Thistledown and the danger of interference with the Sixth Chamber machinery caused the Geshels to have the Naderites forcibly removed from Thistledown to prevent disaster. Violence erupted during the forced migration, and for acclimation of Naderites, forced occupation of Thistledown City (the Geshel enclave) for most Naderites took place for one year.

By Journey Year 950, the Thistledown was empty, and history proceeded gently until the cataclysmic events of Journey Year 1175.

=== Geometric Rhythms ===
The mathematical construction of the Way as written creates a rhythm, or order in which gate loci are located, a consequence of the propagation of World Lines along folded Geodesics. For every kilometer of the Way, the time period experienced outside the asteroid increases or decreases by a year. For every meter of the Way there is a minimum intersection with the world-lines of 100 universes. However, there are significant segments of the Way wherein there are a near-infinity of Universes containing alternate Earths.

The reason for the Geometry Stacks, as they are called, is described by the author as being a direct consequence of the origin of the Way within the Thistledown, and its development through extension of the inertial dampening field of the Sixth Chamber. Essentially, the Way is anchored to the space-time of the Thistledown—Juno, within the Solar System of Earth. If it were possible to construct a universe like the Way without quantum entanglement, the Geometry Stacks would most likely not exist, or if in existence, would not be tied to a quantum entanglement with a particular continuum. Since the Way and Thistledown are entangled, the existence of the Geometry Stacks is to be expected within mathematical theory first developed by Patricia Vasquez in 1989 with regard to folded spatial transforms expressed as a function of the superspace curvature of the Way.

There is a sharp consequence to the entanglement of the Way - Alternate Universes accessed by Gates, and to worlds such as that of the Frants (Timbl), Talsit and Jarts, must by definition share a certain amount of entanglement, even in a most fractional percentage. It is therefore fair to say that these worlds are in fact alternate universes and versions of Earth, though divergence and near-complete lack of similarity in fact make them very different indeed.

The most noteworthy aspect of the Geometry Stacks is their infinite profusion of alternate Earths, in far greater quantity in comparison with the commerce gates with partners, clients—and enemies. In the case of the world of the Talsit, more than one Gate at more than one location is possible, as the probability of the Talsit world is very well defined indeed. Therefore, it can be demonstrated with mathematical precision that Human beings impose a remarkable set of quantum stresses upon their home continuum, resulting in a near-infinity of timelines for their world—all equally real. Thus, the many-worlds quantum model is proved to be both real and accessible within the novels, a fantastic achievement.

Gate openers, by Journey Year 1174, prefer not to work within the Geometry Stacks, as these universes are considered not worth the effort of determination, given the extreme difficulty of tuning a gate in the very tight confines of Stacks, where Universes are often separated by sub-quantum distances.

The Way, inevitably, will intersect with itself, and with the cores of Stars. Remarkable events are derived from this fact. In addition, the Way encompasses all events within itself within its length.

== Awards ==
- Eon was nominated for an Arthur C. Clarke Award in 1987.
- Legacy was nominated for a Locus Award in 1996.
