= Brian Andrews =

Brian or Bryan Andrews may refer to:

- Brian Andrews (actor), American actor
- Brian Andrews (singer), American singer with band Day26
- Bryan Andrews (cricketer) (born 1945), New Zealand cricketer
- Brian Andrews (doctor) (born 1955), American neurosurgeon
- Bryan Andrews (filmmaker) (born 1975), American story artist and writer
- Bryan Andrews (singer), American country singer
