= Charlotte Blake Brown =

American physician

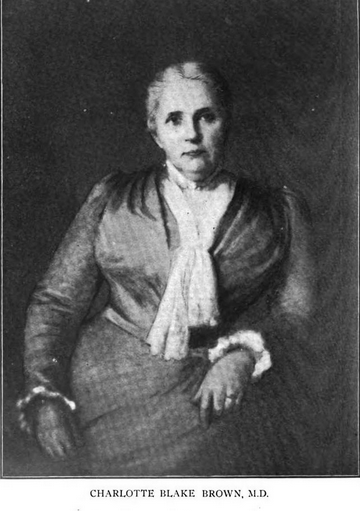
A 1904 portrait of Brown.

Charlotte Blake Brown (1846 – April 19, 1904) was an American physician. She was one of the first female doctors to practice on the West Coast of the United States and was a co-founder of the Pacific Dispensary for Women and Children, and San Francisco Hospital for Children and Training School for Nurses.

== Early life and education ==
Charlotte Amanda Blake was born in Philadelphia, in 1846. Both her parents were from Brewer, Maine, and Brown subsequently attended high school in Bangor, Maine while living with relatives.

After graduating from high school, she entered Elmira College in Elmira, New York, graduating in 1866. She married Henry Adams Brown, and in 1872 attended the Women's Medical College of Philadelphia, graduating with an MD in 1874.

== Career ==
In 1875, Brown moved to San Francisco, and founded the Pacific Dispensary for Women and Children with Dr. Martha Bucknell. A third female physician, Dr. Sara E. Brown, subsequently joined them, and the institution was reorganized as the San Francisco Hospital for Children in 1878.

Brown lived in California once before. Her father went to San Francisco at the height of the California Gold Rush in 1849, and the family joined him in 1851.

In 1854, they moved to Chile, where her father, a Presbyterian minister, ran a mission for Scottish miners until 1854, when they returned to Philadelphia.

Brown's first application to join the San Francisco Medical Society was rejected on account of her gender. In 1876, however, she was one of four women admitted into the California Medical Society, causing the San Francisco physicians to re-consider and grant her membership two years later.

In 1880, Brown and her colleagues organized within their hospital the first nurses' training school on the West Coast. Brown wrote 18 articles for medical journals in addition to carrying on a busy practice and raised three children, two of whom also became physicians.

== Death ==
Brown died in 1904, aged 58 years, in San Francisco.

== Legacy ==
Children's Hospital merged with another institution to become California Pacific Medical Center in 1991.
