= Eternity (novel) =

1988 novel by Greg Bear

- First edition cover
- Author: Greg Bear
- Cover artist: Ron Miller; design by Don Rackey
- Language: English
- Series: The Way
- Genre: Science fiction novel
- Publisher: Warner Books
- Publication date: October 3, 1988
- Publication place: United States
- Media type: Print (hardback & paperback)
- Pages: 367
- ISBN: 0-445-20547-4
- OCLC: 20664896
- Preceded by: Eon
- Followed by: Legacy

Eternity is a science fiction novel by American author Greg Bear published by Warner Books in 1988. It is the second book in his The Way series, dealing largely with the aftermath of the decision to split Axis City and abandon the Way in the preceding book, Eon.

== Plot summary ==
In Eon, Axis City split into two: a segment of Naderites and some Geshels took their portion of the city out of the Way and through Thistledown into orbit around the Earth; they spend the next thirty years aiding the surviving population of Earth to heal and rebuild from the devastating effects of the Death which strains their and the Hexamon government's resources. As time passes, sentiment grows to have Konrad Korzenowski reopen the Way. Firstly, to learn what has happened to the Geshels' long-sundered brethren (who took their portion of Axis City down the Way at relativistic near-light speed). And, secondly, to benefit from the commercial advantages of the Way (despite the risk that the Jarts will be waiting on the other side).

In a parallel Earth, known as Gaia, mathematician Patricia Vasquez (the primary protagonist of Eon), dies of old age; she never found her own Earth where the Death did not happen and her loved ones were still alive, but remained on the one she discovered (in which Alexander the Great did not die young and his empire did not fragment after his death). She passes her otherworldly artifacts of technology to her granddaughter, Rhita, who appears to have inherited her gifts. Rhita moves away from the academic institute the "Hypateion" (a reference to Hypatia) which Patricia founded and that world's version of Alexandria. Patricia's clavicle claims that a test gate has been opened onto this world of Gaia, and that it could be expanded further.

Ser Olmy is concerned by the prospects of the Way being re-opened with the attendant consequences, and by the revelation to him by an old friend that one of the deepest secrets of the Hexamon was a captured Jart whose body died in the process but whose mind was uploaded. Its mentality was alien and powerful enough that it took over or killed many of the researchers who attempted to connect to and study it, so it was hidden away deep in the Stone. As he studies the Jart, Olmy comes to believe that the Jart allowed itself to be captured and is a Trojan Horse. The Jart reveals tidbits about the Jart civilization: in essence, they are a hierarchical meta-civilization that ruthlessly modifies itself, attempting to absorb all useful intelligences and ways of thinking that it encounters, in the service of the Jarts' ultimate goal - to transmit all the data they can possibly gather to "descendant command". Olmy investigates further and discovers that descendant command is the Jart name for what they know as the "Final Mind" - a Teilhardian (or Tiplerian) conception of an ultimate intelligence which will be created at the end of the universe when all intelligences merge themselves into a single transcendent intellect which will effectively be a god. Olmy underestimates the Jart, and it begins to slowly take over his body and mind. Its original mission, assigned to it hundreds of years ago was to engage in sabotage and transmit its freshly acquired understanding of humanity back to present command, but the return of Pavel Mirsky changes everything. The Jart defers to Mirsky, describing him as 'coming from Descendant Command'.

Pavel Mirsky had elected to go with the Geshels down the Way more than thirty years ago, after which the Way had been sealed off. It should have been impossible for him to return, but one day he quietly re-appears on Earth to deliver an urgent message. He had traveled down the Way when it was sealed off with that portion of Axis City, and he and its citizens had voyaged hundreds of years and billions of kilometers; they advanced and changed radically on the way. At the end of the Way was a finite but unbounded cauldron of space and energy - a small proto-universe. They transformed themselves into ineffable beings of energy in order to survive the transition. They became as gods to this place, and for a time their creating went well. But it began to corrode and collapse without conflict and contrast between the creators, threatening to take the would-be gods with it. But they were rescued by the Final Mind of this universe, which took pity on them and freed them from the Way. Mirsky had been reconstituted from what he had become and sent back in time to try to persuade the Hexamon to order the re-opening of the Way - and its destruction.

On Gaia, Rhita persuades the aging queen to support her like the queen had supported Patricia. Their expedition leaves for the location of the test gate somewhere in the barbarous hinterlands of Central Asia in the nick of time, as the queen is deposed during their trip. Rhita's clavicle succeeds in expanding the test gate to a usable size, but it warns her that whoever opened the gate in the first place was not human. That night, the Jarts arrive on Gaia en masse. They begin the task of storing and digitizing all the data and life forms on Gaia to transmit down to descendant command. Rhita's consciousness is of special interest to the Jarts, particularly what she knows of Patricia.

In the meantime on Earth proper, consensus has been reached to re-open the Way but not to destroy it. Mirsky disappears. Another entity who should not be there, Ry Oyu, the former gate opener for the Gate Guild, appears. He prods the president of the Hexamon into covertly ordering Korzenowski into destroying the Way regardless of the decision of the citizens. The backlash destroys the Stone. Ry Oyu, Korzenowski, Ser Olmy (who connived at the destruction), and the Jart controlling Olmy, outrun the Way's destruction and arrive at a Jart defense station located over Gaia. The Jarts respect the wishes of Ry Oyu as a representative of descendant command, and before the Way dies, transmit their accumulated data in a single immensely long fluctuation along the singularity/flaw of the Way to the Final Mind.

Korzenowski has himself digitized and sent with the transmission. Olmy is dropped off on the homeworld of the Frants, a communal mind civilization whom he likes. Ry Oyu has Rhita's mind freed; her consciousness gives Ry Oyu the last piece of data needed to reconstitute Patricia Vasquez. Ry Oyu intends to make up for his failure to instruct Patricia properly when she was trying to open a gate back home in Eon; he correctly opens the gate, and bare moments before the Way completely disintegrates around him, finally sends her back home to an Earth where the Death did not happen. Rhita is also returned to Gaia, a Gaia where she never opened a test gate and where the Jarts did not invade. And Pavel Mirsky, still unsatisfied, returns to the beginning of the universe to witness all interesting events between then and the Final Mind, when he will return and report back to it.

== Reception ==
Publishers Weekly stated in its review of the novel: "This slow, visionary tale is less than compelling, but its portrait of the different responses of intricate, interlocking cultures is striking." Kirkus Reviews noted that the novel was "exceedingly hard to follow if you haven't read the original or don't recall precisely what occurred therein...Imaginative but overcomplicated, bogged down in purposeless information and irrelevant subplots, largely devoid of narrative tension. Another disappointment: the ideas are there, the discipline isn't." John Clute in The Washington Post commented that "The plotting is as joyfully contrived as good pulp plotting always tries to be...In short alternating chapters, Bear builds several segments of space-operatic plot towards his central revelations, and does so with competence and wit; but at the heart of Eternity lies a message that cuts deep into any presumption that telling a good story is the same thing as understanding the world. The universe, Bear says in this large, brave, courteous book, is greater than the tale."

== Palaeobiology ==
It has been suggested by David Langford that the physical form of the Jart specimen as described in the novel is a tribute to the real-life bizarre fossil species Hallucigenia.

== See also ==
- Simulated reality
