= Mary Bennett Ritter =

American physician

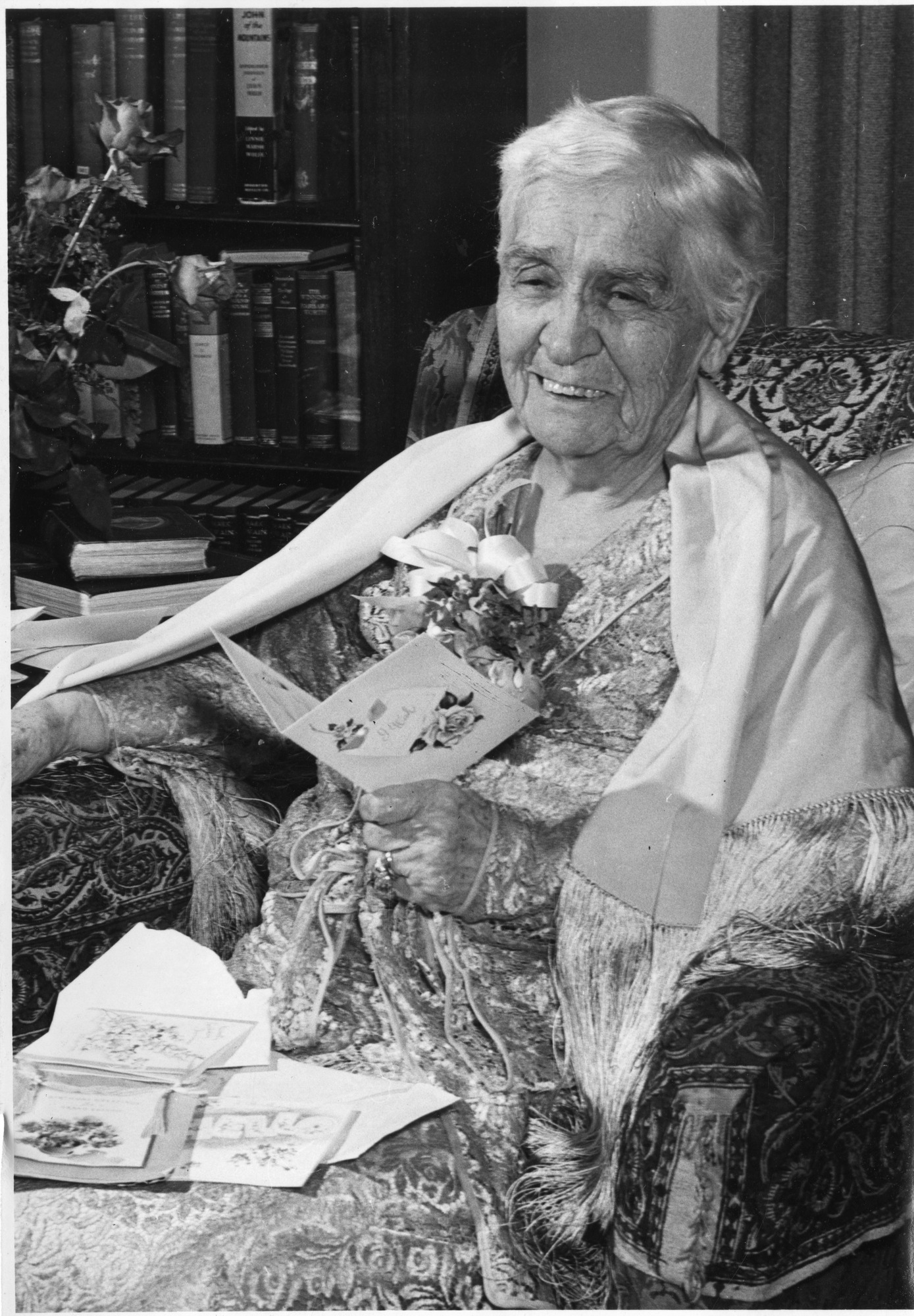
- Ritter on her 87th birthday in 1946
- Born: Mary Elizabeth Bennett; June 7, 1860; Salinas, California
- Died: March 17, 1949 (aged 88); Mountain View, California
- Education: Cooper Medical College
- Occupation: Physician
- Title: M.D.
- Spouse: William Emerson Ritter

Mary Elizabeth Bennett Ritter (June 7, 1860 – March 17, 1949) was an American physician and an advocate for women's rights and public health issues in Berkeley, California. She was known as a pioneer in her time because women were largely excluded from medical training and employment. Despite restricted access, Ritter built a successful private practice. She also advocated for women in medical professions, training for nurses, and sanitation standards in hospitals and doctor's offices. She helped start the Pacific Dispensary for Women and Children, free clinics for poor women and children. In 1933, she published her autobiography, More Than Gold in California.

== Biography ==
Ritter was born Mary Elizabeth Bennett in Salinas, California. She was the daughter of farmers, William Bennett and Abigail Noble Bennett, who did not support her ambition to become a doctor. Before entering medical school, Ritter earned an independent income, which she saved to pay for educational expenses. In 1886, she earned her medical degree from Cooper Medical College in San Francisco, which is now Stanford School of Medicine.

For a time, Bennett lived with and trained under Dr. Euthanasia Sherman Meade.

Bennett remained in the Bay Area and built a successful personal practice for 20 years. She treated both rich and poor on a sliding scale and was known to provide free services for those most in need. In addition to her medical practice, Ritter was also an advocate. In 1891, she worked with women medical students of the University of California (UC) in Berkeley, with funding from Phoebe Hearst, the only woman on the UC Board of Regents, in order to build a gymnasium for women students. She also advocated for better housing for women students. In 1935, UC Berkeley awarded Ritter an honorary Ph.D. for her work as an unofficial first dean of women.

She married zoologist William Emerson Ritter on June 23, 1891. In 1909, Mary Ritter retired from her medical practice and moved to La Jolla, California, where her husband was employed. Together, with funding from Ellen Browning Scripps, Mary Ritter and her husband founded the Marine Biological Association, which would become the Scripps Institution of Oceanography. Separately, she continued her advocacy work and gave many lectures about public health issues as well as woman and infant care.

Ritter wrote an autobiography called More than Gold in California, detailing her work as a physician, her work as a women's advocate, and her role as a partner in her husband's biological projects.

Ritter died in Mountain View, California.

== Works ==
- More than Gold in California. Berkeley: Professional Press, 1933.
- Medical Student and Intern, in: Recollections of Cooper Medical College (1883-1905), by Mary B. Ritter, George Blumer, Louis F. Alvarez, and Walter C. Alvarez. Palo Alto: Stanford Medical School, 1964.
