= William Emerson Ritter =

American biologist (1856–1944)

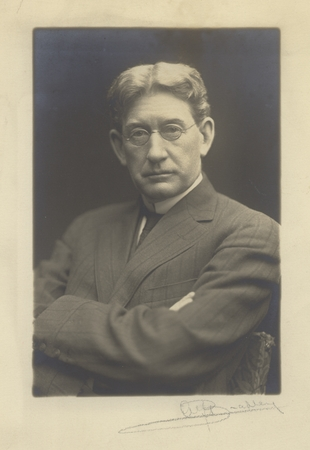
- William E. Ritter
- Born: November 21, 1856; Hampden Township, Columbia County, Wisconsin
- Died: January 10, 1944 (aged 87)
- Education: Harvard University
- Scientific career
- Workplaces: Scripps Institution of Oceanography

William Emerson Ritter (November 21, 1856 – January 10, 1944) was an American biologist.

Ritter initiated and shaped the Marine Biological Association of San Diego (now Scripps Institution of Oceanography) and the American Society for the Dissemination of Science (now the Society for Science). Innovative and entrepreneurial, with a deep desire for human service, he worked tirelessly to educate people in scientific thinking. He was the first biologist to propose a theory of systems, and seems to be the originator of the term organicism for biological purposes.

== Early life ==
William Emerson Ritter was born on a farm on November 21, 1856, in Hampden Township, Columbia County, Wisconsin. His parents, Horatio and Leonora Ritter, moved from New York a few years earlier. The Ritter household included William, his brother Frank, his sisters Mary, Ella, and Flora, and his maternal grandparents, Nathan and Ruby Eason. For the first few years of his life his paternal grandparents, Ezra and Mary Ritter, were also living in the area. The family worked hard on the farm, cultivating corn, wheat, potatoes, apples, and other crops.

Early correspondence shows that he always liked school, and was always seeking meaning—seeking to do something with his life. In 1876, he had the chance to attend high school in Columbus, Wisconsin, which had opened that year. Like many youth, he struggled with what to do with his life. After attending a year of high school, he began to teach at a Hampden school, while continuing his studies. In 1879, he attended college at the Oshkosh Normal School (now the University of Wisconsin–Oshkosh). He left there after only one year due to financial reasons, and took a job teaching in Columbus, Wisconsin. He hoped to earn enough money to go back to college.

In 1881, he took a job as a teacher in Oconto, Wisconsin. There, he continued to read voraciously, and had a particular attraction for science. It was here that he started to develop a passion for helping people understand science. He believed that science was the key to the future of society, and that if people could be taught to think with the reasoned, thoughtful, unbiased critical perspective of science, that much suffering in the world could be alleviated.

== Education and early professional years ==
Ritter went back to college in Oshkosh. While he was there, he read a geology textbook by Joseph LeConte, a professor at the University of California, Berkeley. Ritter was so impressed by the book, and its thoughtful, unbiased perspectives, that he made the decision to go to the University of California and study with Joseph LeConte. He graduated with a teaching certificate from Oshkosh in 1884, and then moved to California to finish his BA at the university.

Ritter needed to earn money for school, and so became a schoolteacher and tutor to pay for his tuition. After a few years of alternately taking classes and teaching to earn money, he graduated with his BA in 1888. The next year he received a scholarship to go to Harvard University for his MA and Ph.D. in zoology.

He spent a few summers at Marine Laboratories, and in 1891 was given a job teaching biology at the University of California, Berkeley.

Joseph LeConte was the chair of all the scientific fields at the university. In the fall of 1891, following the growing trend of science specialization, the science department was divided into four departments, and Ritter was appointed the chair of the new zoology department.

It was also in 1891 that he married a Berkeley physician, Mary Bennett. The couple honeymooned at the Hotel del Coronado near San Diego; they spent part of their time on marine research, collecting blind goby fish in the ocean near Point Loma. In San Diego he met a local physician and naturalist, Dr. Fred Baker, who would later encourage him to build a marine biological laboratory in San Diego.

Ritter was chosen to be among the elite scientists of the 1899 Harriman Alaska Expedition. Chosen for his knowledge of marine biology in general and marine invertebrates in particular, he accompanied the group of scientists on their exploration of Alaska.

== Searching for a place for a California Marine Laboratory ==
Ritter, like many of his contemporaries, believed it was important to study living things in their natural environment rather than isolate them in laboratory conditions. He was familiar with the work being done at field research stations like the Marine Biological Laboratory at Woods Hole (1888), the Hopkins Marine Laboratory (1892), and the Puget Sound Biological Station, later known as the Friday Harbor Laboratories (1903).

Ritter wanted to set up a permanent laboratory to study the biology along the Pacific coast. Between 1892 and 1902, he and his colleagues set up temporary research sites at Pacific Grove, Avalon Bay, and San Pedro Harbor. His goal was frustrated by lack of money and lack of an appropriate site.

In 1903, Ritter was introduced to newspaper magnate E.W. Scripps who, together with his half-sister, Ellen Browning Scripps, agreed to fund his work in San Diego. In early 1903, Ritter established a biological laboratory in the Hotel del Coronado's boathouse at Glorietta Bight. At the end of the year, the Marine Biological Association of San Diego was founded with Ritter as scientific director.

In 1905, the laboratory moved from Coronado to La Jolla where Ritter secured a lease of land in La Jolla Park, just above The Cove. Architects William S. Hebbard and Irving J. Gill built what was known as the "little green laboratory at the Cove."

Two years later, the Biological Association purchased a 170-acre (0.69 km^{2}) site at La Jolla Shores which would provide space for future expansion and isolation from the inevitable growth of La Jolla. Ellen Browning Scripps gave a substantial endowment that made possible the construction of the George H. Scripps Laboratory (1910).

In 1912, the Biological Association became a department within the University of California and was renamed The Scripps Institution for Biological Research, later the Scripps Institution of Oceanography. Donations by Ellen Browning Scripps made possible the construction of a pier, a public aquarium, and a library-museum building. She also paid for the construction of a director's residence and cottages for staff and their families.

== The Ritter-Scripps Partnership ==
Ritter and E.W. Scripps became good friends as well as business partners. It seemed to be an odd couple, as Ritter was kind, quiet, and scholarly, and Scripps was opinionated and boisterous, a self-described "damned old crank." Scripps, however, continued to push Ritter to make biology more practical. They came to believe that since people were biological animals, then biology ought to have some insights into human behavior and human motivation.

After World War I, Scripps and Ritter became convinced that nations needed a forum to rationally work out their differences, rather than going to war. They became great advocates for the League of Nations, believing it could be an alternative to war.

Both Ritter and Scripps believed that science had become too parochial. Many scientists had no desire to solve human problems or even share their insights with the laity. Many scientists felt that sharing their scientific discoveries with the popular media would somehow soil their pure discovery. Ritter and Scripps, on the other hand, believed that it was critical to share these scientific discoveries, and by doing so, would help people to "think like a scientist"—with a reasoned thoughtfulness. By the end of 1920, Ritter and Scripps had come to the conclusion that a newspaper would be the best avenue for sharing these scientific discoveries. With Scripps funding, and Ritter as the scientific director, they started the Science Service in Washington DC, using a newspaper format (now Science News) to share science information and discoveries.

== Organicism ==
One of the great biological controversies of the day was "what is life?" One school of thought was mechanism, which believed that there is no essential difference between a rock and a human life—it's simply a matter of the chemistry involved. If all the chemical reactions were known, we would understand what makes life. The mechanists were fond of saying things like, "the brain secretes thoughts in the same way that the kidneys secrete urine."

On the other hand, the school of thought called vitalism said that there was something different in life than in non-life. There was a vital force—a spiritual force—that made life. Rocks did not have the vital force. Humans did. The vitalists and the mechanists entered endless debates and wrote endless papers advocating their perspective.

According to Ernst Mayr, Ritter introduced the third school of thought: organicism. While the term "organicism" had been used before, Ritter was the first to use it for biological purposes and to create a theory of it. Organicism believed that life was interrelationships between living things, living in a complex web. Today, organicism might be called systems theory. In 1918, Ritter wrote his organicist tome, The Unity of the Organism, which he believed was his magnum opus.

== Later years ==
He continued his study and science advocacy into his later years. He continued to explore the question that E.W. Scripps gave to him, "What is this damned human animal, anyway?" He continued to explore human nature, from a philosophically zoological point of view.

The University of California awarded him the Doctor of Laws degree in 1933. He continued to be a tireless advocate of evolution, science education, and human service. He continued to write, finishing his last published book, The California Woodpecker and I, at the age of 81. At the time of his death, on January 10, 1944, he had 5 book-length unpublished manuscripts written, and parts of many other books and articles. His literary executor, Edna Bailey, consolidated his manuscripts and published sections of them, posthumously, under the title Charles Darwin and the Golden Rule.

== Important works ==
- Ritter, W.E. (1905, May). Organization in scientific research. Popular Science, 67, 49-53.
- Ritter, W.E. (1909, March). Life from a biologist's standpoint. Popular Science Monthly, 75, 174-190.
- Ritter, W.E. (1917). Biology's contribution to a system of morals that would be adequate for modern civilization. Bulletin of the Scripps Institution for Biological Research of the University of California 2, 1-8.
- Ritter, W.E. (1918). The higher usefulness of science. Boston, MA: Gorham Press.
- Ritter, W.E. (1919). The unity of the organism, or the organismal conception of life. Boston, MA: Gorham Press.
- Ritter, W.E. (1923). Why teach science at all? Journal of the National Education Association of the United States, 12, 854-856.
- Ritter, W.E. (1924). The move to prevent the teaching of evolution in the public schools of California. School and Society, 20 (December 6), 729-731.
- Ritter, W.E. (1936). The California woodpecker and I: A study in comparative zoology, in which are set forth numerous facts and reflections by one of us about both of us. Berkeley, CA: University of California Press.
- Ritter, W.E. & Bailey, E. (1954). Charles Darwin and the golden rule. New York: Storm Publishers.

Preceded by Founder of SIO	Director of Scripps Institution of Oceanography; 1903–1924	Succeeded by T. Wayland Vaughan
