= Edwin S. Greeley =

American industrialist, soldier, & philanthropist (1832–1920)

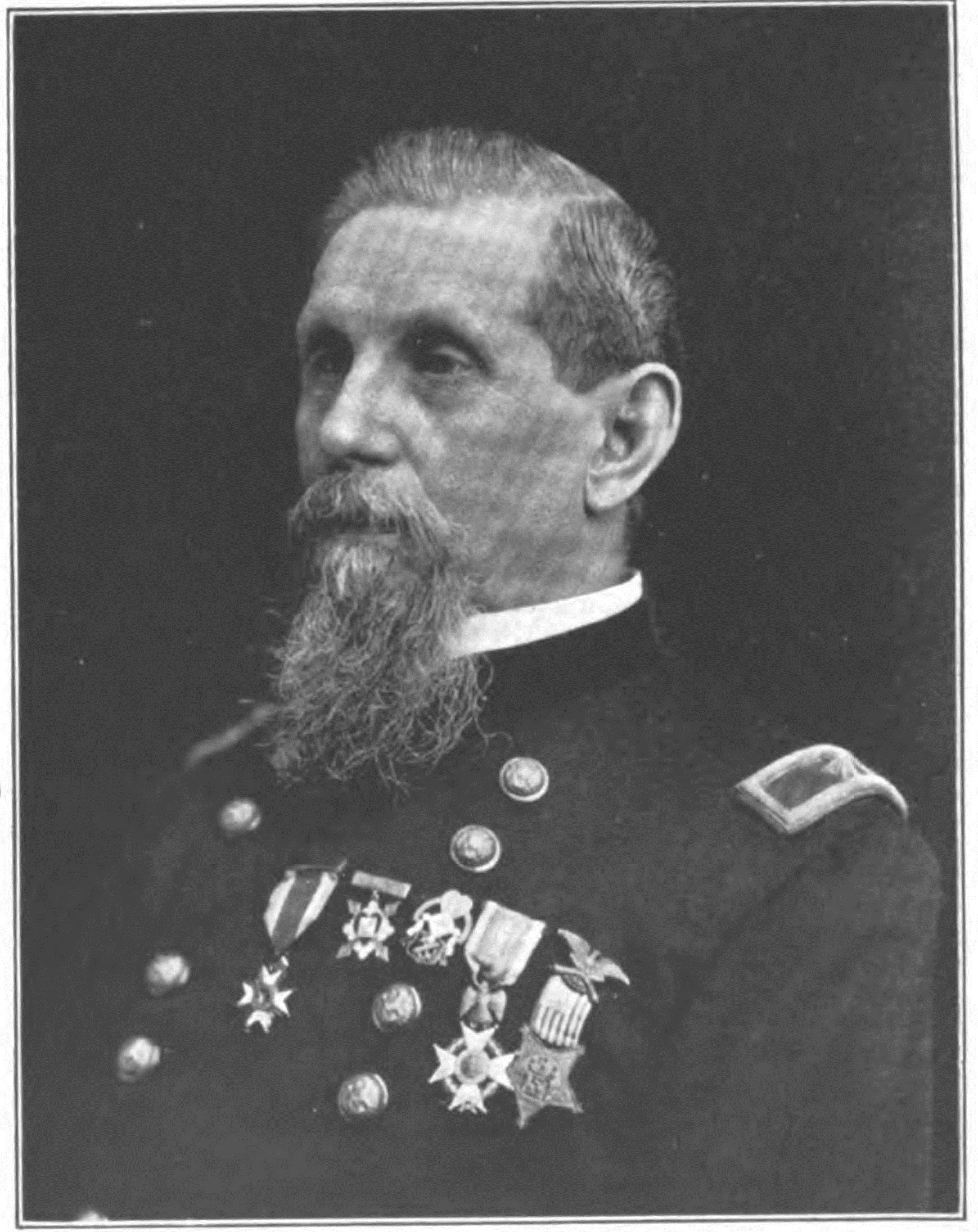

Personal details
- Born: May 20, 1832 Nashua, New Hampshire, U.S.
- Died: January 10, 1920 (aged 87) North Haven, Connecticut, U.S.
- Resting place: Evergreen Cemetery (New Haven, Connecticut)

Military service
- Allegiance: United States
- Branch/service: Union Army
- Years of service: August 31, 1861-September 2, 1865
- Rank: Brevet Brigadier General
- Commands: 10th Connecticut Infantry Regiment

Edwin Seneca Greeley (May 20, 1832 – January 10, 1920) was an industrialist, soldier, and philanthropist who worked in the railroad industry and served in the American Civil War.

== Early life and career ==
Greeley was born in Nashua, New Hampshire, the son of Seneca Greeley and Priscilla Fields and the grandson of Joseph Greeley, who was a soldier in the Revolutionary War. Greeley married Elizabeth Corey of Taunton, Massachusetts on 20 Feb 1856.

After a basic education, he trained as a machinist and worked manufacturing locomotives in Schenectady, New York, Paterson, New Jersey, and New Haven, Connecticut. He remained in locomotive manufacturing until his enlistment into the Army at the start of the Civil War.

== Civil War ==
Greeley enlisted on August 31, 1861 in New Haven, Connecticut. Due to his assistance in raising a company, he was appointed first lieutenant in the 10th Connecticut Infantry Regiment on October 22, 1861. The unit was mustered into federal service on October 2, 1861, and sent south to participate in Burnside's North Carolina Expedition.

He served with the 10th Connecticut throughout the war and rose to become its commanding officer. The regiment served in North Carolina, South Carolina, Florida and was at Appomattox Court House when General Robert E. Lee surrendered the Army of Northern Virginia to General Grant on April 19, 1965.

== Later life ==
After the war Greeley entered a partnership with Luther Tillotson to manufacture telegraph keys. After Tillotson's passing in 1885, Greeley renamed the company The E.S. Greeley & Co. The business suffered greatly following the Panic of 1893 and was dissolved in 1897. Following the dissolution of Greeley and Co., Greeley served as an officer of the Yale National Bank in New Haven, Connecticut.

Greeley was active in the Sons of the American Revolution, and served as its president general from 1904 to 1905. He was also a member of the Military Order of the Loyal Legion of the United States and the Grand Army of the Republic.

== Death ==
Greeley died in North Haven, Connecticut in 1920 at the age of 87. His estate had an estimated 1920 value of $400,000. He is buried in the Evergreen Cemetery in New Haven, Connecticut.

== Dates of rank ==
- 1st Lieutenant - 22 October 1861
- Captain - 25 April 1862
- Major - 3 March 1863
- Lieutenant Colonel - 7 September 1864
- Colonel - 10 February 1865
- Brevet Brigadier General - 13 March 1865
- Mustered out - 25 August 1865
