= Eon (novel) =

1985 science fiction novel by Greg Bear

- Mass market paperback edition
- Author: Greg Bear
- Cover artist: Ron Miller
- Language: English
- Series: The Way
- Genre: Science fiction
- Published: August 1985
- Publisher: Bluejay Books
- Publication place: United States
- Media type: Print (hardback & paperback)
- Pages: 503
- ISBN: 0-8125-2047-5
- Followed by: Eternity

Eon is a science fiction novel by American author Greg Bear published by Bluejay Books in 1985. Eon was nominated for an Arthur C. Clarke Award in 1987. It is the first novel in The Way series; followed by Eternity.

== Plot ==
In the early 21st century, NATO and the Soviet Union are on the verge of a second nuclear war. As the book opens, a 290 km prolate spheroid has been detected following an anomalous energy burst just outside the Solar System. It is found to be duplicate of the asteroid Juno. It moves into an eccentric near-Earth orbit where the rival polities of Earth each try to claim this mysterious object.

The duplicate Juno has been hollowed out along its long axis, subdivided into seven cylindrical chambers, and rotates to provide artificial gravity. The chambers are terraformed, with the second and third containing cities that have been maintained by automatic systems for centuries. This small world is dubbed "the Stone" by the Americans, "the Potato" by the Soviets, and "the Whale" (鲸) by the Chinese; data recovered from the libraries of its absent makers refers to "the Thistledown". Explorers of its interior discover that the end of the Stone's seventh chamber opens into "the Way", a corridor that extends to apparent infinity. The Stone’s original inhabitants evacuated into the Way at some time in its past, which is the explorers’ future.

At the opening of the novel in 2005, Judith Hoffmann, head of the commission that coordinates the exploration of the Stone, recruits theoretical physicist Patricia Vasquez, who arrives at the Stone and receives clearance for all the information discovered by the existing science teams, including the description of a nuclear holocaust—"the Death"—taking place in 2005. Only some NATO science teams are privy to this information; Chinese and Russian science teams are present, but politically restricted.

Since the Stone appears before the recorded date of the Death and there is no record of the Stone's appearance in its libraries, the scientists reason that the Stone may come from an alternate future and have the goal of preventing the war. However, the USSR, angered by the restrictions placed on its scientists, sends space-assault teams to attack the Stone, triggering retaliation on Earth by other governments and a war that isolates survivors from all factions on the Stone.

After the war it is found that the descendants of the Stone's creators live a million kilometers into the Way and 1,200 years into Vasquez's future, in a society called the Hexamon. They have been secretly observing the explorers. Olmy, a humanoid agent of the Hexamon, and his nameless alien Frant colleague, kidnap Vasquez as she begins to discover secrets of the Stone and the Way. They take her to Axis City, their main settlement. Four of her colleagues search for her using a specially-modified V/STOL craft connected to a "tuberider", a device that allows the craft to be hitched to the tubular singularity that runs through the center of the Way.

The rescuers are intercepted when they near Axis City and reunited with Vasquez, who is caught up in the politics of the Hexamon. It is presided over by a governing body, the Nexus, loosely divided into two social groups: The progressive Geshels, who embrace body-swapping and life-extending technologies, and the conservative Naderites. The latter are named after Ralph Nader, who has become identified with empathy and opposition to nuclear war in the centuries since his death. The Hexamon control traffic through spacetime “gates” in the Way’s surface that lead to other worlds, and are threatened by unseen alien invaders called the Jart, who are more adapted to the physics of the Way and live beyond its 2x10^9 kilometer (2 billion kilometer) point.

The Jart attempt to destroy the Hexamon by opening a gate into the heart of a star, allowing superheated plasma to enter the Way. To counter the attack, a coalition within the Hexamon seizes control of the Nexus. The first part of their plan involves accelerating a section of Axis City along the tube to near lightspeed, generating a shockwave that will protect the rest of the city from the blast of stellar plasma while simultaneously sealing any open gates along the Way and destroying the Jart. The second half of their plan requires the separation of the Stone from the now-uninhabitable Way. When this is done, the remains of Axis City and its inhabitants join the Stone (which they call "the Thistledown") in orbit around an Earth that is suffering from nuclear winter in the war's aftermath.

== Major themes ==
The high technology of the Hexamon civilization, with their control over genetic engineering, human augmentation (including post-symbolic communication), the concept of parallel universes, alternate timelines and the manipulation of space-time itself are major themes in the latter half of the novel. The Way itself cuts across space and time: "gates" may be opened through its surface at regular intervals, which lead to space and worlds occupying other timelines, including alternate timelines for the Earth. As a result of commerce through the gates, several alien species have come to be partners of the Hexamon as well.

Information technology and "virtual" realms are another important theme. While being held as a "guest" of the Hexamon, Vasquez learns more about their culture; she discovers that (if they choose to) its citizens are fitted with implants that can store, transmit and replicate part or of all their memories and personality. This technology confers many abilities. One is that they can create virtual replicas of themselves (known as "partials" or "ghosts") that contain functional parts of their full personality and are able to operate independently, on their behalf, and then reintegrate their experiences with their original later. In the event of major injury or even death, their implants (if recoverable and undamaged) can be used to "reload" their personalities into artificially reconstructed replicas of their old bodies, or even into entirely new forms. However, many of its citizens are limited to only two "reincarnations" before their personalities are stored in the Hexamon's memory, where they continue to exist in virtual form. Hexamon technology is also able to reconstruct the bodies of the humans from 21st century, as the Soviet commander Mirsky discovers—when he is fatally shot in the head by his rivals during a confrontation in one of the libraries, the Stone's automatic defense and repair systems are triggered by this act of violence. The system reconstructs Mirsky's shattered skull and brain and resurrects him, but—because he lacks a Hexamon implant—it cannot recover all of his memories, and other physical and neurological functions can only be partially restored.

Conflict between political and ideological factions is another major theme. The book was published in 1985, before the fall of the Berlin Wall and the dissolution of the Soviet Union, and in Bear's projected future (the novel opens in 2005), the cold-war tensions between the Soviet bloc and the NATO countries continue into the 21st century. The arrival of the Stone further destabilizes the situation—the Soviets suspect that the US and its allies are controlling the Stone to gain exclusive access to advanced weapons and technology, and in the first half of the book this accelerates the world's inexorable descent into an all-out nuclear war. In the second half of the book, the theme of ideological conflict is continued through the growing tensions between the hardline political officers assigned to the Soviet force, and their more moderate military leader, Mirsky, who (like Vasquez) gains life-changing insights into the situation that faces them after being exposed to the accelerated learning facilities of the Stone's libraries. These themes are further explored as we learn more about the rivalries between the two major factions of the "Stoners"—the more radical, pro-technology Geshel, and the more conservative and predominantly anti-technological Naderites, named in honor of 20th century consumer rights advocate Ralph Nader (who, in Bear's fictional future, was martyred in the nuclear war).

== Reception ==
Dave Langford reviewed Eon for White Dwarf #85, and stated that "this is impressive SF on the most colossal scale, where the concepts are bigger than universes but human beings still matter desperately. Hear that horrid grating noise? It's the sound of America's other hard-SF writers gnashing their teeth in sick envy." Kirkus Reviews called it "An impressive and often absorbing enterprise, but patchy and problematic, from the unconvincing characters and poor descriptions to fizzling subplots and the prolonged, dull opening. And even when the narrative finally gathers momentum and excitement, the many dazzling ideas here are never firmly under control.

James Nicoll stated about the characters and the novel: "These are technologically advanced people but they are not terribly bright. The book would be much shorter if they were and the plot would make more sense but the nonsensical technology and settings are really very fantastic, wonderful to imagine but ultimately empty." Stephen Baxter commented that "what this book is essentially about is the conceptual breakthrough, a keystone trope of science fiction: the change of scale, the revelation of a meaning previously hidden. In Eon the breakthroughs come at you with bewildering speed. Novel-sized ideas are almost thrown away...You do have to concentrate; it’s rather like watching a particularly Moffat-esque episode of the modern Doctor Who. But for sheer ideative sugar rush, for the exhilarating sense that you almost understand as scenes of staggering complexity flicker relentlessly through your mind, it’s hard to think of a comparison in modern sf."

Alma A. Hromic on SF Site felt that "it has all the technical overkill of some of the worst-afflicted Larry Niven books, with very little character development as a redeeming leaven. It might be a classic, but not all classics stand the test of time too well. This book, despite its scattered points of brilliance, just reads tired, and dated."

== Reviews ==
- Review by Faren Miller (1985) in Locus, #295 August 1985
- Review by Pascal J. Thomas (1985) in Fantasy Review, September 1985
- Review by Don D'Ammassa (1985) in Science Fiction Chronicle, #75 December 1985
- Review by Doc Kennedy (1985) in Rod Serling's The Twilight Zone Magazine, December 1985
- Review by Thomas A. Easton [as by Tom Easton] (1986) in Analog Science Fiction/Science Fact, February 1986
- Review by Baird Searles (1986) in Isaac Asimov's Science Fiction Magazine, February 1986
- Review by Robert Coulson (1986) in Amazing Stories, March 1986
- Review by Gene DeWeese (1986) in Science Fiction Review, Summer 1986
- Review by Mike Moir (1987) in Vector 136
- Review by Martyn Taylor (1987) in Vector 136
- Review by Rachel Pollack (1987) in Foundation, #39 Spring 1987
- Review by L. J. Hurst (1988) in Paperback Inferno, #70
- Review by Andy Robertson (1988) in Interzone, #23 Spring 1988
- Review by Andy Sawyer (1989) in Paperback Inferno, #77
- Review [French] by Pascal J. Thomas (1989) in Fiction, #410
- Review by John Gilbert (1989) in Fear, September 1989
- Review [French] by Piet Hollander (1989) in Yellow Submarine, #65
- Review [French] by Jonathan Dornet (1989) in A&A, #126-127
- Review by John D. Owen (1998) in Vector 202
- Review [French] by Tom Clegg (1999) in Galaxies, #15
- Review by uncredited (2002) in Vector 224
- Review by Tony C. Smith (2009) in StarShipSofa, No 81
- Review by Charles Dee Mitchell (2014) in Big Sky, #3: SF Masterworks 1
- Review by Mark Chitty (2014) in Big Sky, #3: SF Masterworks 1
