= Brian Andrews (doctor) =

American neurosurgeon

Brian T. Andrews (born June 5, 1955) is an American neurosurgeon. He specializes in pediatric neurosurgery, minimally invasive spinal surgery, brain tumors, neuro-oncology, neurotrauma, spinal stenosis and general neurosurgery. He is chairman of the Department of Neurosciences at California Pacific Medical Center and a founder of the California Pacific Neuroscience Institute.

== Background ==
Brian Andrews was born in Powell River, British Columbia to his parents Emil Andrews and Shirley Andrews. The family moved to San Francisco, California in 1960.

At age ten, Andrews began playing the accordion in restaurants throughout the Bay Area; he used the tips he earned to pay for his college education at University of Southern California, where he received a Bachelor of Science degree in 1977.

== Career ==
Andrews went on to complete his medical education at University of California, San Francisco School of Medicine where he served his internship and residency. He later attained his National Board Certification in 1982 and his American Board of Neurological Surgery in 1991.

Andrews specializes in pediatric neurosurgery, minimally invasive spinal surgery, brain tumors, neuro-oncology, neurotrauma, spinal stenosis and general neurosurgery. He is also among a number of physicians around the country participating in an ambitious program to improve care for 30 million Americans suffering from back pain, sponsored by the National Committee for Quality Assurance. The Back Pain Recognition Program aims to reduce the number of superfluous tests and procedures and increase the adoption of treatments that are proven to work.

In addition to being a founder of the California Pacific Neuroscience Institute, Andrews also founded the neuro-oncology program at California Pacific Medical Center.

Andrews has received numerous honors and awards including the Physician Recognition Award from the National Committee for Quality Assurance.

He is a member of the Congress of Neurological Surgeons, American Association of Neurological Surgeons, American Medical Association, California Medical Association, San Francisco Medical Society and the California Association of Neurological Surgeons.

In addition to being a neurosurgeon, Andrews is also an author. He has written two novels of fiction: Knife Under Fire and The California Mille; as well as, several medical books: Intensive Care in Neurosurgery, Neurotrauma and Pediatric Neurosurgical Intensive Care.

== Publications ==
- "Neurotrauma" (2004) Thieme Georg Verlag.
- "Intensive Care in Neurosurgery" (2003) Theime Medical Publishers.
- "The California Mille" (1997) Blue Jag Press.
- "Knife Under Fire" (1993) Caduceus Press.
- "Neurosurgical Intensive Care" (1993) Mcgraw-Hill.
