= Sarah Winchester =

American heiress of William Wirt Winchester (1839–1922)

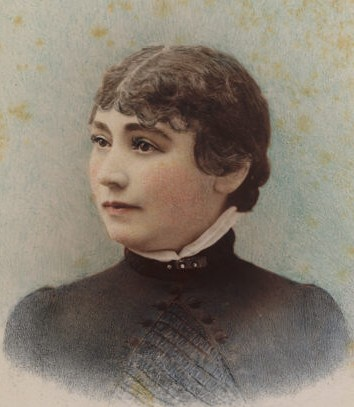
- Colored photograph of Winchester, c. 1880s
- Born: Sarah Lockwood Pardee; June 4, 1839; New Haven, Connecticut, U.S.
- Died: September 5, 1922 (aged 83); San Jose, California, U.S.
- Resting place: Evergreen Cemetery; New Haven, Connecticut, U.S.
- Other name: Sallie
- Occupation: Real estate investor
- Known for: Winchester Mystery House
- Height: 4 ft 10 in (147 cm)
- Spouse: William Wirt Winchester (m. 1862; died 1881)
- Children: Annie Pardee Winchester (born/died 1866)

Sarah "Sallie" Lockwood Winchester (née Pardee; June 4, 1839 – September 5, 1922) was an American heiress, real estate investor, and philanthropist, who amassed great wealth after the death of her husband, William Wirt Winchester, and her mother-in-law, Jane Ellen Hope.

Winchester has become known for the construction of Llanada Villa, a mansion home in San Jose, California. Despite popular rumor claiming the house was built to trap spirits and ghosts that she thought were following her, there is no evidence for these rumors. Six months after her death, the home was turned into a tourist attraction, now known as the Winchester Mystery House. Testimonies and records from those who knew her describe her as intelligent, kind, a savvy financial manager, and not superstitious, remaining sharp-witted even into old age. However, in the years since her death, she has been depicted in popular culture as guilt-ridden, mad with grief, and delirious in her later life.

== Early life ==
Sarah Lockwood Pardee was the fifth child and fourth daughter born to parents Leonard and Sarah Pardee (née Burns) in the summer of 1839 at 29 Orange Street in New Haven, Connecticut. Though she was formally called Sarah, she was named after her paternal grandmother, Sally Pardee Goodyear, and was called Sallie all her life, signing all her correspondence using this name. She had four sisters and one brother who survived to adulthood. One sister, her namesake Sarah E. Pardee, and Leonard and Sarah's firstborn died from cholera when she was a year old. The name Lockwood was after Pardee's father's longtime friend Lockwood Sanford, who was a well-known New England wood engraver.

Winchester's father was a skilled craftsman who had established a mill and wood shop called Leonard Pardee & Company.

Growing up, Pardee was educated, had a private French tutor, and took music lessons. Her family had progressive ideas for the time regarding religion and philanthropic choices, publicly expressing their opinions on such things as abolition, suffrage and animal rights. As an adult Sallie supported her sister Belle Merriman's animal-rights activism, and is known to have chastised a boy who sought permission to hunt robins on her property.

Pardee lived with her family on Brown Street from 1853, when she was 14, until 1862 when she was married.

According to Mary Jo Ignoffo in her book Captive of the Labyrinth, Winchester was an independent thinker who was not as social as her siblings as a teenager.

== Marriage and family deaths ==
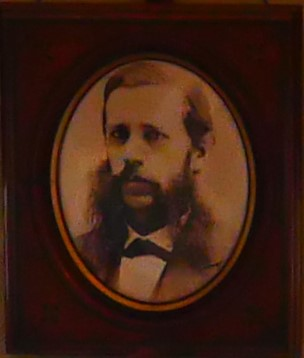
William Wirt Winchester portrait

During the American Civil War, Pardee, who was under five feet tall and then twenty-three, married William Wirt Winchester, then twenty-five, on Tuesday, September 30, 1862. William was the son of a wealthy shirt manufacturer who would later become known for being the founder of the Winchester Repeating Arms Company. The two had been childhood friends and neighbors.

Because of building-material shortages due to the Civil War, the two lived with William's parents on Court Street, New Haven. They hoped to build their own home on Prospect Hill. After the war, in 1866, the new home began construction.

On June 15, 1866, Sallie gave birth to a baby girl they named Annie Pardee Winchester, in honor of William's late sister, who had died during childbirth. The child suffered from marasmus and died within a month of her birth. The couple was devastated and withdrew from society, with Sallie remaining secluded for nearly a year.

During the construction of their home on Prospect Hill, the Winchesters embraced learning about architecture and design. Architecture and design became life-long hobbies for Sallie, who also learned about real estate investment and financial strategies from William and her father-in-law.

The house, completed in 1868, was approximately 20,000 square feet and had over twenty rooms, with marble floors, decorative fireplaces and chandeliers, large bay windows, plasterwork ceilings, and a circular drive in front.

In June 1869, Sallie’s father died, at the age of sixty, possibly from rheumatoid arthritis.

Between 1880 and 1881, Sallie lost three close family members. Her mother died in May 1880; her father-in-law, Oliver Winchester, died in December that same year; and her husband died from tuberculosis in March 1881.

After the loss of so many family members, Sallie spent time at the seashore, followed by a trip to Europe.

== Inheritance ==
Shortly before his death, William made out bank drafts to his wife totaling $7,500 and designated her the executrix of his will. Sallie was forty years old when her husband died. She thenceforth controlled 777 Winchester Repeating Arms Company shares, valued at $77,700 at the time. Between 1880 and 1885, she earned dividends from the stock, which averaged $7,900 annually. With the death of her mother-in-law, Jane Winchester, in 1898, Sallie inherited a further 2,000 shares of Winchester Repeating Arms Company stock, then worth about $400 per share.

== California ==
After the loss of so many family members and after a physician recommended the drier and warmer climate for her worsening rheumatoid arthritis, Winchester decided to move to California, which was touted at the time as a place with a good climate, soil, and relatively cheap land for sale. She had previously been to San Francisco with her husband and had enjoyed her visit.

In 1884, Mary Converse, her eldest sister, died of cancer, convincing Winchester's sisters that they too should move to California. Winchester paid for her sister Isabelle "Belle" Merriman and Estelle Gerard and their children's move. Another sister, Nettie Sprague, also moved to California as her husband, Homer Sprague, and became president of a college for young women in the San Francisco area. Winchester supported her relatives financially for the rest of their lives.

Along with her sisters, the reinsman who drove her carriages, Frank Carroll, accompanied Winchester to California. Once in California, Winchester found Euthanasia Meade, who became her personal physician, until Meade died in 1895.

Edward "Ned" Rambo, the San Francisco agent for the Winchester Repeating Arms Company, showed Winchester properties in the Santa Clara Valley.

=== Llanada Villa ===
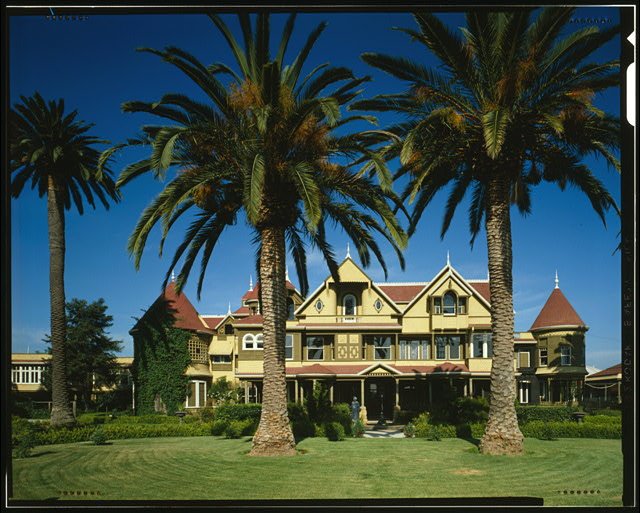

The house that would eventually be named the Winchester Mystery House was purchased for $12,570 from John Hamm by Winchester in 1886 and was situated on a 45-acre ranch in the Santa Clara Valley. She named the eight-room farmhouse and property Llanada Villa, since the area reminded her of the Llanada Alavasa in Spain, a place that she and her husband had visited ten years earlier. On this property, Winchester was one of the first to grow fruit in the area. The first person Winchester hired was Rambo to become foreman of the farm, though he did also continue his duties at the Winchester office in San Francisco. In addition, she supplied housing on the property for Carroll's family. She hired local people to staff the house and farm, many of whom were from Europe, China and, later, Japan.

The house was located on a country lane named Santa Clara–Los Gatos Road. After Winchester died the road was renamed first Winchester Road and then Winchester Boulevard. Her initial plan was to build a house to accommodate her whole family. This never happened partly due to the isolated location and partly due to the constant construction. The only family member to live with her was her niece Maria "Daisy" Merriman, who moved in when she was twenty-one in 1890.

Within the first six months, Ignoffo estimates that the house had increased in size to twenty-six rooms. Winchester attended Expositions that inspired her interior and exterior design. As was typical of the time, the design included much ornamentation, including a statue of Hebe, which still stands at the home, along with intricately laid patterned wood floors of a variety of hardwoods including teak and mahogany, embossed wall coverings that looked like leather or metal, ceilings decorated with stencils and moldings, German chandeliers, Austrian art glass, Asian furnishings and French paintings.

The gardens were filled with ornamental trees, shrubs and flowers. It is estimated that Winchester had plants from over 110 countries in the villa gardens.

Winchester hired at least two architects, but they would not have been of the caliber she was used to from New Haven. Ignoffo speculates that this could be why she chose to run the construction project herself, seeking the advice of carpenters she hired. Her interest in architecture was evident by her subscription to journals such as Architectural Record. She did all the drawings and design but did not have an overall plan. She worked room by room. If she was unhappy with the results, she would tear the section down to rebuild, or abandon it for a while before returning to work on it again. The result was a rambling maze.

The windows, which are pastel-colored, asymmetrically designed and sharply beveled, were initially believed to be made by Tiffany & Co. Historian Jim Wolf believed that the windows were most likely made by glass artist John Mallon from Alexander Dunsmuir's company, the Pacific American Decorative Company, since this style of glass could also be found at Craigdarroch Castle in British Columbia, Canada. Wolf's theory was confirmed when an envelope with the Dunsmuir company seal on it, postmarked July 1894, was found within the walls of a dining room that was undergoing restoration. A note with Winchester's handwriting was on the envelope.

The upper-level windows have a spider-web tracery, a popular design of the time. Windows on the right and left side of a brick fireplace have Shakespearean quotes from Richard II and Troilus and Cressida. Many of the windows purchased were never installed and are stored in the house.

After 1896, Winchester added stories to the then two-story home. In some areas the home was five stories high, and she added a seven-story tower that the San Jose News said was rebuilt sixteen times before Winchester was satisfied. She added plumbing and electrical systems that were state-of-the-art at the time. She built an indoor garden with an irrigation system that watered the plants; sloping floors would channel the water to trap doors, from which it would then be piped to outdoor flower boxes. She installed an annunciator, a common early type of intercom, to call servants.

Construction on the home was often delayed or stopped for months at a time.

Letter from Winchester to Jennie Bennett, June 11, 1898

I am constantly having to make upheaval for some reason. For instance, my upper hall which leads to the sleeping apartment was rendered so unexpectedly dark by a little addition that after a number of people had missed their footing on the stairs I decided that safety demanded something to be done so, over a year ago, I took out a wall and put in a skylight; Then I had to have plastering done and as that could not well be done in the heat which succeeded, I had to wait for cooler weather; then I became rather worn and tired out and dismissed all the work-men to take such rest as I might through the winter.

— Captive of the Labyrinth, revised and updated, by Mary Jo Ignoffo

The unusual design was not uncommon at the time. Elizabeth Colt, in Hartford, constructed a home over many years that was described as rambling and asymmetrical. Homes being constructed in the San Francisco area, such as Haas–Lilienthal, were described as "crazy quilts" being patched together.

Winchester focused on her construction project instead of giving in to local rumors and insults. She kept tradespeople working during the many years the house was constructed. The house is Victorian, with Eastlake and Stick design elements. The original color was blue, but was later changed to yellow.

Winchester, over time, increased the size of her property around Llanada Villa from the original 45 acres to 160 acres.

In 1893, Winchester's youngest sister, Estelle Pardee Gerard, became ill. She was moved from San Francisco to Llanada Villa with the hope that the drier climate would improve her health. It did not, and in January 1894, Gerard died from cirrhosis despite being treated by Winchester's personal physician, Meade.

=== 1906 San Francisco earthquake ===
It is unknown if Winchester was at Llanada Villa during the 1906 San Francisco earthquake, which caused tremendous damage to the building. Just prior to the earthquake, based on letters to her lawyer Leib, Winchester was at her home in Atherton.

Damage to Llanada Villa included a seven-story tower; the third- and fourth-floor additions and most of the chimneys collapsed. The plaster, wood and tile work was destroyed. Winchester had the debris cleared and the home made safe but no further building occurred. This left the home with water pipes protruding, second-story doors opening to nothing where balconies once were, and staircases going up to a ceiling where once another level existed. Only essential repairs were done to the home after the earthquake. Because she stopped construction on her home and did not rebuild, local newspapers declared her a madwoman. The only thing she added to the home was an elevator in 1916.

=== Other properties ===
After purchasing the Llanada Villa, Winchester invested in more property in the area. She paid a $10,000 gold coin for a home for the Merrimans. Extensive renovations and additions were made to this home under the direction of Winchester and her sister. As of 2018 this home was valued at almost $7,000,000.

Winchester purchased 140 acres of land next to the Merriman home with the intention of raising and marketing large carriage horses. The purchase of the land proved difficult since the land title was not clear. She hired Samuel Franklin "Frank" Leib to complete the purchase and sort out the title of the property. The horse business venture was not successful.

In 1903 Winchester purchased several properties in Atherton, one of which was purchased for the Marriotts to live in.

In 1904 Winchester purchased land in the San Francisco Bay area near Burlingame. After this she commissioned the construction of an ark, or houseboat, which was a trend at the time, to be docked at her Burlingame property.

She owned multiple rental properties in Palo Alto, believing that properties near Stanford University would increase in value, along with two homes in Atherton, each on four acres, and thirty undeveloped acres of land. In 1907 she purchased a Tudor-style home in Burlingame Park, where she stayed while overseeing the dredging of a canal for her houseboat.

The houseboat remained unscathed after the San Francisco earthquake. Winchester and the Marriotts lived in the houseboat while repairs were made to their properties.

In 1907, Winchester purchased a home at 44 Inglewood Lane that became her full-time home. This home was so attractive that a photo of it was featured in the program for the Panama–Pacific International Exposition of 1915.

=== Presidential visits ===
In 1901 President William McKinley visited the Santa Clara Valley; Winchester did not invite him to visit her despite the president knowing who her husband, Will, was and having recommended him to be added to a memorial list of Historic Families of America in Washington D.C.

In 1903 President Theodore Roosevelt visited California but did not visit Winchester. Rumors have persisted that Roosevelt attempted to visit her but her gate was locked. Roosevelt did not want to meet Winchester since he was worried that it would be seen as him promoting Winchester rifles. While president he was careful not to endorse any products. In addition, Winchester was not in San Jose but was in San Mateo preparing for her niece Marian "Daisy" Merriman's wedding to Frederick A. Marriott III.

=== Politics ===
Winchester mostly avoided politics but on one occasion she became vocal. In 1902, a candidate for county assessor named D. F. McGraw named Winchester in his campaign speeches stating she was only assessed $640 for all her properties, which he would rectify if voted in. In reality, she was assessed more than $80,000. The $640 was only for one of her many properties. Winchester sent him a letter that was published in a local newspaper expressing her anger, and rebuking him for lying. She accused him of only focusing on her in his campaign because she was a woman unable to vote. McGraw lost the election.

=== Investments and projects ===
In 1889 William Converse, the then president of the Winchester Repeating Arms Company and Winchester's financial advisor, died. Winchester decided to look after her own finances from that point on and hired Leib as her lawyer.

In 1893 the stock market collapsed and many banks failed. While Winchester lost money on her investments, because she was very conservative with her decisions, she never suffered serious financial trouble.

By 1898, the Winchester Repeating Arms Company was profitable again. Winchester added William's portion of company stock when her mother in law died the same year.

Winchester was successful with her real estate purchases, real estate investments and financial strategies that she sustained or improved her wealth.

After the 1906 San Francisco earthquake, Winchester undertook a project that she imagined would attract visitors to the Burlingame area. She envisioned coastal estates with personal docks and passages that visitors visiting California would enjoy after going through the soon to be completed Panama Canal. She designed and oversaw the construction of a system of canals with locks and installed a moon bridge near her houseboat. One of the contractors Winchester hired also rented some of her property to use as farmland. He also stole sand and gravel from her property, leaving the property with large ditches. It was stated that "half the sidewalks in Burlingame were made from sand stolen from Winchester's beach by a well-known contractor at the time." Winchester successfully sued the contractor for back rent, property damage, and stolen property. After the death of Carroll in 1909 at the age of fifty, Winchester lost interest in the canal project.

Winchester was so successful with her finances that between 1910 and 1912, she received $260,000 each year in stock dividends. However, in 1919, the Winchester Company was having financial difficulties and the value of her stocks decreased from ten million to about 3.75 million dollars.

=== Philanthropy ===
Official dedication for the William Wirt Winchester Hospital

IN MEMORY OF WILLIAM WIRT WINCHESTER THIS ANNEX OF THE NEW HAVEN HOSPITAL TO BE USED FOR THE CARE OF PERSONS SUFFERING FROM TUBERCULOSIS WAS ERECTED AND ENDOWED BY HIS WIFE

— Captive of the Labyrinth, revised and updated, by Mary Jo Ignoffo

Most donations by Winchester were done anonymously, only known by her lawyer and discovered after her death from letters and ledgers. She supported social causes, such as being on the finance committee supporting a celebration of California's fiftieth birthday in 1900, and being a paying member of a local chapter of the Red Cross. After the 1906 San Francisco earthquake, Winchester donated $150 to the San Jose Relief Fund. She supported the "Save the Redwoods" campaign by donating $500.

After Frank Carroll's sudden death, Winchester purchased a home for and continued to financially support Carroll's wife and children.

Her largest donations were to the tubercular ward in New Haven. Initially Winchester donated $300,000 anonymously. Over a ten-year period, Winchester donated over a million dollars to the hospital, which opened on April 4, 1918, as the William Wirt Winchester Hospital. Winchester was not well enough to attend the dedication ceremony. The hospital became part of the Yale School of Medicine in 1948.

Because most were unaware of her philanthropy, the press and those who did not know her viewed her as miserly.

== Failing health and death ==
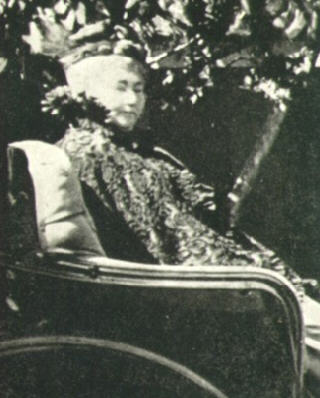
Sarah Winchester

By 1903, Winchester's rheumatoid arthritis had disfigured her hands and feet, limiting her ability to walk and write. She was losing her teeth and required dentures. Writing was painful, requiring the help of a stenographer and her niece, Daisy. In 1911, her health improved somewhat, allowing her to sew, though the newspapers reported that she was close to death. At this time Winchester hired Henrietta Sivera to act as a nurse and secretary. She remained a trusted employee until Winchester's death.

By 1920, Winchester rarely left her home, shopping for clothing and material via mail order or having store employees bring purchases out to her in her car.

In early September 1922, Winchester was driven from her home in Atherton to Llanada Villa to be closer to her doctor, who lived in San Jose. She died on Tuesday, September 5, 1922. She was buried in New Haven at Evergreen Cemetery beside her husband, William and her daughter, Annie.

Leib, who by that time had been her lawyer for more than twenty five years, looked after her bequests in her will. Her estate was estimated to be worth between three and four million dollars, considerably less than what her estate was rumored to be worth. Winchester named five of her closest employees in her will, along with all of her living family members. Her niece, Daisy, inherited a home in Palo Alto and the contents of all other homes. Any remaining money left in the trusts that she set up for family members was to be left to the William Wirt Winchester Hospital when they died. The will stated that if anyone disputed her wishes they would receive nothing.

Most of Winchester's properties were sold off. However, the Llanada Villa was in such poor repair that it was deemed worthless and that only the property held value. John Brown was the only person interested in the land but he was unable to purchase it so a lease agreement was reached. Six months after Winchester's death her home was opened as a tourist attraction. Brown purchased the property in 1931.

== Superstition and madness ==
In 1908, the first mention of angry spirits haunting Winchester appeared in the San Francisco Examiner with rumors that she was considering selling Llanada Villa. These stories spread to include all her properties. The rumors stated that if she sold any, she believed she would die, and there were hints she was involved with the occult. Despite these rumors, Winchester sold one of her Atherton homes.

Incorrect rumors spread about Winchester's houseboat, stating that she purchased the boat after the earthquake for fear of a biblical flood. This is incorrect since she purchased the houseboat two years prior to the earthquake because they were popular at the time.

The rumors painted her as reclusive and mentally unstable, filled with superstition, guilt and fear.

Fred Larsen (Winchester's chauffeur after Carroll's death), Ted Hansen (an employee's son who grew up at Llanada Villa), Frank Leib (Winchester's lawyer), and Miss Henrietta Severs (Winchester's nurse and companion of many years), were all people who openly stated that Winchester was not superstitious but was intelligent and kind. None of her former employees, servants or relatives ever claimed she was mad or superstitious.

Statement by Roy Leib, son of Winchester's lawyer, Frank Leib, summer, 1925

Mrs. Winchester was a sane and clear headed woman as I have ever known, and she had a better grasp of business and financial affairs than most men. The commonly believed supposition that she had hallucinations is all bunk.

— Captive of the Labyrinth, revised and updated, by Mary Jo Ignoffo

== Winchester Mystery House ==
Since the Winchester Mystery House opened as an attraction in 1923, the owners chose to embrace and expand upon the rumors and stories that had been in print and discussed by the community. These stories have persisted and been written about extensively.

Winchester is depicted as superstitious and crazy instead of innovative and intelligent. She had an apparent love of the number thirteen, demonstrated by thirteen chandeliers, bathrooms, thirteen hooks and thirteen robes, which were all added after Winchester's death according to carpenter James Perkins. She is said to have built the maze of a home to ward off and confuse evil spirits, never stopping construction for 38 years for fear of dying, when in fact she stopped construction many times, including after the 1906 earthquake devastated the home. The room that she was purported to hold nightly seances with the spirits, was actually her gardener's bedroom.

Despite claims that the house is the most haunted house in the United States, according to investigator Joe Nickell, there is no evidence that the Winchester Mystery House is haunted.

Her staff, friends and family were unhappy with the rumors surrounding Winchester and her house and the Carrolls were distressed that Winchester's house was turned into a haunted tourist attraction.

Interior details of the Winchester Mystery House
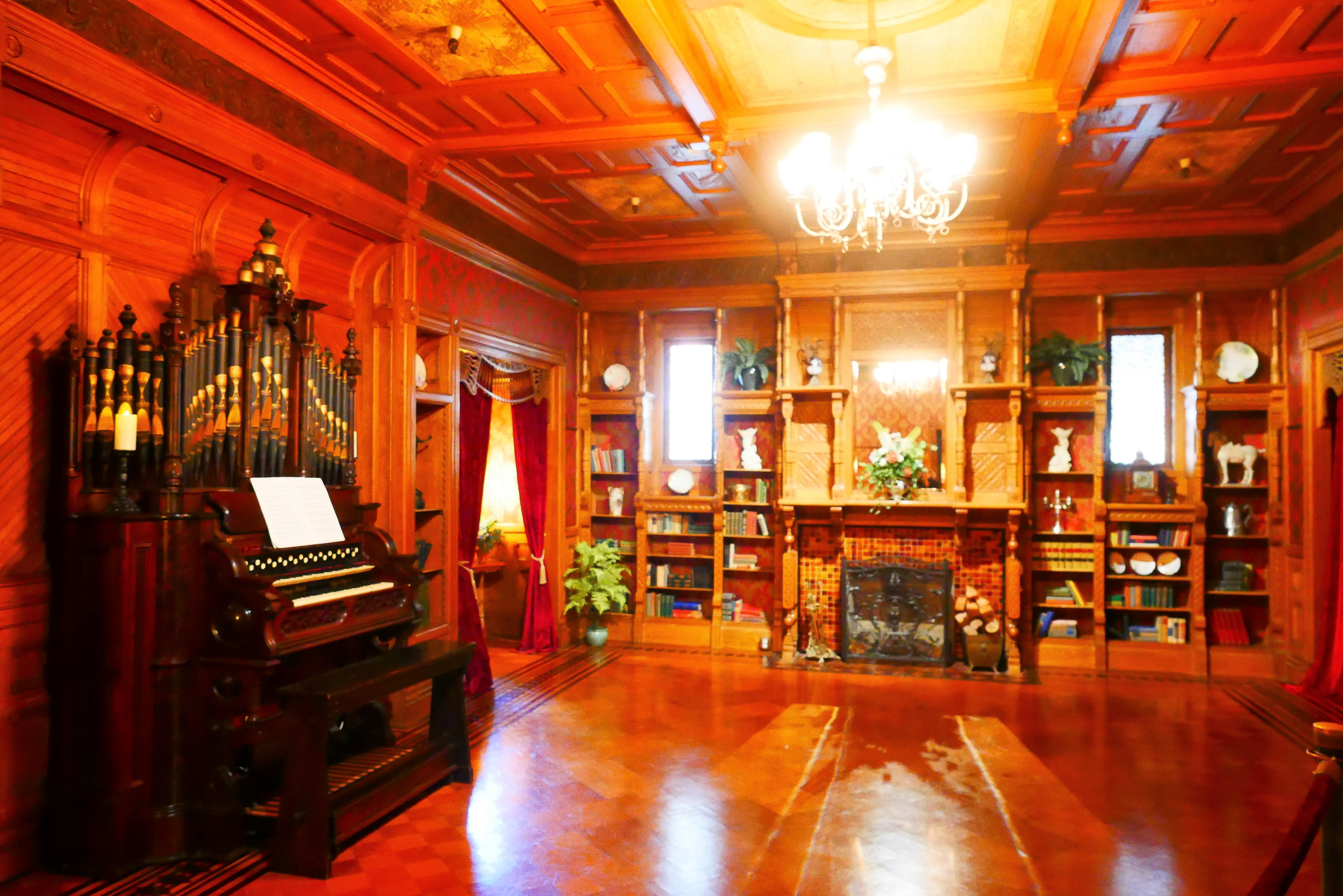
Organ, fireplace, and windows with Shakespeare quotes

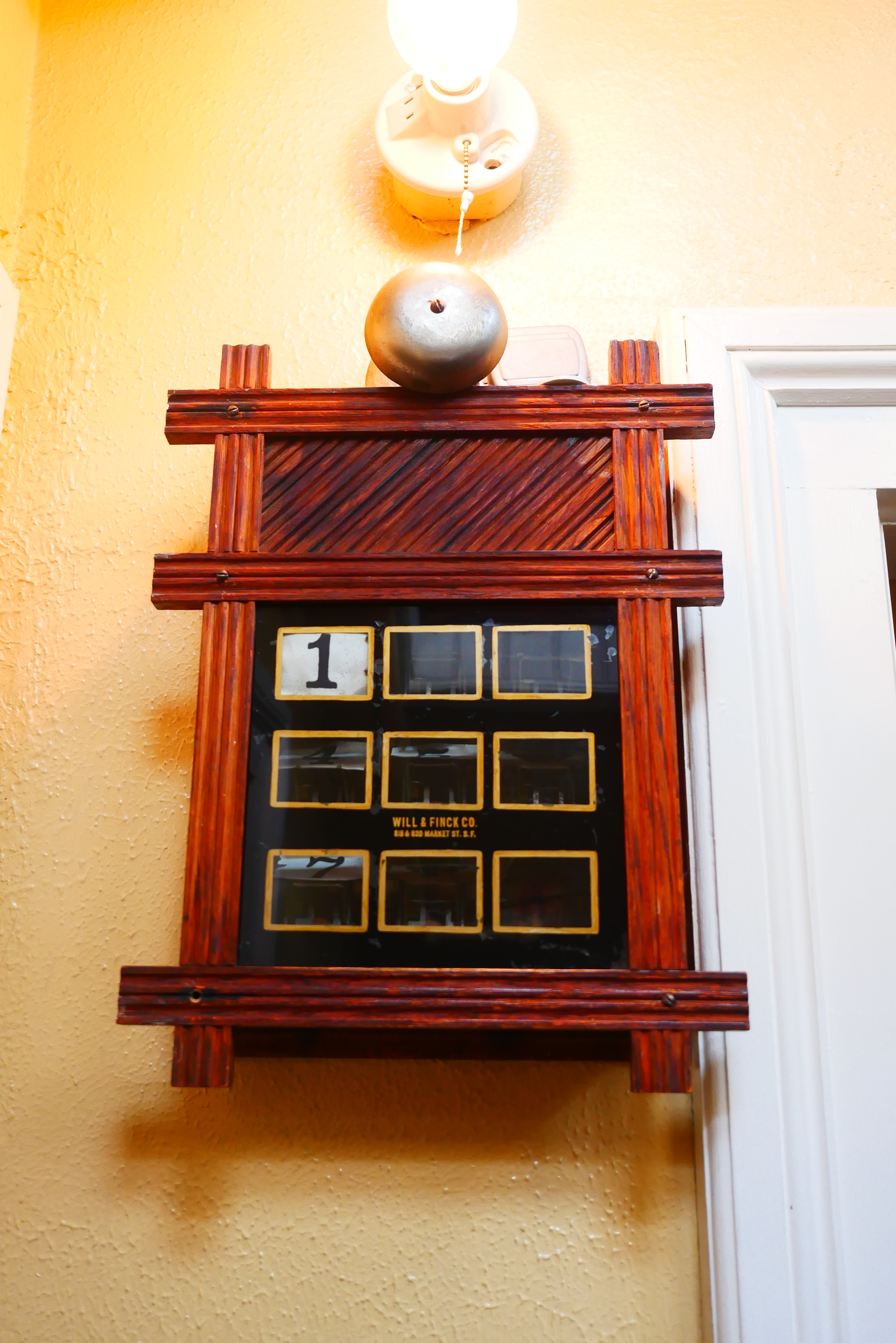
Annunciator intercom

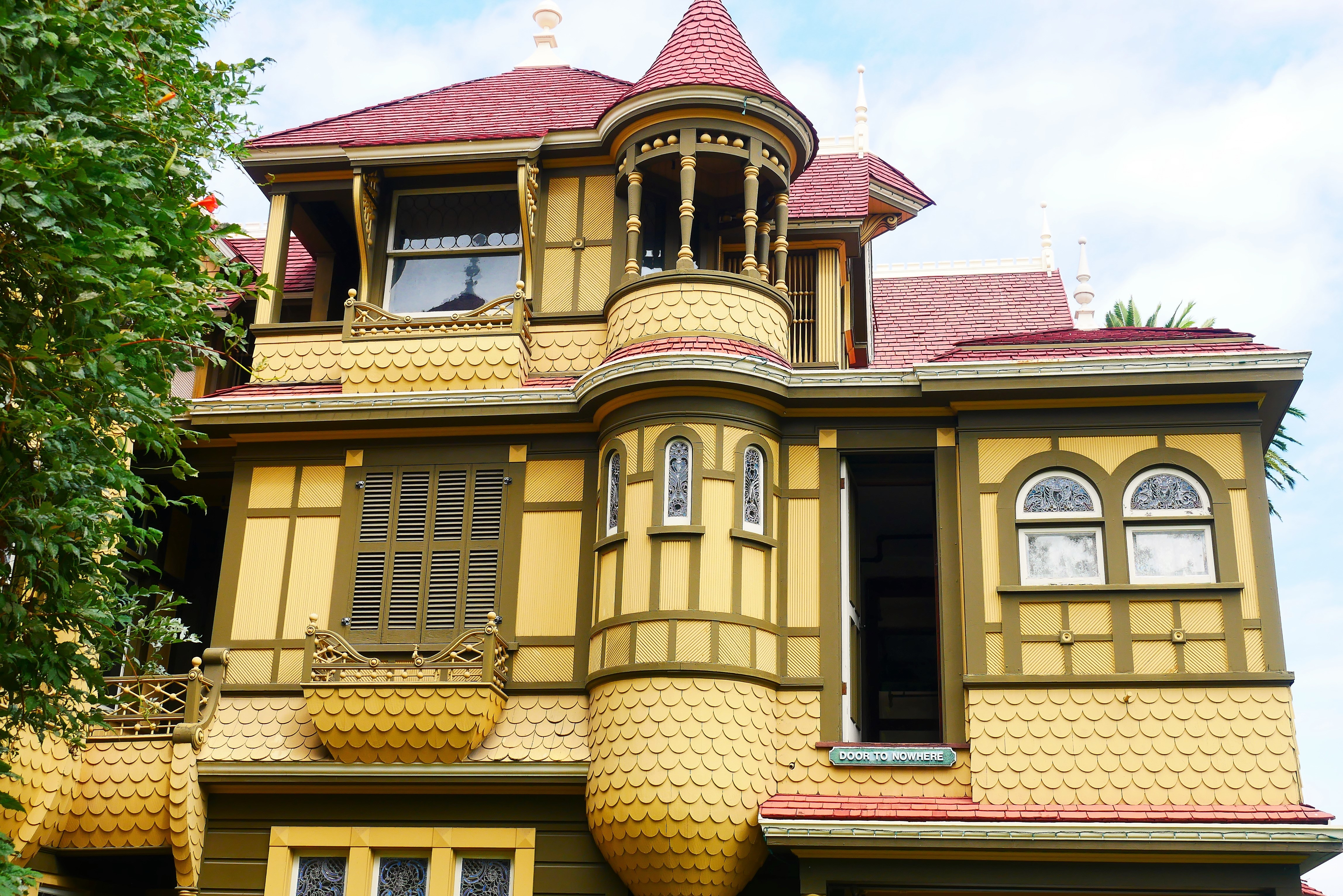
Doorway to nowhere

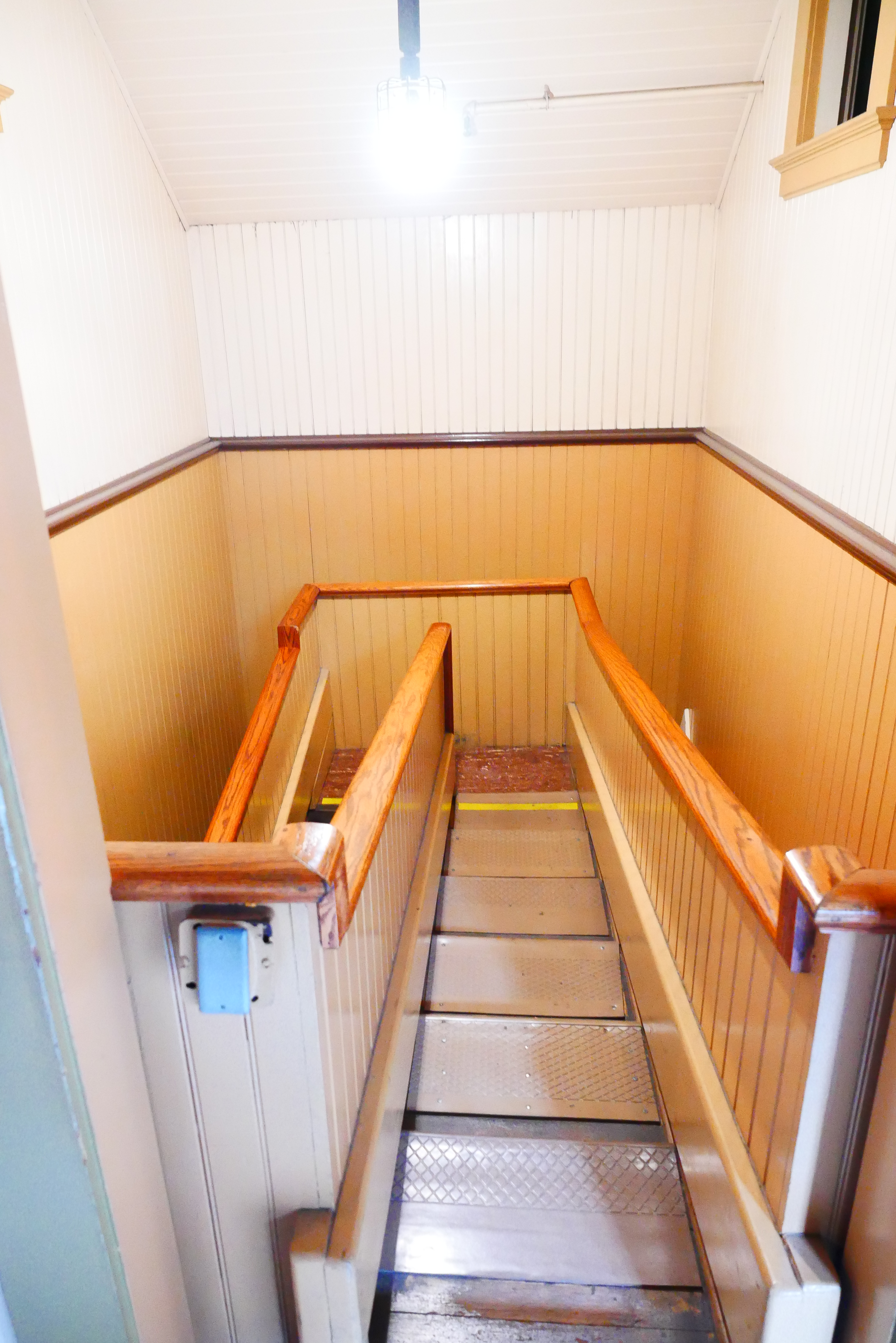
44 stairs that rise ten feet to accommodate Winchester's arthritis
