= William Wirt Winchester =

American businessman

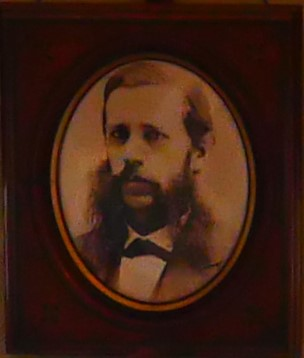
- Born: June 22, 1837; Baltimore, Maryland, US
- Died: March 7, 1881 (aged 43); New Haven, Connecticut, US
- Resting place: Evergreen Cemetery
- Known for: Winchester Repeating Arms Company
- Spouse: Sarah Lockwood Pardee (m. 1862)
- Children: 1
- Parent(s): Oliver Winchester; Jane Ellen Hope

William Wirt Winchester (June 22, 1837 – March 7, 1881) was an American and the treasurer of the Winchester Repeating Arms Company, a position he held until his death in 1881.

== Family ==
He was born on June 22, 1837, to Oliver Winchester and Jane Ellen Hope in Baltimore, Maryland. His siblings include: Ann Rebecca Winchester (1835-1864) who married Charles B. Dye; and Hannah Jane Winchester who married Thomas Gray Bennett. William married Sarah Lockwood Pardee on September 30, 1862. The couple had one known child, Annie Pardee Winchester, born June 15, 1866, who died 6 weeks later on July 25 from marasmus. William died in New Haven, Connecticut, on March 7, 1881, of tuberculosis. He was buried in Evergreen Cemetery in New Haven. After his death, his wife, Sarah, moved to Santa Clara Valley, California, and became notable for building Llanada Villa, later known as the Winchester Mystery House.

== Legacy ==
The William Wirt Winchester Hospital in West Haven, Connecticut, was established by his wife Sarah for the treatment of tuberculosis. The hospital was later sold and became a Veteran's Administration Hospital. The Private Pavilion at Yale New Haven Hospital was then renamed in his honor.

== Bibliography ==
- Ignoffo, Mary Jo (September 5, 2022). Captive of the Labyrinth: Sarah L. Winchester, Heiress to the Rifle Fortune (2nd ed.). United States of America: The Curators of the University of Missouri, University of Missouri Press. ISBN 9780826222701.

Business positions
Preceded by Oliver Winchester	President of Winchester Repeating Arms Company; 1880–1881	Succeeded by William Converse
