= Oliver Winchester =

American businessman and politician

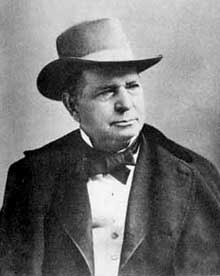
- Winchester c. 1870

52nd Lieutenant Governor of Connecticut
- In office May 2, 1866 – May 1, 1867
- Governor: Joseph Roswell Hawley
- Preceded by: Roger Averill
- Succeeded by: Ephraim H. Hyde

Personal details
- Born: Oliver Fisher Winchester; November 30, 1810 Boston, Massachusetts, U.S.
- Died: December 10, 1880 (aged 70) New Haven, Connecticut, U.S.
- Party: Republican
- Spouse: Jane Ellen Hope (m. 1834)
- Children: 3, incl. William
- Parent(s): Samuel Winchester; Hannah Bates
- Occupation: Founder, Winchester Repeating Arms Company

Oliver Fisher Winchester (November 30, 1810 – December 10, 1880) was an American businessman and politician, best known as being the founder of the Winchester Repeating Arms Company.

== Birth and marriage ==
He was the son of Samuel Winchester and Hannah Bates and was born in Boston on November 30, 1810. He married Jane Ellen Hope in Boston on February 20, 1834. Their children were:

- Ann Rebecca Winchester (1835–1864) who married Charles B. Dye
- William Wirt Winchester (1837–1881) who married Sarah Lockwood Pardee
- Hannah Jane Winchester who married Thomas Gray Bennett

== Career ==
Winchester was known for manufacturing and marketing the Winchester repeating rifle, which was a much re-designed descendant of the Volcanic rifle of some years earlier. Winchester started as a clothing manufacturer in New York City and New Haven, Connecticut. During this period he discovered that a division of Smith & Wesson firearms was failing financially with one of their newly patented arms. Having an eye for opportunity, Winchester assembled venture capital together with other stockholders and acquired the S&W division, better known as the Volcanic Repeating Arms Company, in 1855. By 1857, Winchester had positioned himself as the principal stockholder in the company and relocated to New Haven, changing the name to New Haven Arms Company.

Initially, the company was plagued by sluggish returns, which was in part attributed to the design and poor performance of the Volcanic cartridge: a hollow conical ball filled with black powder and sealed by a cork primer. Although the Volcanic's repeater design far outpaced the rival technology, the poor performance and reliability of the .25 and .32 caliber cartridges used in the pistol and rifle models respectively, was little match for the competitors' larger calibers.

Winchester had inherited an engineer, Benjamin Tyler Henry, who was an invaluable asset. Henry sought to improve on the Volcanic repeating rifle by enlarging the frame and magazine to accommodate seventeen of his newly redesigned, all-brass cased .44 caliber rimfire cartridges. This new cartridge put the new company on the map, and Henry's ingenuity was rewarded with a patent in his name on October 16, 1860, for what became the famous Henry rifle.

The Henry rifle was manufactured for almost six years with a total production of approximately 12,000 rifles, a number which included both iron and brass frame models. Following the success of the Henry rifle, the company was reorganized once more and renamed the Winchester Repeating Arms Company. In 1866, employee Nelson King's new improved patent remedied flaws in the Henry rifle by incorporating a loading gate on the side of the frame and integrating a round sealed magazine which was covered by a fore stock. The first Winchester rifle was the Model 1866 which has been nicknamed the Yellow Boy.

Repeating rifles were used to some extent in the American Civil War. However, the United States Army at that time did not use many repeating rifles as they were expensive, and too advanced for the outdated tactics used in the war. Repeating rifles were not widely used until after the war when they became increasingly popular with civilians. Military authorities concentrated primarily on perfecting breech-loading single shot rifles for many more years. With thousands of rifles in the hands of the average pioneer, the Winchester repeating rifles gained a reputation as "The Gun that Won the West".

Oliver Winchester was also active in politics, serving as a New Haven City Commissioner, Republican Presidential elector in 1864, and as Lieutenant Governor of Connecticut from 1866 to 1867.

When Winchester died on December 10, 1880, his ownership in the company passed to his son, William Wirt Winchester, who died of tuberculosis in March of the next year. William's wife, Sarah, moved to San Jose, California, where she began building a chaotic mansion now known as the Winchester Mystery House with her inheritance.

Business positions
Preceded by Founder	President of Winchester Repeating Arms Company; 1857–1880	Succeeded by William Wirt Winchester
Political offices
Preceded by Roger Averill	Lieutenant Governor of Connecticut; 1866–1867	Succeeded by Ephraim H. Hyde
