= California Pacific Medical Center =

- Sutter Health

Geography
- Location: 1101 Van Ness Avenue, San Francisco, California, U.S.
- Coordinates: 37.790632°N 122.431272°W

Organisation
- Care system: Non-Profit
- Type: Teaching Hospital
- Affiliated university: University of California, San Francisco; Dartmouth Medical School

Links
- Website: www.sutterhealth.org/cpmc
- Lists: Hospitals in U.S.

Sutter Health California Pacific Medical Center (CPMC) is a general medical/surgical and teaching hospital in San Francisco, California. It was created by a merger of some of the city's longest-established hospitals and currently operates three acute care campuses.

Its primary campuses in San Francisco are the Van Ness Campus in Cathedral Hill, the Davies Campus in Duboce Triangle, and the Mission Bernal Campus in the Mission District. While it is a privately funded entity, CPMC has strong academic ties to the University of California, San Francisco (UCSF) and Stanford University Medical Center, as well as the Geisel School of Medicine of Dartmouth College.

== Locations ==
As of 2020, CPMC operates three acute care hospitals:

- Davies Campus (Castro & Duboce Streets, formerly Franklin Hospital)
- Mission Bernal Campus (3555 Cesar Chavez Street), which opened in 2018, replacing St. Luke's
- Van Ness Campus (1101 Van Ness Ave), which opened in 2019 with 274 beds

With the opening of the Mission Bernal Campus and the Van Ness Campus, CPMC ended inpatient hospital and emergency services at its original two campuses:

- Pacific Campus (2333 Buchanan Street, originally Presbyterian Hospital)
- California Campus (3700 California Street, originally Children's Hospital)

CPMC began construction of a neuroscience facility at its Mission Bernal campus on June 4, 2025. The five-story building, budgeted at $442 million and covering 129,000 square feet, is scheduled to open in 2028. It is intended to bring the hospital's brain and nervous-system care — surgical, outpatient and diagnostic — onto one site.

== Origins ==
Sutter Health CPMC has origins in several early San Francisco medical institutions, including:

- The German Hospital - founded in 1858, was renamed Franklin Hospital during World War I and Davies Medical Center in 1968 before joining CPMC in 1998
- St. Luke's Hospital - founded in 1871, was originally located on Bernal Hill before moving to the Cesar Chavez (Army) Street location in the 1880s (sharing the site with the Bancroft Library) and merging with CPMC in 2007
- Children's Hospital - founded in 1875 as the Pacific Dispensary for Women and Children before shortening its name in 1877 and merging with Presbyterian Hospital in 1991
- Cooper Medical College - founded as an independent medical school in 1882, became Stanford's medical school in 1908, and moved to Stanford's campus in 1959
- Lane Hospital - founded in 1895 for Cooper Medical College, became Presbyterian Hospital after the medical school moved to Stanford's campus in 1959
- Hahnemann Homeopathic Hospital - founded in 1887, was renamed Marshall Hale Memorial Hospital in the 1970s before merging with Children's Hospital in the 1980s
- Garden Sullivan Hospital (1913)
- The Northern California Transplant Bank (1980)

Several of these institutions operated nursing schools (Pacific Dispensary, St. Luke's, Lane Hospital), as well as outreach clinics (e.g., St. Luke's Neighborhood Clinic, founded in 1920) during portions of their history.

== History ==
In 1991, Presbyterian Hospital (at that time known as Pacific Presbyterian Medical Center) and Children's Hospital merged, medical staffs were combined, and a large joint physician group was established in 1993. The new multiple-facility entity was named California Pacific Medical Center (CPMC). Its two sites were renamed the California Campus (the Children's site, which ran along California Street) and the Pacific Campus (the Pacific Presbyterian site).

The new hospital began its life by refusing to recognize the California Nurses Association, which had represented registered nurses at Children's Hospital since 1947. The merged hospital also struggled to reduce costs, finally succeeding when a new management team took what opponents described as "a ruthless approach."

The new CPMC inherited from Presbyterian Hospital its membership in the California HealthCare System; members also included Marin General Hospital, Alta Bates Hospital in Berkeley, and Mills-Peninsula Medical Center in San Mateo and Burlingame. This system joined with the Sutter Health System of Sacramento in 1996 to form Sutter/CHS, later renamed Sutter Health. A major project of the new company was organizing capitalization for replacement of every hospital facility, to conform to new seismic legislation underway in the California Legislature.

In 1997, the former Franklin Hospital (then known as Ralph K. Davies Medical Center) was acquired by CPMC and became its third campus. This action was motivated in part by the since-failed merger of area teaching giants Stanford Hospital and UCSF Medical Center.

In 2007, St. Luke's Hospital joined CPMC as its fourth campus. St. Luke's had joined Sutter as an independent affiliate in July 2001, after initiating and pursuing anti-trust litigation against CPMC.

In 2010, Sutter Health reorganized its hospitals and medical foundations into five regions. In 2013, CPMC and its West Bay Region partners began to implement the Epic electronic health record, as a component of the $1+ billion adoption of this system across Sutter Health. In November 2014, Sutter Health announced further regional streamlining, where the West Bay Region was combined with the East Bay Region and the Peninsula Coastal Region to become one Sutter Health Bay Area operating unit.

In 2013, CPMC began construction of a new $2.1 billion, 274-bed hospital on the site of the former Jack Tar Hotel at Van Ness and Geary (once dubbed "the box Disneyland came in"). The new Van Ness Campus was to replace both the California Campus and Pacific Campus for inpatient care. Further, the new facility came with several patient safety focused innovations, and is the first known structure in North America to use viscous wall dampers designed to absorb strong seismic activity. Van Ness Campus officially opened on March 2, 2019.

Ground was broken in September 2014 to build a 120-bed replacement hospital at St. Luke's, after years of dispute over whether CPMC would continue to operate a hospital in the Mission District. Mission Bernal Campus officially opened ahead of schedule on August 25, 2018. This new facility has maternity services staffed by certified nurse midwives and physicians that is on California's Maternity Care Honor roll, specialized acute elderly care unit, and an emergency department with Geriatric Emergency Department Accreditation (GED).

As a part of the process for getting County permission to build the new facilities, CPMC has committed to maintaining or increasing its services to the city's poor.

On June 5, 2015, surgeons at CPMC and University of California, San Francisco successfully completed 18 surgeries in the nation's first nine-way, two-day kidney transplant chain in a single city.

== Research Institute ==
CPMC hosts the California Pacific Medical Center Research Institute, which conducts basic science and clinical studies into a range of topics. Michael Rowbotham, M.D. is Senior Scientist and Scientific Director of the research institute. Research and other initiatives at CPMC's Center for Melanoma Research and Treatment have yielded five-year survival rates for metastatic melanoma that are double the national average . Clinical trials led by senior scientists David Minor, MD, and Mohammed Kashani-Sabet, MD, were key to FDA approval of nivolumab—a new breakthrough cancer therapy—for the treatment of melanoma.

== Medical education ==
CPMC is a teaching site for residents in the UCSF General Surgery, Obstetrics and Gynecology, Orthopedic Surgery, and Pediatrics programs. CPMC itself hosts residencies in Internal Medicine, Ophthalmology, and Psychiatry. In addition to these residency programs, it offers ACGME accredited fellowship positions in Cardiology, Gastroenterology, Pulmonology/Critical Care, Endocrinology, Plastic Surgery of the Hand, and Transplant Hepatology. It also offers other accredited fellowships (non-ACGME) in MRI, Neurocritical care, Microsurgery, Oculoplastic Surgery, Retina Surgery, Transplant Nephrology, and Shoulder/Upper Extremity Surgery.

Medical students from UCSF rotate through CPMC in their obstetrics/gynecology and surgery third year clerkships. In 2008, CPMC announced its new educational affiliation and partnership with Dartmouth Medical School to bring students to San Francisco for third- and fourth-year clerkships in the disciplines of Internal Medicine, Psychiatry, Obstetrics and Gynecology, Family Medicine, Pediatrics and Neurology.

== Rankings and recognitions ==
In 2024, CPMC was recognized by US News and World Report as high performing in 11 common procedures and conditions, including colon and gynecologic cancer surgery, heart attack/failure, diabetes, kidney failure, stroke, and pneumonia. The hospital was also one of 50 programs nationally ranked in gastroenterology and gastrointestinal surgery by the publication, ranking 46th out of 4,855 hospitals. In December 2023, the obstetrics department received a high performance rating in maternity care as well.

== Quality ==
The LeapFrog Group scores for the campuses as of 2023 were:

| Campus name | Grade |
|---|---|
| Mission Bernal Campus | A |
| Davies Campus | C |

== Notable deaths ==
- Josh Weston, adult film actor, died from septic shock and bacterial endocarditis, which were complications from AIDS.

== See also ==
- List of hospitals in California
- Brian Andrews, chairman of the Department of Neurosciences
