= Lucy Maria Field Wanzer =

American physician

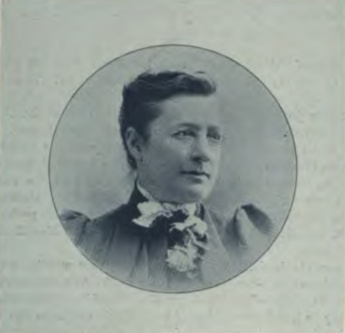
- Wanzer c. 1892
- Born: Lucy Maria Field; October 11, 1841; Wisconsin
- Died: October 13, 1930 (aged 89); San Francisco
- Education: University of California, San Francisco
- Medical career
- Profession: Doctor
- Field: Gynecology and pediatrics
- Institutions: San Francisco Children's Hospital

Lucy Maria Field Wanzer (11 October 1841 – 13 October 1930) was the first woman to be admitted to and graduate from an American medical school west of the Rocky Mountains.

== Early life ==
Wanzer was born Lucy Maria Field on October 11, 1841, in Wisconsin, living first in Milwaukee and later in Madison. Her mother had chronic health problems, leading the family to move to California in 1858. Wanzer became an elementary school teacher, and later, after being briefly married, she raised money to attend medical school by learning telegraphy and opening a telegraph office.

== Medical school and practice ==
Wanzer first applied to the Toland Medical College in San Francisco in 1873, but was rejected. In March 1873, the school was absorbed into the University of California system (eventually becoming UCSF), and Wanzer appealed her rejection to the regents of the University of California. She was admitted after a four-month appeal that set a precedent allowing other women to attend medical schools throughout the UC system. While at school, she was hazed by fellow students, and one professor told her any woman who wanted to study medicine should have their ovaries removed, to which she replied that male students should have their testicles removed. She graduated with honors in 1876.

After graduation, Wanzer was admitted to the San Francisco County Medical Society, but only after threats to "blackball" her failed. Her private practice, in a series of downtown San Francisco offices, focused on obstetrics and gynecology. In 1890, she was elected president of the University of California Medical Department Alumni Society. Wanzer was also a practicing pediatrician, and helped establish the San Francisco Children's Hospital.

Wanzer continued to practice into her 80s, and died on October 13, 1930, at the age of 89.
