= Inertia damper =

Device that counters vibration using the effects of inertia

An inertia damper is a device that counters vibration using the effects of inertia and other forces and motion. The damper does not negate the forces but either absorbs or redirects them by other means. For example, a large and heavy suspended body may be used to absorb several short-duration large forces, and to reapply those forces as a smaller force over a longer period.

== Real-world applications and devices ==
Inertial compensators are also used in simulators or rides, making them more realistic by creating artificial sensations of acceleration and other movement. The Disneyland ride "Star Tours: The Adventure Continues" is a fair example of this principle.

There are many types of physical devices that can act as inertia dampers:

- Stockbridge damper - absorbs resonant wave motions in wire and support cables, seen on high voltage power lines.
- Seismic base isolation - Seismic insulators are large weights which are installed in the tops of high rise buildings which may be affected by earthquakes. These weights which may be hundreds of tons are attached the tower block structures by cables or rubber blocks. This allows the weights to move relative to the tower block when it is being shaken by earthquakes, this relative movement dissipates some of the earthquake energy and reduces the amount the building will shake.
- Inerter (mechanical networks) A mechanical analog to an electrical capacitor.
- engine crankshaft damper - a flywheel type mass attached to an engine crankshaft via rubber, viscous fluid or a friction device which allow relative movement between the crankshaft and the mass, this relative movement converts the kinetic vibration energy into heat which reduces the peak torsional loads on the crankshaft.
- Dual-mass flywheel Much like a crankshaft damper, the flywheel mass is isolated torsionally from the crankshaft etc mass via springs or other compliance to reduce peak torsional loads
- Wilmot Breedon harmonic bumper - A type of chassis torsional vibration absorbing bumper fitted to some cars in the 1930s. It had heavy weights incorporated in the ends and was attached to the car chassis via a flexible leaf spring which allowed the bumper weights to move vertically and torsionally relative to the cars body/chassis unit and so helped reduce body vibration and axle tramp.

== See also ==
- Classical mechanics – Description of large objects' physics
- Kinematics – Branch of physics describing the motion of objects without considering forces
- List of moments of inertia – Moment of inertia of diff geometric shapes
