= List of fictional presidents of the United States (G–H) =

Lists of fictional presidents of the United States
A–B	C–D	E–F
G–H	I–J	K–M
N–R	S–T	U–Z
Fictional presidencies of historical figures
A–B	C–D	E–G
H–J	K–L	M–O
P–R	S–U	V–Z

The following is a list of fictional presidents of the United States, G through H.

== G ==
=== President Judy Gagwell ===
- President in Stop! That! Train!
- Played by: RuPaul Charles

=== President Joseph K Galbrain ===
- President in XIII (comics) and XIII: The Conspiracy
- In the comic and video game edition, Galbrain succeeds to the Presidency following the assassination of the popular President William Sheridan. The assassination prompts Sheridan's younger brother, Walter, to announce he is running for office at the next election against Galbrain.
- During Galbrain's term, a group of powerful people in the United States, calling themselves "The XX" ("The Twenty"), planned a coup during a war simulation exercise, using loyal SPADS soldiers, to replace US democracy with a totalitarian government.
- Unbeknownst to Galbrain, his close advisor and Secretary of Defense Calvin Wax was a senior leader of the plot, as was Walter Sheridan. Under Walter's orders, Wax convinced Galbrain to delay declaring a national emergency upon learning of the plot.
- Later, SPADS soldiers attack a military site Galbrain visits, with his life being saved by XIII, the man accused of William Sheridan's murder. However, the stress of the near assassination results in Galbrain resigning and dropping out of the race, clearing Walter's path to office.
- In the TV adaptation, Galbrain is sworn into office in November 2007 following the assassination of President Sally Sheridan during a Veteran's Day speech. Over the following few months, the US is plagued by a series of terrorist attacks and continued inability to find Sheridan's killer.
- Due to his administration's perceived inaction, Galbrain is challenged for re-election by Wally Sheridan, the Republican Governor of North Carolina and Sally's brother from the opposite party. Ahead of the 2008 presidential election, Galbrain is trailing in the polls.
- Unbeknownst to Galbrain, his Chief of Staff Calvin Wax, Defense Secretary Ellery Shipley and Wally Sheridan himself are co-conspirators in a plot to stage a de facto coup in the US. Together with their allies in business, media, the military and intelligence, they planned to detonate a dirty bomb on Election Day to ensure Sheridan's election and justify the use of draconian, authoritarian powers.
- The plot is defeated thanks to the efforts of XIII and his allies, NSA Agent Jones and General Carrington. In the aftermath, Wax and Shipley commit suicide whilst a majority of the conspirators are arrested. Sheridan is unexposed, however, and defeats Galbrain in the election. After proving his innocence to investigators, Galbrain resigns from office in November 2008 at Sheridan's request, with the Speaker of the House serving as acting president until Sheridan's inauguration in January 2009.
- Party: Democratic
- Played by: John Bourgeois in XIII: The Conspiracy

=== President Gamberelli ===
- President in: We Who Survived (1959) by Sterling Noel
- President in 2203–04
- Disbelieves prediction of world catastrophe.
- Presumed dead.

=== President Paul Garcetti ===
- President in: Political Animals
- A US Senator, he defeats former First Lady and governor of Illinois, Elaine Barrish Hammond for the Democratic nomination and upon his election, he names Barrish as Secretary of State although relations between them worsen due to disagreements over foreign policy
- In office, Garcetti listens more to the counsel of his amoral vice president Fred Collier and chief of staff Barry Harris. However, he akes Secretary Barrish's advice when a Chinese submarine is downed off the Los Angeles coast by launching a successful rescue operation
- After the Chinese rescue, Garcetti refuses to accept Barrish's resignation so she can run for president against him in the Democratic primaries and he offers the Vice Presidency to her at the next election which Barrish is poised to accept. Before Barrish can accept the vice-presidential spot on the ticket, President Garcetti is lost and presumed killed when Air Force One crashes into the Atlantic Ocean off the coast of France. This leaves Vice President Collier as the new acting president. Garcetti's corpse is found in the wreckage, which makes Collier the president.
- Term: January 2009 – July 2011
- Party: Democratic
- Played by: Adrian Pasdar

=== President Jules Gardiner ===
- President in The Squadron Supreme, a Marvel Comics mini-series.
- Former U.S. postmaster general.
- Serves as president after the alien Overmind forces former president Kyle Richmond to conquer the World.

=== President Chauncey Gardiner ===
- The simple-minded gardener, becomes a TV celebrity by a series of coincidences. He appears at the end of Jerzy Kosinski's book "Being There" (and the film made based on it) selected as the next president by a cabal of powerful business people. The implication is that once they select him, his actual election to the office is a foregone conclusion.

=== President Hal Gardner ===
- Served from 2007 to 2009
- 47th President in 24
- Party: Republican
- Vice President under Charles Logan from 2006–2007 until Logan resigns after being arrested for involvement in David Palmer's assassination in Day 5.
- Serves out the remainder of Logan's term, but is unsuccessful in securing a full four-year term in the 2008 presidential election to Democrat Wayne Palmer.
- Previously served as United States senator from Kentucky, governor of Kentucky, and Kentucky secretary of state.
- Played by: Ray Wise

=== President Frederick Randolph Garner ===
- President in: Lois & Clark: The New Adventures of Superman episodes "Meet John Doe", "I Now Pronounce You..." and "Lois and Clarks"
- His first and middle names can be seen on a paper he is signing in "I Now Pronounce you . . .", and his last name is used in "Meet John Doe."
- Played by: Fred Willard

=== President Thomas Edison (Shy) Garland ===
- President in: Father's Day, novel by John Calvin Batchelor
- Former astronaut, former senator from Texas, nicknamed Shy and a nephew of Lyndon B. Johnson.
- Elected vice president under Theodore G. Jay in 2000, assumes the reins of power as acting president, as per the 25th Amendment, after Jay goes on a leave of absence due to a deep depression. Garland is much more popular than President Jay and attempts to have Jay ruled unfit by Congress and the Cabinet when Jay tries to reassume the presidency. He also orchestrates a military coup to assassinate Jay if the attempt to have him declared unfit fails. Codenamed "Father's Day"?
- Party: Democratic

=== President Jesse Garrety ===
- President in: Shadowrun Role-Playing Game
- Serves two consecutive terms: 2009–2013 and 2013–2016
- 45th US President
- Defeats incumbent Philip Bester in the 2008 election.
- Vice President William Jarman replaces him after Garrety's assassination December 12, 2016.

=== President Herbert Garrison ===
- President in: South Park
- After protesting the growing presence of Canadian refugees in South Park fleeing from the populist, vulgar Donald-Trump-esque President of Canada, demanding that a border wall be built to keep out Canadian immigrants (which the Canadians already built to keep Americans out of Canada), and raping the president of Canada to death, Garrison launched a presidential campaign.
- Despite attempting to sabotage his own campaign to avoid humiliation in failing to fulfil his campaign promises (simply expressed as raping to death his and America's perceived enemies), he defeats Hillary Clinton in the 2016 election. He loses the popular vote, but wins the Electoral College vote by 306 to 232.
- Caitlyn Jenner serves as his running mate. However, Mike Pence is later seen serving as vice president.
- After Kyle Broflovski and the pressure group Millennials Against Canada protest the Netflix revival of Terrance and Phillip, worsening American-Canadian relations culminate in Garrison launching a nuclear strike against Toronto.
- He deliberately mishandles the COVID-19 pandemic to fulfill his racist campaign promises (as ethnic minorities suffered disproportionately higher fatalities), even incinerating a pangolin which may have been the key to creating a vaccine.
- Apparently having lost the 2020 election to Joe Biden, he returns to his old teaching job. However, a large number of children are pulled out of South Park Elementary either because their parents hate him or are loyal QAnon supporters who misinterpret his demands for them to stop accosting him as a coded message to spread conspiracy theories by becoming private tutors. While on vacation to Myrtle Beach, South Carolina with his boyfriend Rick, Garrison is tempted into attending MAGA rallies, readopting his presidential persona, but begs Rick to take him back during an election speech, saying that he needs someone to be accountable to (resulting in his followers storming the Capitol whilst chanting "I love Rick").
- 45th US President
- Party: Republican
- A parody of and surrogate for Donald Trump. However, in "Sermon on the 'Mount", Trump is depicted as the incumbent president, with his administration's actions leading the citizens of South Park to mistakenly believe that Garrison is president again and break down his door to confront him.
- Gender: Male (although was briefly a transgender woman)

=== President Kelly Geller ===
- President in The Last Ship (TV series) (Motion Book and Season 1)
- First female president.
- Former Speaker of the House of Representatives, who is elevated to the role of president after he and the vice president succumb to the Red Flu months before.
- Contacts the USS Nathan James after months of radio silence during the ship's mission in the Arctic, and orders them to return to the United States if Dr. Rachel Scott has managed to synthesize a cure to the Red Flu.
- Invites the remaining officials from the United States Government into the bunker beneath the White House to escape the Red Flu pandemic. However, the bunker later becomes compromised and infected.
- Presumed to have died of either infection or starvation in the locked down White House bunker, which is found to be impenetrable by sailors from the USS Nathan James when they explore the building in Season 2.
- Played by Deborah May.

=== President Johnny Gentle ===
- President in: Infinite Jest, novel by David Foster Wallace
- Has an obsessive-compulsive phobia of contamination; founder of the "Clean U.S. Party"
- A former "famous crooner", he wins the presidency on a promise to make America a cleaner place. As part of his solution he makes a large portion of New England (the "Concavity") into a toxic waste dump and forcibly gives this territory to Canada.

=== President Standrich Dale Gilchrist ===
- President in: 1600 Penn
- Former Congressman and Governor of Nevada
- Attended the US Naval Academy and served in Operation Desert Storm
- Widower; his second wife Emily Nash Gilchrist was his campaign manager for the governorship
- His brother Doug owns/operates the Las Vegas Convention Center
- Has four children: sons Skip and Xander, daughters Becca and Marigold
- Played by: Bill Pullman, who joked in promotional material that this is his second term

=== President Mays Gilliam ===
- President in: Head of State
- An alderman from Washington D.C., Gilliam is chosen by his party to replace the deceased presidential nominee. Gilliam narrowly defeats a sitting vice-president becoming America's first Black President.
- Played by: Chris Rock
- Party: Democrat

=== President Lancelot R. Gilligrass ===
- President in: Charlie and the Great Glass Elevator
- Presides over the construction of a "Space Hotel" orbiting the earth; when Willy Wonka and Charlie Bucket's family board the hotel, he mistakes them for Martians.
- Vice president is Elvira Tibbs, his eighty-nine years old former nanny, who is the power behind the throne and said to be as strict with the president as when he was a little boy.
- Well known for his inventions.
- His best friend is a sword-swallower from Afghanistan, who attends cabinet meetings though having no official position.
- His famous cat is Mrs Taubsypuss.

=== President Harold Goosie ===
- President in: Black No More
- Member of the Republican party

=== President Leona Crawford Gordon ===
- President in "Hitler's Daughter" (1984) by Timothy Benford.
- Vice President to President Virgil Rutledge until his untimely death.
- Mother is a woman impregnated by Hitler, brought to the United States in 1945 by U-Boat, and is killed shortly after giving birth to her.

=== President Ben Gorman ===
- President in the sci-fi thriller Vacuum by German author Phillp P. Peterson
- Last president of the United States before the earth, along with the entire universe is destroyed because of Vacuum fluctuation
- Oversees the construction of a gigantic, light-speed space-arc, that should save some remaining factions of humanity
- Enforces martial law, starts a nuclear war with North Korea and lies to the people about the chances for normal civilians to get a ticket for the arc
- Is killed by hordes of angry rioters on the launch site of the ship in Nevada, who tried to get on the ship before it leaves

=== President Noah Grace ===
- President In: Resistance: Fall of Man
- Former Junior Senator of Montana, staunch supporter of America's pro-isolationist policies as instituted by real-life Senator Robert A. Taft; defeats Democratic President Franklin Delano Roosevelt for the presidency in the 1940 presidential election.
- Elected to third term in office in 1948.
- President from 1941 to 1951.
- Institutes a totalitarian regime over the United States; frequently suppresses freedom of speech and freedom of the press.
- Leads the United States during the global invasion by the alien Chimera; spearheads a massive buildup of American military power to defend the mainland in preparation for an eventual invasion; orders the liberation of the United Kingdom from the Chimera in 1951.
- Attempts to negotiate the surrendering of the rest of the world to the Chimera in exchange for America's safety.
- U.S. soldier Nathan Hale assassinates him on December 25, 1951, for treason.
- His vice president, Harvey McCullen succeeds him
- Party: Republican.

=== President Graham ===
- President in: Resident Evil 4
- Daughter, Ashley Graham, is kidnapped by the Spanish Cult Los Illuminados in 2004.
- Never shown during the course of the game, though he is the one to send Leon S. Kennedy to rescue his daughter.
- Unknown political orientation, though in-game references to terrorism suggest that he might be similar to President George W. Bush in regards to foreign affairs.
- Given name not mentioned. Surname inferred.

=== President Fitzgerald Thomas Grant III ===
- President in Scandal, an ABC Television Series from Season 1–6.
- Serves his presidential term from 2009 to 2017.
- Former governor of California.
- Part of a political dynasty as his father, Fitzgerald Grant II, is a two-term governor of California and a four-term senator.
- Yale graduate, Rhodes Scholar, PhD. Joins the US Navy and becomes a fighter pilot, seeing action in the Gulf War. Studies Law at Harvard, where he is classmates with his future wife, Mellie.
- Narrowly defeats Democratic challenger Samuel Reston in the 2008 presidential election, although this is primarily through election fraud in Defiance County, Ohio (which he is unaware of until late into his first term).
- A Republican, he surprises his party by reaching across the aisle during his second term in office, appointing Democrats to his cabinet and taking on issues such as immigration reform [the DREAM Act], Education reform and Equal Pay and successfully passing a gun control bill, completely antagonizing the Republican base. As the death of his son, Fitzgerald Thomas 'Jerry Jr.' Grant IV, helps him win re-election due to public sympathy, these actions may be Grant's attempts either to self-justify his second term or to honour the memory of his son (a Democrat who supported Samuel Reston's 2012 candidacy).
- Has three vice presidents during his term – Sally Langston, who covets the presidency, even challenging him unsuccessfully as an independent in the 2012 presidential election; Andrew Nichols, who covertly tries to have Grant killed; and finally Susan Ross, a former senator from Virginia appointed primarily for the purpose of Mellie Grant obtaining a Senate seat and being unchallenged for the Republican presidential nomination in 2016.
- His administration has three Chiefs of Staff over eight years with Cyrus Beene, Elizabeth North and Abby Whelan; as well as six press secretaries, two of whom are killed via gunfire.
- Attempts to divorce his wife and move in his mistress, crisis and public relations manager Olivia Pope, whilst in office. His divorce occurs in the middle of his second term, by which time Mellie is a U.S. senator from Virginia, replacing newly confirmed Vice President Ross.
- Foreign policy issues during his tenure involve the [fictitious] countries of "Kashfar", "East Sudan" and "West Angola".
- On the domestic front, he encounters inter alia, an assassination attempt, Clinton-esque sex scandals, a secret CIA Black Ops group on US soil, terrorist attacks, a coup d'état and a diabolical chief of staff.
- Political Party Affiliation: Republican
- Succeeded in January 2017 by Senator Mellie Grant, his ex-wife.
- In addition to Jerry Jr., Grant also has a daughter, Karen, who starts acting out at school and engaging in drunken sex following the death of her brother, and another son, Theodore Wallace 'Teddy' Grant, conceived only to exonerate Grant from a damaging sex scandal after an audio recording is made of him and Olivia Pope.
- Played by Tony Goldwyn

=== President Mellie Grant ===
- President in Scandal, an ABC Television Series from Season 6-present.
- Serving her presidential term from 2017 to present.
- Former first lady of California and first lady of the United States as the wife of Fitzgerald Grant. After a contentious marriage that results in several infidelities on Fitz's part, the Grants divorce during the fifth year of Fitzgerald's presidency.
- When Grant is rendered comatose following an assassination attempt and Vice President Sally Langston becomes acting president, she forges Grant's signature on a letter ending invocation whilst he is still comatose. Between then and Grant's eventual recovery, she may well have exercised presidential powers, paralleling Edith Wilson's 'stewardship' following her husband Woodrow's stroke.
- After the death of her son Fitzgerald Thomas 'Jerry Jr' Grant IV (whom she originally thought was conceived as a result of being raped by Fitz's father, Fitzgerald Thomas Grant II), she enters a period of mourning which alienates her from her surviving children, Karen and Theodore, generates press speculation about her mental health, and leads to humiliation after requisitioning federal government resources to solve a much publicised open-and-shut case involving the deaths of two hikers.
- Former US senator from Virginia from November 2013 to January 2017. Although former vice president and conservative talk-show host Sally Langston questions the constitutionality of a first lady holding elected office, that fact likely helps to get her elected.
- A Harvard Law graduate where she came top of her class, practicing for a period as a highly skilled corporate lawyer before giving up her career to support her husband's political ambitions.
- Launches a campaign for the 2016 Republican presidential nomination, eventually defeating Vice President Susan Ross and business tycoon Hollis Doyle for the nomination. She selects NSA Director Jake Ballard as her running mate.
- Loses the 2016 presidential election by an exceptionally narrow margin electorally to Democratic nominee Pennsylvania governor Francisco Vargas, while carrying the popular vote; Vargas' assassination on Election Night throws the presidency into contention due to the constitutional amendments allowing electors to vote for their preferred candidates.
- Lobbying from Grant's team as well as revelations and pressures surrounding Democratic vice presidential nominee, former White House chief of staff Cyrus Beene, leads to Grant winning the Congressional vote for the Presidency.
- Grant selects Luna Vargas, a Democrat and Francisco's widow, as her vice presidential choice to unify the nation after Jake Ballard resigns as vice president-elect. Grant's team are unaware though that Luna Vargas has supposedly masterminded Francisco's assassination and is similarly planning an assassination against Mellie.
- Luna Vargas' role is exposed and she is covertly murdered on Inauguration Night, though the whole plot is actually the brainchild of Beene.
- Administration officials include Vice President Cyrus Beene and White House Chief of Staff Olivia Pope, who is later replaced by Jake Ballard.
- It is suggested that she is elected to a second term in the 2020 presidential election in the final scene of the finale as she is seen signing a Gun Control bill in 2021. And if she is to finish out the term, she will seal the Republican Party's grip on the White House for 24 years.
- Political Party: Republican
- Played by Bellamy Young

=== President Phil Graves ===
- President in: Hemet, or the Landlady Don't Drink Tea
- Played by Mark Allyn

=== President Richard Graves ===
- President in the EPIX TV Show Graves
- Two Term President who serves from 1993 to 2001.
- Former governor of New Mexico.
- Wife Margaret is considering a run for the U.S. Senate.
- Daughter Olivia recently separated from her congressman Husband.
- Son is a Soldier.
- Party: Republican
- Played by Nick Nolte

=== President James Graydon ===
- President in The Agency CBS TV series
- Former president who serves one term.
- After leaving office opposed CIA operations in South East Asia.
- Played by Brian Dennehy

=== President Charles Grayson ===
- President in the CW TV Series Nikita
- Played by Cameron Daddo

=== President Paul Green ===
- President in: Fire, a novel by Alan Rodgers
- His wife, Ada, is killed after a plane crash and a series of medical mishaps while visiting the Soviet Union.
- Belongs to a church called the Armageddonists, which believes man is destined to user in the end of the world.
- During a virus-caused crisis, is killed by an Air Force serviceman before he can make good his threats.

=== President Paul L. Greene ===
- President in "The Last Debate" by Jim Lehrer.
- A former governor of Nebraska, won the 2000 election after his opponent was questioned about unethical behavior during the last presidential debate.
- It was revealed after the election that President Greene leaked the information to the journalist before the debate through a third party.
- Party: Democratic.

=== President Pauline Greene ===
- President in Never, a novel by Ken Follett
- first female US president
- in the story, President Green has to prevent a looming escalation of global nuclear conflict while at the same time dealing with personal issues with her daughter
- she ends up failing to find a peaceful, diplomatic solution to the crisis and agrees to launch several nuclear strikes against China, plunging the world into World War Three and killing millions along the way

=== President William Grey ===
- President in Independence Day: Crucible, tie-in novel bridging Independence Day and Independence Day: Resurgence
- Former U.S. Marine Corps General who commands U.S. Space Command during the War of 1996.
- Elected and serves as the 43rd President of the United States from 2001 to 2005, defeating former United States Secretary of Defense Nimziki; succeeded by Lucas Jacobs
- Widower; his wife was named Amelia
- Played by Robert Loggia in Independence Day

=== President Grimes ===
- President in The Terminal List
- His Secretary of Defense Lorraine Hartley conspires with private pharmaceutical company Nubellum and senior members of WARCOM to illegally test an experimental nootropic drug on members of SEAL Team 7 Alpha Platoon.
- Instead of preventing development of PTSD as intended, the drug instead caused fatal brain tumors. Hartley and WARCOM later send Alpha Platoon on a doomed mission in Syria, which kills the majority of them, to cover up their actions.
- Hartley later commits suicide after being confronted by Lieutenant Commander James Reece, the sole survivor of Alpha Platoon, whose extrajudicial killings of those involved in the conspiracy has the Grimes administration label him a domestic terrorist.
- During Grimes tenure, the United States also has to deal with the resurgence of Al-Qaeda under the technologically focused leadership of Amin Al-Nawaz. The group carries out several attacks across Europe, including killing U.S. Army General Thompson, the NATO Supreme Allied Commander Europe in Brussels.
- The Grimes administration, with the assistance of oligarch Vasili Andrenov, later negotiates a treaty to end the Russo-Ukrainian war with Russian President Drozdov and Ukrainian President Andrushko. The agreement would return control of Crimea to Ukraine, end his administrations sanctions against Russia, and open up a timeline for Ukraine's ascencion into the EU.
- However, Grimes has to be evacuated from the signing ceremony in Odesa by the Secret Service after Drozdov is assassinated by an influential ultranationalist crime syndicate, who oppose the treaty and wish to install his replacement via a coup d'etat.
- Later grants a full presidential pardon to James Reece for his actions taken against the government to avenge his platoon after he assists them in both bringing down Al-Nawaz and preventing further loss of life during the Odesa summit attack.
- Portrayed by: Sebastian Spence

=== President Joe Grozen ===
- President in the short story "Welcome" by Poul Anderson
- In 2497, President Grozen has already been long in office. Though the country is still officially called "A Republic", the meaning of the term republic has long been forgotten. The presidency had become hereditary centuries before, Joe Grozen being descended from a long dynasty of earlier Grozen Presidents. Monogamy having been dispensed with, the president can and does have as many wives as he wants. To ensure an orderly succession, the law stipulates that the President's oldest son by his Chief Orthowife would be his heir. Rozh Grozen, President Grozen's designated heir, is a brilliant young man, studying hard to prepare himself for assuming the presidency on his father's death - though, barring accidents, this would still be far in the future. Such ideas as Democracy or Human and Civil Rights having long since totally disappeared; all the American population except a tiny elite at the top are reduced (regardless of skin color) to the status of chattel slavery. Slaves, going around with shaved heads and wearing drab grey clothing, have no rights and may be tortured or killed at their owner's complete discretion. Since there is enormous overpopulation, the US population exceeds a billion (fifteen billion worldwide), slaves are completely expendable. President Grozen and his associates see nothing wrong with cannibalism, regularly consuming the flesh of "redundant" slaves, well-cooked by the presidential gourmet cooks. For presidential banquets, it is customary to cook whole a slave baby, "Suckling Coolie" being a specially appreciated dish. In daily life, President Grozen is a genial and easy going man, a loving and doting father to his sons and daughters. Though in practice an Absolute Monarch wielding more power than Louis XIV or any other historical monarch did, Joe Grozen does not stand on ceremony and likes his friends and associates to address him simply as "Joe". It would never occur to him that there is anything wrong in his dominating the mass of slaves, as a rancher would not feel his domination of cattle was wrong.

== H ==
=== President Claire Haas ===
- President in: Quantico
- Former Vice President of the United States under President Todd.
- Previously served as a US Senator and FBI agent.
- Takes office after the resignation of President Todd, who steps down after his wife, First Lady Elaine Todd, is murdered during a hostage crisis at the G20 Summit in New York City. Todd opts to resign in favor of Haas due to his mental anguish impeding his ability to effectively lead the nation.
- When information is revealed that Haas is inadvertently responsible for forming what would later become a rogue element of the CIA responsible for the attack during her time as a senator, and also illegally creates a government task force to investigate it, her resignation is demanded.
- Not wanting the nation to have to deal with another scandal, Haas resigns the presidency after only three months in office. As no vice president has yet been confirmed, she is succeeded by her enemy, speaker of the House Henry Roarke.
- Party: Democratic
- Played by: Marcia Cross
- First female President to hold the office.

=== President Kyle Haeffner ===
- President in: Shadowrun role-playing game
- Serves 2057–2064
- 8th UCAS President | 54th US President
- Killed after being kidnapped by terrorists.
- Preceded by President Dunkelzahn
- Succeeded by VP Nadja Daviar.

=== President Richard Hagan ===
- President in Season 3 of the Netflix action thriller series The Night Agent
- An isolationist, he previously served in the United States Army as a Staff Sergeant, and was then elected a member of the Kansas House of Representatives before becoming the Governor of Kansas.
- Obtains his party's nomination after the more moderate incumbent President, Michelle Travers, declines to run for re-election.
- During his time as a Representative, he develops a relationship with intelligence broker Jacob Monroe. When running for President, he uses Monroe to obtain kompromat on his opponent, former CIA Director Patrick Knox. This involves blackmailing FBI agent Peter Sutherland to break into the UN Headquarters to steal an audio recording.
- The material reveals that Knox sold deposed dictator Viktor Bala an illegal blister agent during his time at the CIA. This causes Knox to drop out of the race when it is leaked, which guarantees Hagan the presidency.
- Is in office when Flight Pima 12 is shot down over Venezuela, killing 157 Americans on board. He blames terrorist group La Fuerza de La Soberanía (LFS) and its leader Raul Zapata, and later terminates Zapata with a drone strike.
- During his presidential campaign, and unknown to him, his wife illegally launders a $6 million campaign donation from Monroe through her charity, in exchange for providing Monroe with the Presidential Daily Briefing when Hagan is elected. Upon discovering this, he initiates a cover up and tries to have several government operatives killed to protect his wife.
- Hagan pardons himself and Jenny before resigning ahead of being impeached by the Senate.
- His administration includes Press Secretary Renee, Deputy Press Secretary Theo Miller, Secret Service Director Trent Patterson and Chairman of the Joint Chiefs of Staff General Hopkins.
- Married to First Lady Jenny Hagan and has four children; Chase, Ginger, Emma and Sadie.
- Political Party: Unspecified (implied to be a conservative Republican)
- Portrayed by: Ward Horton

=== President Mike Hagerty ===
- President in the 1980 novel Small World by Tabitha King
- Serves one term from 1953 to 1957
- Has a 12-year-old daughter named Dolly.
- Dies in 1976.

=== President Dewey Haik ===
- President in the Fascist Corps running the United States in Sinclair Lewis's novel It Can't Happen Here.
- Serves as commissioner of the Northeastern Province under President Buzz Windrip, then secretary of war and high marshal of the Minute Men.
- Collaborates in the coup d'état that removes Windrip and installs Lee Sarason as president. Shortly afterwards, Haik leads a palace coup against Sarason, assassinating him and installing himself as president.
- Particularly brutal and repressive, Haik's rule makes citizens "long for the liberal days of President Windrip".
- Launches an unprovoked war against Mexico to promote national unity.
- Later in Haik's administration, a major revolt develops against his rule, with significant defection of military forces. The final fate of this revolt and President Haik remains unknown as of the novel's end.

=== President Jeremy Haines ===
- President in: The President's Plane Is Missing and its sequel Air Force One is Haunted by Robert Serling.
- Widower
- 57 at the time of the novel.
- Former governor of a midwestern state.
- Fakes a cross-country trip in Air Force One in order to negotiate a mutual defense treaty against the People's Republic of China with the premier of the Soviet Union, and is forced to remain in hiding after the crash in order to complete the talks.
- Later claims to have seen the ghost of Franklin D. Roosevelt aboard the new Air Force One.
- Party: Republican
- Played by: Tod Andrews in the film based on the novel

=== President Emerson Hale ===
- President in the play "The White House Murder Case" by Jules Feiffer
- During his administration there is a chemical attack on U.S. troops fighting in South America.
- The U.S. has recently ended a war in Africa that cost a quarter of a million lives.
- The first lady is killed by the postmaster general with a golf club, but the president bows to political blackmail and appoints him secretary of state.

=== President Archie Hall ===
- President in the 1961 movie The Last Time I Saw Archie
- Serves in the U.S. Army Air Force during World War Two.
- A former movie studio head, he is governor of California when he announces he is running for president.
- Played by Robert Mitchum

=== President Charles Halsey ===
- President in: The Outer Limits episode "Trial by Fire"
- Shortly after being sworn in, President Halsey is faced with first contact with an armada of alien ships. As the planet arms nuclear weapons, Halsey attempts to communicate with the ships but is unsuccessful.
- Halsey is married to Elizabeth Halsey, has children and is considered a peace-loving liberal surrounded by hawkish military leaders; President Halsey and advisors are later killed by the aliens.
- Played by: Robert Foxworth

=== President Anna Hamilton ===
- President in: Travelers episode "2C1"
- Serves as the 53rd President in the mid to late 21st century.
- Considered a significant figure in 21st century history, in the original timeline Hamilton lost her election by a narrow margin. According to Grant McLaren, "another old white guy" was originally the 53rd President. She is elected in a new timeline as a side-effect of Traveler teams operating in 2017.
- An 8-year-old child in 2017, an underground group of Travelers known as the Faction attempts to assassinate her before she can rise to prominence. Another team of Travelers are assigned to protect her until the Faction are wiped out.
- Party: Unknown
- Played by: Elle McKinnon

=== President David Hamilton ===
- President in: Ace Combat: Assault Horizon
- Serves as President during the New Russian Federation Uprising.
- Played by: James Horan

=== President Eleanor Hamilton ===
- President in: No Men Beyond This Point
- In the alternate timeline of the film, women gained the ability to reproduce parthenogenecally in 1953, with male leaders worldwide ignoring claims of "fatherless pregnancies" and accusing women of lying, leading to rioting and walkouts by women. Hamilton was elected as the first female president in 1964 after the global population became two-thirds female.
- In 1967, her administration introduced the Worker Replacement Program, also called the "weeding out technique", whereby men in powerful positions had to be evaluated to see if they were actually qualified for their roles. As a result, hundreds of men lost their jobs and became homeless, with many opting to live in the countryside.
- Hamilton was presumably the last president of the United States due to the creation of a world state under the leadership of the World's Governing Council sometime in the mid-1970s. The WGC would abolish all military forces and space programs, invest in environmental protection and cures for diseases including the common cold and cancer, establish reserves for the surviving male population, and mandate asexuality.
- Party: Unknown

=== President George Hamilton ===
- President in C.L. Moore's Greater Than Gods (1939)
- In one of the story's alternate futures, he is a dictatorial president in the 23rd Century.
- A charismatic general and military leader, Hamilton is elected president and then re-elected again and again to multiple terms spanning decades. President Hamilton believes in the subjugation of the many to the State, and dreams of a United World in which all races live in blind obedience and willing sacrifice for the common good. To further that aim, he makes the United States into a nation of soldiers, families being rewarded for producing many boys, using the Cory System of genetic manipulation which produces male babies who are conditioned from birth to accept and blindly obey authority. President Hamilton then embarks on the Great War aimed at unifying the world by force. He does not see its end, dying in a bombing raid on Washington D.C. and gasps out his last words: "Go on – unify the world!" while half the US lies in smoking ruins. He is succeeded by his vice president and second in command Philip Spaulding who completes the conquest and unification of the world. The title of "President" is than changed to "Leader" and the formality of elections is dispensed with.

=== President Wesley Hamlin ===
- President in: Moonfall by Jack McDevitt
- Was governor of Illinois who won the 2000 presidential election.
- Is a distant relative of former Vice President Hannibal Hamlin.
- Narrowly survives an assassination attempt in 2003 by the father of a victim of a convicted killer he pardons as governor. President Hamlin is left paralyzed from the waist down after his assassination attempt. Vice President Dan Sullivan and Secretary of State Bernie Phillips convince him not to resign.
- Re-elected in 2004.
- Opens his presidential library in 2011.
- Moves back to his home town in Illinois after leaving office.
- Party: Republican

=== President Stuart Hammel ===
- President in "Majority Rule", a 1992 TV Movie.
- President Hammel leads the country during a war in the Middle East, but loses re-election to General Katherine Taylor in one of the closest Presidential Elections in history.
- played by Robin Gammell

=== President Alvin Hammond ===
- President in: White House Down
- Former Vice President of the United States under President James Sawyer.
- Set to resign in protest of Sawyer's controversially proposed peace treaty to remove all American military from the Middle East.
- Evacuates onto Air Force One when domestic terrorists bomb the United States Capitol and occupy The White House.
- Briefly sworn in as the 47th president of the United States when President Sawyer is assumed to have been killed in an explosion at the occupied White House.
- Killed when Air Force One is shot down by compromised NORAD missiles accessed by the terrorists from the Presidential Emergency Operations Center.
- Party: Democratic
- Played by: Michael Murphy

=== President Donald "Bud" Hammond ===
- President in: Political Animals TV Mini-Series
- Is in office around the same time as Bill Clinton, however after what could be described as the 2008 presidential election is divorced by his wife.
- Later is brought back into the spotlight by his ex-wife the secretary of state to secure the release of three American hostages in Iran.
- Served previously as Governor of North Carolina.
- First Gentleman of Illinois while his ex-wife is Governor.
- Democrat
- Played by: Ciarán Hinds

=== President William "Bill" Haney ===
- President in: My Fellow Americans
- A rising star of the Republican Party, Haney is elected as Vice President in 1988 as the running mate of Senator Russell P. Kramer of Ohio. The pair go on to be defeated for re-election in 1992 by the Democratic ticket, headed by Governor Matt Douglas of Indiana.
- Four years later, Haney wins the Republican nomination and defeats Douglas by a landslide in the general election. As part of this, Haney selects Ted Matthews as his Vice President. Matthews is widely decried in Washington as an idiot.
- Nearly three years into his term, Haney is confronted by a scandal from his time as Vice President, when he had accepted bribes from defence contractor Charlie Reynolds. Haney orders his chief of staff, Carl Witnaur, to frame Kramer for the scandal.
- NSA chief Colonel Tanner assassinates Reynolds and attempts to kill Kramer as well as Douglas, who had begun investigating the scandal. Kramer and Douglas go on the run together, eventually obtaining a confession from Witnaur and making it to the White House to confront Haney.
- Unable to refute the evidence, Haney is forced to resign by Kramer and Douglas. He publicly cites a fictitious heart condition as the reason for his departure.
- Unbeknownst to Haney, Matthews had been the mastermind of the events, with his idiocy being a ruse. Matthews built on Haney's attempts to frame Kramer by using Tanner as a hitman and setting up Haney for the fall. However, Kramer and Douglas secretly tape Matthews bragging about the plan, ensuring his downfall, too.
- Played by: Dan Aykroyd
- Republican

=== President Benjamin Bow Hannaford ===
- President in Drew Pearson's 1970 novel The President.
- Is a former U.S. senator who is forced to resign after allegations of corruption.
- Stages a political comeback and wins a four-way presidential race.
- Survives impeachment brought on by his handling of a chemical warfare incident.
- Inspired by Benjamin Hanford

=== President Hardin ===
- President in the 2018 video game Red Dead Redemption 2.
- Serves as president some time before the setting of the game.
- Only appears on the Prominent Americans Cigarette Card Set.
- Resembles Benjamin Harrison.
- Political party: Unknown

=== President John Harker ===
- President in the novelization of Escape from New York.
- Nicknamed "Straddler" because of his moderate views, actually is a cunning politician who plots his enemies' downfall from behind a facade of moderation.
- During World War III being fought against Russia and China, President Harker was going to reveal at the Hartford Summit of a new clean superbomb and threaten to use it unless they surrendered.
- Air Force One, under the code name David 14, is hijacked on route and President Harker is forced to eject in an escape pod the New York Federal Prison in Manhattan, and is taken hostage by the Duke.
- Played by: Donald Pleasence

=== President Andrew Jackson Harper ===
- President in The Agent from UNLESS by Cassandra Harbinger.
- Former U.S. senator from Tennessee and vice president of the United States.
- Sworn into office after President Dirk Morganthal "Duke" Cassidy is assassinated in by a supervillain in Nashville, Tennessee.
- Orders an escalation in the Southeast Asian War, but restricts the use of superhumans in the conflict.
- Gives the United Nations Law Enforcement & Security Service (UNLESS) free rein to deal with supervillains in the United States.
- Does not run for a second term claiming health reasons, but in reality he is threatened with exposure as the pawn of a criminal mastermind unless he steps down.
- Party: Liberty Party

=== President Baxter Harris ===
- President in: Scary Movie 3 and Scary Movie 4
- Bumbling president who has to cope with alien invasions (in both movies).
- First name "Baxter" revealed in the fourth film of the franchise.
- Played by: Leslie Nielsen

=== President John Henry Harris ===
- President in Allan Folsom's novel The Machiavelli Covenant
- Back cover copy says Harris is "on the run ... from his murderous Cabinet."

=== President William Carter Harris ===
- President in S.D. Weaver's series of short stories Il Presidente
- Democrat, elected during the 2016 elections, replaces unnamed democratic incumbent.
- Vice-president Elect Dana Merril is forced to quit prior to her formal swearing-in on January 20 and is replaced by Steven Mariano Capatelli (See President Steven Mariano Capatelli).
- President Harris commits suicide in the Oval Office minutes after assuming the presidency, January 20, 2017.

=== President Andrew Harrison ===
- President in Newt Gingrich and William Forstchen's book "1945"
- In the alternate history of the novel, Adolf Hitler does not declare war on the United States after Pearl Harbor. As a result, President Franklin D. Roosevelt has no pretext to take the US into the European war – much as he would like to do it. In the following years, the US concentrates its full military potential on Japan alone, achieving a complete victory by conventional means. At the same time, Roosevelt downgrades the Manhattan Project and in 1945 the US is still far from possessing a nuclear bomb. Meanwhile, Nazi Germany decisively defeats the Soviet Union and forces Britain to sign a peace recognizing German domination of Europe.
- Andrew Harrison, the junior senator from Nebraska, is surprisingly designated as heir by Roosevelt when FDR retires after winning the war against Japan (the book does not explain why Harrison is preferred over Harry Truman). Entering into office, Harrison is pragmatically ready to accept the new global status quo, Congress being in the mood of winding down military expenses after the victory over Japan. Harrison has a summit with Hitler in Reykjavík which superficially seems cordial and constructive – especially since Harrison speaks fluent German. However, in fact the Nazis are hatching nefarious plans, which are suspected only by a young officer, Lieutenant Commander James Martel – who is unable to convince his superiors in time, and who is far too junior to have any access to the president.
- The storm suddenly breaks – German commandos under Otto Skorzeny destroy the nuclear facility at Oak Ridge, Tennessee, the Germans seize the uranium mines in the Congo region, and Germany seems ahead of the US in the race to gain a nuclear bomb. German forces under Erwin Rommel launch a massive surprise invasion of Britain and London is heavily bombed; the desperate Winston Churchill tells Harrison: "This is much worse than 1940!". Moreover, the president is unaware that German intelligence has used sexual blackmail to suborn the White House chief of staff and make him an active German spy, and the Germans discover that the British are reading their codes and completely change them.
- The book ends with a cliffhanger; President Harrison faces one of the worst crises in American and world history. As of 2025, the promised sequel has yet to be published.

=== President William Harrison ===
- President in: The President by Parker Hudson
- Harrison is an extreme liberal president, who becomes a Christian while in office.

=== President Hart ===
- Referred to in short story "The Jaunt" by Stephen King.
- Mentioned in the same breath as President Lincoln, so presumably of some note.

=== President Hartfield ===
- President in the 1997 movie Most Wanted
- First Lady Bonnie Anne Hartfield is assassinated as part of a plot to murder U.S. soldiers.

=== President Spencer Harvey ===
- Presidency mentioned in: Jack & Bobby
- Notes: Resigns due to a corporate scandal

=== President Charles Haskell ===
- President in: Moonfall by Jack McDevitt
- Becomes the youngest vice president in history in the presidential election of 2020 at the age of 35.
- Becomes the nation's youngest president at the age of 39 after President Kolladner is killed in a Marine One crash.
- Wins re-election in 2024.
- Relocates the nation's capital back to Philadelphia after Washington, D.C. is destroyed by a tsunami.
- Party: Democratic

=== President Hathaway ===
- President in Monsters vs. Aliens, a 2009 animated movie.
- President Hathaway attempts to make first contact with an alien robot probe.
- After the probe goes on a rampage President Hathaway orders Monsters to fight it.
- Voiced by Stephen Colbert

=== President Benjamin Hathaway ===
- President when extraterrestrial invasion occurs in Falling Skies.
- Played by Stephen Collins

=== President Arne Eino Haugen ===
- President in: The General's President by John Dalmas
- Born April 3, 1924, in Koochiching County, Minnesota to parents of Norwegian and Finnish descent.
- Serves in the 11th Airborne Division in World War II, serving in New Guinea and the Philippines. His two brothers, Kaarlo and Martin also serve in the war, but are killed in action in Normandy and Peliliu.
- A millionaire technology entrepreneur, he starts out by attending the University of Minnesota on the GI Bill after the war, later becoming an electrical engineer and founding Duluth Technologies, which would later grow into a powerful national company.
- One of the best linguists to occupy the White House, said to be at least modestly proficient in: Russian, Spanish, Japanese, German, French, Swedish, Tagalog, Norwegian and Finnish as well as Chinese.
- Married to First Lady Lois Haugen and has one daughter, Liisa.
- After a stock market crash in 1994 sends the United States and the rest of the global community into turmoil, congress passes the Emergency Powers Act, which gives significantly greater powers to the Executive Branch, including the ability for the president to appoint a vice president without the need of congressional approval.
- Wanting to resign due to the stress of the fallout of the crash, incumbent President Kevin J. Donnelly first needs to appoint a vice president to succeed him, having forced his previous vice president to resign days before.
- Upon the recommendation of Chairman of the Joint Chiefs of Staff General Thomas M. "Jumper" Cromwell, President Donnelly appoints Haugen to the office of vice President and then immediately resigns, causing Haugen to immediately ascend to the presidency.
- During his tenure, Haugen uses the powers conferred to him under the Emergency Powers Act to enact widespread reforms and changes to the legal and political landscape of the United States. This included significant changes in the areas of business law and wages, tax, education, healthcare, intelligence gathering, space exploration and significant changes to the federal court system.
- Introduces a revolutionary new energy source, the Geogravitic Power Converter to the American and international stage, with the device having been manufactured and invented by his company Duluth Technologies. The introduction of this technology helps contribute to the United States emerging from the depression as a result of the market crash.
- In addition to the fallout from the 1994 market crash, Haugen deals with a multitude of international and domestic incidents during his five-month tenure. These include: a Soviet invasion of Iran and Iraq, civil unrest and eventual civil war between Afrikaners and the black population in apartheid South Africa and Namibia, secession demands from Muslim majority provinces within the Philippines, a coup d'etat in the Soviet Union, homegrown terrorists detonating an atomic bomb in the Chesapeake Bay, the shutting down of martial law internment camps created to house offenders of the unrest from the market crash and dangerous mortar attacks on the White House.
- Is made aware of the existence of weather manipulating Scalar Resonance energy weapon's that are in the possession of both the United States and the USSR. When the USSR engages in attacks with these weapons that trigger huge quakes in California and Seattle, Haugen orders a retaliatory assassination of the Soviet Premier and Politburo using the similar United States weaponry.
- Is able to come to a diplomatic agreement with the new, moderate Soviet leadership at a conference in Zürich which begins the end of the Cold War. The agreement not only introduces the Scalar Resonance technology to the world, but also sets in motion the dismantling of the Soviet Empire within Eastern Europe in exchange for the United States, the UK and Canada removing their military installations from the continent.
- Is shot twice after a speech announcing his plans for education reform by a member of a doomsday cult. Although he survives, he decides to resign from the presidency due to other developing health issues including Lou Gehrigs disease.
- Is succeeded by Vice President Rudolpho Valenzuela, who becomes the nation's first Afro-Cuban president.
- In his memoirs and a speech to the United States Congress as a keynote speaker, he reveals the existence of a secret society known as the Archons of the Holist Council, who through legal power and influence within the United States attempt to control the legal and political process as well as affecting change to the United States Constitution.
- Due to both his and his wife's increasing ill health, they decide to commit suicide by sailing a small motorboat into Lake Superior during a storm, desiring to go out on their own terms.
- Political Party: None (Independent)

=== President Olongo Featherstone-Haugh ===
- President of the North American Confederacy in The Probability Broach in the North American Confederacy series by L. Neil Smith, in which the United States becomes a libertarian state after a successful Whiskey Rebellion and George Washington being overthrown and executed by firing squad for treason in 1794.
- Born in 1932 (156 A.L.).
- Serves as vice president under Jennifer Smythe.
- Serves as the 27th President.
- Serves from 1992 to 2000.
- A gorilla, he is the first primate to hold the presidency. Due to a faster pace of technological advancement in this alternate timeline, in which Elisha Gray invents the telephone, Alexander Graham Bell invents a voder which allows simians and cetaceans to communicate, prove their sentience and gain citizenship rights equal to all humans.
- He is succeeded as president by 'none of the above', which in 2008 is elected president for Life, effectively abolishing the office of president of the North American Confederacy.
- Political Party: Gallatinist

=== President Benjamin Hayes ===
- President in Homeland
- Following President Elizabeth Keane's resignation to preserve American democracy in the face of political polarisation, misinformation and her own tarnished reputation, her vice president and successor Ralph Warner nominates Hayes as his vice president. Hayes's appointment is an attempt to unite the country, being the first vice president since Andrew Johnson to be from a political party in opposition to that of the president.
- Mentioned by White House Chief of Staff David Wellington as attending a party fundraiser in Ohio, something that neither concerns nor surprises Warner. As Ohio is planning on bringing forward its state primary, Wellington suspects that Hayes is planning on running for his party's presidential nomination in 2020, opposing Warner.
- Following the deaths of Warner and Afghan President Daoud in a helicopter crash while en route back to Bagram Airfield after delivering a speech to troops stationed in a rural area of the country announcing a peace deal between the Taliban, Afghanistan and the United States, Hayes is elevated to the presidency. Hayes orders a drone strike on the crash site to prevent Warner's corpse from being used for propaganda purposes.
- After events in Afghanistan escalate, bringing the United States and Pakistan to the brink of nuclear war, President Mirov of Russia plays recordings from the black box of Warner and Daoud's helicopter in a televised address, proving that it crashed due to mechanical problems rather than being shot down. At the behest of Mirov, Hayes backs down.
- Political Party: Republican (implied)
- Played by: Sam Trammell

=== President Henry Hayes ===
- President in Stargate SG-1 and Stargate Atlantis
- Played by: William Devane
- His vice-president is Robert Kinsey, who has ties to the rogue element of the NID
- Hayes appears to be a veteran; in the episode The Lost City, Part 1, he is revealed to have served alongside General Hammond, one of the show's heroes, with the rank of Lieutenant.
- Party: Unknown, appears to be a political moderate.

=== President Jonathan Hayes ===
- President in: First Daughter, First Target and First Shot
- Played by: Gregory Harrison

=== President Robert Hayes ===
- President in Transfer of Power and subsequent novels by Vince Flynn
- Party: Democratic
- Develops Parkinson's disease, so is unable to seek re-election
- Once held in secure bunker for many days during a terrorist attack on the White House causing his unpopular VP Sherman Baxter to take control. Hayes resumed control some days after.

=== President Mitchell Hayworth ===
- 51st President in 24
- 2014–2017
- Party: Republican
- Previously served as vice president under then-president Allison Taylor from 2013 to 2014 and as a United States senator.
- It is presumed that Hayworth is unsuccessful in his bid for a full four-year term in the 2016 Republican Party primary nomination battle against Heller.

=== President Franklin M. Heller ===
- President in the Richard Condon's 1988 novel Prizzi's Glory.
- Elected in 1988, and runs for re-election in 1992.
- Accepts millions of dollars of illegal campaign contributions from Organized Crime, and allows it to choose his Attorney General, CIA Director, and Defense Secretary.
- Refuses to allow his wife and children to appear in public except at Christmas.
- Party: Democratic

=== President James Heller ===
- 52nd President in 24: Live Another Day
- 2017–2018.
- Chief of Staff was his son-in-law Mark Boudreau, who was married to his daughter, Audrey Raines, the former love interest of Jack Bauer.
- Resigns as president after beginning to show signs of dementia, having previously been diagnosed with Alzheimer's disease, and the death of his daughter.
- Formerly the Secretary of Defense under then-Presidents John Keeler, Charles Logan, and Hal Gardner.
- Party: Republican
- Played by William Devane

=== President Helman ===
- Presidency mentioned in: Jack & Bobby
- Helman is an African-American president who visited Africa after the plague of 2018.

=== President Stephen Decatur Henderson ===
- President in Mr. President, 1962 Broadway musical by Irving Berlin
- Henderson loses his bid for re-election.
- Played by Robert Ryan

=== President Dave Hepler ===
- President in The Dave Hepler Saga, a series of alternative history novels.
- Dave Hepler becomes the 44th President of the United States after the Bush Administration's embarrassing debacle in "The War on Terror", tips the political scale back in the favor of the Democrats. Dave promises the American people a new Golden Age in his campaign and leads his country bravely during the numerous wars it becomes involved in, including the Canadian War and World War III.

=== President David Herman ===
- President in a 1996 Mad TV sketch.
- A former bagel butterer who had no opinions until drunk, he enters politics after his girlfriend breaks up with him, he gets drunk, runs for president and wins.
- By the beginning of his second term he has put men on Mars and gained three new states – Cuba, Saskatchewan, and Germany.
- Finds a cure for cancer by giving it to the heads to the seven largest corporations. Within six months there are four different cures.
- Alcoholism becomes a major problem during the Herman administration.
- Married to Winona Ryder.

=== President Zach Herney ===
- President in Deception Point by Dan Brown

=== President Carmen Hiero ===
- President in The Stone Dogs by S.M. Stirling.
- Is Vice President to President Liedermann who dies in 1991.
- Second Hispanic and first woman President of the United States.
- President Hiero is killed in the Final War with the South African-based Dominion of the Draka in 1998.
- From Sonora in an alternate timeline where Mexico is part of the United States.
- Party: Republican.

=== President Alice Hines ===
- President in the science fiction thriller Helix - They will replace us by Austrian author Marc Elsberg
- Her Secretary of State Jack Dunbraith dies at the beginning of the Story while attending the Munich Security Conference due to an unknown virus
- She is later kidnapped in the Gated community New Garden in San Diego by the so-called "modern childs", genetically modified, hyper-intelligent humans, who are responsible for the death of her Secretary
- The modern childs want to spread their virus around the world, to create a new race of advanced humans like them, but they fail to execute their plan fully
- After she is released, her government continues to research New Garden secretly, to power-up the genetics of the American population

=== President Georgina Hobart ===
- President in The Politician, a Netflix TV show
- Former governor of California
- Decides to serve one term, and her Stepson Payton Hobart is the vice presidential candidate following her presidency
- Played by Gwyneth Paltrow
- Party: Democratic

=== President Art Hockstader ===
- Former president in The Best Man (1964) by Gore Vidal
- Played by Lee Tracy

=== President Mark Hollenbach ===
- President in Fletcher Knebel's novel Night at Camp David (1965).
- Becomes mentally unstable and is forced to resign.
- Party: Democratic.

=== President Paul Hollister ===
- President in: 10.5 and 10.5: Apocalypse
- During his administration, much of the West Coast is devastated by a massive earthquake.
- Played by: Beau Bridges

=== President Wendell Holmes ===
- President (2010–2015) in the 1939 Robert A. Heinlein novel For Us, The Living: A Comedy of Customs.

=== President David Hoope ===
- President in the manga and anime series Death Note
- Elected in 2008 (whether it is his first or second term is unstated)
- Is blackmailed by the rogue detective Mello with the threat of using the Death Note to force him to launch a nuclear strike, dies of an apparent suicide in the Oval Office in 2009.
- Authorizes the creation of the SPK (Special Provisions for Kira) task force to pursue the international mass-murderer Kira and secure the Death Note.

=== President Bart Hopscotch ===
- President in the internet comic Nick Cage Movies that Don't Exist Yet
- Elected in 2042
- Bart Hopscotch is a double fictional president in that he is a character that Future Cage portrays over the months-long story arc involving the filming of a fictional movie called Con Air Force One.

=== President David Horne ===
- President in Street Sharks

=== President Jonathan Vincent Horne ===
- Succeeds Peter Ross in the DC Comics universe after Ross resigns.
- Married to Janet Manning Horne.

=== President Robert Hovelmann ===
- President in "A Clean Escape", a short story by John Kessel
- Played by Sam Waterston in the 2007 television adaptation, part of Masters of Science Fiction.

=== President John Howard ===
- President in Marvel Comics Ultimate Comics: The Ultimates
- Howard is the energy secretary when Reed Richards destroys Washington, D.C., during a presidential address to a Joint Session of Congress.

=== President Martin Howard ===
- President in the 2001 TV movie Contagion
- Shot with a dart filled with a deadly virus.
- Played by Bruce Boxleitner

=== President Eve Hubbard ===
- One of the many presidents in Robert Anton Wilson's Schrödinger's Cat trilogy
- Star of the movie Gentleman Prefer Clones, President Hubbard reforms the criminal code, ending victimless crimes. She encourages space migration, life extension, extensive automation of industry and other scientific research projects (see also SMI²LE).
- Party: Libertarian Immortalist ("No more death and taxes!")

=== President Hudson ===
- President in: Mostly Harmless by Douglas Adams
- Orders the bombing of Damascus
- According to rumours very influenced by astrology in his decisions, especially advice given by astrologer Gail Andrews
- Has "recently passed away" at the beginning of the novel

=== President Harley M. Hudson ===
- President in: Advise and Consent by Allen Drury
- Former governor of Michigan (Delaware in the movie) who is elected vice-president.
- Succeeds to presidency upon death of unnamed predecessor
- In the book's sequel, A Shade of Difference, Hudson becomes a national hero for standing up to threats by the Soviets at a conference in Geneva, and is dubbed "Fearless Peerless" by the press.
- Possibly modeled on President Harry Truman
- Assassinated via sabotage to Air Force One in a later volume of the Advise and Consent series
- Played in the movie by: Lew Ayres

=== President Huffman ===
- President in: Destroy All Humans!
- Assassinated by Crypto, who later takes his place disguised as Huffman

=== President Jean-Baptiste Huang ===
- President of the North American Confederacy in The Probability Broach, as part of the North American Confederacy Series by L. Neil Smith, in which the United States becomes a Libertarian state after a successful Whiskey Rebellion and George Washington being overthrown and executed by firing squad for treason in 1794.
- Serves as the fifteenth president.
- Serves as president of the NAC from 1880 to 1888.
- He has French Canadian and Chinese ancestry.

=== President Stuart Hughes ===
- Unseen president on Veep. However, he is mentioned as appearing in a photograph of the command centre overseeing a rescue mission in Uzbekistan. Due to his staff having difficulties finding one that did not make him "look jowly", the photograph released made it look as though his vice president, Selina Meyer, was distracted looking at her phone.
- 44th president of the United States (2013–2016).
- He decided not to run for a second term in 2016 as he was threatened with impeachment after it was revealed that one of the captives in the Uzbek hostage crisis was a spy.
- He resigned in Season 4 to take care of his mentally ill wife after she attempted suicide.
- He was succeeded as president by Meyer. Having defeated her during Super Tuesday in 2012, Hughes had sidelined her within his administration, often forcing her to abandon passion projects such as a Clean Jobs Initiative and Senate filibuster reform, and punishing her by forcing her to head up neglected projects such as a healthy eating initiative. However, he gave her special responsibility for foreign affairs following the 2014 midterms. Before his decision not to seek a second term, Hughes had considered replacing Meyer as his running mate with the more popular Danny Chung, the Governor of Minnesota and military veteran.
- He was later nominated to the Supreme Court by President Laura Montez after the death of Justice Tenny, becoming the second person in history after William Howard Taft to serve as both president of the United States and a Supreme Court Justice.
- Had been previously pro-choice before announcing that he was pro-life during the final months of his presidency, forcing Meyer and others contesting their party's 2016 presidential nomination to publicly state their positions on the subject.
- Party: Not mentioned (but implied to be Democratic).

=== President Mark Hunt ===
- Elected president in Larry Burkett's The Illuminati
- Assassinated by "The Society" for not being a puppet, succeeded by Kathy Alton
- Party: Democratic

=== President Martin Hunt ===
- President in: Shadowrun role-playing game
- 43rd US President (2001–2005)
- Defeats two-term incumbent Jeffrey Lynch in the 2000 election.
- Defeats by Philip Bester in the 2004 election.

=== Acting President Teresa Hurst ===
- President in Madam Secretary
- Vice President under Conrad Dalton, throughout his second term
- Serves in the episode "Sound and Fury"
- Becomes acting president after President Dalton makes a series of threats against Russia that call into question his mental fitness for office; after ordering an attack tantamount to war, Secretary of State Elizabeth McCord and Chief of Staff Russell Jackson organize a cabinet meeting to evoke Section 4 of the 25th Amendment, which makes Vice President Hurst the acting president. After doing so, they convince President Dalton to evoke Section 3 himself and get a check up, instead of being forced to transmit the Section 4 letters to Congress.
- Second woman to hold the powers of president, after Secretary of State Elizabeth McCord.
- Played by: Jan Maxwell
- Party: Independent (formerly republican)

=== President Franklin G. Hutchins ===
- President in NBC TV Series Code Name: Foxfire
- Brother Larry secretly handles intelligence operations for President Hutchins.
- Party: Democratic

=== President Matt Hutton ===
- Party: Republican
- President in The First Lady by Edward Gorman (as E.J. Gorman)
