= The Lady Eve =

1941 film by Preston Sturges

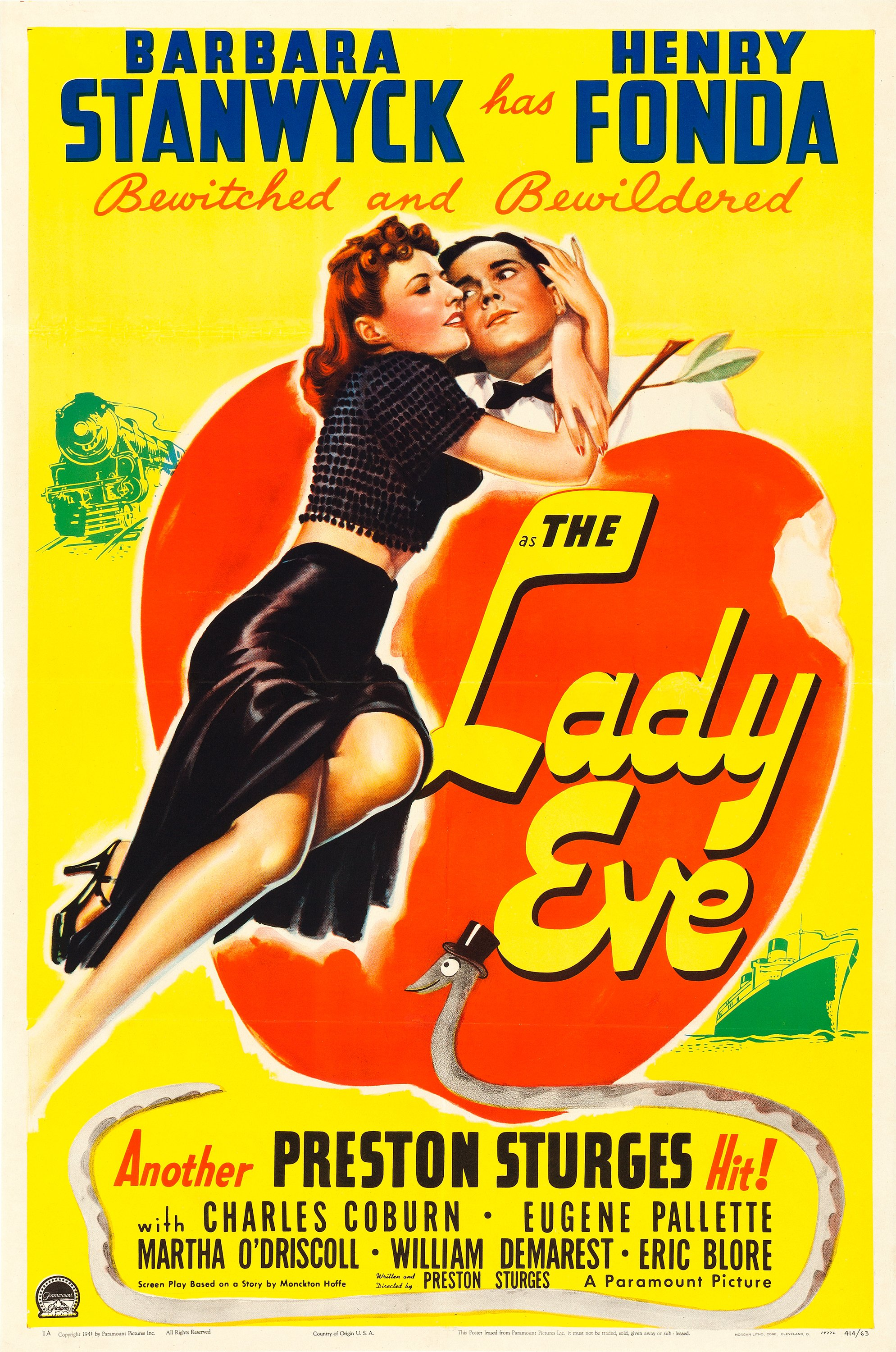
- Theatrical release poster
- Directed by: Preston Sturges
- Written by: Preston Sturges
- Based on: "Two Bad Hats" by Monckton Hoffe
- Produced by: Paul Jones (Note: Buddy G. DeSylva, William LeBaron, and Albert Lewin also acted as uncredited producers on the film.)
- Starring: Barbara Stanwyck; Henry Fonda; Charles Coburn; Eugene Pallette; Martha O'Driscoll; William Demarest; Eric Blore
- Cinematography: Victor Milner
- Edited by: Stuart Gilmore
- Music by: Sigmund Krumgold (Note: Sigmund Krumgold received the sole onscreen credit for "Musical Direction" though Phil Boutelje, Charles Bradshaw, Gil Grau,John Leipold, and Leo Shuken all made uncredited contributions to the music heard in the film.)
- Production company: Paramount Pictures
- Distributed by: Paramount Pictures
- Release date: February 25, 1941
- Running time: 94 minutes
- Country: United States
- Language: English
- Budget: $660,000

The Lady Eve is a 1941 American screwball comedy film written and directed by Preston Sturges and starring Barbara Stanwyck and Henry Fonda. The film is based on a story by Monckton Hoffe about a mismatched couple who meet on board an ocean liner. Regarded amongst the greatest films of all time, The Lady Eve was selected for preservation in the United States National Film Registry in 1994 by the Library of Congress as being "culturally, historically or aesthetically significant".

== Plot ==
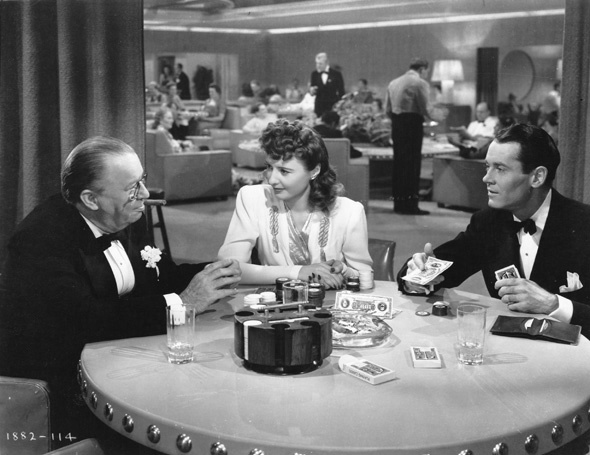
Charles Coburn, Barbara Stanwyck and Henry Fonda in The Lady Eve

Jean Harrington is a beautiful con artist, who works with her equally larcenous father, "Colonel" Harrington, and his partner Gerald. They are sailing on an ocean liner travelling from South America to New York with the intention to fleece rich, naive Charles Pike, the heir to the Pike's Pale ("The Ale That Won for Yale") fortune. Charles is a woman-shy snake expert just returning from a year-long expedition up the Amazon. Many women aboard the ship compete for his attention, but Charles is more interested in reading about snakes.

Jean meets Charles on August 28, 1940, by tripping him as he passes, and he is soon smitten with her. When Jean is terrified by a snake that Charles brought on board and got loose in his cabin, she runs to her cabin where she manoeuvres Charles, who by this time she is calling by his childhood nickname "Hopsie", into a close encounter where she evidently has an orgasm by just talking to him. They separate for the night, and meet the next morning for breakfast.

Charles's minder Muggsy suspects that Jean is a trickster looking to steal from Charles, but Charles refuses to believe him. But, despite the planned con, Jean falls in love with Charles and shields him from her card sharp father who nonetheless cuts cards with Charles and obtains a check for $32,000 from him while Jean is away ($763,000 in 2026 money). Jean insists he give the check back, and her father crumples it and tears it up, although in reality he has palmed it. Jean and Charles walk on the deck to the boat's bow where they proclaim their love for each other, discuss marriage, and kiss.

The next morning Muggsy discovers the truth and presents proof to Charlie. Charlie, even though he has already proposed to her and has been accepted, rejects Jean, and then lies to her, saying that he was the one playing her because he knew the morning after meeting her that she was a con woman trying to play him for a sucker. She walks away, heartbroken, but soon furious at being spurned.

Sometime later Jean comes up with a scheme to get revenge on Charles, and re-enters his life masquerading as "Lady Eve Sidwich", the supposed niece of Sir Alfred McGlennan Keith, another con man who has been swindling the rich of Connecticut. Jean takes on an English accent, determined to torment Charles; as she puts it, "I've got some unfinished business with him — I need him like the axe needs the turkey."

When Charles meets "Lady Eve" at a reception for her being held at his family home, he is so bewildered at her resemblance to Jean that he constantly trips and falls over himself. Although Muggsy tries to convince him that "she's the same dame", Charles reasons that Jean would not come close to his home without at least disguising herself more thoroughly. Then, Sir Alfred feeds him a story that the Lady Eve is Jean's long-lost, illegitimate sister, and Charles is convinced that she is not Jean. After a brief courtship, he proposes and they marry, right on Jean's schedule. And just as she had planned, on the train to their honeymoon "Eve" begins to "confess" her colourful past, dropping names of a stableboy ex-husband that she eloped with when she was 16, and then of six other old boyfriends and lovers, some related to each other. An increasingly angry and disgusted Charles abandons her and leaves the train.

Jean's con team urges her to close the deal by pursuing a huge divorce settlement, but by this time she has had a change of heart and tells Charles's father on the phone that she wants no money, but only wants Charles to meet her and tell her that their marriage is over. Charles refuses. Jean is then told by Charles's father that Charles is departing on an ocean voyage back to South America. She arranges passage for herself and her father on the same voyage and, just like before, meets Charles by tripping him as he passes. Charles is overjoyed to see Jean again. He kisses her and takes her hand, and they run to her cabin, where they mutually affirm their love for each other. As the cabin door closes, Charles says that he has no right to be in her cabin because he is married, and Jean replies "So am I, darling, so am I." Muggsy then emerges from the darkened cabin and says "Positively the same dame!".

== Cast ==
- Barbara Stanwyck as Jean Harrington, aka Lady Eve Sidwich
- Henry Fonda as Charles Poncefort Pike
- Charles Coburn as "Colonel" Harrington
- Eugene Pallette as Horace Pike
- William Demarest as Muggsy, aka Ambrose Murgatroyd
- Eric Blore as Sir Alfred McGlennan Keith
- Melville Cooper as Gerald
- Martha O'Driscoll as Martha, Pike's maid
- Janet Beecher as Janet Pike
- Robert Greig as Burrows, Pike's butler
- Dora Clement as Gertrude
- Luis Alberni as Emile, Pike's chef

== Production ==
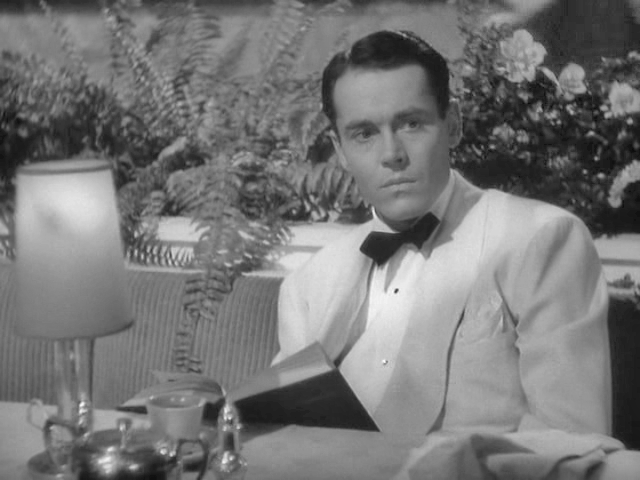
Henry Fonda from a trailer for The Lady Eve

The Lady Eve is loosely based on a 19-page story by Monckton Hoffe called "Two Bad Hats", which was also the working title of the film. Sturges was assigned in 1938 to write a script based on Hoffe's story, with Claudette Colbert expected to be the star. Sturges and Paramount producer Albert Lewin had some written disagreement in 1939 about the development of the script. Lewin wrote to Sturges, "[T]he first two-thirds of the script, in spite of the high quality of your jokes, will require an almost one hundred percent rewrite." Sturges objected, and eventually Lewin acceded, writing, "Follow your witty nose, my boy; it will lead you and me and Paramount to the Elysian pastures of popular entertainment."

The Hays Office initially rejected the script because of "the definite suggestion of a sex affair between your two leads" that lacked "compensating moral values", and a revised script was submitted and approved.

At some point, the studio wanted Brian Aherne for the male lead, and Joel McCrea, Madeleine Carroll and Paulette Goddard were under consideration as of July 1940. But in August 1940, Fred MacMurray and Madeleine Carroll were announced as the film's co-stars. In September, Darryl Zanuck lent Henry Fonda to co-star with Goddard, who was then replaced by Barbara Stanwyck.

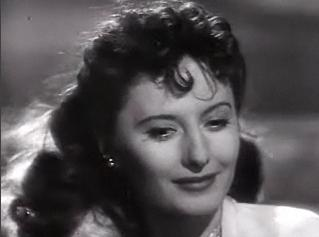
Barbara Stanwyck from a trailer for The Lady Eve

Production took place from October 21 to December 5, 1940. According to Donald Spoto in Madcap: The Life of Preston Sturges, Sturges "... invariably paraded on [the] set with a colorful beret or a felt cap with a feather protruding, a white cashmere scarf blowing gaily round his neck and a print shirt in loud hues ... the reason for the peculiar outfits, he told visitors, was that they facilitated crew members finding him amid the crowds of actors, technicians, and the public." Stanwyck compared Sturges' set to "a carnival". In his biography of Stanwyck, author Axel Madsen wrote, "The set was so ebullient that instead of going to their trailers between setups, the players relaxed in canvas chairs with their sparkling director, listening to his fascinating stories or going over their lines with him. To get into mood for Barbara's bedroom scene, Sturges wore a bathrobe."

Location shooting for the opening jungle scene took place at Lake Baldwin of the Los Angeles County Arboretum and Botanic Garden in Arcadia, California. In that scene, Fonda's character refers to Professor Marsdit, whose last name is an anagram of Raymond L. Ditmars of the American Museum of Natural History, a well-known reptile expert and popular science writer of the time.

== Release ==
=== Theatrical release ===
The film premiered in New York City on February 25, 1941, and went into general release on March 21. It was marketed with a number of taglines, including: "When you deal a fast shuffle ... love is in the cards." The film ranked among the top-grossing films of the year.

=== Home video ===
The Lady Eve was released on home video in the United States on July 12, 1990, and was rereleased on June 30, 1993. Despite issues with the condition of the surviving original film elements, the film was scanned in 4K and issued on Blu-ray disc by Criterion on July 14, 2020.

== Reception and themes ==
After The Lady Eve premiered at the Rialto Theatre, The New York Times reviewer Bosley Crowther characterized the film as "a sparkling romantic comedy". He further described the director's work: "It isn't often that this corner has good reason to bang a gong and holler 'Hurry, hurry, hurry!' As a matter of fact, it is all too rare indeed that we have even moderate provocation to mark a wonder of the cinematic world. Too many of the films on which we comment boil down to woeful mediocrity, and too many of the people who make them betray a depressing weariness."

More than 50 years later, Roger Ebert gave the film high praise: "If I were asked to name the single scene in all of romantic comedy that was sexiest and funniest at the same time, I would advise beginning at six seconds past the 20-minute mark in Preston Sturges's The Lady Eve." British critic Leslie Halliwell gave it three of four stars, stating: " ... the film itself was an unexpected delight: smouldering along in an inconsequential way, like an indoor firework to whose blue touch paper someone has just applied a light. It even has an explosive finish; but along the way it dazzles with bouts of romance, character comedy, witty dialogue and outrageous farce ... " Pauline Kael commented, "A frivolous masterpiece ... a mixture of visual and verbal slapstick, and of high artifice and pratfalls ... it represents the dizzy high point of Sturges's comedy writing." Leonard Maltin gave it three and a half of four stars: "Sometimes silly and strident, this film grows funnier with each viewing—thanks to Sturges' script, breathless pace, and two incomparable stars."

Some have identified a theme of gender inversion, with Jean Harrington clearly in control for the majority of the film until her feelings get in the way of her original intentions. Until she realizes that she loves Charles, there is little sense of the struggle between equals that typifies most romantic comedies. The film has been lauded for a unique blend of slapstick and satire. Film scholars have observed the theme of the fall of man implied by the film's title; in the literal sense, the fall is evidenced in Pike's frequent pratfalls, and figuratively, he falls from innocence as he is lured into Jean's deceptive plots.

Film critic Andrew Sarris identifies the theme of deceptiveness throughout the film, with things as small as the distinction, or lack thereof, between beer and ale, as well as the various disguises of Jean Harrington, adding depth to the plot line. Most of the characters have two names (Charles is Hopsie, Jean is Eve Sidwich); this lack of recognition sets the stage for the storyline. Sturges repeatedly suggests that the "lowliest boob could rise to the top with the right degree of luck, bluff and fraud".

On the review aggregator website Rotten Tomatoes, 99% of 104 critics' reviews are positive, with an average rating of 8.9/10. The website's consensus reads: "A career highlight for Preston Sturges, The Lady Eve benefits from Barbara Stanwyck and Henry Fonda's sparkling chemistry -- and a script that inspired countless battle-of-the-sexes comedies." Metacritic, which uses a weighted average, assigned the film a score of 96 out of 100, based on 17 critics, indicating "universal acclaim".

== Awards and honors ==
At the 14th Academy Awards, the film was nominated for Best Original Story for Monckton Hoffe, but Here Comes Mr. Jordan (Harry Segall) proved victorious. The National Board of Review nominated the film for Best Picture, and The New York Times named it as the best film of 1941.

In 1994, The Lady Eve was selected for preservation in the United States National Film Registry by the Library of Congress as being "culturally, historically, or aesthetically significant". In 2008, The Lady Eve was selected by Empire magazine as among the 500 greatest movies of all time, and one of the best 1,000 by The New York Times. In 2012, the film ranked #110 on Sight and Sound's critics' poll, and #174 on the directors' poll as selected by the British Film Institute.

The Lady Eve was listed by Time magazine as one of its "All-TIME 100 Movies". The film ranked 59th on Entertainment Weekly's list of the 100 greatest films of all time. FilmSite.org, a subsidiary of American Movie Classics, placed The Lady Eve on their list of the 100 greatest films. Films101.com ranked The Lady Eve as the 92nd best of all time.

In 2006, the Writers Guild of America ranked The Lady Eve as the 52nd best written film of all time.

The Lady Eve appears on two of the American Film Institute's lists and was nominated for several others:

- AFI's 100 Years... 100 Movies (1998) – Nominated
- AFI's 100 Years... 100 Laughs (2000) – #55
- AFI's 100 Years... 100 Passions (2002) – #26
- AFI's 100 Years... 100 Movie Quotes (2005)
  - "I need him like the axe needs the turkey." – Nominated
- AFI's 100 Years... 100 Movies (10th Anniversary Edition) (2007) – Nominated
- AFI's 10 Top 10 (2008) – Nominated Romantic Comedy Film

== Influence ==
In 1956, the plot of The Lady Eve was recycled for the film The Birds and the Bees starring George Gobel, Mitzi Gaynor and David Niven. Preston Sturges received a co-writer credit for the film, although he did not actually participate in the project.

The plot was employed as the model for Corrupting Dr. Nice, a 1997 science fiction novel by John Kessel involving time travel.

Barbara Stanwyck's Jean Harrington was one of the key reference points that James Mangold came up with for Phoebe Waller-Bridge to employ in her performance as Helena Shaw in the 2023 film Indiana Jones and the Dial of Destiny, the fifth and last Indiana Jones movie.

== Radio adaptation ==
The Lady Eve was presented on Hollywood Star Time on September 21, 1946, with Joan Blondell and John Lund in the starring roles.
