= Mark L. Van Name =

American novelist

- Born: March 14, 1955 (age 71); Florida, US
- Education: BS Applied Mathematics-Computer Science, MS Computer Science
- Occupations: Author, technology consultant
- Writing career
- Genre: Science fiction
- Notable work: One Jump Ahead
- Notable awards: Compton Crook Award
- Website: markvanname.com

Mark L. Van Name (born March 14, 1955) is an American science fiction writer and technology consultant. As of 2009, Van Name lives in North Carolina.

== About ==
With John Kessel, Van Name co-founded the Sycamore Hill Writer's Workshop in 1985, and in 1996 he, Kessel, and Richard Butner edited an anthology of stories written there, called Intersections: The Sycamore Hill Anthology, including one of his own stories.

Van Name's first professionally published science fiction short story was "My Sister, My Self", in 1984, in the anthology Isaac Asimov's Tomorrow's Voices. His first novel, One Jump Ahead, was published by Baen Books in 2007, and won the Compton Crook Award for Best First Novel in the Science Fiction, Fantasy and Horror genres in 2008. It is the first book in the Jon and Lobo series, of which he published another four books until 2012.

In 2009, he premiered a stand-up comedy routine at Balticon, the Baltimore Science Fiction Convention.

Van Name has worked in the information technology field for over 30 years, at one time serving as Vice President of Product Testing for Ziff-Davis, and has written many technical articles for print and on-line publications including Computer Shopper and PC Week. He currently is CEO of a technology assessment company, Principled Technologies, in the Research Triangle area of North Carolina.

== Bibliography ==
=== Novels ===
Jon and Lobo Series

1. One Jump Ahead (June 2007) ISBN 978-1-4165-2085-6
2. Slanted Jack (July 2008) ISBN 978-1-4165-5549-0
3. Overthrowing Heaven (June 2009) ISBN 978-1-4391-3267-8
4. Children No More (August 2010) ISBN 978-1-4391-3365-1
5. No Going Back (May 2012) ISBN 978-1-4516-3810-3
- Jump Gate Twist (July 2010) ISBN 978-1-4391-3370-5, a trade paperback omnibus re-issue of the novels One Jump Ahead and Slanted Jack accompanied by 4 essays and the short stories My Sister, My Self and Lobo, Actually

=== Short stories ===
- My Sister, My Self in Isaac Asimov's Tomorrow's Voices ed. Editors of Isaac Asimov's (Dial 0-385-27998-1, Apr '84
- "Happy Birthday" with Jack McDevitt in The Further Adventures of the Joker ed. Martin H. Greenberg (Bantam 0-553-28531-9, Mar '90
- "TV Time" in Isaac Asimov's Science Fiction Magazine [v15 # 4 & 5, No.169 & 170, April 1991] ed. Gardner R. Dozois
- "Burning Up" in When the Music's Over ed. Lewis Shiner (Bantam Spectra 0-553-28985-3, May '91
- "The Ten Thousand Things" in Jim Baen's Universe Vol.1, No.6. Also in The Best of Jim Baen's Universe II.
- "Desert Rain" with Pat Murphy in Full Spectrum 3, ed. Lou Aronica, Amy Stout & Betsy Mitchell, Doubleday Foundation, 1991
- "Broken Bits" in Future Weapons of War, Joe Haldeman and Martin H. Greenberg, Editors
- "Missing Connections" in Intersections: The Sycamore Hill Anthology ed. John Kessel, Mark L. Van Name & Richard Butner (Tor 0-312-86090-0, Jan '96)
- "Basic Training" in Armageddon ed. David Drake, Billie Sue Mosiman & Martin H. Greenberg (Baen 0-671-87876-X, May '98)

=== Anthologies ===
- Transhuman (2008) (with T K F Weisskopf)
- The Wild Side (2011)

=== Non-fiction ===
- Windows Performance Secrets (1998) (with Richard Butner)
- 2001: The Personal Computer Article in New Destinies, Vol. IX/Fall 1990 ed. Jim Baen (Baen 0-671-2016-3, Sep '90
