= Sycamore Hill Writer's Workshop =

U.S. workshop for science fiction writers

Sycamore Hill Writer's Workshop is a United States annual workshop for science fiction writers. Since its origin in 1985, it has been held in Raleigh, North Carolina; Bryn Mawr, Pennsylvania; and most recently in Little Switzerland, North Carolina.

Currently organized by Richard Butner, Sycamore Hill was started by John Kessel and Mark L. Van Name. It is an invitation-only workshop for established SF, fantasy, and slipstream writers. Attendees have included Kelly Link, Carol Emshwiller, Harlan Ellison, Bruce Sterling, Connie Willis, Karen Joy Fowler, Jonathan Lethem, James Patrick Kelly, Robert Frazier, Ted Chiang, Benjamin Rosenbaum, and Don Webb, among many others.

Butner has described the methodology used at Sycamore Hill: "We all sit in a circle. Critique starts to the author’s left and goes clockwise in order. You can talk for up to ten minutes about the story (no ad hominem stuff). There’s no cross talk during critique. At the very end, the author gets to respond at whatever length they desire."

A collection of original stories from the 1994 workshop was published as the anthology Intersections: The Sycamore Hill Anthology, edited by John Kessel, Mark L. Van Name and Richard Butner (Tor Books, 1996). It includes works by Richard Butner, Carol Emshwiller, Karen Joy Fowler, Robert Frazier, Gregory Frost, Alexander Jablokov, James Patrick Kelly, John Kessel, Nancy Kress, Jonathan Lethem, Maureen F. McHugh, Michaela Roessner, Bruce Sterling, and Mark L. Van Name.

Orson Scott Card wrote about his experience at the Sycamore Hill Writer's Workshop in the essay "On Sycamore Hill." Scholars such as Michael Collins identify Card's Sycamore Hill experience as marking a critical "turning point" in his career. Sycamore Hill is known to have shaped several award-winning stories, and is featured in the acknowledgment pages of books like Ted Chiang's Arrival (a.k.a. Stories of Your Life and Others).
