= Meeting in Infinity =

1992 collection of science fiction stories by John Kessel

- Dust-jacket illustration by Edvard Munch.
- Author: John Kessel
- Illustrator: Jeffrey K. Potter
- Cover artist: Edvard Munch
- Language: English
- Genre: Science fiction
- Publisher: Arkham House
- Publication date: 1992
- Publication place: United States
- Media type: Print (hardback)
- Pages: xvi, 309
- ISBN: 0-87054-164-1
- OCLC: 25025265
- Dewey Decimal: 813/.54 20
- LC Class: PS3561.E6675 M4 1992

Meeting in Infinity is a collection of science fiction stories by American writer John Kessel. It was released in 1992 and was the author's first book published by Arkham House . It was published in an edition of 3,547 copies. Most of the stories originally appeared in Isaac Asimov's Science Fiction Magazine and The Magazine of Fantasy and Science Fiction. "Another Orphan" won a Nebula Award in 1982.

== Contents ==
Meeting in Infinity contains the following stories:

1. "Meeting in Infinity"
2. "The Pure Product"
3. "Mrs. Shummel Exits a Winner"
4. "The Big Dream"
5. "The Lecturer"
6. "Hearts Do Not in Eyes Shine"
7. "Faustfeathers"
8. "A Clean Escape"
9. "Not Responsible! Park and Lock It!"
10. "Man"
11. "Invaders"
12. "Judgment Call"
13. "Buddha Nostril Bird"
14. "Another Orphan"
15. "Buffalo"

== Sources ==
- Chalker, Jack L.; Mark Owings (1998). The Science-Fantasy Publishers: A Bibliographic History, 1923-1998. Westminster, MD and Baltimore: Mirage Press, Ltd. pp. 58–59.
- Joshi, S.T. (1999). Sixty Years of Arkham House: A History and Bibliography. Sauk City, WI: Arkham House. p. 163. ISBN 0-87054-176-5.
- Nielsen, Leon (2004). Arkham House Books: A Collector's Guide. Jefferson, NC and London: McFarland & Company, Inc. p. 138. ISBN 0-7864-1785-4.
