= Corrupting Dr. Nice =

Science fiction book by John Kessel

- First edition cover
- Author: John Kessel
- Language: English
- Genre: Science fiction
- Publisher: Tor Books
- Publication date: 1997
- Publication place: United States
- Media type: Print (hardback & paperback)
- Pages: 316
- ISBN: 978-0312861162

Corrupting Dr. Nice is a science fiction novel by American writer John Kessel, published in 1997. It is a time travel novel modeled on the screwball comedies of the 1930s.

The story follows the rich and klutzy Owen Vannice ("Dr. Nice") as he exports a dinosaur from the Cretaceous Period. On the way to the twenty-first century, he is stranded in Jerusalem in 40 AD, where he and Genevieve Faison fall in love. However, he leaves her after discovering that she and her father are con artists. She takes revenge by impersonating a representative of the Committee to Protect the Past, marrying him and then pulling a series of surprises that leave him feeling betrayed. He realizes that he still loves the Genevieve he met in Jerusalem; they both return there and are reconciled. Meanwhile, the Zealot Simon is involved in a failed attempt to take over the time travel station in Jerusalem. He stands trial and is acquitted after a courtroom face-off between Abraham Lincoln and Jesus Christ.

Corrupting Dr. Nice was nominated for the 1998 Locus Award for Best Science Fiction Novel.

== Plot ==
Corrupting Dr. Nice is set mainly in three eras: the twenty-first century, 40 AD, and the Cretaceous Period. In 2063 AD, time travel is commonplace. Time travelers feel free to exploit the past without fear of changing their own history because each visit creates an alternate history called a "moment universe". The Saltimbanque Corporation uses it for tourism and to exploit the resources of the past. Famous historical figures are snatched from their time and brought to the twenty-first century (these include Amadeus Mozart, Sigmund Freud, Abraham Lincoln, and Jesus Christ from several different times in his life). After visitors leave a moment universe, it continues with its new history. In a few of them, permanent installations are created that can be revisited and used as way stations for time travel. One is set up in the Jerusalem of 40 AD, complete with hotels.

The story begins in the Cretaceous where Dr. Owen Vannice, heir to an enormous fortune and the Dr. Nice of the title, is working as an amateur paleontologist. Vannice arranges to transport Wilma, a baby Apatosaurus, to his home. Sabotage of the time travel apparatus strands him for a time in 40 AD and brings him in contact with a couple of con artists, Genevieve Faison and her father August. At first, the duo conspire to steal the dinosaur from Owen. However, during an abortive attempt by Zealots to take over the time travel station, Genevieve falls in love with him. Before she can confess to him that she is a con artist, Owen finds out from a third party and leaves in disgust.

Broken-hearted, but aware that she is much cleverer than Owen, Genevieve plots an elaborate revenge. Posing as Emma Zume of the Committee to Protect the Past, she arranges to visit his estate and inspect his dinosaur. She makes no attempt to disguise herself, simply altering her personality; and Owen falls in love with her because she reminds him of Genevieve. However, after they are married she pulls a series of surprises on him. She reminds him that she is a "sexual deliberationist", which turns out to mean that she believes in not having sex. She also reveals that she has conspired with her parents to retrieve a sperm sample from him so a grandchild can be grown in an artificial womb; and that his father has managed to clone Wilma for use in an exotic food industry. Feeling betrayed, he files for divorce. He also realizes that he is really in love with Genevieve, who he still fails to realize is also Emma. Having had her revenge, Genevieve discovers that it gives her little satisfaction, and she decides to go after him. Meeting in Jerusalem, they are happily reconciled.

In a parallel story line, Simon the Zealot, one of the apostles, is arrested for his role in the attempted takeover of the time travel station. He is embittered by the changes in Jerusalem and by the removal of Jesus to the future. Early in the occupation by the time travelers, his wife Alma took ill and died; and he is estranged from his son Samuel, who sings a variation of twentieth-century blues in clubs. While awaiting trial in 2063 AD, he learns about the future society that he hates and becomes skilled in manipulating public opinion. The trial is presided over by an artificial intelligence that keeps a running tally of public opinion and factors it into its verdict. Owen makes a disastrous attempt at helping Simon. Abraham Lincoln appears for the prosecution, but Simon counters with a surprise appearance by the Jesus who was extracted from his moment universe. Jesus makes a speech that moves public opinion in favor of Simon. He is acquitted, and in Jerusalem is reunited with Alma after Owen extracts her from another moment universe.

== Themes ==
The exploitation of the past in Corrupting Dr. Nice is, in part, a satire on the exploitation of the Third World. Tourists visit the past to see famous events such as the Crucifixion and the assassination of Julius Caesar. Natural resources such as oil are removed from moment universes. Sigmund Freud and Carl Jung are added to a college psychiatry department, Voltaire is a talk show host and the physicist Richard Feynman becomes a drummer in a band led by Mozart. This rebounds on the future era: the greats of the past take jobs away from citizens of the future, and some people resort to selling organs for money.

Owen Vannice is troubled by the exploitation of the past, but does not see the contradiction in stealing a dinosaur from the past. One of the roles of Genevieve is to expose the contradictions in his thinking and spur him to act on his beliefs.

== Style ==
Corrupting Dr. Nice is modeled on screwball comedies of the 1930s. The 1941 Preston Sturges film The Lady Eve is the source for much of the plot. The use of a dinosaur as a comic element echoes the snake in The Lady Eve, a leopard in the 1938 film Bringing Up Baby, and the dog in the 1937 film The Awful Truth. It also echoes the theme of an individual born into great wealth who indulges in an eccentric hobby. Other elements borrowed from these films include a bumbling hero and a zany but competent heroine. Many of the chapter headings are also famous movie titles.

The 21st century is populated with Neo-Victorians (as in the 1995 novel The Diamond Age by Neal Stephenson). Their formal, decorous society provides a setting for dialog that is rich in double entendres and verbal barbs.

Elements of cyberpunk are incorporated in the story. Owen is equipped with an artificial intelligence that has been implanted in his brain. Named Bill, it acts as a bodyguard, able to take over its body when necessary to protect him. However, he often has to suppress its violent urges. It also provides ironic commentary on his actions and has a glitch that makes it spout streams of nonsense words at times. In addition, people in the twenty-first century can install personality implants. In one scene, several women who find out about Owen's wealth try to attract him with Marilyn Monroe and Greta Garbo personalities.
