= Good News From Outer Space =

1989 novel by John Kessel

- Author: John Kessel
- Cover artist: Cityline Communications
- Language: English
- Genre: Science fiction
- Published: 1989
- Publisher: Tor Books
- Publication place: United States
- Pages: 402
- ISBN: 978-0-312-93178-0

Good News From Outer Space is a science fiction novel by American writer John Kessel. It is predominantly a satire telling the story of a resurrected reporter, George Eberhart, investigating alien involvement on Earth just prior to worldwide hysteria surrounding the countdown to the year 2000. The book was described as "madcap" and containing "gonzo plotting", which lent itself well to the satirical points Kessel was trying to make.

== Plot ==
In 1999, George Eberhart, a tabloid journalist, has been resuscitated from a suicide by a new scientific process, known as the "Han process". Amidst premillennial hysteria across the United States, compounded by both biblical prophecies concerning the End of Times and Ufologists reporting sightings of giant alien spacecraft.

The resurrected George leaves both his job and his wife, Lucy, and discovers in Raleigh, North Carolina a series of unusual incidents the locals believe are angelic interventions, but that George suspects are due to alien interference with the progress of humanity.

Rev Jimmy-Don Gilray is convinced that God is send a messenger to Earth on January 1, 2000.

Both men may be correct as either the messenger may be aliens or God, or even the Devil.

== Reception ==
=== Reviews ===
The SF Book Review found the story enjoyable and scary, noting that it is very dark. The Encyclopedia of Science Fiction found the book to be a dizzying look at humans as they approach the millennium calling the book formidable.

=== Awards ===
In 1990, Good News From Outer Space was nominated for the John W. Campbell Memorial Award for Best Science Fiction Novel, the Nebula Award for Best Novel., and the Locus Award for Best Science Fiction Novel.
