= The Moon and the Other =

2017 novel by John Kessel

- Author: John Kessel
- Language: English
- Genre: Science fiction
- Published: 2017
- Publisher: Simon & Schuster
- Publication place: United States
- Pages: 608
- ISBN: 978-1-4814-8144-1

The Moon and the Other is a science fiction novel by American writer John Kessel.

== Plot ==
In the twenty-second century, millions live in underground cities under the Moon’s surface. One city-state, the Society of Cousins, is a matriarchy that gets involved in a war with the Organization of Lunar States.
