= Masters of Science Fiction =

Television anthology series

- Intertitle
- Genre: Science fiction Anthology
- Presented by: Stephen Hawking
- Theme music composer: Edward Shearmur
- Composer: John Frizzell
- Countries of origin: United States; Canada (Note: The series was a North American co-production. Industry Productions, MOSF Productions, IDT Entertainment were based in the United States, while Reunion Pictures was based in Canada.)
- Original language: English
- No. of seasons: 1
- No. of episodes: 6

Production
- Executive producers: John W. Hyde; Brad Mendelsohn; Andrew Deane; Keith Addis
- Production locations: Vancouver, British Columbia, Canada
- Running time: approx. 41 minutes
- Production companies: Reunion Pictures; Industry Productions; MOSF Productions; IDT Entertainment

Original release
- Network: ABC
- Release: August 4 – August 25, 2007

Related
- Masters of Horror

Masters of Science Fiction is a television anthology series by some of the producers of Masters of Horror. The show debuted on ABC on August 4, 2007, at 10PM for a run of four episodes. It was originally scheduled to run in six parts, but two episodes were removed from the schedule for undisclosed reasons.

The show follows a similar format as Masters of Horror, with each hour long episode being an adaptation of a science fiction story by a reputable writer, hence the Masters in the title.

In December 2007, the show was picked up by Space in Canada. This was followed by the North American premiere of the missing two episodes. A Region 1 DVD of all six episodes was released on August 5, 2008. On February 12, 2012, the Science Channel began airing the episodes, under the title Stephen Hawking's Sci-Fi Masters, beginning with the first domestic airing of the episode "Watchbird".

The show is hosted off-screen by physicist Stephen Hawking.

== Episodes ==
No.	Title	Directed by	Written by	Original release date
1	"A Clean Escape"	Mark Rydell	Story by : John Kessel; Teleplay by : Sam Egan	August 4, 2007 (USA); November 11, 2007 (Canada)
In a post-apocalyptic future, a psychiatrist tries to help a patient regain his memory. Featuring: Sam Waterston as Havelman, Judy Davis as Dr. Deanna Evans, Allison Hossack as Kelly Prosky, Tom Butler as Warren Geslow, Robert Moloney as Pierce, Terence Kelly as Goldstone, Garry Chalk as General, Peter Bryant as Dr. Gavin, McKye Kelly as Claire, Peter Hall as Nick, Burkely Duffield as Will, Camyar Chai as Mansur, Malaya Cooks as Technician
2	"The Awakening"	Michael Petroni	Story by : Howard Fast; Teleplay by : Michael Petroni	August 11, 2007 (USA); November 25, 2007 (Canada)
In this adaptation of "The General Zapped an Angel", a major comes out of retirement when an alien comes to Earth supposedly in peace. Featuring: Terry O'Quinn as Maj Albert Skynner, Elisabeth Röhm as Lt. Granger, William B. Davis as President, Julian D. Christopher as General MacKenzie, Malcolm Stewart as Col. Dingham, Doron Bell as Kirby, Samir El Sharkawi as Iraqi, Dave Lantaigne as Army Officer, Adrian Glynn McMorran as Medic, Dean Marshall as General's Aide, Hiro Kanagawa as Captain Oguchi, Johannah Newmarch as Assistant, Mitra Lohrasb as Palestinian Woman, Andre Fex as French Leader, Deni DeLory as Interpreter, Veena Sood as Dr. Kashani, Parm Soor as Pakistani Leader, Scott Miller as Technician, Eddy Ko as Chinese Leader, Igor Ingelsman as Russian Leader, Laura Soltis as Skynner's Wife, Ben Cotton as Creature
3	"Jerry Was a Man"	Michael Tolkin	Story by : Robert A. Heinlein; Teleplay by : Michael Tolkin	August 18, 2007 (USA); November 18, 2007 (Canada)
A wealthy couple come into possession of an anthropoid called Jerry. Featuring: Malcolm McDowell as Tibor Cargrew, Anne Heche as Martha Von Vogel, Russell Porter as Bronson, Jason Diablo as Jerry, Bill Dow as McCoy, Sonja Bennett as Judge Pomfrey, Val Cole as News Anchor, Osmond L. Bramble as Bailiff, Matty Finochio as Judge # 2, David Neale as Pyramus, Jeanie Cloutier as Judge # 3
4	"The Discarded"	Jonathan Frakes	Story by : Harlan Ellison; Teleplay by : Harlan Ellison and Josh Olson	August 25, 2007 (USA); December 16, 2007 (Canada)
A group of mutants exiled from Earth are forced to make a pact with those that sent them adrift in space. Featuring: Brian Dennehy as Bedzyk, John Hurt as Samswope, James Denton as Barney Curran, Gina Chiarelli as Annie, Lori Triolo as Harmony Teet, Donny Lucas as Steve, Vicky Lambert as Frenchy, Alex Zahara as Bucky, Leanne Adachi as Sharon, Jason Diablo as Smiler, Brian Dobson as Voice of Samswope 2, Barbara Kottmeier as Sis, Harlan Ellison as Nate, Ken Kramer as Schmool, Gillian Barber as Dr. Goldstein
5	"Little Brother"	Darnell Martin	Walter Mosley	December 2, 2007 (Canada)
Set in the future, we are introduced to courtrooms without human judges or juries, and automated justice is the law of the land. Featuring: Kimberly Elise as Tilly Vee, Clifton Collins Jr. as Frendon Blythe, Garwin Sanford as Judge - The Court, Daryl Shuttleworth as Otis Brill, Matthew Walker as Augustus, Jorgito Vargas Jr. as Young Man, Lorena Gale as Mary - Mother, Shelley MacDonald as Female Guard, Nicole Muñoz as Frightened Girl, Adrien Dorval as Officer Bernard, Keith Dallas as Officer Labey, Joanna Reid as Defense Attorney, Donna Yamamoto as Asian Police Woman, Louis Chirillo as Interrupt Progarm 91, Alex Kliner as Juror #1 - Jessup, Doreen Ramus as Juror #2 - Renee, Carlos Joe Costa as Juror #3 - Kwame, Alexia Fast as Juror #4 - Ginnie, Ellen Ewusie as Black Woman - Juror #5, Jim Shepard as Middle Aged White Man - Juror #6, Ray G. Thunderchild as Native American Man - Juror #7, Greg Chan as Old Chinese Man - Juror #8, John Burnside as Juror #9, Jeni Le Gon as Juror #10, Nimet Kanji as Juror #11, Esme Lambert as Juror #12
6	"Watchbird"	Harold Becker	Story by : Robert Sheckley; Teleplay by : Sam Egan	December 9, 2007 (Canada)
In the not too distant future, Watchbird robots, previously used as unmanned weapons for the military, are assigned to aid police forces in a small number of cities. Watchbirds can prevent killings before they happen. However, soon everyone discovers the fragile formula of life and death. Featuring: James Cromwell as Randolph Ludwin, Sean Astin as Charlie Kramer, Vincent Gale as Jack Valentine, Stacy Grant as Sarah Moser, Christine Chatelain as Marissa, Michael Kopsa as Ratcliffe, Sally Kellerman as The Watchbird (voice), Viv Leacock as Willy, Dean Redman as Bradley Tanner, David Abbott as President, Ivan De Leon as Hispanic Youth #1, Andreas Abbondanza as Hispanic Youth #2, Ken Camroux-Taylor as Summer, A.B. Chater as Terrorist #1, Mehdi Darvish as Terrorist #2, Sean Owen Roberts as Mugger, Alistair Abell as SWAT Leader, Gerry South as Gunman, Vanesa Tomasino as Housekeeper, Jill Krop as TV Newscaster, Link Baker as Technician, Mark Docherty as TV Newscaster, Paul Herbert as Medical Technician (uncredited), Javier Villarreal as Additional Voices (uncredited). Soundtrack Céu - Rainha
