= A Clean Escape =

- Short story by John Kessel
- Country: United States
- Language: English
- Genre: Science fiction

Publication
- Published in: Isaac Asimov's Science Fiction Magazine
- Publication type: Magazine
- Publisher: Davis Publications
- Publication date: May 1985

″A Clean Escape″ is a 1985 science fiction short story by American writer John Kessel. The story was first published in Isaac Asimov's Science Fiction Magazine in May 1985, and later adapted into a play by author in 1986. It features a psychiatrist attempting to cure a special patient of his amnesia. Slowly, as the patient regains his memory, more and more secrets are revealed about who this person is and the truth about their civilization as a whole.

The story was adapted by Sam Egan as the script for the first episode of Masters of Science Fiction, which first aired August 4, 2007. A psychiatrist is treating a weapons manufacturer with anterograde amnesia, whose memories reboot once every 12 hours, leading him to believe he has just left his family to go to work but has been sent to the company shrink for evaluation. In reality however, much, much more time has passed than the viewer is originally led to believe. As the patient's memories are slowly becoming untangled, showing hints at a corporate conspiracy, but the actual truth of the matter is much worse than that. The corporate power play did happen, but that was decades ago - in reality, the patient had used his business connections to launch a presidential campaign, leading to him being elected President of the United States.

An international incident leads him to deploy an experimental defense technology his company had developed, which proves far stronger than intended, causing a nuclear chain reaction that destroys the majority of humanity. The patient and the psychiatrist are in fact in a government bunker deep beneath the ruins of the United States, and the patient's amnesia is a psychological response to finding the charred remains of his family in the ruins of the White House. The psychiatrist, having also lost her family in the disaster, and dying of cancer caused by radiation exposure, has clung to life only to force her patient to accept the truth. Having seen it happen, she commits suicide. The next day, her successor meets with the patient again, whose mind has once again rebooted to that same morning, decades ago.
