= John Kessel =

American author (born 1950)

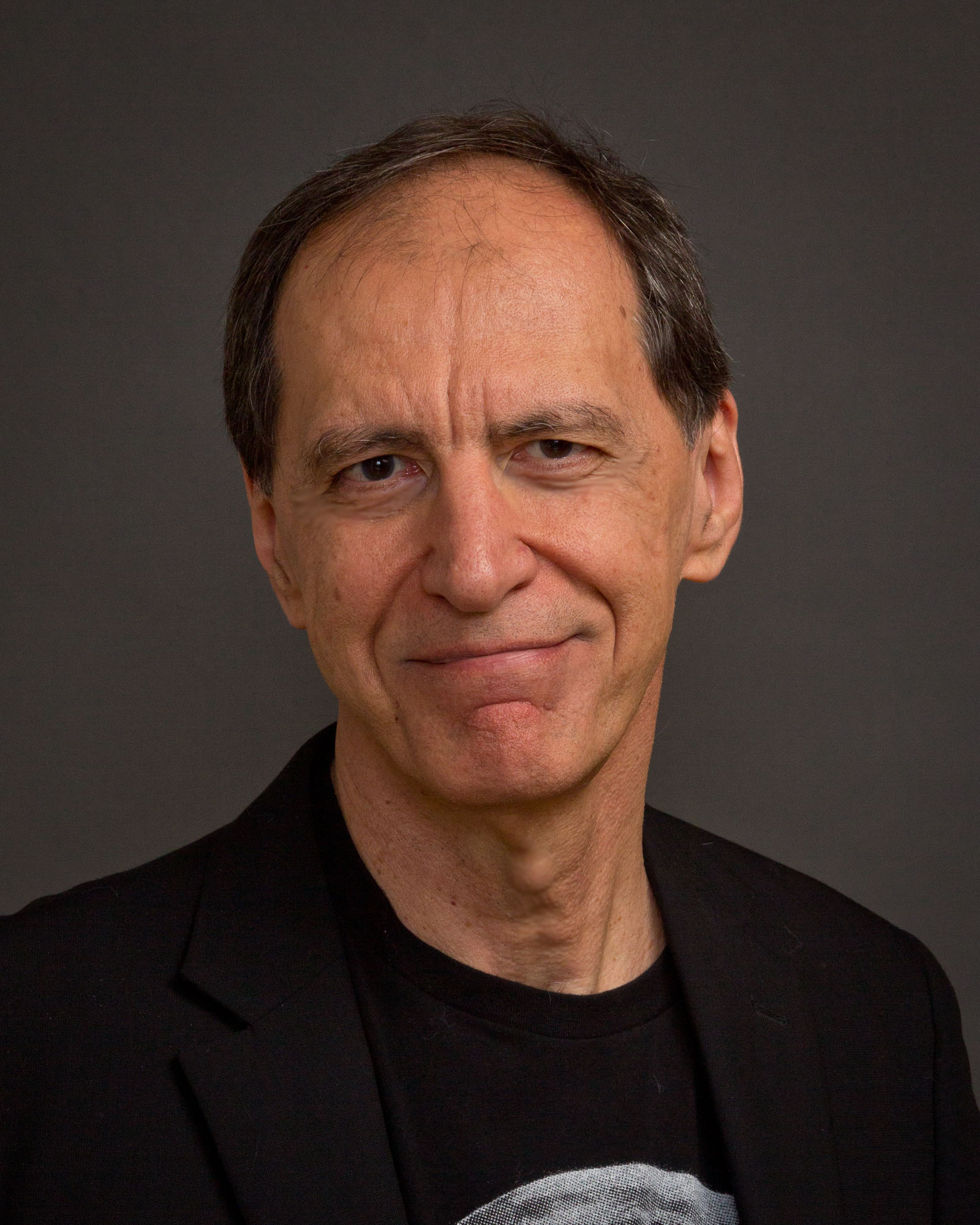
- Born: September 24, 1950 (age 75); Buffalo, New York, United States
- Occupations: Writer; editor; teacher
- Spouse: Therese Anne Fowler
- Writing career
- Period: 1978–present
- Genres: Science fiction, fantasy literature, comic science fiction, metafiction, satire
- Subjects: Time travel, the future, dinosaurs
- Notable works: Another Orphan, Good News from Outer Space, "Buffalo", "Pride and Prometheus", Corrupting Dr. Nice
- Literary movement: Savage Humanism
- Website: johnjosephkessel.wixsite.com/kessel-website

John Joseph Vincent Kessel (born September 24, 1950) is an American author of science fiction and fantasy. He is a prolific short story writer, and the author of four solo novels, Good News From Outer Space (1989), Corrupting Dr. Nice (1997), The Moon and the Other (2017), and Pride and Prometheus (2018), and one novel, Freedom Beach (1985) in collaboration with his friend James Patrick Kelly. Kessel is married to author Therese Anne Fowler.

== Education ==
Kessel earned a B.A. in Physics and English from the University of Rochester in 1972, followed by a M.A. in English from University of Kansas in 1974, and a Ph.D. in English from the University of Kansas in 1981, where he studied under science fiction writer and scholar James Gunn. Since 1982 Kessel has taught classes in American literature, science fiction, fantasy, and fiction writing at North Carolina State University, and helped organize the MFA Creative Writing program at NCSU, serving as its first director.

== Publications ==
Kessel won a Nebula Award in 1982 for his novella Another Orphan, in which the protagonist finds himself living inside the novel Moby-Dick. His short story "Buffalo" won the Theodore Sturgeon Memorial Award and the Locus poll in 1992. He won a second Nebula Award for his 2008 novelette Pride and Prometheus, a melding the tales of Jane Austen's Pride and Prejudice and Mary Shelley's Frankenstein. The intervening 26 years between his two Nebula Awards was the longest gap between competitive awards in Nebula history. The novelette also won a 2009 Shirley Jackson Award, and was expanded into a novel by the same name in 2018.

His novella "Stories for Men" shared the 2002 James Tiptree Jr. Award (Otherwise Award) for science fiction dealing with gender issues with M. John Harrison's novel Light. He has been nominated three times for a World Fantasy Award: 1993 for the Meeting in Infinity collection, 1999 for the short fiction "Every Angel is Terrifying", and 2009 for the short story "Pride and Prometheus".

Kessel is also a widely published science fiction and fantasy critic. His works of criticism include the 2004 essay on Orson Scott Card's novel Ender's Game, "Creating the Innocent Killer: Ender's Game, Intention, and Morality". With Mark L. Van Name, Kessel created the Sycamore Hill Writer's Workshop. Kessel has also edited, with James Patrick Kelly, three collections of contemporary sf short stories, Feeling Very Strange: The Slipstream Anthology, Rewired: The Post-Cyberpunk Anthology, and The Secret History of Science Fiction.

In 1994 his play Faustfeathers received the Paul Green Playwrights' Prize. In 2007 his story "A Clean Escape" (previously adapted by Kessel as a one-act play in 1986) was adapted by Sam Egan for ABC's science fiction anthology series Masters of Science Fiction.

== Bibliography ==
=== Novels ===
Title	Year	First published	Awards/nominations	Notes
Freedom Beach	1985	Kessel, John; Kelly, James Patrick (1985). Freedom Beach. Orion Publishing.		
Good News From Outer Space	1989	Kessel, John (1989). Good News from Outer Space. Tor Books.	Nebula Award nominee	
Corrupting Dr. Nice	1997	Kessel, John (1997). Corrupting Dr. Nice. Tor Books.		
The Moon and the Other	2017	Kessel, John (2017). The Moon and the Other. Simon & Schuster.	James Tiptree Jr. Award long list	
Pride and Prometheus	2018	Kessel, John (2018). Pride and Prometheus. Simon & Schuster.		

=== Short fiction ===
Collections

Title	Year	First published	Awards/nominations	Notes
Meeting in Infinity	1992	Kessel, John (1992). Meeting in Infinity: Allegories & Extrapolations. Arkham House.	World Fantasy Award nominee	
The Pure Product	1997	Kessel, John (1997). The Pure Product: Stories By John Kissel. Tor Books.		
The Baum Plan for Financial Independence and Other Stories	2008	Kessel, John (2008). The Baum Plan for Financial Independence: and Other Stories. Small Beer Press.		
The Dark Ride	2022	Kessel, John (2023). The Dark Ride: The Best Short Fiction of John Kessel. Subterranean Press.		
The Presidential Papers	2024	Kessel, John (2024). The Presidential Papers (Outspoken Authors #31). PM Press.		

Stories and other short works

Title	Year	First published	Awards/nominations	Notes
"Another orphan"	1982	Kessel, John (September 1982). "Another orphan". The Magazine of Fantasy & Science Fiction.	Nebula Award winner	
"Mrs. Shummel Exits a Winner"	1988	Kessel, John (June 1988). "Mrs. Shummel Exits a Winner". Asimov's Science Fiction .	Nebula Award nominee	
Another orphan	1989			Novella
"Buffalo"	1991	Kessel, John (January 1991). "Buffalo". The Magazine of Fantasy & Science Fiction.	Sturgeon Award winner, Locus Award winner, Hugo Award nominee, Nebula Award nominee	
The Franchise	1993	Kessel, John (August 1993). "The Franchise". Asimov's Science Fiction .	Nebula Award nominee, Hugo Award nominee	Novelette
The Miracle of Ivar Avenue	1996	John, Kessel (1996). "The Miracle of Ivar Avenue". In Kessel, John; Van Name, Mark L.; Butner, Richard (eds.). Intersections: The Sycamore Hill Anthology. New York: Tor Books. ISBN 9780312860905.	Nebula Award nominee	Novelette
"Every Angel is Terrifying"	1998	Kessel, John (October–November 1998). "Every Angel is Terrifying". The Magazine of Fantasy & Science Fiction.	World Fantasy Award nominee	
Ninety Percent of Everything	1999	Kessel, John; Lethem, Jonathan; Kelly, James Patrick (September 1999). "Ninety Percent of Everything". The Magazine of Fantasy & Science Fiction.	Nebula Award nominee	Novella
"Stories for Men"	2002	Kessel, John (October–November 2002). "Stories for Men". Asimov's Science Fiction .	James Tiptree Jr. Award winner, Nebula Award nominee	
Pride and Prometheus	2008	Kessel, John (January 2008). "Pride and Prometheus". The Magazine of Fantasy & Science Fiction.	Nebula Award winner, Shirley Jackson Award winner, James Tiptree Jr. Award Honor List	Novelette
Spirit level	2020	Kessel, John (July–August 2020). "Spirit level". The Magazine of Fantasy & Science Fiction. 139 (1&2): 52–77.		Novelette

=== Anthologies and collections (edited) ===
- 1996 Intersections: The Sycamore Hill Anthology (with Mark L. Van Name and Richard Butner)
- 1998 Memory's Tailor (by Laurence Rudner. Kessel was the literary executor after Rudner's death in 1995.)
- 2006 Feeling Very Strange: The Slipstream Anthology (with James Patrick Kelly) Features stories by Aimee Bender, Michael Chabon, Ted Chiang, Carol Emshwiller, Jeffrey Ford, Karen Joy Fowler, Theodora Goss, Jonathan Lethem, Kelly Link, M. Rickert, Benjamin Rosenbaum, George Saunders, Bruce Sterling, Jeff VanderMeer, and Howard Waldrop
- 2007 Rewired: The Post-Cyberpunk Anthology (coedited with James Patrick Kelly) (Tachyon Publications)
- 2009 The Secret History of Science Fiction (coedited with James Patrick Kelly) (Tachyon Publications)
- 2011 Kafkaesque: Stories Inspired by Franz Kafka (coedited with James Patrick Kelly) (Tachyon Publications)
- 2012 Nebula Awards Showcase 2012 (coedited with James Patrick Kelly (Pyr)
- 2012 Digital Rapture: The Singularity Anthology (coedited with James Patrick Kelly) (Tachyon Publications)

=== Plays ===
- 1986 A Clean Escape
- 1994 Faustfeathers (Paul Green Playwrights' Prize winner)

=== Book reviews ===
Year	Review article	Work(s) reviewed
1994	Kessel, John (February 1994). "Just like real people". Books. The Magazine of Fantasy & Science Fiction. 86 (2).	Jones, Gwyneth. White Queen.; Bisson, Terry. Bears discover fire.; Frost, Gregory (1993). The pure cold light. Avonova.; Sturgeon, Theodore (1993). Argyll. The Sturgeon Project.; Smith, Cordwainer. The rediscovery of man.; Oberndorf, Charles. Testing.
