= Market Forces =

2004 novel by Richard Morgan

- UK hardback edition cover
- Author: Richard Morgan
- Language: English
- Genre: Science fiction
- Publisher: Victor Gollancz Ltd
- Publication date: 2004
- Publication place: United Kingdom
- Media type: Print (hardback & paperback)
- Pages: 386 (hardback), 464 (paperback)
- ISBN: 0-345-45774-9 (hardback), ISBN 0-575-07584-8 (paperback)
- OCLC: 55016258
- Dewey Decimal: 813/.6 22
- LC Class: PR6113.O748 M37 2005

Market Forces is a science fiction thriller novel by British writer Richard Morgan. Set in 2049, the story follows Chris Faulkner as he starts his new job as a junior executive at Shorn Associates, working in their Conflict Investment division where the company supports foreign governments in exchange for a percentage of the country's gross domestic product. Contracts are awarded, and promotions are given to employees, through driving duels in which combatants race vehicles on empty roads and often kill their opponents. With the Shorn-supported Colombian dictator Echevarria expected to transfer power to his son, who is supported by a competing firm, Chris allies Shorn with a rebel group to overthrow the government, though other executives attempt to sabotage his plans.

First published in 2004 by Victor Gollancz Ltd, the book is Morgan's third novel, the first two being part of the Takeshi Kovacs series. Market Forces satirises corporate practices and globalisation and carries the theme of competition throughout the story. Violence is used as a metaphor for the mechanisms underlying capitalism and assumptions about haves and have-nots are challenged. It won the John W. Campbell Memorial Award for Best Science Fiction Novel in 2005 and was nominated for the Arthur C. Clarke Award. Though book reviewers gave it a mixed reception, Morgan's descriptive writing and action sequences received praise.

== Background ==
Market Forces was science fiction author Richard K. Morgan's third novel. His first two novels, Altered Carbon (2002) and Broken Angels (2003), were the first two parts of a trilogy later completed with Woken Furies (2005). That Takeshi Kovacs trilogy, hardboiled detective fiction set in the 25th century, gave Morgan a reputation for writing excellent action sequences along with a Philip K. Dick Award. Before the third part of the trilogy was published, Morgan worked on his idea for Market Forces, which he conceived of as a short story, then developed as a film script, then as a novel. At the time, Morgan was 38 years old living in Glasgow, Scotland. He has sold the filming rights to Altered Carbon to Warner Bros. (he would also sell the rights to Market Forces to Warner Bros.) allowing him to leave his job as an English teacher at the University of Strathclyde to focus on his writing career.

== Plot ==
In 2049, Chris Faulkner is recruited by Shorn Associates, an investment firm in London. There he befriends Mike Bryant, a fellow junior executive in the "Conflict Investment" division. Conflict Investment provides resources to incumbent or rebel factions in exchange for promised share of the nation's gross domestic product. CI members often toast to continued "small wars" as their primary source of income for themselves and their investors.

Executive advancement in 2049 is not based on merit or politics alone, rather executives can issue challenges to each other which are held on highways emptied of cars and usually fought to the death, in a fashion similar to Mad Max, a source cited as inspiration by the author in the acknowledgements of the book. Chris Faulkner gains recognition and small celebrity for a particularly brutal win over a much older and more seasoned member of his firm, from which he is head-hunted by Shorn to join their team. Within the media landscape, business executives have fame on the order of sports stars or movie actors and their driving duels are analysed and covered as sporting events. Chris' wife Carla is also his mechanic, a vital role where an executive's car is the difference between promotion and death. She is not a fan of the way he makes his living, but they have an initially strong relationship.

During a night out in one of the Zones – the cordoned off zone of decaying ghettos surrounding the City of London – Mike introduces Chris to journalist Liz Linshaw, who is also Mike's former mistress. Before they leave the Zones, Mike brutally executes several gang members who attempt to steal his car. With Shorn's contract in Cambodia due for renewal, they are challenged by competing agencies Nakamura and Acropolitic. The challenge is settled by a driving duel in which the Shorn team eliminates the two competing teams. Chris' profile is greatly increased with this victory, including appearances on TV and magazines as the latest star from a line of Shorn executives. As Chris becomes famous for his driving performance, he begins an affair with Liz Linshaw. Mike brings Chris in to use contacts and analysis from his prior firm to assist into a project regarding propping up the ageing Colombian dictator General Hernan Echevarria. With Echevarria's son, Francisco, who is aligned with a competing American firm, preparing to take over, Chris believes that a long-time rebel leader might be a better option than Francisco. Vincente Barranco, the rebel leader chosen by Chris, is signed to a contract with Shorn and brought to London to shop for arms to bring his small force the resources they need to overthrow Hernan before Francisco takes over. However, other Shorn executives sabotage Chris's efforts by arranging for Barranco to overhear a Shorn executive negotiate with the Echevarrias. When challenged by Barranco that he is not truly committed to his cause, Chris reacts by spontaneously beating Hernan to death in a conference room. Shorn concocts a coverup and pins Hernan's death on an otherwise unknown terrorist group. The killing is also concealed from most of Shorn's employees, but the senior partner of CI agrees that while a completely unorthodox act, it's the sort of rule bending which is sometimes needed to return the maximum for their clients. While his actions convince Barranco that he is, in fact, committed to his side, Chris is removed from the Colombia job which is handed over to a partner, Hamilton, who takes a more pragmatic view and moves to align with Hernan's son.

One thing that every Conflict Investment client Chris had ever dealt with had in common was their love of developed world technotoys. It was basic CI wisdom, handed down from partners to analysts everywhere in the trade. Don't stint on toys. At the top of every hardware gift list, you placed your state-of-the-art global communications gadgetry. That, and personalised airliners. Then the military stuff. Always in that order, it never failed.

— Market Forces, page 209.

As it is clear that the demands of his job are taking a toll on Chris, Carla becomes increasingly uncomfortable with the brutal competition among firms and the violence they incite in other countries. Seeking an escape from Shorn and to save their marriage, Carla, with the help of her father, who lives in the London Zones, and her mother in Sweden, secures a position at the United Nations as an ombudsman, a sort of outside auditor/investigator who attempts to enforce the UN's mandate across the world. This position is viewed as honourable but ultimately ineffective as neither the US nor UK recognise the UN's authority and run roughshod over them in their pursuit of profits. After an initially frosty meeting, Chris' conditions are agreed on, but with the requirement that he stay in place at Shorn through the end of the current conflict in Cambodia, in which Shorn is backing a rebel leader.

As the conflict in Colombia tilts in favour of the son, Hamilton goes outside of the normal chain of command to plan the execution of Barranco and the elimination of the local Shorn representative in a gladiatorial duel. Faulkner finds out about this and barges into a video conference Hamilton is having with Francisco, telling him that he in fact killed his father with his bare hands. He then beats Hamilton and breaks his neck. He is duly captured and placed in a Corporation operated jail. In jail, Chris is offered a choice: be convicted of murder and have his organs harvested after being subject to capital punishment or participate in face-saving (for Shorn) farce by saying he had legally issued a challenge to Hamilton for his position in the firm. Conditions of this agreement are steep however as he must drive against Mike Bryant, who he had grown to be truly close with, but who is now completely done with him with revelation of Chris' affair with Liz Linshaw and Chris' brutal killings outside of the bounds of the challenge process. The night prior to the challenge, the UN representative returns with the chance for Chris to escape and reunite with his estranged wife, who has left the country. He declines. Mike is the superior driver but using a creative interpretation of challenge rules, Chris forces Mike to drive off a bridge and into the Zones. Chris finds the badly injured Mike and kills him just before a gang, who had watched the duel on television, finds them. The gang beats Chris but he survives when the gang is gunned down by Driver Control authorities, the sanctioning body for duels. The story ends with Chris, as the new partner in the firm, giving the new dictator Francisco Echevarria 48 hours to flee his country in favour of installing Barranco.

== Style and themes ==
Market Forces is a science fiction thriller set nearly fifty years after its writing featuring a protagonist who fights lethal battles to win contracts for his company and to retain his position within the company. While the story is fictional, the author included a bibliography section that informed the story's satire of globalisation and modern corporate practices. Morgan extrapolates trends in free market capitalism out fifty years to a point where corporations are unfettered by domestic governments. It is a dystopian vision where large corporations constantly battle to rule entire countries using humans as pawns. The protagonist, Chris Faulkner, can be viewed as a personification of the story's take on the development of its economic system; the character is written to be likeable but becomes increasing brutal as he invests himself deeper into the corporate culture.

The review in The New York Times compared the corporate culture and market mechanisms that led to the Enron scandal with the fictional background of the novel. The same reviewer compared Market Forces to Robert Stone's A Flag for Sunrise which also concerns political and social issues but in a fictional Central American country. The story's use of social commentary is similar to the works of science fiction authors Frederik Pohl and Cyril M. Kornbluth in the 1950s. Book reviewer Nisi Shawl wrote that this story could be part of a subgenre of stories using life-in-a-corporation as a background, along with Eileen Gunn's "Stable Strategies for Middle Management", Kelley Eskridge's "Solitaire", and Charles Stross' Accelerando. Morgan's use of action sequences and car chases led to several comparisons to similar movie sequences, and specifically to Jerry Bruckheimer and Michael Bay movies.

=== Competition ===
The physical violence in the story is a metaphor for the mechanisms behind capitalism. Morgan uses competition as theme throughout novel, punctuated by the "portrayal of a society governed by extreme violence, ruthlessness and with no account for law, morals or humanity". Violent competition, where the losers die, is the norm and comes in the form of businesses competing for contracts, employees competing for promotions, foreign governments fighting insurgents, and other stand-offs between characters. Non-violent competition is viewed as a novelty or ineffective, like playing chess or publishing opinion essays. The existence of winners and losers and the duality of "haves and the have-nots" are contrasted. By illustrating how the First World exploits the Third World and the corporate executive's use of the ghetto areas, the novel challenges the idea that the have-nots are there by choice or that they competed and lost.

== Publication and reception ==
Market Forces was published by Gollancz in United Kingdom and Del Rey Books in North America. The hardcover was released simultaneously in 2004 along with the ebook and audiobook versions. The audiobook, read unabridged by Simon Vance was published by Tantor Media in CD and mp3 formats. A tradepaperback version was released by the same publishers in 2007. The book was awarded the John W. Campbell Memorial Award for Best Science Fiction Novel in 2005 and nominated for the Arthur C. Clarke Award for best science fiction novel first published in the United Kingdom.

Market Forces is a strange and not always successful mix of corporate satire, video game thriller and progressive essay. The violence is often brutal and graphic, and none of the characters, even the conflicted Faulkner, is particularly heroic or sympathetic. But it succeeds because Morgan keeps his storytelling front and center, aside from the occasional pointed speech by one of his characters. And he also makes sure that his future, no matter how violent or shocking, is a reasonable extrapolation of present-day corporate culture.

— Rob Thomas, The Capital Times

Numerous reviewers commented on the action sequences and violence with several noting they were better suited to a theatrical version rather than literature. While reviewers variously called it a "high-octane, stomach-churning terror ride" and "turbo-injected with moral ambiguity", others noted that the action eventually grows tiresome. Reviewers also noted that the "action sequences [are used to] keep the critique from becoming preachy" or otherwise too serious. In The San Diego Union-Tribune, the reviewer wrote "As a motorhead, I liked a lot of elements in this novel. On the other hand, I found a lot of the corporate and corp-rat behavior ranged from disturbing to disgusting." The reviewer in The Mercury concluded, "This is not comfortable or enjoyable bedtime reading. The inventive language, punk dialogue and feverish action create sustained tension throughout...It's hell-on-wheels fiction—entertainment that will appeal to many, particularly those who are hot car enthusiasts."

Numerous reviewers commented on Morgan's writing and story. In The Seattle Times, journalist and science fiction author Nisi Shawl tied the writing quality to the action scenes, "Morgan's talent for tension-building is matched by the clarity with which he describes the sideswiping, rubber-burning, rear-end-ramming, full-contact racing scenes. And both these skills are quietly eclipsed by his word-for-word writing ability. Apt metaphors and similes abound." However, science fiction critic Robert K. J. Killheffer, in The Magazine of Fantasy & Science Fiction, wrote "it's not his best – it lacks the dense and evocative background of his Takeshi Kovacs books, and Morgan is not as sure-handed with near-future situations and characters – but it takes chances and largely succeeds." Likewise, in the San Francisco Chronicle the reviewer wrote "In its present form, the novel feels bloated and obvious, despite the sharpness of the descriptive writing and a couple of first-rate fight sequences. With the right artist, Market Forces might still make a compelling—and necessarily shorter—graphic novel." The Library Journal review ended with a recommendation: "Morgan's sf suspense belongs in most sf collections." The reviewer in Booklist concluded "It's not a particularly pleasant future, but Morgan paints it in broad strokes, drawing us into his future world and making it feel like a natural outgrowth of today's corporate chicanery. The novel might have been unremittingly bleak if it weren't for the moral center provided by Faulkner, who is a genuinely likable guy. Fans of Morgan's gritty, noirish brand of sf will flock to this one."
