= The Steel Remains =

2008 novel by Richard K. Morgan

- Cover of the first British hardcover edition
- Author: Richard K. Morgan
- Language: English
- Series: A Land Fit For Heroes
- Genre: Fantasy
- Publisher: Victor Gollancz Ltd
- Publication date: August 7, 2008
- Publication place: Great Britain
- Media type: Print (Hardcover)
- Pages: 352 (Hardcover)
- ISBN: 0-575-07792-1 (Hardcover)
- OCLC: 229464032
- Followed by: The Cold Commands

The Steel Remains is a 2008 fantasy novel by British writer Richard K. Morgan. It is the first fantasy book by Morgan, a noted science fiction author known for the Takeshi Kovacs trilogy and the standalone novels Market Forces and Black Man.

The Steel Remains is the first book in the A Land Fit For Heroes trilogy. A Land Fit For Heroes was originally the working title of the book, and was retained as the series title after first Morgan and the UK publisher, and then the US publisher, decided to title the book The Steel Remains. The following two volumes, The Cold Commands, and The Dark Defiles, were published in 2011 and 2014 respectively.

== Plot ==
Ringil Eskiath is a war hero from a conflict between humans and the lizard-like Scaled Folk, although he is now shunned by his aristocratic family in the city of Trelayne, part of the Northern League, due to his homosexuality and cynicism. He is contacted by his mother in his self-imposed exile after a distant cousin, Sherrin, is sold into legal slavery to pay off her husband's debt. He returns to Trelayne and his investigations reveal the presence of a Dwenda, an other-worldly being who lives outside of conventional time, who is aiding the slavers. He fights the Dwenda, named Seethlaw, but is captured and taken to the Aldrain Marches, the grey places between worlds. After a mentally grueling journey, they emerge at Ennishmin, a marshland and the site of an ancient and destroyed Dwenda city.

Two of Ringils comrades in the war against the Scaled Folk are also drawn towards Ennishmin. Archeth serves, somewhat reluctantly, at the Imperial Yhelteth court. She is half Kiriath, a mysterious people who arrived in the world centuries ago and who aided the humans against the lizards before departing to a destination unknown. She is dispatched to investigate an attack on a port and discovers evidence that suggest Dwenda involvement. The Kiriath banished the Dwenda from the world many years ago and feared their return. Egar Dragonbane is Majak, a nomadic people who farm the steppes. After failing to adapt fully to his post-war position as clan-master he survives an assassination attempt by his brothers after apparent divine intervention by one of the tribal gods. Archeth, following the trail from the port, and Egar, directed by the deity, both head towards Ennishmin.

Ringil, who has become lovers with Seethlaw, learns that the Dwenda aim to re-emerge into the world after instigating a war between the League and the Empire. Seethlaw leads him to Sherrin who is being held captive with the rest of the Ennish human population. She is released into Ringil's custody and he, Seethlaw and a detachment of Dwenda soldiers begin to head south. They encounter Egar at an inn and his presence leads Ringil to turn against Seethlaw. They escape on a river and arrive in a small village, where Archeth and the Imperial troops who accompanied her are searching for signs of the Dwenda. After an initial confrontation, the Imperials agree to join them in making a stand against the Dwenda. The Dwenda attack and in the ensuing battle, most of the Imperials are killed. Ringil kills Seethlaw himself, and leaves with Sherrin to return her to her family after he bids farewell to Archeth and Egar, who also survive the battle.
