= Altered Carbon: Resleeved =

2020 Japanese animated film

- Official release poster

Japanese name
- Kanji: オルタード・カーボン：リスリーブド
Transcriptions
- Revised Hepburn: Orutādo kābon: Risurībudo
- Directed by: Takeru Nakajima; Yoshiyuki Okada
- Story by: Dai Satō; Tsukasa Kondo
- Based on: Altered Carbon by Richard K. Morgan and Altered Carbon TV series by Laeta Kalogridis
- Produced by: Dai Satō
- Starring: Tatsuhisa Suzuki; Kenji Yamauchi; Rina Satō; Ayaka Asai; Koji Ishii; Kanehira Yamamoto; Jouji Nakata
- Edited by: Shun Tokuda
- Music by: Keigo Hoashi; Kuniyuki Takahashi
- Production company: Anima
- Distributed by: Netflix
- Release date: March 19, 2020
- Running time: 74 minutes
- Country: Japan
- Language: Japanese

Altered Carbon: Resleeved (Japanese: オルタード・カーボン：リスリーブド, Hepburn: Orutādo kābon: Risurībudo) is a 2020 Japanese anime film that is a spin-off of Netflix's Altered Carbon television series. The film is directed by Jō Nakajima and written by Dai Satō and Tsukasa Kondo. Set 253 years before the main events of season 1, and 283 years before the events of season 2, Takeshi Kovacs, on the planet Latimer, must protect a tattooist while investigating the death of a yakuza boss alongside a no-nonsense CTAC.

Altered Carbon: Resleeved was released on March 19, 2020, on Netflix and received mixed reviews from critics. The animation was praised, but the characters and plot received negative criticism.

== Plot ==
On planet Latimer, a young girl, Holly, is being chased by yakuza. She reaches a club, where they finally catch her, but are killed by a ninja. As the ninja is about to kill Holly, he is fought off by Takeshi Kovacs in a new sleeve that he received after a needlecast. Takeshi and Holly speak with Hideki Tanaseda, a yakuza clan head, who wants Takeshi to protect Holly and find out how and why his younger brother died. Holly escapes, but runs into Gena of the UN's CTAC. Takeshi intervenes, CTAC reinforcements arrive, but both parties are ambushed by ninjas. Takeshi and Gena kill all the ninja. They, along with Holly are the only survivors. Holly reveals that ninjas were sent by Shinji, who was planning a coup in the Mizumoto syndicate.

The three head to the Mizumoto syndicate's headquarters and the oldest luxury hotel on Latimer, the Wild Geese. There they are met by Ogai, the AI butler of the hotel. Shinji arrives, showing relief that Holly is alive. He gives Holly's bodyguards, Takeshi and Gena, their most expensive room in the hotel. In the Mizumoto tattoo room, where Holly continues to ink Shinji, Takeshi speaks with Genzo, who explains that Tanaseda was their founder's son. Genzo also explains the Mizumoto tradition: during their boss' succession, the outgoing one is killed using a programmed death system embedded in their tattoos. Meanwhile, Gena reports to CTAC and is revealed to be Reileen Kawahara. Takeshi reports to Tanaseda, who asks him to continue protecting Holly until the succession.

Takeshi finds Holly watching an old memory of her parents' sleeves being murdered. She tells him that she needs the Mizumoto clan's help finding their stacks. While traveling to Genzo, Holly, Takeshi, and Gena are accompanied by yakuza guards. They are attacked again by two ninja in bulletproof armor, who kill all the yakuza and stab Gena. Ogai activates the hotel's defense system to defend them. Holly reveals that a former tattooist, Margot, created the yakuza's programmed death ritual tattoos.

Later, Gena hears Takeshi singing and realizes that he is her brother, but does not reveal herself. Takeshi speaks with Tanaseda, and after mentioning Genzo's laugh, Tanaseda discovers something and gives new orders to Takeshi, which he carries out, confirming Tanaseda's suspicions. On the day of the succession, Shinji orders the ninja to kill Holly, Takeshi and Gena. Genzo arrives shortly after and tells Shinji the succession will happen early. Holly drugs Shinji, knocking him out. Takeshi, Gena, and yakuza guards are surrounded by ninja. Takeshi promises to tell the yakuza the truth after they defeat the ninja.

On the succession stage, Genzo is killed by his tattoo. Tanaseda appears in the hologram crowd, revealing that Shinji and Genzo are the same person, his father and Founder of the syndicate, and that he has been overwriting new bosses' stacks for generations. Following orders, Ogai removes the audience, and the Founder continues the ceremony. He discovers Holly trying to activate the tattoo's destruction program. She reveals that she knows he has her parents stacks. The Founder produces the two stacks and destroys them. Yakuza members arrive at the ceremony with Takeshi and Gena, knowing everything. The Founder dons a power suit and kill the yakuza detail. A battle ensues. Ogai is unable to turn against the syndicate's head due to constraints in his programming. Tanaseda arrives in person and proves to Ogai that the person in Shinji's sleeve is not the rightful leader. Ogai uses the ceremony's firework system to attack the Founder. In his weakened state, Takeshi and Gena manage to destroy his armor. Takeshi wins a fist fight against him. Holly activates the tattoo. He begs Tanaseda for help, who shoots his stack.

Gena (who had received orders to "get rid of Holly") reports to CTAC that her mission is complete and leaves. Ogai addresses Holly as Margot and asks if she wants to change to a younger sleeve as she does. Holly decides not to, so that Takeshi and Gena can recognize her if they meet again. Takeshi speaks with Tanaseda, who advises that there are more jobs to complete.

== Cast ==
Character	Japanese voice actor	English dubbing actor
Takeshi Kovacs / "Ken Kakura"	Tatsuhisa Suzuki	Ray Chase
Hideki Tanaseda	Kenji Yamauchi	Doug Stone
"Gena" / Reileen Kawahara	Rina Satō	Elizabeth Maxwell
Holly Togram	Ayaka Asai	Brittany Cox
Genzo	Koji Ishii	Jamieson Price
Shinji	Kanehira Yamamoto	Kaiji Tang
Ogai	Jouji Nakata	Chris Conner

Trevor Devall, Richard Epcar, Doug Erholtz, Todd Haberkorn, Kyle Hebert, Julie Ann Taylor, and Ezra Weisz provided additional voices in the English version. Yuina Itō provided additional voices in the Japanese version.

== Reception ==
On Rotten Tomatoes, Altered Carbon: Resleeved has an approval rating of 60% based on reviews from five critics.

David Griffin of IGN gave the film 6 out of 10 and stated, "Altered Carbon: Resleeved is a diverting entry in the Takeshi Kovacs saga that excels in the action department while neglecting to fully develop its main characters in a way that makes a lasting impact." John Serba of Decider gave the film a positive review and stated, "Altered Carbon: Resleeved won't knock anyone's socks off, but it effectively pleases newcomers and hardcores alike." Courtney Lanning of the Arkansas Democrat-Gazette recommended the film as a "solid watch for fans of the live-action series. It expands the universe a little bit in some pleasant ways." Michael Ahr of Den of Geek gave the film 3.5 out of 5 and stated, "The techno-orientalism aspects of the Altered Carbon universe serve this anime version well despite its predictable storyline."

Paul Tassi of Forbes gave the film a negative review and stated, "Perhaps the weirdest part about Altered Carbon: Resleeved is its non-traditional, three-dimensional animation style that make it look like a video game you cannot interact with. Its action soars, but its story and writing fall flat." Hogan Reviews gave the film 3 out of 5 and stated, "There were some well animated fight scenes, but there was also some poor writing and characterization, as well as plenty of "janky" animation in between the good bits."
