= Thin Air (Morgan novel) =

2018 novel by Richard K. Morgan

- First edition
- Author: Richard K. Morgan
- Cover artist: Christian McGrath
- Language: English
- Genre: Dystopian cyberpunk military science fiction
- Published: 2018 (Gollancz)
- Publication place: United Kingdom
- Media type: Print, ebook, audiobook
- Pages: 544 (1st edition hardcover)
- ISBN: 978-0575075146
- OCLC: 1050978077
- Preceded by: Black Man / Thirteen
- Followed by: Sequel being written

Thin Air is a dystopian cyberpunk military science fiction novel by Richard K. Morgan first published in 2018. Set in the same reality as his 2007 novel Black Man (published as Thirteen or Th1rte3n in the United States), it is set "well over a century" later than the earlier novel, with all the action taking place on Mars, whereas Black Man / Thirteen is set on Earth.

== Plot ==
Protagonist Hakan Veil was genetically engineered from childhood to be a "hibernoid", a genetically enhanced and deeply augmented human essentially sold into indentured servitude at conception, when the conditioning and modification processes begin. This process and the extent of their integration is so taxing that those who undergo the treatments must spend four months of every [Earth] year asleep in order for their minds and bodies to cope with the tremendous strains that result. Bred to be a crisis commando, Veil and those like him are referred to as Overriders or "Black Hatch Men", used as a last resort measure to protect the bottom line for companies who can afford to hire them. As an Overrider, Veil is conditioned to view saving human life as a secondary concern in favor of monetary assets and commodities like spaceships or freighters and their cargo. Overriders are so fierce and so violent in the execution of their duties, they've taken on an almost mythical status in society, their exploits elevated to sensationalized "boogey man" stories worthy of being syndicated into a popular program, a tagline for which is repeated throughout the novel: "Don't wake the Overrider", as it is understood just how dangerous they are.

Veil was fired after many years of service and countless missions for a private military contractor, exiled to Mars after the "failure" of his final mission in which he not only refused to kill the daughter of a public figure, but ensured her escape and eventual return to her family. Exploiting loopholes in the decommissioning process, Veil begins his exile to Mars fully intact, retaining nearly all of his military-grade augmentations including his AI combat and analysis system. He works as muscle-for-hire to pay for his four-month hibernation, as his augmented physiology still requires him to go into stasis. Veil dislikes being marooned on Mars, but he knows all the players, and at some point or another, has done work for each of them. He would like more than anything to return to Earth, but the expense of such travel is no longer within his reach; he can barely afford to pay the mortgage on his small living space while also paying the storage fees for the cryopod he needs for his annual hibernation period.

At the novel's opening, Veil has just come out of a hibernation cycle and is "running hot", an idiom for the physical and biological state his body is in upon waking. Overriders are an emergency measure, and as such, need to be at peak performance the moment they are activated so everything from physical strength, metabolism, endorphin production, and even aggressive tendencies are amped up to extremely high levels.

Veil's first course of action after waking is to take care of unfinished business from before he was forced to go into hibernation. A stripper/prostitute client was brutally murdered by her boss for stealing, even after Veil had negotiated for her safety, made reparations, and given her assurances she would be safe. Now, freshly awake, he is anxious to settle things properly with the one responsible; a task he performs savagely and efficiently in the middle of a busy night club in front of witnesses. As a result, he is picked up by local BPD (Bradbury Police Department) law enforcement for questioning.

While in holding, Veil sees a news story saying that United Nations officials have sent investigators to Mars to look into irregularities in a local lottery system. The story makes it clear that these visits are not only unwelcome by Mars, but thoroughly disruptive for everyone on the planet regardless of which side of the law they choose to operate, due to the scrutiny. It is revealed the Veil has a loose contract with a newer branch of the Chinese triads, which is trying to establish a foothold in the area, taking over new territory and fending off attacks with Veil's assistance.

Veil, already in trouble, agrees to work with the auditors in exchange for his release, as local law enforcement does not want to spend its time "babysitting" someone from Earth who only seems to make life on Mars more difficult. His only point of contact is police captain Nikki Chakana. Veil is informed of an audit from the Colonial Oversight Initiative (COLIN for short), and Chakana is tasked with escorting a diplomat from Earth named Madison Madekwe. Too worried about the local crime and "real" issues to care about a diplomatic problem with a distant, loathed oversight body, Chakana agrees to let Veil go as long as he acts as Madekwe's bodyguard during her stay.

Veil meets Madekwe as she arrives on Mars and while the two chat, Madekwe reveals she is actually there investigating lottery fraud. The planetary lottery is a key element in the story. Life on Mars is hard, and many turn to crime to get the money for a trip back to Earth ("A Ticket Home", in the book). The lottery is a legitimate way to send people back to Earth, set up by COLIN mostly to keep the population hopeful. Madekwe reveals a lottery winner named Pablo Torres (A.K.A. Pavel Torres) has gone missing, and COLIN is worried about fraud being connected to the lottery by his killer. Veil starts the Torres investigation by contacting a few friends, including a hacker known as The Goat God, and discovers Torres is either dead or thoroughly "unpersoned" by another power he might have upset, though the only concrete lead he can acquire is the name of Torres' girlfriend, Nina Uchimara. After Veil questions Uchimara over a pipe of highly potent THC-laced narcotics, she makes it clear she is attracted to dangerous men, and they have sex. In the hazy afterglow and coming down from the drugs, Uchimara gets angry at Veil and kicks him out when he continues to press her with questions about Torres and activities he may have been involved in that could have led to his death. Veil returns to his fortified home. During the night he is assaulted by a team with military-grade equipment that would not be available to street-level gangs on Mars. Veil survives the assault easily as the assailants were unprepared for an encounter with an Overrider still "running hot" and looking for a good fight. Veil meets Chakana's response team afterwards and learns that Madekwe was abducted in the early morning from a travel terminal by a team like the one that attacked him.

Veil does the legwork on Madekwe's abduction. Captured footage shows a team that must be military- or corporate-trained. The Goat God can only tell Veil so much about the footage he has already acquired and dissected himself, although he explains that the team was using shock and terror tactics to mask their clean extraction job. During Veil's investigation, he meets with another old friend who is retired now, and married to one of the colony overseers under the main colony director, Mulholland. It is apparent to both of them that Mulholland is corrupt. While Veil is initially suspicious, he comes to the conclusion his retired friend cannot do much to hurt him. After chasing a few leads, he is attacked by a corporate clean-up squad out in Gingrich Field; they are sloppy and one of them is killed by her own team's incompetence. When he begins running out of leads, The Goat God reaches him with a name: Hidalgo.

The Goat God explains to Veil the rough history of Hidalgo as a big-shot gangster back on Earth who has been making a name for himself on Mars by outsmarting law enforcement and encroaching on the territories of rival gangs. He is the strongest suspect for Madekwe's abduction as his activities are related to the irregularities she was sent to investigate. As Veil goes to track him down, he is captured by Allauca, the wife of his retired friend, and some of her henchmen. She tells him Torres really did die and his death was simply an accident. Veil manages to escape, killing nearly all of his captors including Allauca, only to have the Marshall's service swoop in at the end. The Marshalls recover Veil, offer him aid and a safe place to recover from his injuries. Veil negotiates some upgrades to his internal systems in exchange for the promise of giving them Hidalgo and allowing the Marshall's service to take all the credit. The Marshall's service agrees to this, and to spreading false reports that Veil died at the scene.

Having recovered from his injuries and received his upgraded internal systems, Veil renews the hunt for Hidalgo, who has Madekwe. Veil returns to see Nina Uchimara because during his convalescence he remembers that she had said something that revealed she had a closer connection to Hidalgo than she had intended to let on. Uchimara confirms that she has known Hidalgo for some time. Veil convinces her that what Hidalgo has planned for Mars is in no one's best interest. She agrees to be part of a plan to draw Hidalgo, or at least some of his closer associates, out of hiding.

Veil lets word spread that Nina Uchimara is being targeted by local law enforcement for her connection to Hidalgo, counting on him taking steps to either intervene or silence her before she can talk to the authorities about what she knows. Veil, working with the Marshall's service sets up a sting operation outside the contact's apartment building ready to apprehend whomever Hidalgo sends for her with the hopes of getting even closer to him and his capture. Veil's plan works but also comes with a shock. Hidalgo sent professionals to retrieve and or kill the contact, and one of them turns out to be Madison Madekwe in full tactical gear and armed for an assault. Thinking quickly, Veil rushes in before the Marshalls can be given the order to spring their trap. Veil kills most of the retrieval team with a shotgun, leaving Madekwe the only one standing, shocked and surprised to see him still alive. The two make a quick escape from the sting operation while Veil begins to put pieces together starting with the fact that Madison Madekwe is not a simple COLIN executive sent to Mars to investigate corruption, and more importantly, was not actually kidnapped at all, but rather staged the whole incident as a means of getting in contact with her real objective, Hidalgo.

Veil realizes that Madison Madekwe and Hidalgo are both covert operatives for Navy SOC (special operations command) and were sent to Mars at different times to enact plans that would eventually lead to Earth gaining greater control over Mars, its people, and industry. It turns out that Hidalgo was part of a team sent to Mars 14 (Earth) years prior as part of a failed mission that resulted in him and his team being abandoned by the Navy to distance themselves from the fallout. Hidalgo and a handful of his surviving team used their skills and remaining resources to infiltrate as much of Mars' infrastructure as they could, including the underworld. Hidalgo's only drive during that time was to gather as many resources and intelligence as possible to make the failure of his original mission a possibility once again, to give Earth cause to impose its authority over Mars. Madekwe was sent in covertly by the Navy, under the guise of a COLIN executive to retrieve Hidalgo and what information he had to make an overthrow of Mars possible.

Veil is now at a crossroads. He can turn Madekwe over to COLIN as promised in exchange for a ride back to Earth, hindering Hidalgo's operations on Mars and effectively ending the Navy's attempted coup of the planet's established government. However, Madekwe makes a counter offer. If Veil helps her and Hidalgo complete their mission, the Navy will get Mars, and as a reward, give Veil his passage to Earth instead. He hates life on Mars and wants to go back to Earth, but the idea of the Navy instituting martial law on Mars and effectively sentencing its population into indentured servitude to Earth would make him no better than the people who used him as a disposable commodity during his years as an Overrider.

Veil has a decision to make and not much time to act. He decides that he needs to know who all the players are, and the only one he has not dealt with in person is Hidalgo himself. Veil convinces Madekwe to arrange a meeting between himself and Hidalgo to discuss exactly what plans are in store for Mars. She helps him get in touch with Hidalgo and the pieces begin to fall into place.

Hidalgo reveals that Torres' death was, in fact, an accident: a result of his being high while trying to rob a pharmaceutical office to acquire a set of faulty cosmetics. Mars-manufactured products are sold at a premium on Earth, but these tainted cosmetics were made cheaply on Earth then shipped to Mars for packaging as Mars-based products are sold at a premium markup for their "exotic" nature. Using this evidence as leverage, the Navy could blackmail the planet's government into relinquishing control to them. Exposure would lead to the distrust and eventual collapse of Mars' entire economic structure for producing counterfeit merchandise, losing all independent corporate investment and support.

Veil discovers Hidalgo has been setting the ground for a COLIN military take-over of Mars to put an end to Mulholland's corporate exploitation and corruption of the colony, and the discovery of the product scam was going to be the catalyst. Torres' value to Hidalgo was twofold. Not only did he know where to secure samples of the fake cosmetics that could be used to blackmail Mulholland, Torres and his then-girlfriend had sampled the products themselves and retained some of it in their skin. However, on the night Torres was to help Hidalgo break into the production facility to steal the products, Torres showed up high on the roof of the building and began raving about the evils of corporate greed. During his rant, Torres lost his footing, falling to his death and prompting a hasty withdrawal by Hidalgo without the cosmetics. It turns out that Torres' death was inconsequential save for the fact that the investigation it triggered brought authorities too close to Hidalgo's real plan and afforded the Navy a usable cover to insert more covert agents to assist him. In the interim, all remaining samples of the tainted cosmetics were either destroyed or removed from Hidalgo's reach, leaving him with nothing to use as leverage.

Veil entices Hidalgo into believing that his plan is still salvageable due to the fact that while samples of the incriminating pharmaceuticals no longer exist, traces of what he needs can still be found in Torres' ex-girlfriend whom Veil is happy to produce.

At a meeting where Hidalgo, Madekwe, and some local hired thugs are to be brought to Torre's girlfriend, Veil allows Hidalgo to be killed and Madekwe to be taken captive by local Mars interests from both sides of the law, as they agree that no matter what their differences, Mars belongs to the people of Mars and no one else. However, as Veil, Madekwe, and the heads of both Mars factions return to Bradbury, their vehicle is attacked by a SOC task force to retrieve Madewke and complete the mission. It turns out that Hidalgo's initial plan for the Navy is still a priority and Madekwe was not there to assist him, but rather to take it over.

Veil is captured and brought to Governor Mulholland's mansion and turned over to Captain Chakana on numerous charges of murder and crimes against the colony. The Governor is happy to let the Navy take over Mars as they have offered him a deal to escape prosecution for his corruption, in exchange for enacting protocols that hand over control to the Navy legally. However Chakana has a change of heart and discreetly frees Veil before helping him kill Mulholland, his security, Madewke, and her SOC forces in a fast and bloody shootout while in the governor's office.

Veil is seriously injured by the end of this and wakes up several days later in a hospital under Chakana's guard. He recovers and has something of a celebration with the Goat God. At the end of the novel, Veil leaves the bar and walks home in the rain, understanding that Mars, though a rough place, is where he belongs.

== Major themes ==
Morgan describes a Mars established as a colony for the benefit of Earth-based megacorporations, where potentially-dangerous industry can occur with minimal risk to humankind. Several streets on Mars are named for Chicago School economists and conservative politicians; in an interview Morgan stated that "neoliberalism has set loose a vast capital investment potential that certainly accommodates the necessary scale and ambition, but it is, of course, utterly rapacious, anti-humane and self-interested at the same time." The protagonist's view of Mars repeatedly critiques the "Martian High Frontier Myth", reflecting a theme common to Morgan's works, of grandness left to decay:

There is a central conceit that I keep ... returning to ... of something grand and worthwhile being abandoned by vicious and stupid men in favour of short-term profit and tribal hegemony. ... So also with Thin Air — the landscape is littered with the markers of a retreat from the grand scheme of terraforming and building a home for humanity on Mars, in favour of an ultraprofitable corporate stasis and an ongoing lie of highly emotive intangibles sold to the general populace in lieu of actual progress.

With Martian terraforming having been partly abandoned, the atmosphere is described as "four percent Earth sea level standard"; the colonists of Mars are of mainly Andean and Himalayan stock.

== Development history ==
Morgan has described that some of the vague concept of Thin Air had been in his head since around the time Black Man / Thirteen and that the reference to "a character on Mars, a hibernoid PI who's hard as nails" in that novel was a template for Hakan Veil. Morgan was embarrassed to describe that new-fatherhood meant that he had not found time to read Kim Stanley Robinson's Mars trilogy before writing Thin Air, despite having intended to.

=== Publication history ===
- 2018, English: UK and US, Germany, Spain: Del Rey Books, published 23 October 2018, hardcover, ISBN 978-0345493125
- 2018, English: UK and US: Gollancz, published 25 October 2018, paperback, ISBN 978-0575088566
- 2018, English: Worldwide: Gollancz, published 25 October 2018, ebook, ASIN B079RMQJR1
- 2018, English: Multiple territories: Orion Publishing Group, published 25 October 2018, audiobook, ASIN B07BZVQSM4 (UK), ASIN B07BZHYBH9 (US), ASIN B07CBM892V (AU), ASIN B07BZMMVM7 (DE), ASIN B07BZQK2TC (FR), ASIN B07F8BGVH6 (JP)
- 2018, English: Canada: Gollancz, published 25 October 2018, ebook ASIN B078W529FR
- 2018, English: Canada: Orion Publishing Group, published 25 October 2018, audiobook, ASIN B078W529FR
- 2018, English: Multiple territories: Gollancz, published 25 October 2018, hardcover, ISBN 978-0575075146
- 2018, English: Australia, China: Gollancz, published 30 October 2018, paperback, ISBN 978-0575088566
- 2018, English: India: Gollancz, published 31 October 2018, paperback, ISBN 978-0575088566
- 2019, English: Canada: Gollancz, expected 5 March 2019, hardcover, ISBN 978-0575075146
- 2019: German: Germany, as Mars Override: Heyne Verlag, expected 10 June 2019, paperback, ISBN 978-3453320222
- 2019: German: Germany, as Mars Override: Heyne Verlag, expected 10 June 2019, ebook, ASIN B07K26NWG1
- 2019, English: Japan: Gollancz, expected 11 June 2019, paperback, ISBN 978-0575088573
- 2019, English: France, Spain: Gollancz, expected 13 June 2019, paperback, ISBN 978-0575088573
- 2019, English: Canada: Gollancz, expected 13 August 2019, paperback, ISBN 978-0575088573
