= Altered Carbon (TV series) =

Science-fiction television series

- Genre: Cyberpunk
- Created by: Laeta Kalogridis
- Based on: Altered Carbon by Richard K. Morgan
- Starring: Joel Kinnaman; James Purefoy; Martha Higareda; Chris Conner; Dichen Lachman; Ato Essandoh; Kristin Lehman; Trieu Tran; Renée Elise Goldsberry; Anthony Mackie; Lela Loren; Simone Missick; Dina Shihabi; Torben Liebrecht
- Composers: Jeff Russo; Jordan Gagne
- Country of origin: United States
- Original language: English
- No. of seasons: 2
- No. of episodes: 18

Production
- Executive producers: Brian Nelson; James Middleton; David Ellison; Dana Goldberg; Marcy Ross; Mike Medavoy; Arnold W. Messer; Bradley J. Fischer; James Vanderbilt; Nick Hurran; Russel Friend; Garrett Lerner; Steve Blackman; Alison Schapker; Laeta Kalogridis
- Producer: John G. Lenic
- Running time: 46–66 minutes
- Production companies: Virago Productions; Mythology Entertainment; Phoenix Pictures; Skydance Television

Original release
- Network: Netflix
- Release: February 2, 2018 – February 27, 2020

Altered Carbon is an American cyberpunk television series created by Laeta Kalogridis and based on the 2002 novel of the same title by English author Richard K. Morgan. In a world where consciousness can be transferred to different bodies, Takeshi Kovacs, a former soldier turned investigator, is released from prison in order to solve a murder. The first season consists of ten episodes and premiered on Netflix on February 2, 2018. On July 27, 2018, the series was renewed for a second season of eight episodes, which was released on February 27, 2020, with an anime film set before the first season released on March 19, 2020. Though the series received generally positive reviews, it was canceled after two seasons.

== Synopsis ==
The series starts 360 years in the future, with most episodes of the first season set in the year 2384 in a futuristic metropolis known as Bay City. In the future, a person's memories and consciousness (termed digital human freight, or DHF) are recorded onto a disk-shaped device called a cortical stack, which is implanted in the vertebrae at the back of the neck. These storage devices are of alien design and have been reverse-engineered and mass-produced but can only be made from the material on Harlan's World. Physical human or synthetic bodies are called "sleeves" and stacks can be transferred to new bodies after death, but a person can still be killed if their stack is destroyed and there is no backup. Only the wealthiest, known as "Meths" in reference to Methuselah, have the means to change bodies through clones and remote storage of their consciousness in satellites, so they never have to die of old age before being resleeved.

Takeshi Kovacs, a political operative with mercenary skills, is the sole surviving soldier of the Envoys, a rebel group defeated in an uprising against the new world order. In the first season, set 250 years after the Envoys are destroyed, his stack is pulled out of prison by 300-year-old Meth Laurens Bancroft, one of the wealthiest men in the settled worlds. Bancroft offers him the chance to solve a murder—Bancroft's own—to get a new shot at life.

The second season takes place in the early 2410s, set 30 years after the first season: Kovacs, now in a new sleeve, continues to search for his lost love and Envoy leader Quellcrist Falconer.

== Cast ==
=== Main ===
- Joel Kinnaman (season 1; flashbacks season 2), Anthony Mackie (season 2) and Ray Chase (Resleeved) as Takeshi "Tak" Kovacs, the last Envoy, of an elite rebel group defeated 250 years prior to the start of the series. Kinnaman also portrays Elias Ryker, a police officer and Kristin Ortega's former lover, whose "sleeve" or body Kovacs inhabits during season 1. Mackie serves as a new host body for Kovacs in season 2.
- James Purefoy as Laurens Bancroft (season 1), one of the wealthiest men alive, who lives in a skyscraper above the clouds and out of the reach of everyday people, ruthlessly powerful and wanting to exert control on those around him
- Martha Higareda as Kristin Ortega (season 1; guest season 2), a smart and tough lieutenant in the Bay City Police Department who comes from a religious Mexican American family of cops
- Chris Conner as Edgar Poe (seasons 1–2), an artificial intelligence (AI) that takes the likeness of Edgar Allan Poe and runs the hotel that serves as Kovacs's base of operations in Bay City
- Dichen Lachman (season 1; guest season 2) and Elizabeth Maxwell (Resleeved) as Reileen Kawahara / Gina, Kovacs's sister, who shared his violent childhood, who joined the Envoys at the same time as he did, and apparently perished when the uprising was put down
- Ato Essandoh as Vernon Elliot (season 1; guest season 2), a former Protectorate marine whose wife was imprisoned and daughter murdered
- Kristin Lehman as Miriam Bancroft and Naomi Bancroft (season 1), Laurens' wife who has her own motivations, and their daughter who steals her mother's sleeve. Lehman said she was "really intrigued and challenged" to play the character of Miriam, considering it different from her other work. Her background as a dancer helped her prepare for the role. Of the character's sexuality, "She has commodified her sexuality and I was interested in exploring that side of the character."
- Trieu Tran as Mister Leung / Ghostwalker (season 1), a killer and "fixer" who kills and solves problems for a mysterious employer
- Renée Elise Goldsberry as Quellcrist "Quell" Falconer (née Nadia Makita) (seasons 1–2), a master strategist and scientist, the creator of Stacks and leader of the Envoys. She was seemingly killed when the rebellion was put down, additionally appearing in Kovacs's flashbacks and hallucinations.
- Lela Loren as Danica Harlan (season 2), the governor of Harlan's World and the daughter of its founder, Konrad Harlan
- Simone Missick as Trepp (season 2), a bounty hunter
- Dina Shihabi as Dig 301 (season 2), an AI archaeologue who befriends Poe
- Torben Liebrecht as Jaeger / Ivan Carrera (season 2), Kovacs's commanding officer in the CTAC Praetorian and surrogate father, later the leader of an elite fighting force called The Wedge operating on Harlan's World. Daniel Bernhardt portrays the character's previous sleeve in a recurring capacity in seasons 1–2.

=== Recurring ===
- Byron Mann as Mercenary Kovacs (season 1; flashbacks season 2) and Dimitri Kadmin (season 1)
- Tamara Taylor as Oumou Prescott (season 1)
- Marlene Forte as Alazne Ortega (season 1)
- Tahmoh Penikett as Dimitri (season 1)
- Matt Frewer as Carnage (season 1)
- Hiro Kanagawa as Captain Tanaka (season 1)
- Hayley Law as Lizzie Elliot (seasons 1–2)
- Will Yun Lee as Original Takeshi Kovacs / "Kovacs Prime" (seasons 1–2)
- Adam Busch as Mickey (season 1)
- Michael Shanks as Horace Axley (season 2)
- Sen Mitsuji as Tanaseda Yukito (season 2)
- Waleed Zuaiter as Samir Abboud (season 1)
- James Saito (season 2) and Doug Stone (Resleeved) as Tanaseda Hideki
- Neal McDonough as Konrad Harlan (season 2)

== Development ==
=== Production ===
Netflix ordered the series in January 2016, fifteen years after Laeta Kalogridis optioned the novel with the intent of making a feature film. According to Kalogridis, the complex nature of the novel and its R-rated material meant that it was a tough sell for studios before Netflix ordered the series. The show was one of a number of dramas commissioned in short order by Netflix, which had committed to spending $5 billion on original content.

Kalogridis wrote the script and served as executive producer and showrunner. Steve Blackman served as co-showrunner. David Ellison, Dana Goldberg and Marcy Ross of Skydance Television also served as producers, as well as Brad Fischer and James Vanderbilt of Kalogridis' Mythology Entertainment. Miguel Sapochnik directed the pilot episode. Morgan served as a consultant during the show's production.

The series was reportedly the most expensive Netflix production to date. The production costs were not disclosed but Kinnaman said it had "bigger budget than the first three seasons of Game of Thrones".

Ann Foley served as costume designer. The production crew fitted about 2,000 costumers and custom made at least 500 pieces for the show, and emphasized "grounded" looks for future fashion but figured in specific details, such as a unique palette for Meth characters and subtle costume changes when different people are inhabiting the same sleeve.

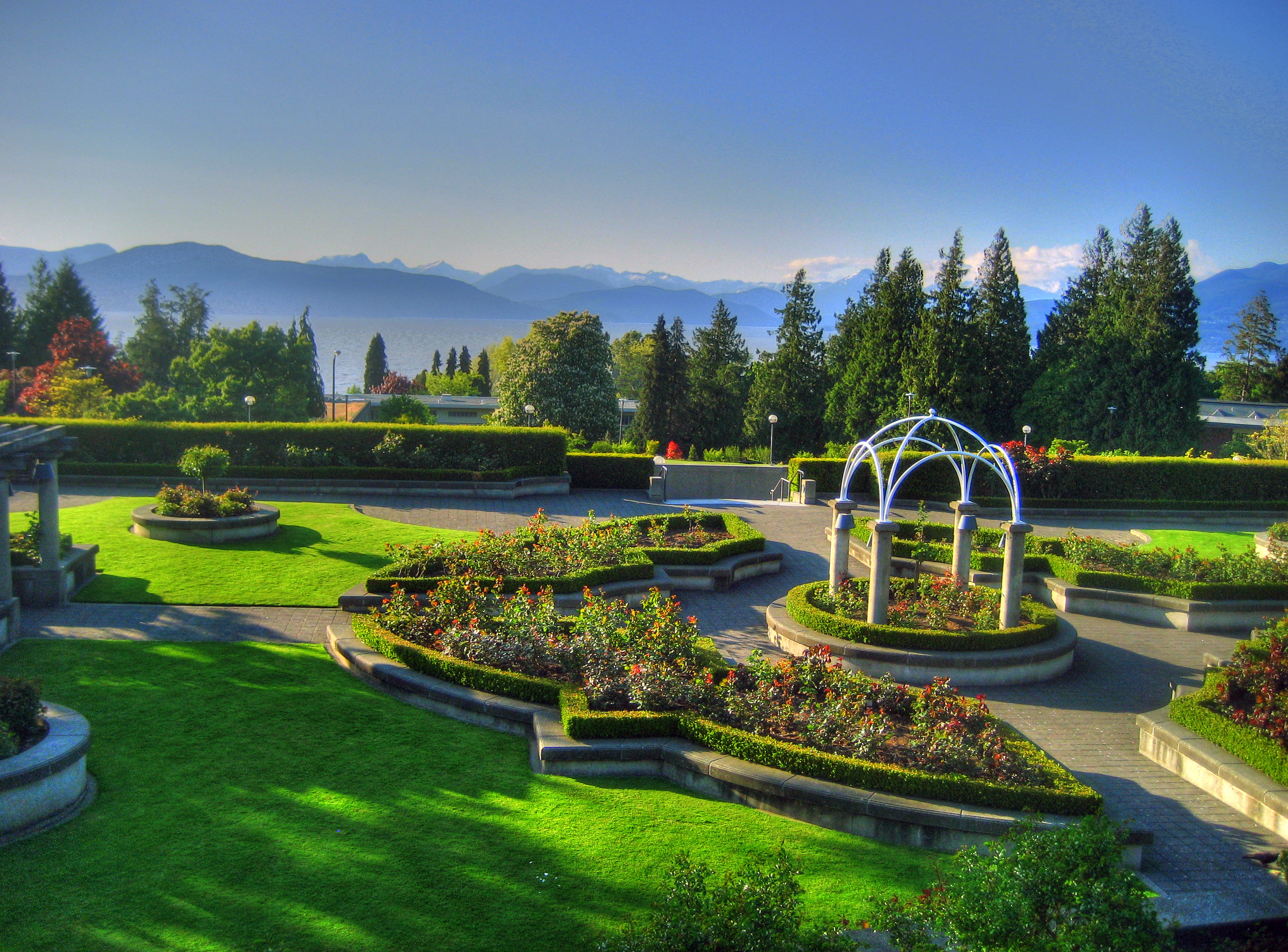
University of British Columbia Rose Garden

The series is produced in Vancouver, British Columbia, Canada. Laurens Bancroft's gardens was filmed in University of British Columbia Rose Garden and the lobby of the Marine Building served as Bancroft's home. The old Canada Post building was used as the location of The Wei Clinic, where Kovacs was tortured. Scenes with the Envoys were filmed on the Sea to Sky Gondola suspension bridge, in Squamish. Other Vancouver locations include the Convention Centre's West Building, the visitor centre at VanDusen Botanical Garden, the UBC Museum of Anthropology and The Qube.

The series contains references to several earlier cyberpunk classics, such as Blade Runner and Ghost in the Shell, as well as several literary works, such as the stories of Edgar Allan Poe.

Altered Carbon was renewed for a second season in July 2018. Anthony Mackie took over the lead role of Takeshi Kovacs, replacing the first season lead star Joel Kinnaman. Additionally, Alison Schapker joined the series as co-showrunner alongside Laeta Kalogridis. On May 23, 2019, it was announced that Schapker would be the primary showrunner for the series, replacing Laeta Kalogridis who is still credited as an executive producer.

On August 26, 2020, Netflix canceled the series after two seasons. The decision had been made in April and was not related to COVID-19, but a result of the standard process used by Netflix to calculate the viewership versus the renewal costs.

=== Adaptation of the novels ===
==== First season ====
The first season is based on Richard Morgan's 2002 novel Altered Carbon. While most of the major plot points in the book are retained, the adaptation featured several major changes for characters and organizations. In the novel, the Envoys are elite soldiers of the United Nations Protectorate based on Earth, quite the opposite of the freedom-fighting rebels of the show, originating from Harlan's World, where Kovacs was born.

In the book, Kovacs was imprisoned for his freelance work after leaving the Envoys, while in the show, Kovacs is a captured rebel. The character of Reileen Kawahara in the novel was merely Kovacs's ruthless underworld boss and had no blood relation with him, in contrast to their sibling relationship in the show. The Envoy who trained Kovacs in the book was Virginia Vidaura. The show's Vidaura is only a minor character. Instead, his trainer is given the name and backstory of Quellcrist Falconer, who in book three is the historical messiah-like figure. Falconer's rebellion occurred not during Kovacs's training, as in the show, but long before Kovacs was born in the books.

The Hendrix is an AI character in the novel; it runs the hotel and takes the form of Jimi Hendrix. Hendrix's estate declined to license his image for the television series because of its violence. Instead, showrunner Kalogridis chose the likeness of Edgar Allan Poe and a Victorian era hotel for the replacement Poe character and said it would juxtapose well with the futuristic Bay City.

=== Anime film ===
On November 7, 2018, Netflix announced a spin-off anime film serving to "expand the universe" of the series and new elements of the story mythology was in active development. Titled Altered Carbon: Resleeved, the feature uses character designs by manga artist Yasuo Ōtagaki, is written by Dai Satō and Tsukasa Kondo, directed by Takeru Nakajima and Yoshiyuki Okada, produced by Anima, and features an original music score by Keigo Hoashi and Kuniyuki Takahashi from Monaca. The film was released on March 19, 2020.

On Rotten Tomatoes, Altered Carbon: Resleeved has an approval rating of 60% based on reviews from 5 critics. David Griffin of IGN gave it 6 out of 10, called it "a diverting entry in the Takeshi Kovacs saga that excels in the action department while neglecting to fully develop its main characters in a way that makes a lasting impact." John Serba of Decider.com wrote: "Resleeved won't knock anyone's socks off, but it effectively pleases newcomers and hardcores alike." Paul Tassi of Forbes said Altered Carbon: Resleeved was "not worth watching, even for fans" comparing it to a video game but without the interactivity.

== Episodes ==
Season	Episodes	Originally released
1	10	February 2, 2018
2	8	February 27, 2020
Resleeved		March 19, 2020

=== Season 1 (2018) ===
No. overall	No. in season	Title	Directed by	Written by	Original release date
1	1	"Out of the Past"	Miguel Sapochnik	Laeta Kalogridis	February 2, 2018
Takeshi Kovacs and a female companion are in a hotel room on a distant planet when they are attacked by Protectorate security forces. They fight back but are overwhelmed and gunned down. 250 years later, Kovacs is resurrected in a new body on Earth, having been traced and bought by a member of the wealthy elite (known as Meths). His buyer, Laurens Bancroft, wants him to investigate his own death, which he believes was a murder. Kovacs is an Envoy, a long-extinct rebel group with incredible abilities of discernment. In exchange for solving the murder, Bancroft promises Kovacs a protectorate pardon and vast wealth. Kovacs is also questioned by Kristen Ortega, a police detective who previously investigated the Bancroft killing and concluded that it was suicide. Ortega is alarmed after discovering Kovacs's identity but is surprised when he tells her that he intends to turn down Bancroft's offer and go back into storage. Kovacs wanders the streets, buys drugs and has visions of his sister. He checks into a hotel run by an AI styled after Edgar Allen Poe, where he is intercepted by a hitman called Dimitri, who appears to know who Kovacs is and intends to kidnap him. The kidnapping is foiled when the hotel intervenes to save its new client. As Kovacs has been gone for 250 years, he believes someone really did kill Bancroft and takes the case.
2	2	"Fallen Angel"	Nick Hurran	Steve Blackman	February 2, 2018
Kovacs meets Prescott, the Bancrofts' lawyer and visits their resurrection facility, where clones of the entire family are kept, to learn more about the case. He questions Laurens about his activities, who takes offense and threatens Kovacs, but offers grudging respect when Kovacs doesn't flinch. Kovacs investigates death threats made against Bancroft and learns the identity of a man who threatened to kill Bancroft in a remarkably similar way to how he died. He visits the man, Vernon Elliot, a former marine who blames Bancroft for assaulting his daughter, Lizzie. Elliot fights Kovacs but is beaten and subdued. Kovacs discovers that Elliot is keeping Lizzie's mind in a virtual environment but she is too traumatised to speak. Lizzie's mother is a hacker and is in prison. Kovacs concludes Elliot didn't kill Bancroft as this would mean abandoning Lizzie. Kovacs discovers Lizzie was a prostitute and Bancroft used to visit her establishment. He goes there and convinces one of the girls, Anemone, to help find information for him, but is attacked after leaving, first by Elliot, then by other thugs, before being arrested by Ortega, who had planted an illegal tracker on him. Kovacs is quickly released and goes back to the hotel, where Mrs. Bancroft is waiting for him and seduces him.
3	3	"In a Lonely Place"	Nick Hurran	Brian Nelson	February 2, 2018
A flashback sequence shows a young woman falling out of the sky into the bay. Poe tells Kovacs that a spy drone was in his room and recorded footage of him with Mrs. Bancroft. Laurens invites Kovacs to a party at the Bancroft mansion. Laurens has invited all the people he suspects could have killed him so that Kovacs can meet and question them. Ortega's mother visits her and over dinner they argue about resurrection technology. Ortega's mother objects to it on religious grounds but as a detective Ortega believes it is invaluable for identifying murderers since the victim can be asked what happened to them. Kovacs decides to hire Elliot to act as his backup at the mansion party, in exchange for which Poe helps Lizzie to recover. Poe reconnects with other AI hoteliers, who haven't seen him for 50 years, however he leaves in disgust when they mock his interest in human beings. At the Bancroft residence, Kovacs talks to guests but doesn't learn anything. When Kovacs sees Bancroft's son, Isaac, bullying some guests, he intervenes and physically restrains him, drawing a rebuke from Prescott. Ortega also attends the party and sees a mysterious figure who doesn't show up on security cameras; when Kovacs is drawn into a gladiatorial fight as part of the evening's entertainment, Ortega intervenes and stops the fight. Kovacs goes back to see Anemone, who agreed to help him but he is betrayed and captured, and Anemone is killed.
4	4	"Force of Evil"	Alex Graves	Russel Friend & Garrett Lerner	February 2, 2018
An unconscious Kovacs is held in a clinic, where his mind is connected to a virtual interrogation room. He is tortured by Dimi the twin, a clone of the man who tried to capture him at the hotel. Dimi believes Kovacs is a cop called Elias Riker. To survive the ordeal, Kovacs recalls his Envoy training by Quellcrist Falconer, who taught him to how to endure virtual torture. Ortega's family prepare a meal at her apartment for Los Muertos. Ortega uses a perp's body as a sleeve for her deceased grandmother, so that she can enjoy the festive meal with her family. At the meal, her family argues over resurrection. Back at the police station, Ortega's grandmother thanks her for the evening but requests that she doesn't spin her back up again. She tries to find more information on the mysterious figure (known as the ghostwalker as he has technology that obscures him from cameras) but to no avail. Kovacs manages to pull himself out of the virtual environment and wakes up. He sees that the clinic has been harvesting Anemone's organs. Kovacs convinces the staff he is a CTAC officer, which scares them into releasing him. Once freed Kovacs grabs his weapons and kills everyone in the clinic. Ortega visits the crime scene and discovers the tracker she had put on Kovacs. She confronts him but when Kovacs threatens to harm Ryker's body she backs off and agrees to tell him the truth about their relationship.
5	5	"The Wrong Man"	Uta Briesewitz	Nevin Densham	February 2, 2018
In a flashback, Elias Ryker beats up and threatens to kill a resurrection officer over the death of a childhood friend, Mary Lou. Ryker believes there is a conspiracy because she cannot be resurrected due to religious protections, but Ryker knew she wasn't religious. Ortega intervenes, releases the officer and persuades Ryker there was no conspiracy and he breaks down. Later, Ryker is arrested for killing the same man although he protests his innocence. In the present, Kovacs and Ortega realise that Ryker was framed for the murder by Dimi the twin and there is a connection to the Bancroft case since the first Dimi at the hotel knew who Kovacs was. After getting a tip from Poe, they go to a fight club called the Fight Drome run by an AI called Carnage. Kovacs is disturbed when he sees his previous body in storage at the arena. Carnage reluctantly shows Kovacs and Ortega recorded footage of Bancroft violently assaulting his son Isaac at the arena. They break into Isaac's home and discover he is secretly making clones of his father so that he can act as him, giving him motive and opportunity to kill his father and replace him. Kovacs and Ortega become lovers, and Ortega tells Kovacs about the ghostwalker she saw at Bancroft's party. At the police station, Kovacs and Ortega have Dimi the twin resleeved and interrogate him, but they get no answers. As they are leaving, Kovacs sees the ghostwalker approach Ortega, her partner and Dimi but too late to do anything. The ghostwalker attacks, Ortega is gravely wounded and her partner is killed.
6	6	"Man with My Face"	Alex Graves	Steve Blackman	February 2, 2018
Kovacs takes Ortega to a hospital and pays for her treatment, including a new cybernetic arm. He visits the Bancrofts and exposes Isaac's cloning; however he realises that Isaac didn't kill his father and just wants his respect. In a rage, Bancroft violently smashes up his cloned body in front of his horrified family before calmly thanking Kovacs for the information. The police chief visits Ortega with flowers but Kovacs deduces that he has been taking bribes from the Meths to not record crimes that could lead back to them. The chief protests that he had no idea they would be attacked, but a furious Ortega beats him and leaves the hospital with Kovacs. Poe continues to make progress with Lizzie, but when Elliot intervenes unexpectedly, she relapses. After realising that the ghostwalker intends to kill him, Dimi the twin flees and gets refuge with Carnage at the Fight Drome, where he acquires Kovacs's previous sleeve. Ortega and Kovacs are ambushed by Dimi and are taken to the Fight Drome, where they are forced to participate in a fight to the death. At first they fight well against Carnage's minions but are surprise-attacked by Dimi using poison blades, who injures both of them. Despite suffering grievous wounds, together Kovacs and Ortega gain the upper hand, killing Dimi for good by ripping out his stack, which Ortega then crushes with her bionic arm. Carnage tries to finish them off, but a mysterious warrior appears and kills multiple guards, causing everyone to panic and flee. The warrior is revealed to be Kovacs's sister, Reileen.
7	7	"Nora Inu"	Andy Goddard	Nevin Densham & Casey Fisher	February 2, 2018
Kovacs is near death from the effects of the poison and Reileen wants to move him into a new sleeve, however she relents when he insists that Ryker's body must be saved. In a flashback, Kovacs and Reileen as children witness their father kill their mother and dispose of her body. Kovacs kills his father to save his younger sister. Kovacs is held captive for his crime and recruited by an officer called Jaeger into CTAC, the protectorate's elite military force. Kovacs is told that Reileen will enjoy a safe upbringing with a loving family however this is a lie. Years later during an operation against Yakuza on Harlan's World, Kovacs encounters Reileen again. Kovacs and Reileen kill both the Yakuza and CTAC to escape together. On the run, they hide deep in the forest and are found by the Envoys, led by Quellcrist Falconer. They join the Envoys and grow closer to the group, but Reileen is conflicted when Quellcrist explains her plan to eliminate resurrection by hacking the DHF signals at the protectorate's central core. After a mission goes wrong and Kovacs is captured by Jaeger, he is saved by Quell. She confides in him that she is the scientist who created DHF and is trying to atone for it. She and Kovacs sleep together. The next morning the Envoys are attacked by CTAC and wiped out. Quell and Reileen try to escape on a shuttle but it is destroyed in mid-air, which Kovacs witnesses. Back in the present, a restored Kovacs figures out that Reileen survived the attack because her DHF was already backed up and therefore she betrayed the Envoys.
8	8	"Clash by Night"	Uta Briesewitz	Brian Nelson	February 2, 2018
Kovacs is distraught by Reileen's treachery. She tells him she didn't want to die for a cause she didn't believe in, she wanted to live instead and in the intervening years, she became a wealthy and powerful meth. Reileen recommended Kovacs to Bancroft to get him out of storage, however she tells him that he must now close the case since it is damaging her interests. The ghostwalker works for Reileen and she threatens the lives of everyone Kovacs knows if he doesn't comply. Kovacs gets Ava Elliot released to help him, although she is sleeved in a male body. Ortega tracks down Kovacs but to save her life from the ghostwalker, Kovacs cruelly dismisses her. At the hotel, Ava is reunited with her family, including Lizzie, who recognises her immediately. Poe plays a card game with another hotel AI and infects it with Rawling virus, the same weapon used to kill the Envoys. Ava then creates fake street camera footage showing Bancroft entering a brothel run by the infected AI. At the Bancroft residence, Kovacs uses the doctored footage as evidence that Bancroft visited the brothel after a business deal, where he got infected with Rawling. The only way to stop the virus spreading was to kill himself. Kovacs implicates family lawyer Prescott, saying she intended to kill Bancroft as she knew his satellite back-up would spread the Rawling to every clone. The family accepts the ruse and Bancroft fires Prescott on the spot, before giving Kovacs his reward and pardon. Ortega uses some of Reileen's DNA from the Fight Drome to track down her cloning facility. The clones wake up and attack Ortega, who shoots them all. Ortega then finds a little girl alone and comforts her, unaware that she is also one of Reileen's sleeves.
9	9	"Rage in Heaven"	Peter Hoar	Russel Friend & Garrett Lerner	February 2, 2018
Kovacs is at Poe's hotel when Ortega staggers through the door wounded. He takes Ortega to his room and tends to her injuries, but eventually realises that she is actually Reileen with Ortega's sleeve. She admits she is holding Ortega captive and has sent Leung (the ghostwalker) to exact revenge on her family for Ortega killing her clones. Kovacs races to Ortega's mother's home but arrives too late to save the family, who are all brutally slain. Kovacs formulates a plan to rescue Ortega and bring down Reileen by infiltrating Head in the Clouds, Reileen's floating base and exclusive pleasure palace. Kovacs initially tries to push everyone away for their own safety but reluctantly accepts their help when they refuse to listen. To evade detection by Leung, Kovacs uses Isaac's cloning machine to make a clone of himself. The cloned Kovacs gets into a car with Mrs Bancroft, drawing Leung away from the hotel. Impersonating a high-ranking military officer, Elliott visits Head in the Clouds, with Kovacs hidden in the car. Kovacs infiltrates Reileen's residence and uploads Rawling virus that destroys all of Reileen's clones. With Elliot as backup, Kovacs confronts Reileen and forces her to confess to everything, hoping that a century in storage prison will restore her humanity. Reileen admits to infecting Bancroft with Stallion virus, which led him to kill a prostitute in a crazed state. Reileen then blackmailed Bancroft into opposing a change in the law that would enable murder victims to testify what happened to them, even if they had religious coding. Bancroft then killed himself to forget about the murder. Mary Lou was a witness and escaped, leaping to her death hoping that she would be found and resurrected, unaware that Reileen secretly recoded every sex worker she employs to give them religious coding. Kovacs's plan goes awry when Reileen's guards arrive and overpower them.
10	10	"The Killers"	Peter Hoar	Laeta Kalogridis & Nevin Densham	February 2, 2018
Ortega is tormented in virtual interrogation by Leung. Leung disappears suddenly and Ortega is pulled out of virtual by Kovacs. Held captive by Reileen, Kovacs is given a gun and told to execute one of his friends. Kovacs points the gun at his own head instead but it is empty. Reileen is dismayed by Kovac's loyalty to people she considers inconsequential, instead of his sister. She dispatches Leung to the Evermore hotel where he kills Mickey and uploads a virus that seemingly destroys Poe. A dying Poe visits Lizzie to say goodbye. Now fully restored and an expert fighter due to Poe's training regime, Lizzie convinces Poe to send her consciousness through the network to Head in the Clouds. Lizzie downloads into a synthetic body and dispatches multiple guards. She saves Kovacs and the others, who begin to fight back. Kovacs confronts his sister while Ortega goes after Leung. The police arrive just as Ortega gets the upper hand against Leung, killing him with his own weapon. Kovacs reluctantly kills Reileen after realising she is beyond saving. Lizzie and the Elliots shut down the main power to Head in the Clouds, causing it to crash. As everyone flees, a broken-hearted Kovacs decides to stay with his sister and dies in the crash. He is awakened in virtual by the authorities, who thank him for exposing Reileen's activities; however they are aware he was illegally double-sleeved. The protectorate will uphold his pardon but only for one person and the other must be terminated. They allow Kovacs to choose which consciousness will survive; Kovacs discusses this with the other Kovacs and they play rock-paper-scissors. Laurens Bancroft is arrested for his actions on Head in the Clouds. Lizzie confirms that Miriam Bancroft was the one who attacked her, after Lizzie had gone to the Bancroft mansion to tell Laurens she was pregnant; Miriam is also arrested and Laurens leaves Isaac in charge of the estate. Kovacs visits Ortega and confirms that he is the same person that was onboard Head in the Clouds. They say goodbye and Kovacs heads off-world.

=== Season 2 (2020) ===
No. overall	No. in season	Title	Directed by	Written by	Original release date
11	1	"Phantom Lady"	Ciaran Donnelly	Laeta Kalogridis	February 27, 2020
30 years after the Bancroft case, Axley, a Meth, locates Kovacs and offers him a job to protect him. Kovacs wakes up in an enhanced sleeve to find Axley and his security murdered, and Kovacs flees. Kovacs finds himself on the planet of Harlan's World, now under the control of Danica, the daughter of Konrad, the founder. Danica is in the process of negotiating a ceasefire between two warring sides over mining access. Kovacs recruits help from Tanaseda Hideki and get hotel Nevermore as his hideout. Colonel Carrera takes over the investigation of Axley's murder and blames it on Kovacs. Kovacs is suspicious of his missing memories and realizes that Quell was there when Axley was murdered.
12	2	"Payment Deferred"	Ciaran Donnelly	Sarah Nicole Jones	February 27, 2020
Colonel Carrera leads the Axley murder investigation and reveals that his unit is composed entirely of upgraded sleeves like the one that Kovacs is using. Carrera pressures Danica to continue her conflict with the miners, while Danica tries to figure out a way to make Carrera leave the planet, thus reducing the control of the Protectorate. Kovacs looks for Axley's bounty hunter, Trepp, and from the information that he gathers from her, finds two of Axley's cohorts, Anton and Haruki, in a club. Quell arrives and kills all the people in the club including Anton and Haruki, but she escapes before Carrera arrives and captures Kovacs. Poe experiences worsening memory issues and resists the urging from Kovacs that he must reboot.
13	3	"Nightmare Alley"	M. J. Bassett	Michael R. Perry	February 27, 2020
Kovacs is questioned by Carrera and Danica about the supposed weapon that can destroy all DHF backups, causing permanent death. Danica sentences Kovacs to die in the Circle, a televised gladiatorial event. Carrera extracts the memories of those that Kovacs loved and realizes who Kovacs is. Carrera reveals that he is Jaeger, Kovacs's former leader, and then drugs him before the Circle begins. Kovacs enters the arena and is forced to fight mercenaries that appear to be his friends Ortega, Rei, and Elliot. Poe attempts to rescue Kovacs, and teams up with an archaeological AI, Dig 301, to disrupt the power supply to the arena. The fourth mercenary to enter the Circle was supposed to appear as Quell, but she was replaced by the actual Quell to help Kovacs escape. A Quell sympathizer cuts power to the Circle, and the two escape. Trepp's bounty to find her brother is unsuccessful and she ends up in prison for beating a miner. Trepp and Myka lose all their savings to get Trepp out of prison. Trepp decides to find Kovacs because of his increasingly high bounty. Jaeger activates project Evergreen.
14	4	"Shadow of a Doubt"	M. J. Bassett	Sang Kyu Kim	February 27, 2020
Quell tries to piece together her memories. Trepp finds Kovacs's location, which upsets Kovacs and he hires Dig 301 while firing Poe. Carrera threatens Tanaseda Hideki for helping Kovacs. Kovacs makes a deal with Trepp to find her brother, Anil Imani. Dugan decides not to leave Harlan and keep an eye on Danica. Kovacs approaches Tanaseda and he agrees to get Kovacs and Quell off the planet. Tanaseda intrudes into Danica's Harlan party and gets permission for two people to transfer out of the planet. Meanwhile, Carrera tortures techs from sector B political prison which makes Danica nervous. Danica straps the techs in Harlan's celebration rocket fireworks. Angelfire is revealed as the laser defense system in the orbit which shoots down the firework rockets. Quell murders Tanaseda and his DHF backups same as Axley. Dugan sees the symbol that Kovacs was trying to find the answer for and tries to escape Harlan but is also murdered by Quell. Kovacs realizes that Quell is killing the founders: Dugan, Tanaseda, Axley, Anton, Haruki, and Konrad Harlan. Quell destroys the main transfer point and disables interstellar travel for everyone on the planet. Jaeger's project evergreen is to double sleeve Takashi Kovacs using an old copy of his stack.
15	5	"I Wake Up Screaming"	Jeremy Webb	Cortney Norris	February 27, 2020
Kovacs and Trepp return to the hotel to find Quell there. Quell has no idea what got into her and why she is killing the founders. Poe decides to question Konrad Harlan and head into VR. Jaeger's resurrected Kovacs is motivated by Jaeger by pinning his sister Rei's death on Kovacs. Kovacs Prime investigates Tanaseda's residence to find the location of Kovacs. Tanaseda's great-grandson leads Kovacs Prime to Nevermore Hotel but Kovacs, Quell, and Trepp escape. Kovacs Prime overrides Dig 301 using the root password and extracts information out of her. Kovacs guides Quell and Trepp to Stronghold in hopes of recovering Quell's memories and running into Kemp. Danica leaks Quell's videos to instill panic and enact provision 532 to gain absolute control over Harlan. Poe finds that Harlan is not in VR and is hidden somewhere else. He escapes from VR by spreading the nanomites affliction he is affected with. Quell incapacitates Trepp with a neck-hold and flees. Kovacs fights Kovacs Prime but is thrown off a cliff edge.
16	6	"Bury Me Dead"	Jeremy Webb	Adam Lash & Cori Uchida	February 27, 2020
Quell reaches the lake next to Stronghold and regains all her memories. Kovacs Prime approaches her as the real Kovacs to find out about the weapon. Quell takes Kovacs Prime to the place where Rei had kept her buried for centuries. Even with Jaeger constantly trying to convince Kovacs Prime, Kovacs Prime starts to understand the reason for Kovacs's actions. Trepp rescues Kovacs and they take out 2 members of Carrera's team. The remaining members are taken out by Kemp and his followers. Quell passes the Envoy test and regains the trust of Kemp and his followers. However, Trepp realizes that Kemp is deceiving them and informs Quell. Kovacs talks to Kovacs Prime and he understands the truth about Jaeger and how he had betrayed them. Kovacs Prime switches sides. Danica takes over the control of Carrera's operation and Kemp reveals that he works for Danica. Danica arrests Carrera for double-sleeve violation. Protectorate soldiers are slaughtered by Angelfire while they close in on Kovacs, Quell, Trepp, and Kovacs Prime.
17	7	"Experiment Perilous"	Salli Richardson-Whitfield	Nevin Densham	February 27, 2020
Quell's sleeve starts to break down. Kovacs Prime is left behind and is retrieved by Danica's soldiers. Danica is now more focused to capture Quell since Quell seemed to have control over Angelfire. Trepp finds out that her brother Anil found Quell and was infected by the same invader that is hacking Quell's stack. Danica makes a deal with Jaeger and he recruits Kovacs Prime in distrust to help him. Poe and Ms Dig build a construct and send Quell and Kovacs to VR, unaware that Jaeger and Kovacs Prime also sneak into the construct. Trepp borrows Kovacs's body to save TJ and Myka. Jaeger can lure Kovacs Prime back on his side and sends him out of the construct, leaving Jaeger stuck inside. Kovacs learns that an elder was borrowing Quell's body which is why Quell was able to control Angelfire. The elder wanted revenge on the Founders for the massacre of the elder's children they committed. Quell escapes out of the construct, while Jaeger and the elder are stuck in it. Ms Dig finds out that she is being tracked and shuts herself down. Jaeger is consumed by the elder who plans to destroy everything since Quell broke her promise.
18	8	"Broken Angels"	Salli Richardson-Whitfield	Alison Schapker & Elizabeth Padden	February 27, 2020
Jaeger, consumed by the elder, starts to get materials to control the Orbitals and begins to reorient the nodes for Angelfire. Kovacs believes that the only way to subdue the elder and save Harlan is to hand over Konrad Harlan to the elder so that the elder can complete its mission. However, they find out that Danica had already killed Konrad Harlan and destroyed his stack along with all the backups. Poe tries to find the convergence point for Angelfire but keeps glitching. Poe realizes that he will have to reboot else he will not be able to function anymore. However, the reboot is akin to death since he will forget everything. Kovacs plans to offer the broken stack of Konrad Harlan to appease the elder. Quell reveals her backup plan: killing Jaeger and taking the elder, thus enabling her to redirect Angelfire on herself to destroy the elder along with her. When Quell, Kovacs, and Danica approach the elder, Danica double-crosses them and tries to kill the elder to obtain control over Angelfire, but she is killed by the elder instead. Poe's reboot starts in between the skirmish, disabling him to assist. Quell, Kovacs, and Kovacs Prime fight the elder, until Kovacs swaps places while Kovacs Prime holds Quell down. Kovacs kills Jaeger, and after allowing the elder to infect him, redirects Angelfire upon himself. Elder and Kovacs experience real death. In the aftermath, Quell and Kovacs Prime survive and continue on their paths. Dig, having renamed herself Annabel, takes over the Nevermore. After three months she is reunited with an amnesiac Poe and it is revealed his final act before rebooting was to back up a DHF, implied to be Kovacs.

=== Anime film (2020) ===
Title	Directed by	Written by	Original release date
Resleeved	Takeru Nakajima & Yoshiyuki Okuda	Dai Sato & Tsukasa Kondo	March 19, 2020
Taking place 253 years before the main events of season one, on the planet Latimer, Takeshi Kovacs must protect a tattooist while investigating the death of a Yakuza boss alongside a no-nonsense CTAC with a secret all her own.

== Themes ==
Human-machine interface, gender identity, technology and society, cyberspace and objective reality, hyper-urbanization that passes up urban planning, artificial intelligence, paranoia.

A key concept in Netflix's cyberpunk series Altered Carbon is the 'stack', an advanced hard drive installed on the brainstem on which a person can save a copy of their consciousness. The main effect of stack technology is a form of immortality, because a stack can be installed into another body if the original body dies. But there's another major implication only hinted at during the first season of Altered Carbon: If you could choose your own body, would you go with the one you were born with? That's an especially important question for gender fluid or transgender people. The topic was only hinted at in the first season, but Altered Carbon creator Laeta Kalogridis told The Wrap it's something she would like to explore in greater detail.

== Reception ==
=== Critical response ===
==== Season 1 ====
On review aggregation website Rotten Tomatoes, the first season holds an approval rating of 70% based on 97 reviews, and an average rating of 6.6/10. The website's critical consensus reads, "Altered Carbon leans hard into its cyberpunk roots, serving up an ambitiously pulpy viewing experience that often overwhelms, but never bores." On Metacritic, the season has a weighted average score of 64 out of 100, based on 25 critics, indicating "generally favorable reviews".

David Griffin of IGN said the show "gets almost everything right" as a "cyberpunk fantasyland". Griffin praised the visuals and the complexity of the plot, as well as the acting, such as Chris Conner's performance as the AI hotel manager Poe. He also wrote of the show's problems, such as the intricacies of the murder often got "in the way of the show's momentum" and the murder plot "loses steam" early on. He ultimately gave it a score of 8.8 out of 10, summarizing it as "A visual titan with a less than stellar story." Michael Rougeau of GameSpot made a point of calling it "hardcore" science fiction, as a "noir sci-fi/gumshoe thriller bursting with the trappings of both genres, from murdered prostitutes and holographic billboard ads to AIs who flit between the real world and some convoluted cyberspace." The review praised how deeply the show examined and explored the cortical stack, the central concept. Catherine Pearson of Digital Spy said the visuals were magnificent and the themes fascinating, but that it had flaws; for example, the characters "mumbling their way through long expository dialogue."

The Vancouver Sun summarized that the reaction of professional critics was mixed, and that the critics' conclusion was that the "murder mystery takes a back seat to the show's futuristic visuals." Entertainment Weekly also summarized reviews, saying the consensus was that the visuals were spectacular, but the violence against women raised questions. Darren Franich of Entertainment Weekly gave it a "B−" grade and wrote that the "show tackles race, gender, and class with all the subtlety of a blowtorch." Forbes criticized other critics for speaking negatively of the show and called it "terrific" and one of the best science fiction shows on television. Andrew Liptak of The Verge called it engrossing, but criticized the lack of focus on the relationships between the characters.

Robert Lloyd of the Los Angeles Times gave it a mixed review, but particularly praised Kinnaman, even if the fight scenes were described as tedious in a way. Jen Chaney of Vulture said the show was "ambitious, convoluted, violent, derivative, and somehow simultaneously grimy and glossy," but ultimately gave it a negative review, saying "the visual candy and philosophical subtext of Altered Carbon may wash over me, but none of it gets absorbed in any lasting way." Radio Times wrote that the "drama tries to find its groove by shifting erratically from noir detective drama to war epic to soap opera, ultimately failing to meet its own lofty ambitions: it's a thunderous haymaker that only manages to graze its target." The review noted that the show takes on too much, and that much of the story could have been left for a second season. Benjamin Lee at The Guardian gave the series 3/5, praising the "sheer ambitious scale of it all" and "it's an impressive step up from what we're usually offered." Lee compared it to the work of Paul Verhoeven only lacking the social commentary. He concludes "it's refreshing to see a show so unashamed about its pulpiness. The spectacle might grow stale but for now, the flash is blinding."

Many critics focused on the show's violence. Gavia Baker-Whitelaw of The Daily Dot wrote that the show seemed to use "the dystopian setting as an excuse for sexualized violence," and that the focus on dead, naked women's bodies "was a massive distraction from the show's stronger points, like the well-choreographed fight scenes and Takeshi Kovacs' backstory." Digital Spy defended the level of violence, arguing it accurately reflected the books, and was "the point" of the franchise, as "without showing brutal, unremitting violence, Altered Carbon would fail to fully explore the dystopian reality it aims to present." Kimberly Roots of TVLine also criticized the scenes of violence and nudity, and also said the story suffered from uneven pacing. However, she noted that the investigation part "clicks along smartly," and that the fight sequences were "sophisticated". She gave it a "B−" grade.

==== Season 2 ====
On Rotten Tomatoes, the second season holds an approval rating of 81% based on 36 reviews, and an average rating of 7/10. The website's critical consensus reads, "While not quite there yet, a clearer sense of purpose and more defined characters help Altered Carbon sophomore season step closer to the brilliance of its source material." On Metacritic, the season has a weighted average score of 65 out of 100, based on 8 critics, indicating "generally favorable reviews".

=== Accolades ===
Year	Award	Category	Recipient	Result	Ref.
2018	44th Saturn Awards	Best New Media Television Series	Altered Carbon	Nominated	
2018	70th Primetime Creative Arts Emmy Awards	Outstanding Main Title Design	Lisa Bolan, Thomas McMahan, Yongsub Song, Byron Slaybaugh, Carlo Sa, Mert Kizilay	Nominated	
2018	70th Primetime Creative Arts Emmy Awards	Outstanding Special Visual Effects	Everett Burrell, Tony Meagher, Joel Whist, Jorge Del Valle, Steve Moncur, Christine Lemon, Paul Jones, Antoine Moulineau, David Zaretti for "Out of the Past"	Nominated	
2019	17th Visual Effects Society Awards	Outstanding Visual Effects in a Photoreal Episode	Everett Burrell, Tony Meagher, Steve Moncur, Christine Lemon, Joel Whist for "Out of the Past"	Nominated	
2019	17th Visual Effects Society Awards	Outstanding Effects Simulations in an Episode, Commercial, or Real-Time Project	Philipp Kratzer, Daniel Fernandez, Xavier Lestourneaud, Andrea Rosa	Won	
2019	17th Visual Effects Society Awards	Outstanding Compositing in a Photoreal Episode	Jean-François Leroux, Reece Sanders, Stephen Bennett, Laraib Atta	Nominated	
