= Listeners =

Japanese anime television series

リスナーズ (Risunāzu)
- Created by: 1st Place; Slow Curve; Story Riders; Original story: Taichi Hashimoto; Dai Satō; Jin
- Anime television series
- Directed by: Hiroaki Andō
- Written by: Dai Satō
- Music by: L!th!um
- Studio: MAPPA
- Licensed by: Funimation
- Original network: MBS, TBS, BS-TBS
- Original run: April 3, 2020 – June 19, 2020
- Episodes: 12

Listeners (Japanese: リスナーズ, Hepburn: Risunāzu) is an original Japanese anime television series produced by MAPPA, created by Jin, and directed by Hiroaki Ando. The series aired from April 3 to June 19, 2020, on the Animeism programming block.

== Plot ==
The series is set in a post-apocalyptic world where Humanity is defended from Earless attacks by the Players, the latter earning fame and fortune along the way. Echo Rec dreams of joining the Players and piloting a mecha of his own, but has no prospects of doing so, until he encounters μ - an enigmatic girl who's lost her memory and has an auxiliary port on her body. An auxiliary port signifies a Player; together, μ and Echo work together towards fame and fortune.

== Characters ==
Echo Rec (エコヲ・レック, Ekowo Rekku)
Voiced by: Ayumu Murase (Japanese); Justin Briner (English)
μ (Mu) (ミュウ, Myū)
Voiced by: Rie Takahashi (Japanese); Bryn Apprill (English)
Nir (ニル, Niru)
Voiced by: Rie Kugimiya (Japanese); Jad Saxton (English)
Roz (ロズ, Rozu)
Voiced by: Kana Hanazawa (Japanese); Brina Palencia (English)
Denka (殿下)
Voiced by: Junichi Suwabe (Japanese); Jamal Sterling (English)
Ritchie (リッチー, Ritchī)
Voiced by: Yūto Uemura (Japanese); Jason Liebrecht (English)
Lyde (ライド, Raido)
Voiced by: Taku Yashiro (Japanese); Ciarán Strange (English)
Janis (ジャニス, Janisu)
Voiced by: Reina Ueda (Japanese); Brittney Karbowski (English)
Robert (ロバート, Robāto)
Voiced by: Banjō Ginga (Japanese); Wilbur Penn (English)
Hole (ホール, Hōru)
Voiced by: Hiro Shimono (Japanese); Brandon McInnis (English)
Kim (キム, Kimu)
Voiced by: Atsuko Tanaka (Japanese); Jessica Calvello (English)
Wendy (ウェンディ, Wendi)
Voiced by: Yōko Honna (Japanese); Rachel Robinson (English)
Lisa (リサ, Risa)
Voiced by: Yukana (Japanese); Stephanie Young (English)
Leo Marshall (レオ・マーシャル, Reo Māsharu)
Voiced by: Shigeru Chiba (Japanese); Charlie Campbell (English)
Ein Neubauten (アイン・ノイバウテン, Ain Noibauten)
Voiced by: Sayaka Ohara (Japanese); Mikaela Krantz (English)
Stür Neubauten (シュテュル・ノイバウテン, Shutyuru Noibauten)
Voiced by: Yōko Hikasa (Japanese); Anastasia Muñoz (English)
Zende Neubauten (ツェンデ・ノイバウテン, Tsende Noibauten)
Voiced by: Tomoyo Kurosawa (Japanese); Sarah Wiedenheft (English)
Swell Rec (スエル・レック, Sueru Rekku)
Voiced by: Rina Satō (Japanese); Morgan Garrett (English)
McGee (マッギィ, Maggyi)
Voiced by: Chō (Japanese); Mark Stoddard (English)
Sally Simpson (サリー・シンプソン, Sarī Shinpuson)
Voiced by: Miyuri Shimabukuro (Japanese); Luci Christian (English)
Tommy Walker (トミー・ウォーカー, Tomī Wōkā)
Voiced by: Yūichi Nakamura (Japanese); Robert McCollum (English)
Field Marshal Ace (エース元帥, Ēsu-gensui)
Voiced by: Hōchū Ōtsuka (Japanese); Kent Williams (English)
Bilin Valentine (ビリン・ヴァレンタイン, Birin Varentain)
Voiced by: Nana Mizuki (Japanese); Caitlin Glass (English)
Kevin Valentine (ケヴィン・ヴァレンタイン, Kevin Varentain)
Voiced by: Kōichi Yamadera (Japanese); Ian Sinclair (English)
Jimi Stonefree (ジミ・ストーンフリー, Jimi Sutōnfurī)
Voiced by: Jun Fukuyama (Japanese); Lee George (English)

== Production and release ==
On June 8, 2019, the original anime television series was announced by Jin, the creator of the Kagerou Project. The series is animated by MAPPA and directed by Hiroaki Ando, with Dai Satō as scriptwriter, Shinpei Kamada as character designer, and L!th!um as music composer. It premiered from April 3 to June 19, 2020, on the Animeism programming block on MBS, TBS, and BS-TBS. ACCAMER performs the series' opening theme "Into the blue's", and Rie Takahashi performs 11 of the series' ending theme songs.

Funimation has acquired the series for an English release, and streams the series on Funimation, AnimeLab and Wakanim.

No.	Title	Original release date
1	"Live Forever"; Transliteration: "Rivu Fōevuā" (Japanese: リヴ・フォーエヴァー (Live Forever))	April 3, 2020
2	"Half Man"; Transliteration: "Hanbun Ningen" (Japanese: 半分人間 (HALBER MENSCH))	April 10, 2020
3	"You Made Me Realise"; Transliteration: "Yū Meido Mī Riaraizu" (Japanese: ユー・メイド・ミー・リアライズ (You Made Me Realise))	April 17, 2020
4	"Teen Spirit"; Transliteration: "Tīn Supiritto" (Japanese: ティーン・スピリット (TEEN SPIRIT))	April 24, 2020
5	"In the Embrace of the Beat"; Transliteration: "Bīto ni Idakarete" (Japanese: ビートに抱かれて (When Doves Cry))	May 1, 2020
6	"Goodbye Blue Sky"; Transliteration: "Gubbai Burū Sukai" (Japanese: グッバイ・ブルー・スカイ (Goodbye Blue Sky))	May 8, 2020
7	"Day of Rage"; Transliteration: "Ikari no Hi" (Japanese: 怒りの日 (problems))	May 15, 2020
8	"Real Me"; Transliteration: "Riaru Mī" (Japanese: リアル・ミー (The Real Me))	May 22, 2020
9	"Freedom"; Transliteration: "Furīdamu" (Japanese: フリーダム (Freedom))	May 29, 2020
10	"Cross Road Blues"; Transliteration: "Kurosurōdo Burūsu" (Japanese: クロスロード・ブルース (Cross Road Blues))	June 5, 2020
11	"I Am The Resurrection"; Transliteration: "Ai Amu Za Rizarekushon" (Japanese: アイ・アム・ザ・リザレクション (I Am The Resurrection))	June 12, 2020
12	"Hello, Goodbye"; Transliteration: "Harō Guddobai" (Japanese: ハロー・グッドバイ (Hello, Goodbye))	June 19, 2020
12	"Tomorrow Never Knows"; Transliteration: "Toumorō Nebā Nouzu" (Japanese: トゥモロー・ネバー・ノウズ (Tomorrow Never Knows))	June 19, 2020

=== Opening/Ending themes ===
Opening Themes
#	Transcription/Translation	Performed by	Episodes
1	"Into the blue's"	ACCAMER	1-12

Ending themes
#	Transcription/Translation	Performed by	Episodes
2	"Muse"	Mu (Rie Takahashi)	2
3	"Borders"	Mu (Rie Takahashi)	3
4	"Slip out!"	Mu (Rie Takahashi)	4
5	"Rainy lain"	Mu (Rie Takahashi)	5
6	"Top of ocean"	Mu (Rie Takahashi)	6
7	"Trauma"	Mu (Rie Takahashi)	7
8	"Dilemma"	Mu (Rie Takahashi)	8
9	"Fairy tale"	Mu (Rie Takahashi)	9
10	"Slumber"	Mu (Rie Takahashi)	10
11	"Love song"	Mu (Rie Takahashi)	11
12	"Listeners"	Mu (Rie Takahashi)	12
12	"Into the blue's"	Rie Takahashi	12 (Epilogue)

== Notes ==
=== References to real life media ===
- Echorec is named after the Binson Echorec, an echo machine used by several bands, most notably Pink Floyd.
- Mu is named after the symbol used to measure the voltage gain of vacuum tubes in guitar amplifiers, like the tube worn around Mu's neck.
- AC30, Echo and Mu's Equipment, is a Vox AC30 guitar amplifier. Mu's special attack, Top Boost, is a reference to the AC30's signature top boost feature: an additional high gain ("brilliant") channel accessed by plugging the instrument cable into a secondary input jack.
- Jimi Stonefree is named after Jimi Hendrix and his 1966 song "Stone Free".
- McGee is named after Alan McGee, music industry executive who first spotted the band Oasis.
- Liverchester is a portmanteau of Liverpool and Manchester, two centers of British rock.
- Leo Marshall is named after Leo Fender and Jim Marshall, pioneers of musical instruments and electric amplifiers.
- The Noise sisters (Ein, Stür & Zende Neubauten) are named after the band Einstürzende Neubauten.
- Birin and Kevin Valentine are named after the band and bandmembers of My Bloody Valentine, Bilinda Butcher and Kevin Shields.
- Nir is named after the band Nirvana, her appearance resembles Kurt Cobain, and her shirt reads "Polly", a song by Nirvana.
- Likewise, Hole is named after the band Hole, and his appearance resembles Courtney Love.
- Denka resembles the singer Prince. The Japanese name Denka (殿下) means highness, further linking the relation.
- Wendy and Lisa are named after Wendy Melvoin and Lisa Coleman, who worked with Prince in his band The Revolution.
- Lyde and Ritchie are named for Johnny Rotten (né John Lydon) and Sid Vicious (John Ritchie), from the band Sex Pistols, respectively.
- Tommy Walker and Sally Simpson are named after 'characters' in The Who's 1969 rock-opera album Tommy.
- Janis is named after Janis Joplin.
- The title of episode 1 is named after the 1994 song "Live Forever" by English rock band Oasis.
- The title of episode 2 is named after the 1985 album Halber Mensch by German rock band Einstürzende Neubauten.
- The title of episode 3 is named after the 1988 EP You Made Me Realise by Irish alt-rock band My Bloody Valentine. The title card for the episode resembles the album cover of 1991 album Loveless.
- The title of episode 4 is named after the 1991 song "Smells Like Teen Spirit" by American grunge-rock band Nirvana. The episode features a drug called "Teen Spirit".
- The native title of episode 5 is named after the 1984 song "When Doves Cry" by American singer Prince. The setting of the episode is based on Minneapolis, Prince's hometown.
- The title of episode 6 is named after the 1979 song "Goodbye Blue Sky" by English rock band Pink Floyd. The episode prominently features a city within a triangular prism (resembling the album cover of The Dark Side of the Moon) called "the Wall".
- The native title of episode 7 is named after the 1977 song "Problems" by English punk rock band the Sex Pistols. The title card for the episode also resembles the album cover of Never Mind the Bollocks, Here's the Sex Pistols.
- The title of episode 8 is named after the 1974 song "The Real Me" by English rock band The Who. The symbol of the Council Unit resembles the bullseye logo for the band.
- The title of episode 9 is named after the 1971 song "Freedom" by American rock guitarist Jimi Hendrix. Like "Teen Spirit", there is another drug featured in the episode called "Purple Haze".
- The title of episode 10 is named after the 1937 song "Cross Road Blues" by American blues artist Robert Johnson. The episode preview also alludes to making a deal with the devil, a popular myth surrounding Johnson's success. The village this episode is set in is named after Clarksdale, Mississippi, where Johnson and several famous blues musicians used to live.
- The title of episode 11 is named after the 1992 song "I Am the Resurrection" by English rock band The Stone Roses.
- The title of episode 12 is named after the 1967 song "Hello, Goodbye" by English rock band The Beatles. The title card of the episode resembles the album cover of Magical Mystery Tour. The epilogue title is named after the 1966 song "Tomorrow Never Knows", also by The Beatles.
