= Richard K. Morgan =

British science fiction and fantasy author

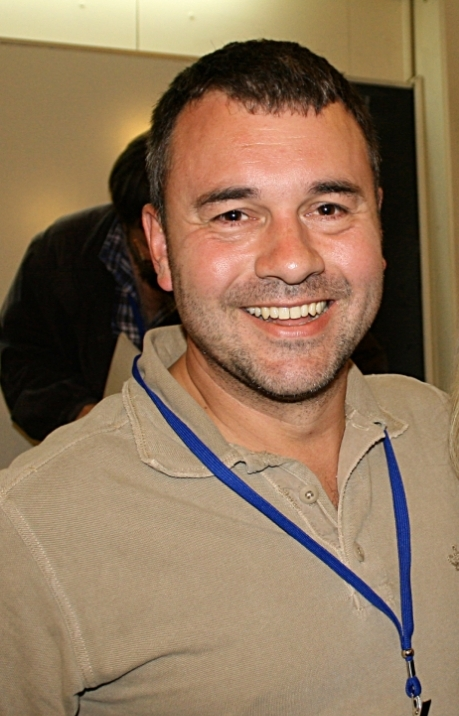
- Morgan in Zagreb at SFeraKon, 2008
- Born: Richard Kingsley Morgan; 24 September 1965 (age 61); Norwich, England
- Occupation: Writer
- Writing career
- Genres: Hardboiled, cyberpunk, science fiction, fantasy
- Website: www.richardkmorgan.com

Richard Kingsley Morgan (born 24 September 1965 in Norwich) is a British science fiction and fantasy author of books, short stories, and graphic novels. He is the winner of the Philip K. Dick Award for his 2003 book Altered Carbon, which was adapted into a Netflix series released in 2018. His third book, Market Forces, won the John W. Campbell Award in 2005, while his 2008 work Thirteen garnered him the Arthur C. Clarke Award.

== Early life and education ==
Morgan was born in Norwich, and brought up in the village of Hethersett, near Norwich, and had a semi-rural upbringing. He attended a private school and later studied modern languages and history at Queens' College, Cambridge. After graduating he started teaching English to travel the world. After 14 years and a post at the University of Strathclyde, his first novel was published and he became a full-time writer. He lived in Glasgow until 2015, when he moved to Saxlingham Nethergate with his wife Virginia and their son Daniel.

== Literary career ==
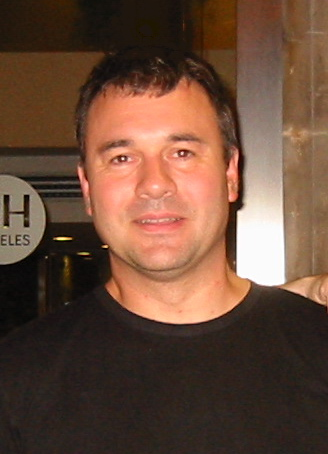
Richard K. Morgan in 2007

In 2002 Morgan's first novel Altered Carbon was published, combining elements of cyberpunk and hardboiled detective fiction and featuring the antihero Takeshi Kovacs. In 2003 the U.S. edition of Altered Carbon received the Philip K. Dick Award and the film rights were sold for a reported figure of $1,000,000 to film producer Joel Silver, enabling Morgan to become a full-time writer. The film rights were later acquired by Laeta Kalogridis, but production was trapped in development hell for a decade, eventually gaining release in 2018 as a Netflix series.

In 2003, Broken Angels was published, the sequel to Altered Carbon, again featuring Takeshi Kovacs and blending science fiction and war fiction in a similar way to his cross-genre début. The success of this book solidified his literary reputation.

Market Forces, Morgan's first non-Kovacs novel, is set in the near future. It was originally written as a short story, then as a screenplay (both unpublished). After the success of his first two works, it was released as a novel and optioned as a film.

Morgan's third Kovacs novel, intended as the final novel in the series, Woken Furies, was released in the UK in March 2005 and in the U.S. in September 2005. In this novel, the Takeshi Kovacs character comes into his own as a hero, not merely a long-black-coat clad, boilerplate antihero.

Morgan wrote two six-issue miniseries for Marvel Comics under the Marvel Knights imprint. His first story, Black Widow: Homecoming published monthly in 2004 was followed by a second, Black Widow: The Things They Say About Her published monthly in 2005; both are available in collected editions. The second miniseries ended on a cliffhanger, but a third miniseries was never released, with Morgan stating that the series was "an artefact of limited appeal". Morgan's work on the character introduced a new backstory for the character involving the Red Room. He received a "Special Thanks" credit in the 2021 Black Widow film.

Black Man was released in May 2007 in the UK and in June 2007 in the United States (as Thirteen or Th1rte3n). Later UK editions were published with the Thirteen title. According to the author, the book is about the constraints of physicality and the idea that people are locked into who they are. These are things he could not deal with in the Kovacs universe, because for Kovacs and people like him mortality is avoidable: they just skip into a new body. The novel won the 2008 Arthur C. Clarke Award.

Morgan wrote a fantasy trilogy with a gay protagonist, A Land Fit for Heroes, the first volume of which has the title The Steel Remains and was published in August 2008 in the UK and on 20 January 2009 in the United States. The second volume, titled The Cold Commands was published in 2011. The third book in the series is called The Dark Defiles and was published on 17 August 2014.

In 2008 Morgan worked with Starbreeze as a writer for Syndicate, the 2012 re-imagining of the 1992 video game. Additionally, Morgan worked with Electronic Arts and Crytek as lead writer for their 2011 video game, Crysis 2.

In 2015/16 Liber Primus Games released a visual novel based on the A Land Fit For Heroes trilogy.

In October 2018 Morgan's science fiction novel, Thin Air, was published in the UK by Gollancz. In an interview before the launch of Thin Air, Morgan described a common feature of his works:

There is a central conceit that I keep — not consciously, I swear! — returning to in my work. It takes different metaphorical guises, but at root it's always the same sense of something grand and worthwhile being abandoned by vicious and stupid men in favour of short-term profit and tribal hegemony. You see it in the regressive politics of the Protectorate in the Kovacs novels, the way both the Yhelteth Empire and the — so-called — Free Cities fail their duty as civilisations in A Land Fit for Heroes. So also with Thin Air — the landscape is littered with the markers of a retreat from the grand scheme of terraforming and building a home for humanity on Mars, in favour of an ultraprofitable corporate stasis and an ongoing lie of highly emotive intangibles sold to the general populace in lieu of actual progress.

A graphic novel titled Altered Carbon: Download Blues, which continues to follow the character Takeshi Kovacs, was released in July 2019, and an animated feature entitled Altered Carbon: Resleeved was released in 2020 on Netflix.

In 2026, Morgan published No Man's Land, a fantasy novel set in the aftermath of World War I.

Morgan's books are generally set in a post-extropianist dystopian world. Morgan described his "takeaway" of one of his books as:

Society is, always has been and always will be a structure for the exploitation and oppression of the majority through systems of political force dictated by an élite, enforced by thugs, uniformed or not, and upheld by a wilful ignorance and stupidity on the part of the majority whom the system oppresses.

== Bibliography ==
=== Takeshi Kovacs novels ===
- Altered Carbon (2002) ISBN 0-575-07390-X
- Broken Angels (2003) ISBN 0-575-07550-3
- Woken Furies (2005) ISBN 0-575-07325-X

=== A Land Fit For Heroes ===
- The Steel Remains (2008) ISBN 0-575-07792-1
- The Cold Commands (2011) ISBN 0-575-07793-X
- The Dark Defiles (2014) ISBN 0575088605

=== Black Man novels ===
- Black Man (2007) ISBN 0-575-07513-9 (known as Thirteen or Th1rte3n in the United States and in later UK editions ISBN 0-345-48525-4)
- Thin Air (2018) ISBN 978-0575075146

=== Other novels ===
- Market Forces (2004) ISBN 0-575-07584-8
- No Man's Land (2026) ISBN 978-0345493156

=== Graphic novels ===
- Black Widow: Homecoming (2005) ISBN 0-7851-1493-9
- Black Widow: The Things They Say About Her (2006) ISBN 0-7851-1768-7
- Crysis (2012) ISBN 978-16-1377-119-8
- Altered Carbon: Download Blues (2019) ISBN 978-1524109677
- Altered Carbon: One Life, One Death (2022) ISBN 978-1524119874

=== Video games ===
- Crysis 2 (2011)
- Syndicate (2012)
- A Land Fit For Heroes (2015)

=== Music ===
- "Woken Furies" from the album Dark All Day by Gunship (2018)

Awards
Preceded by Carol Emshwiller for The Mount	Philip K. Dick Award; 2003 for Altered Carbon	Succeeded by Gwyneth Jones for Life
Preceded by Jack McDevitt for Omega	John W. Campbell Memorial Award for Best Science Fiction Novel; 2005 for Market Forces	Succeeded by Robert J. Sawyer for Mindscan
Preceded by M. John Harrison for Nova Swing	Arthur C. Clarke Award; 2008 for Black Man	Succeeded by Ian R. MacLeod for Song of Time
