= Altered Carbon =

2002 novel by Richard K. Morgan

- Author: Richard K. Morgan
- Language: English
- Series: Takeshi Kovacs
- Genre: Science fiction, mystery
- Publisher: Victor Gollancz Ltd
- Publication date: 28 February 2002
- Publication place: United Kingdom
- Media type: Print (hardback & paperback)
- Pages: 416 pp (hardback), 375 (paperback)
- ISBN: 0-575-07321-7
- OCLC: 48236269
- Followed by: Broken Angels

Altered Carbon is a 2002 British cyberpunk novel by the English writer Richard K. Morgan. Set in a future in which interstellar travel and relative immortality is facilitated by transferring consciousnesses between bodies ("sleeves"), it follows the attempt of Takeshi Kovacs, a former U.N. elite soldier turned private investigator, to investigate a rich man's death. It is followed by the sequels Broken Angels and Woken Furies.

The book was adapted as a Netflix television series, also titled Altered Carbon, in 2018. In 2019 a graphic novel was created with Dynamite Comics.

== Premise ==
In the future, humans have achieved virtual immortality. Most people have cortical stacks in their spinal columns that store their consciousness. If their body dies, their stack can be stored indefinitely. Their stacks can be downloaded into new bodies, or "sleeves", after death. The exception to this rule is if the person is killed by an energy weapon, as their stack is destroyed permanently. Roman Catholics do not allow their stacks to be re-sleeved after death, as they believe that the soul goes to Heaven when they die, and so would not pass on to the new sleeve. This makes Catholics easy targets for murder, since killers know their victim may not be re-sleeved to testify. At the start of the novel, UN Resolution 653 is being debated. This proposition reverses precedent and would allow authorities to temporarily re-sleeve a deceased Catholic woman to testify in a murder trial. Dual-sleeving, or controlling two bodies with one personality, is strictly prohibited by U.N. law.

While most people can afford to get resleeved at the end of their lives, they are unable to update their bodies and must go through the full aging process each time, which discourages most from re-sleeving more than once or twice. Thus, while people can live indefinitely in theory, most choose not to. Only the wealthy are able to acquire replacement bodies on a continual basis. Those who have lived for multiple lifespans are called Meths, a reference to the Biblical figure Methuselah. The very rich are also able to keep copies of their minds in remote storage, which they update regularly. This ensures that even if their stack is destroyed, they can be re-sleeved. People who commit serious crimes are imprisoned "on stack". Their consciousness is preserved and stored virtually, sometimes for decades, while their body is sold to the highest bidder to be used for re-sleeving another person.

Numerous colony planets exist apart from Earth; many were previously inhabited by an extinct alien civilization referred to as the Elders. In order to deal with the challenges of interspace warfare, the U.N. created the Envoys. They are an elite military group with extensive training in re-sleeving and psychological modification, as well as combat. Envoys are so successful and dangerous that they are generally prohibited from holding elected office on any world.

== Plot summary ==
On the colony planet of Harlan's World, Takeshi Kovacs, former Envoy who had returned to a life of crime, and his partner Sarah Sachilowski, are killed by a U.N. colonial commando unit. Kovacs is sentenced to a long term in stack storage. On Earth, a Meth named Laurens Bancroft has died in mysterious circumstances in Bay City (formerly San Francisco). The re-sleeved Bancroft has no memories of the previous two days, including his own death. Though police officer Kristin Ortega believes he committed suicide, Bancroft is convinced he was murdered. He uses his influence to have Kovacs temporarily released from storage, then hires him to investigate. Kovacs discovers that Bancroft has been involved with numerous prostitutes, including recent murder victim Elizabeth Elliot. Elizabeth's mother Irene was imprisoned for illegally hacking Bancroft's memories. Elizabeth's father is too poor to re-sleeve Elizabeth or to free his wife from the stacks.

Laurens' wife, Miriam, seduces Kovacs and bribes him to end the investigation. A high-level Russian operative named Kadmin tries to assassinate Kovacs, but fails and is captured. Kovacs investigates the brothel where Elizabeth worked. He learns he is wearing the sleeve of Elias Ryker, a corrupt police officer and Ortega's lover. He is tortured by physicians from the Wei Clinic, who deal in black market sleeve theft. He tells his interrogators that he is an Envoy and they release him. A mysterious woman named Trepp says she will bring Kovacs to Ray, who is behind the clinic's operations. Kovacs escapes, destroys the brothel and clinic, and murders the employees in the process.

Kovacs and Ortega are injured in an explosion orchestrated by Kadmin, who has escaped police custody. Trepp brings Kovacs to "Ray", or Reileen Kawahara. Kawahara is a Meth mob boss with whom Kovacs has dealt in the past. He had rejected her offers of partnership, believing her to be cruel and manipulative. Kawahara orders Kovacs to end his investigation, or she will torture Sarah, who is currently in virtual storage.

Kovacs and Ortega begin sleeping together and form a partnership. Kovacs agrees to convince Bancroft he committed suicide. His version of the story is as follows. Bancroft contracted the Rawlings virus from a brothel. The Rawlings virus is designed to scramble cortical stacks and prevent re-sleeving, causing permanent death. To prevent it from contaminating his clones, Bancroft committed suicide. Kawahara agrees to procure a copy of the virus for Kovacs. With Kawahara's help, he retrieves Irene Elliot from stack, and hires her to implant the Rawlings virus into a brothel.

Kovacs learns that Bancroft went to an airship-turned-brothel named Head in the Clouds on the night he died. This establishment is run by Kawahara. Kadmin kidnaps Ortega and threatens to kill her unless Kovacs trades himself for her. Ortega is released, and Kovacs is forced to fight in a duel against Kadmin. Trepp and the police arrive, killing Kadmin. Kovacs destroys Kadmin's stack.

Kovacs double-sleeves, controlling both Ryker and a second body simultaneously. The copy in Ryker's sleeve leaves with Miriam to draw away surveillance. Ortega and Kovacs infiltrate Head in the Clouds. Irene spikes Kawahara's personality backup with the Rawlings virus, destroying all of her clones. Kovacs forces a confession from Kawahara. After a Catholic prostitute was murdered at Head in the Clouds, her resurrection would have revealed Kawahara's illegal activity. As part of her cover-up, Kawahara framed Ryker for corruption, since he was investigating the murder. She asked Bancroft to help her kill Resolution 653 to prevent the prostitute from testifying, but he refused. Kawahara and Miriam had Bancroft drugged; out of his mind, he killed a prostitute and then killed himself in order to erase the memory out of guilt and self-preservation. With his memories gone, Kawahara's involvement could not be traced.

Assisted by Trepp, Kovacs blows out the side of the airship. As he and Kawahara fall to the ocean below, he uses a grenade to destroy Kawahara's stack, ensuring her permanent death.

In the aftermath, Bancroft is cleared by the U.N. for his involvement with Kawahara. The copy of Kovacs that stayed with Miriam is erased, as double sleeving is illegal, but he makes the surviving copy of Kovacs promise to cover up Miriam's involvement. Irene Elliot gets her body back, Elizabeth and Ryker are freed from the stacks, Resolution 653 passes, and Kovacs is freed and returned to Harlan's World.

== Reception ==
Describing the book, Kirkus Reviews said that "The body count is high, the gadgetry pure genius, the sex scenes deliriously overwrought, and the worn cynicism thoroughly distasteful: a welcome return to cyberpunk's badass roots."

The book won the Philip K. Dick Award for Best Novel in 2003.

== In other media ==
=== Television ===
A television adaptation was announced in 2016. An initial 10-episode season had been ordered by Netflix. The first season premiered on Netflix on 2 February 2018.

Extensive and significant changes to the source material were made in the adaptation.

In the series Envoys are presented as having been trained, deployed and led by Quellcrist Falconer as part of a revolution (called "the Uprising") that she leads on Harlan's World (Kovacs' home planet). Kovacs is shown as having been trained as an Envoy by, and serving as a revolutionary under, Falconer. The Quellist Revolution is crushed by the Protectorate (the established, inter-planetary government) in an apocalyptic assault. Kovacs, the only survivor, is presented as the last Envoy. In the books, Envoys were and are the elite forces of the Protectorate (which would have been fighting against the revolution); Falconer did lead a revolution but died long before Kovacs was born; Kovacs trained as an Envoy under a different woman; and the Envoy Corps is still very much in use by the Protectorate and remains widely feared, although Kovacs is no longer a member of Corps.

The makers of the show have also chosen to expand the roles of many characters, particularly female characters.

In the book, the hotel in which Kovacs stays while investigating Bancroft's murder is themed after Jimi Hendrix. Since the Hendrix estate does not approve of licensing his image for anything they consider violent, the show instead chose the figure of Edgar Allan Poe and named the hotel The Raven.

=== Film ===
On 8 November 2018, Netflix announced an animated companion film, Altered Carbon: Resleeved, set in the same universe and exploring new elements of the story mythology. On 10 February 2020, it was unveiled that the exclusive Netflix "anime featured" spin-off would debut on 19 March 2020. The film was directed by Jo Nakajima at Anima; Yoshiyuki Okada designed the characters, Ren Kikuchi supervised the CG animation, and MONACA composed the music. The Japanese cast includes Tatsuhisa Suzuki as Takeshi Kovacs, Rina Satou as Gina, Ayaka Asai as Holly Togram, Jouji Nakata as Ogai, Kenji Yamauchi as Hideki Tanaseda, Kanehira Yamamoto as Shinji, and Kōji Ishii as Genzo.
