= Woken Furies =

2005 novel by Richard K. Morgan

- First edition
- Author: Richard Morgan
- Language: English
- Series: Takeshi Kovacs
- Genre: Science fiction
- Publisher: Victor Gollancz Ltd
- Publication date: 17 March 2005
- Publication place: United Kingdom
- Media type: Print (hardcover) & (Paperback)
- Pages: 436 (hardback), 575 (paperback)
- ISBN: 0-575-07325-X (hardcover), ISBN 0-575-07652-6 (paperback)
- OCLC: 57354392
- Preceded by: Broken Angels

Woken Furies (2005) is a science fiction novel by British writer Richard Morgan. It is the third novel featuring the anti-hero Takeshi Kovacs and is the sequel to Broken Angels.

This addition to the series casts light upon Kovacs' early life providing information on his post-envoy activities.

Morgan's official website and interviews suggest that Woken Furies could be the last Kovacs novel, although in 2018 (before Netflix cancelled the show) Morgan stated that the Netflix adaptation has "kind of woken it all up again" after all these years, making him possibly reconsider being done with Kovacs.

== Plot ==
Takeshi Kovacs finds himself in a new "sleeve," or human body, back on his home planet of Harlan's World. He is on the run after making numerous attacks against the Knights of the New Revelation, an extremist religious order responsible for the death of his lost love and her daughter. Because she had violated tenets about resleeving, her executioners dropped her and her daughter's cortical stacks in the sea, effectively preventing them from being resleeved (into new bodies).

While trying to secure passage after his most recent attack, Kovacs saves a woman named Sylvie from a group of religious zealots. In return, she allows him to take refuge with her mercenary "deCom" crew as they head out to decommission sentient military hardware that has run amok on the island of New Hokkaido (AKA New Hok). Sylvie is the "command head" of her crew, co-ordinating them during missions by using her biologically implanted circuitry and software.

During one of these missions, Sylvie collapses, regains consciousness, and Kovacs realizes that her personality seems to have been replaced by that of long-dead revolutionary leader Quellcrist Falconer. Harlan's World is surrounded by automated "orbitals" which target flying objects, such as vehicles, with high-energy beam weapons known as "angelfire"; Falconer is believed to have died without a backup of her cortical stack when her getaway aircraft was destroyed by angelfire 300 years prior.

When Sylvie's crew returns from New Hok, they discover a younger version of Kovacs has been illegally duplicated into a different body (AKA "double sleeved") and is hunting them on behalf of the Harlan family that rules the planet. Most of Sylvie's crew is killed and Sylvie/Quellcrist is captured. Kovacs schemes to rescue Sylvie by approaching old criminal associates of his, the Little Blue Bugs.

The Little Blue Bugs mount a semi-successful attack on a Harlan fortress and rescue Sylvie/Quellcrist. Hiding from Harlan forces in a floating base, the neo-Quellists are sold out by its owner and recaptured. An assault by Kovacs and a single UN Envoy on the base ends badly when Kovacs is betrayed by the Envoy who was actually embedded with several colleagues. However, Sylvie/Quellcrist has established a connection with the orbitals and calls down angelfire, eliminating their captors. The younger Kovacs is killed in the aftermath.

Sylvie explains that angelfire is a destructive recording device. Thus, in destroying Quellcrist and the helicopter carrying her, it copied her. When the technology of the deCom crews advanced far enough, her persona was able to insert itself into Sylvie's implants and co-exist in her body.

The novel ends with Kovacs, Virginia Vidaura, and Sylvie/Quellcrist waiting to see if they can use Sylvie/Quellcrist's newfound connection to the orbitals and the expansion of a long-dormant genetic virus to turn the population against the ruling oligarchy.
