= Black Man (novel) =

2007 novel by Richard Morgan

- Author: Richard Morgan
- Language: English
- Genre: Science fiction
- Publisher: Victor Gollancz Ltd
- Publication date: 17 May 2007
- Publication place: Great Britain
- Media type: Print (Hardcover & Paperback)
- Pages: 560 pp (Hardcover); 546 (Paperback)
- ISBN: 0-575-07513-9 (UK Hardcover); ISBN 0-575-07813-8 (UK Paperback); ISBN 0-345-48525-4 (US Hardcover)
- OCLC: 78989112

Black Man (published as Thirteen, stylised as Th1rte3n, in North America and later UK editions) is a 2007 science fiction novel by the British author Richard Morgan. It won the 2008 Arthur C. Clarke Award.

== Premise ==
Carl Marsalis is a selectively bred human ("genetic variant") known as a "Thirteen", characterized by high aggression and low sociability. Bred to serve in a military capacity, Thirteens were later confined on reservations or exiled to Mars. Carl, having won by lottery the right to return from Mars, works covertly, tracking down renegade Thirteens. Throughout the novel it is implied several times that aggression has either been bred out of "normal" humans, or at least has become suppressed to the degree where Marsalis intimidates others simply by approaching and speaking to them, while at the same time Thirteens are stigmatised and treated as second-class citizens. During a regular police investigation he becomes involved with a detective and begins to develop feelings for her, which beyond basic desires are unusual for a Thirteen. Eventually, the detective is murdered by a slow-acting toxin, and Marsalis decides to track down her killer.

== Related works ==
Morgan's 2018 novel Thin Air is set in the same reality, with another genetically-modified protagonist but with all the action taking place on Mars.
