= Dai Satō =

Japanese screenwriter and musician (born 1969)

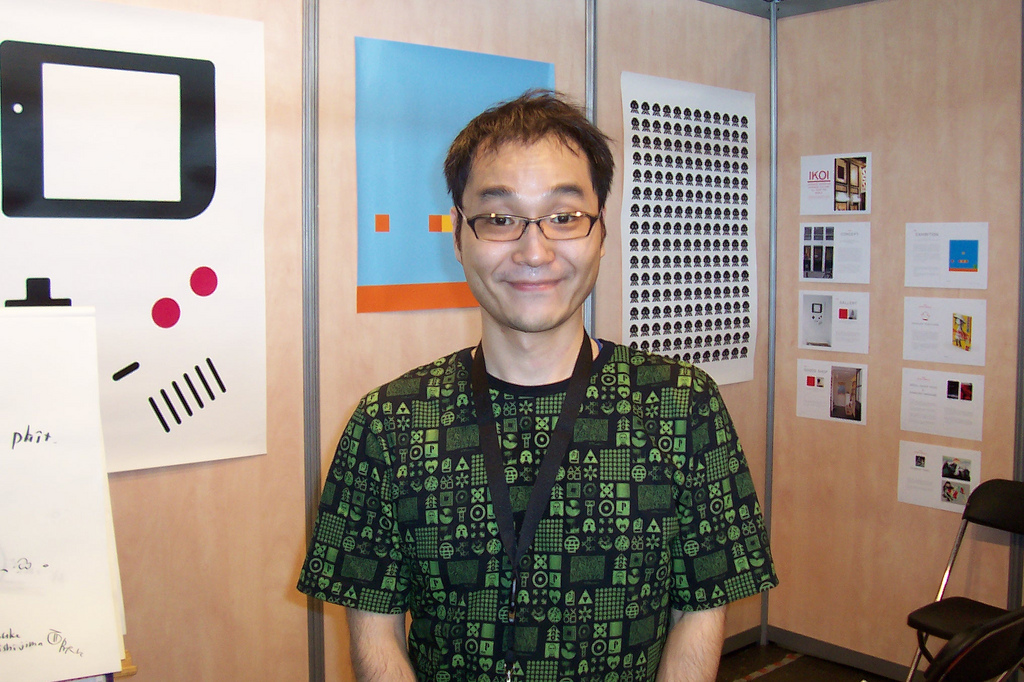
- Dai Satō at Japan Expo 2009
- Born: 1969 (age 56–57); Japan
- Occupations: Screenwriter and Musician
- Known for: Cowboy Bebop; Ergo Proxy; Eureka Seven; Ghost in the Shell: Stand Alone Complex; Wolf's Rain; Pokémon

Dai Satō (佐藤 大, Satō Dai; born in 1969) is a Japanese screenwriter and musician.

Having begun scriptwriting at a young age and writing scripts for various companies, Satō later focused his attention on writing for anime series. The first major series he worked on was the groundbreaking 1998 Sunrise series Cowboy Bebop, after which he worked on other well-known series, such as Ghost in the Shell: Stand Alone Complex and Wolf's Rain. In 2005, Satō was the chief writer of Psalms of Planets Eureka Seven, for which he received an award for best screenplay at the Tokyo International Anime Fair in 2006.

In 2006 and 2007, Satō worked on the Sunrise OVA series Freedom Project (which featured director Katsuhiro Otomo).

Satō also created his own consultant company, Frognation, with two of his acquaintances, which incorporated he and his friend Kengo Watanabe's own electronic music label Frogman Records.

In 2007, after leaving Frognation, Satō established his second company Storyriders.

== Major works ==
=== Anime television series ===
- Cowboy Bebop (1998–1999): script, stage setting cooperation
  - "Jamming with Edward"
  - "Bohemian Rhapsody"
  - "Brain Scratch"
- Ghost in the Shell: Stand Alone Complex (2002–2003): script
  - "C: The Man Who Dwells in the Shadows of the Net – CHAT! CHAT! CHAT!"
  - "SA: A Perfect Day for a Jungle Cruise – JUNGLE CRUISE"
  - "C: Vanished Medication – RE-VIEW"
  - "C: Left-Behind Trace – ERASER"
  - "C: Public Security Section 9, Once Again – STAND ALONE COMPLEX"
- Wolf's Rain (2003): script
  - "The Flower Maiden"
  - "Misgivings"
  - "Vanishing Point"
  - "The Fallen Keep"
  - "Battle's Red Glare"
  - "Heartbeat of the Black City"
  - "Moonlight Crucible"
- Ghost in the Shell: S.A.C. 2nd GIG (2004): script
  - "DI: Saturday Night and Sunday Morning – CASH EYE"
  - "IN: Those Who Have the Motive – INDUCTANCE"
  - "DI: Vegetarian Dinner – FAKE FOOD"
  - "DU: The Hope Named Despair – AMBIVALENCE"
  - "DU: Abandoned City – REVERSAL PROCESS"
- Samurai Champloo (2004): script
  - "Artistic Anarchy"
  - "The Art of Altercation"
  - "Beatbox Bandits"
  - "War of the Words"
  - "Cosmic Collisions"
- Kenran Butohsai (2004): script
  - "Bizarre! The Ghost Ship Drift Zone"
  - "Enter! Hakubutsu Ship, Eichi's Castle!"
  - "Good-bye My Friend! A Man's Dream Lasts Forever"
  - "The Dawn of Mars! Mars Daybreak"
- Eureka Seven (2005–2006): series composition, script
  - "Blue Monday"
  - "Blue Sky Fish"
  - "Motion Blue"
  - "Watermelon"
  - "Paper Moon Shine"
  - "Acperience 1"
  - "Memory Band"
  - "Crackpot"
  - "Helter Skelter"
  - "Pacific State"
  - "Date of Birth"
  - "Shout to the Top!"
  - "Wish Upon a Star"
- Ergo Proxy (2006–2007): chief writer, screenplay
  - "Pulse of Awakening/Awakening"
  - "Confession of a Fellow Citizen/Confession"
  - "Leap into the Void/Mazecity"
  - "Signs of Future, Hades of Future/Futu-Risk"
  - "RE-L124C41+"
  - "Light Beam/Shining Sign"
  - "In the White Darkness/Anamnesis"
  - "Nightmare Quiz Show/Who Wants to Be in Jeopardy!"
  - "The Girl with a Smile/Eternal Smile"
  - "Proxy/Deus ex Machina"
- Toward the Terra (2007): script
  - "The Lonesome Mu"
  - "Red Eyes, Blue Planet"
  - "Eternity and the Heat Haze"
- Battle Spirits: Shounen Toppa Bashin (2008–2009): series composition, script
  - "Front Breaking Bashin Enters Stage!"
  - "The Rival's Name is J"
  - "Arrival of the Gunslinger's Apparition!"
  - "First Final is Smile After Tears"
  - "Batosupi Under the Sakura"
  - "Middle School Uniforms New School Uniforms"
  - "Break Through From the Front Showtime- The Curtain Raised!"
  - "The Last Opponent Nine- The Last Battle"
  - "Take it From the Life! Shine, Cornerstone's Settlement!"
  - "Miracle Card Battler- Bashin Breaks Through From the Front!"
- Eden of the East (2009): screenplay
  - "On the Night of the Late Show"
  - "Search for a Fore-Lost Journey"
- Lupin the Third: The Woman Called Fujiko Mine (2012): script
  - "The Girl and the Samurai"
  - "Magic and Revolution"
  - "Dead City"
- Chō Soku Henkei Gyrozetter (2012–2013): series composition (story riders), script
  - "Raibird to the Front!"
  - "The Secret of the Rosettagraphy"
  - "Appearance! Eraser-01!"
  - "Clash! Raibird vs Guiltice!"
  - "Complete! Raibird Hyper Spec"
  - "The Nightmare of Great Kraken"
  - "Hyper Speed Special Showcasing All of Gyrozetter"
  - "RRR Awakens! Secret of the Burst Core"
  - "The Saki from the future"
  - "Roar! Moebius Overdrive!"
- Space Dandy (2014): script
  - "The Search For the Phantom Space Ramen, Baby"
  - "The War of the Undies and Vests, Baby"
  - "Even Vacuum Cleaners Fall in Love, Baby"
  - "To Be Judged Is Dandy, Baby"
- Dai-Shogun – Great Revolution (2014): series composition
- Mysterious Joker (2014–2015): series composition
  - "Paris and the 100-Year Safe"
  - "The Shadow Descends"
  - "The Labyrinth of Shadows and Mirrors"
  - "Light and Shadow Jokers"
- Puzzle & Dragons X (2016–2018): series composition (story riders), script
  - "Drop Impact"
- Listeners (2020): series composition (story riders), script
- Yurei Deco (2022): series composition, script
  - "The Adventures in Tom Sawyer"
  - "The Mysterious Stranger"
  - "A Sham Trial"
  - "The Yurei Detective Club"
  - "Smiley and the Flying Lost One"
  - "Reach for the Heavens!"
  - "2 Fathoms to Heaven?"
  - "Home of the Greatest Secret"
- Pokémon (2023–present): series composition, script
- Lazarus (2025): script
  - "Don't Stop the Dance"
  - "Death on Two Legs"

=== OVA ===
- Eternal Family (1997): Screenplay
- Ghost in the Shell: Stand Alone Complex – The Laughing Man (2005): Screenplay
- Ghost in the Shell: S.A.C. 2nd GIG – Individual Eleven (2006): Screenplay
- Freedom Project (2006): Series Composition, Scenario
- Halo Legends (2010): Screenplay
  - "The Package"
- Five Numbers! (2011): Screenplay, Original Development

=== ONA ===
- Ghost in the Shell: SAC_2045 (2020): script
  - "IDENTITY THEFT – The Lonely Struggle"
- Super Crooks (2021): Series Composition, Script
  - "Electro Boy"
  - "Kasey"
  - "The Praetorian"
  - "The Heat"
  - "The Union of Justice"
  - "Count Orlok"
  - "The Bastard"
  - "Super Crooks"
- Time Patrol Bon (2024): Script
  - "The Secret of the Pyramid"
  - "An Ancient Man Crosses the Pacific"
  - "The Dark Labyrinth"
  - "Riding a Dinosaur on Vacation"
  - "Gunfight on the O.K. Corral"
  - "The Sacrifice to Chacmool"
  - "The Sumerian Boy"
  - "The Day Troy Fell"

=== Manga ===
- Resident Evil: Heavenly Island

=== Films ===
- Casshern (2004): Screenplay
- Tekken: Blood Vengeance (2011): Screenplay
- Psalm of Planets Eureka Seven: Hi-Evolution 1 (2017): Script
- Altered Carbon: Resleeved (2020): Screenplay
- Words Bubble Up Like Soda Pop (2021): Script
- Doraemon: Nobita's Little Star Wars 2021 (2022): Screenplay
- Break of Dawn (2022): Screenplay

=== Video games ===
- Ace Combat 3: Electrosphere (1999): Screenplay
- Blood: The Last Vampire (2000): Screenplay
- Ghost in the Shell: Stand Alone Complex (2004): Screenplay
- Resident Evil: Revelations (2012): Chief script writer
- E.X. Troopers (2012): Story
- Resident Evil: Revelations 2 (2015): Chief script writer
