= Broken Angels (novel) =

2003 novel by Richard K. Morgan

- First edition
- Author: Richard K. Morgan
- Language: English
- Series: Takeshi Kovacs
- Genre: Military science fiction
- Publisher: Victor Gollancz Ltd
- Publication date: 20 March 2003
- Publication place: United Kingdom
- Media type: Print (hardback & paperback)
- Pages: 400 (hardback), 366 (paperback)
- ISBN: 0-575-07323-3 (hardcover), ISBN 0-345-45771-4 (paperback)
- OCLC: 51271661
- Preceded by: Altered Carbon
- Followed by: Woken Furies

Broken Angels (2003) is a military science fiction novel by British writer Richard Morgan. It is the sequel to Altered Carbon, and is followed by Woken Furies.

== Plot ==
Approximately 30 years after Altered Carbon, Takeshi Kovacs is now serving in Carrera's Wedge, a mercenary organization that joins a war on a distant planet, Sanction IV, fighting against an anti-corporate-government rebel group. Pilot Jan Schneider recruits Kovacs to help him lay claim to a buried Martian artefact. The artefact is a gate that opens a portal to a Martian starship. Kovacs and Schneider rescue Tanya Wardani, the archaeologue who coordinated the gate's discovery, from a prison camp. Unable to reach the heavily contested location alone, Kovacs enlists the support of the Mandrake Corporation, one of the corporate entities profiteering from the war. Mandrake is represented by an executive named Matthias Hand.

Kovacs and Hand select an elite squad of resurrected soldiers to accompany them. Hand secretly leaks information that prompts the rebels to destroy the city of Sauberville with a nuclear weapon. This clears the gate site of opposing forces, and the recovery expedition begins. However, the radiation severely damages the team's bodies, and they must work against the clock to find the ship before dying of radiation poisoning. While Wardani works to open the gate, someone sabotages the beacons necessary to claim the starship. Two expedition members are killed by nanodes deployed by Hand's rivals within the Mandrake firm.

The party goes through the portal and finds an inactive Martian starship, along with the bodies of Tanya's original archaeologue team. Mysteriously, it appears that the original team chose to die in space rather than inside the breathable air of the spaceship. Suspecting that Schneider is the saboteur, Kovacs confronts him. Schneider flees in the shuttle they arrived in, triggering a booby trap set by Kovacs and blowing the shuttle up.

During their exploration, the Martian starship is attacked by an unknown starship, which causes its automated defence systems to come online. During the attack the party begins to experience visions and emotions from the dead Martians, bringing them to the brink of insanity. Hand realises the danger and orders Kovacs to shoot the others with a stunning weapon to render them unconscious.

After the battle is over, Isaac Carrera and a Wedge unit arrive and imprison the remaining members of the squad. One member of Kovacs's squad, Sutjiadi, is wanted for killing an officer of the Wedge. The Wedge opts to torture him to death. During this public execution, Kovacs frees his squad and kills the Wedge unit. Kovacs then follows Carrera through the portal and kills him.

Kovacs realises that Tanya Wardani sabotaged the first archaeological team after discovering that they wanted to use the Martian ship as a weapon. She was responsible for the bodies they found, as well as the destroyed equipment in the shuttle. She decides to stay and oversee the recovery of the portal. Kovacs trades the rights to the Martian ship for safe passage out of the star system for the surviving members of his team.

== Themes ==
Writing for The Guardian, Colin Greenland found that Altered Carbon was about fighting against wealth and power. In contrast to the first novel, in which Kovacs was attempting to fight for human value, Greenland finds that "truth and justice ... are rarely the ethos, or the issue" in Broken Angels.

== Reception ==
Publishers Weekly wrote that the novel succeeded despite a formulaic structure, calling it a "superior, satisfying cyberpunk noir adventure". Kirkus Reviews wrote that the novel was a good expansion of the worldbuilding which began in the first novel, praising it as "a thrilling cyberpunk actioner" while stating that it occasionally overdid its world-weary tone.
