= Laeta Kalogridis =

American film producer

- Education: Davidson College; University of Texas at Austin; UCLA School of Theater, Film and Television
- Occupations: Screenwriter; film producer; television producer

Laeta Kalogridis (/ˈliːtə ˌkæləˈɡriːdɪs/ LEE-tə KAL-ə-GREE-diss) is an American screenwriter and television and film producer. She has written scripts for Alexander (2004), Night Watch (2004), Pathfinder (2007) and Shutter Island (2010). She also served as an executive producer for the television series Birds of Prey and Bionic Woman, and she co-wrote the screenplay for Terminator Genisys (2015) and Alita: Battle Angel (2019). She is the creator and executive producer of the Netflix series Altered Carbon (2018).

She is also the founder of the pro-union website Hollywood United and was involved as a peacemaker in the 2007–2008 Writers Guild of America strike. Kalogridis, formerly a member of Writers Guild of America West, left and maintained financial core status in 2022.

== Early life and education ==
Laeta Kalogridis is of Greek descent; her grandparents emigrated from Kalymnos in the early 20th century. She graduated the MFA program for screenwriting at UCLA School of Theater, Film and Television.

== Writing career ==
Early in her career, Kalogridis wrote a spec script about Joan of Arc titled In Nomine Dei. She sold the script to Warner Bros. in April 1994, but a film was not produced. In March 1995, she was a writer of the early script for the 2000 X-Men film. In late 1999, she did uncredited work on the script for Scream 3.

In September 2000, she was hired to write the screenplay for the 2001 film adaptation of Lara Croft: Tomb Raider. Kalogridis created, executive produced and wrote multiple episodes of the 2002 series Birds of Prey. In September 2003, she was involved in the rewrite of the Wonder Woman live action film adaptation for Warner Bros. Kalogridis wrote a draft of the 2004 film Catwoman but ultimately did not receive a screenwriting credit. She was next credited as the screenwriter of the English language version of the 2004 film Night Watch, and also wrote the script for the 2004 film Alexander.

In January 2005, she worked on a remake of The Lone Ranger for Columbia Pictures. In November 2005, she helped write Borgia, an ImageMovers film about the Borgia family in 15th century Rome. In February 2006 she began writing The Dive, director James Cameron's planned film about the freediver Francisco "Pipin" Ferraras and his wife Audrey Mestre.

In January 2007, she began writing Alita: Battle Angel, director James Cameron's planned film based on the classic cyberpunk manga Battle Angel Alita. In October 2007, she did a rewrite of the vampire film Darksiders for New Line Cinema. She was screenwriter for the 2007 film Pathfinder. She was also the executive producer for the 2007 TV series Bionic Woman, also writing the pilot. For Bionic Woman, she recalls being fired in part because she was told that she "didn't know how to write women," and was replaced by a male writer.

Kalogridis became involved as a peacemaker in the 2007–2008 Writers Guild of America strike, working with writers and producers to reach a solution. The New York Times reported her involvement, "Ms. Kalogridis and her friends... had become a pipeline to the guild members holding out for sizable gains, whose support would be needed if any deal was to be reached." She is also the founder of the pro-union website Hollywood United.

She was an executive producer of the 2009 blockbuster Avatar by director James Cameron. She was executive producer and screenwriter of the 2010 film Shutter Island. She produced the 2013 film White House Down. In 2013, she and Patrick Lussier were both named co-writers for the fifth film in the Terminator series, Terminator Genisys.

In 2018, she was producer for the film The House with a Clock in Its Walls. She was also creator, screenwriter, and executive producer of Altered Carbon, a Netflix scifi series which premiered in February 2018. She co-wrote the film adaptation of the manga Battle Angel Alita along with James Cameron and Robert Rodriguez, a film released on February 14, 2019. In 2016 she was reported to be writing and executive producing a live-action series of Sword Art Online for Netflix, noting in an interview that she was working to not "whitewash" the adaptation.. As of 2026, such a series has not premiered.

In May 2019, BuzzFeed News reported that Kalogridis had been hired in the spring of 2018 to write a film based on the 2003 video game Star Wars: Knights of the Old Republic, and that she was close to completing the first script of a potential trilogy based on the series. Representatives refused to comment, and as of 2026 nothing has been reported since.

She was writing and executive producing a project planning to feature actress Gal Gadot as Cleopatra in June 2022. As of 2026 the latest commentary about the progress of this project were made in 2023, by producer Charles Roven and Gal Gadot, respectively.

In 2026, Kalogridis was attached to The Patient, a horror drama developing at HBO starring Halle Berry.

== Filmography ==
†	Denotes productions that have not yet been released

=== Film ===
Year	Title	Writer	Executive producer
2004	Night Watch	Yes	No
2004	Alexander	Yes	No
2007	Pathfinder	Yes	No
2009	Avatar	No	Yes
2010	Shutter Island	Yes	Yes
2015	Terminator Genisys	Yes	Yes
2018	The House with a Clock in Its Walls	No	Yes
2018	American Dream/American Knightmare	No	Yes
2019	Alita: Battle Angel	Yes	No
2022	Ambulance	No	Yes
2025	Another Simple Favor	Yes	No

Producer

- White House Down (2013)

Uncredited script revisions

- X-Men (2000)
- Scream 3 (2000)
- Lara Croft: Tomb Raider (2001)
- Catwoman (2004)
- Knight and Day (2010)
- Ghost in the Shell (2017)
- Geostorm (2017)

Special thanks

- Dracula 2000 (2000)

Actor

- Still Screaming: The Ultimate Scary Movie Retrospective (2011) - Documentary film, herself

=== Television ===
Year	Title	Writer	Executive Producer	Creator	Notes
2002-2003	Birds of Prey	Yes	Yes	Yes	Wrote episodes "Premiere" and unaired pilot
2007	Bionic Woman	Yes	Yes	No	Episode: "Pilot" and the unaired pilot
2018-2020	Altered Carbon	Yes	Yes	Yes	Wrote 3 episodes
