= Takeshi Kovacs =

Fictional character

- Altered Carbon character
- First appearance: Altered Carbon (2002)
- Portrayed by: Joel Kinnaman (season 1); Anthony Mackie (season 2)
- Also portrayed by: Will Yun Lee (original); Morgan Gao (young); Byron Mann (season 1); Jihae (season 2)
- Voiced by: Tatsuhisa Suzuki (Japanese); Ray Chase (English)

In-universe information
- Gender: Male

Takeshi Lev Kovacs is the protagonist in the books Altered Carbon (2002), Broken Angels (2003), and Woken Furies (2005) by Richard K. Morgan, which take place in or around the 26th century.

== Fictional history ==
=== Novels ===
Kovacs was a human born November 23, 2100, in the city of Newpest on the planet Harlan's World. He is of Japanese and Eastern European descent.

Kovacs is a former Envoy, a member of an elite military force of futuristic soldiers, part intelligence operative and part shock trooper, trained to adapt quickly to new bodies and new environments. Envoys are used by the governing Protectorate to infiltrate and crush planetary unrest and maintain political stability. Envoy training is actually a form of psychospiritual conditioning that operates at subconscious levels.

After leaving the Envoys, Kovacs returned to criminal life and became a mercenary. He was eventually imprisoned, his cortical "stack" stored without a body (or "sleeve") for decades at a time as punishment, before being paroled or hired out to work high-risk situations.

Envoys possess total recall and are able to discern subtle patterns within seemingly unrelated events. They possess a thorough understanding of body language and vocal tonality, such that they can discern intention and manipulate others with ease. They are able to control their physiological and psychological responses, such as fear and anger, at will.

Another aspect that figures prominently in an Envoy's training is the systematic removal of every violence-limiting instinct a human is born with. Due to this training, most worlds prohibit past or present Envoys from holding any political or military office. The fear elicited by the mere mention of Envoys is often used by Kovacs to threaten and intimidate.

== Reception ==
Author Paul Di Filippo said of the character "Takeshi Kovacs has to be the worst friend you can have. Everyone who's affiliated with him eventually ends up slaughtered. His enemies die in smaller numbers than his buddies and allies. If you had a choice, you'd be wise to get on his bad side."

== Adaptations ==
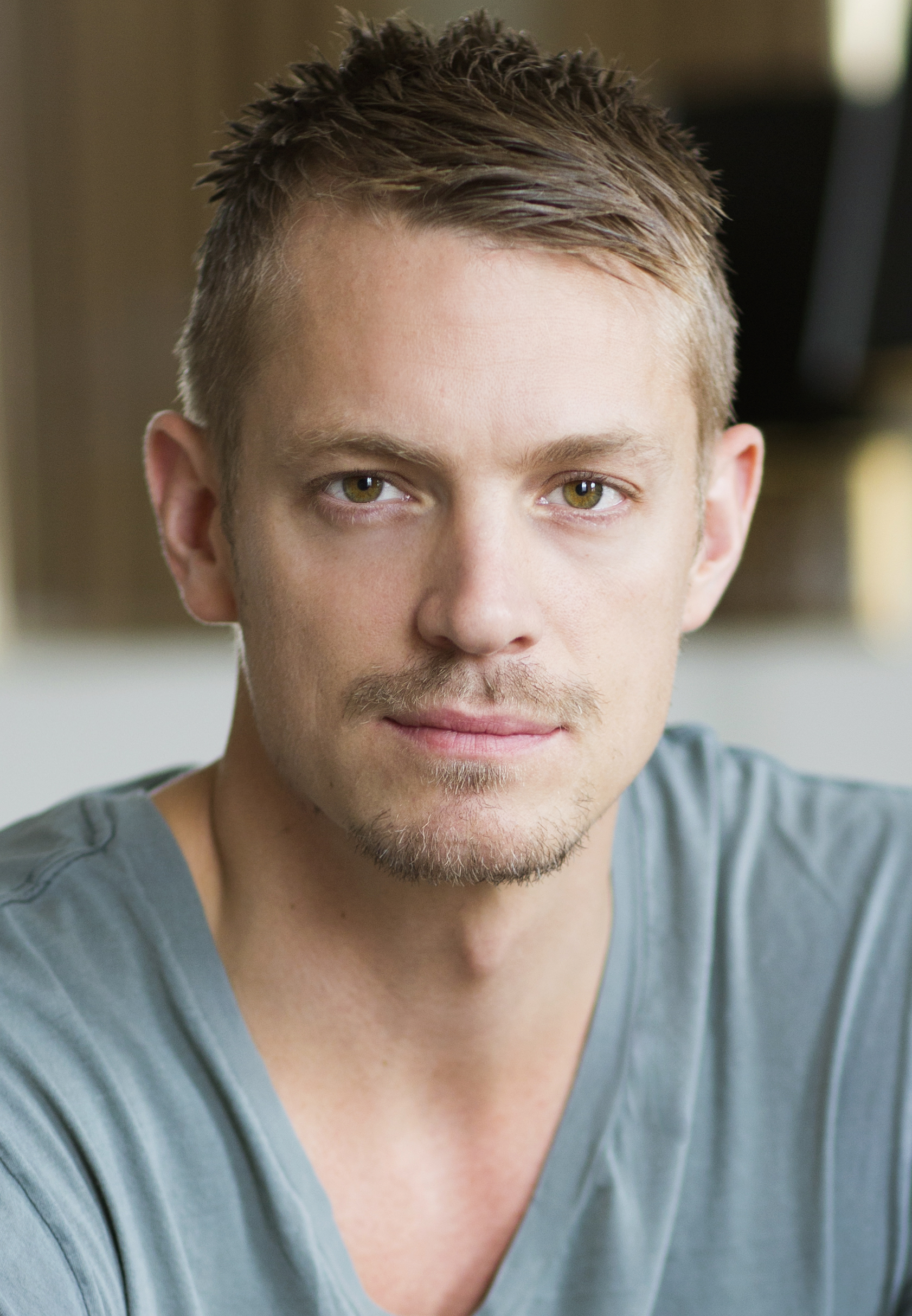
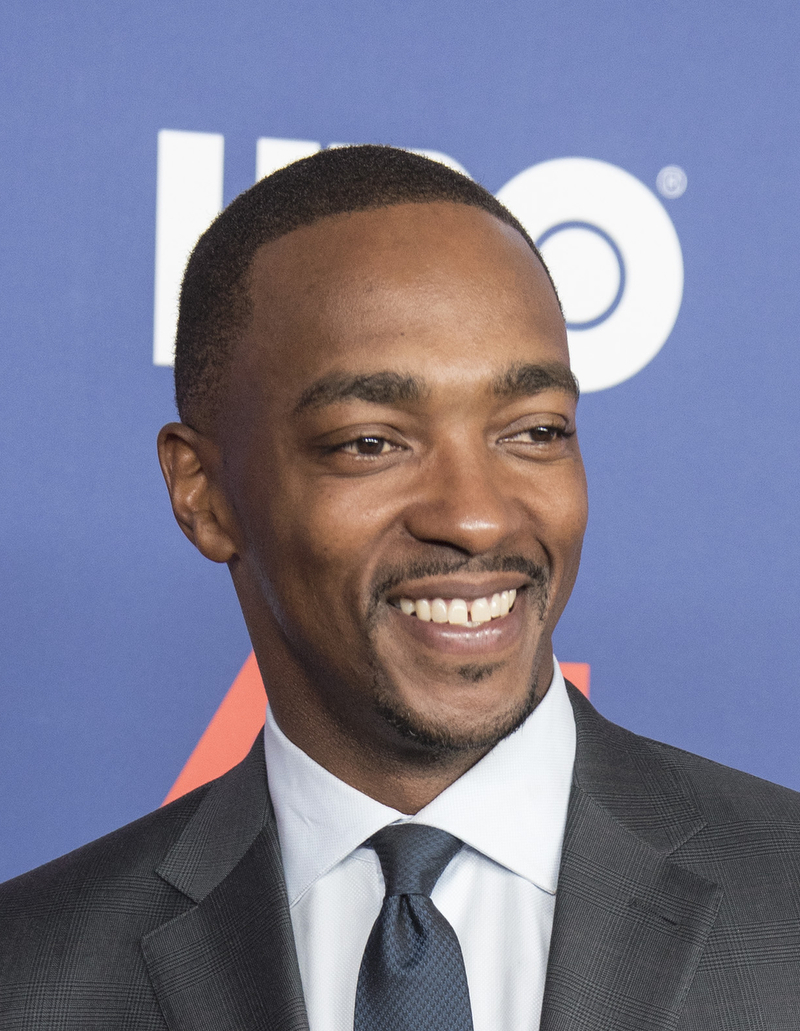
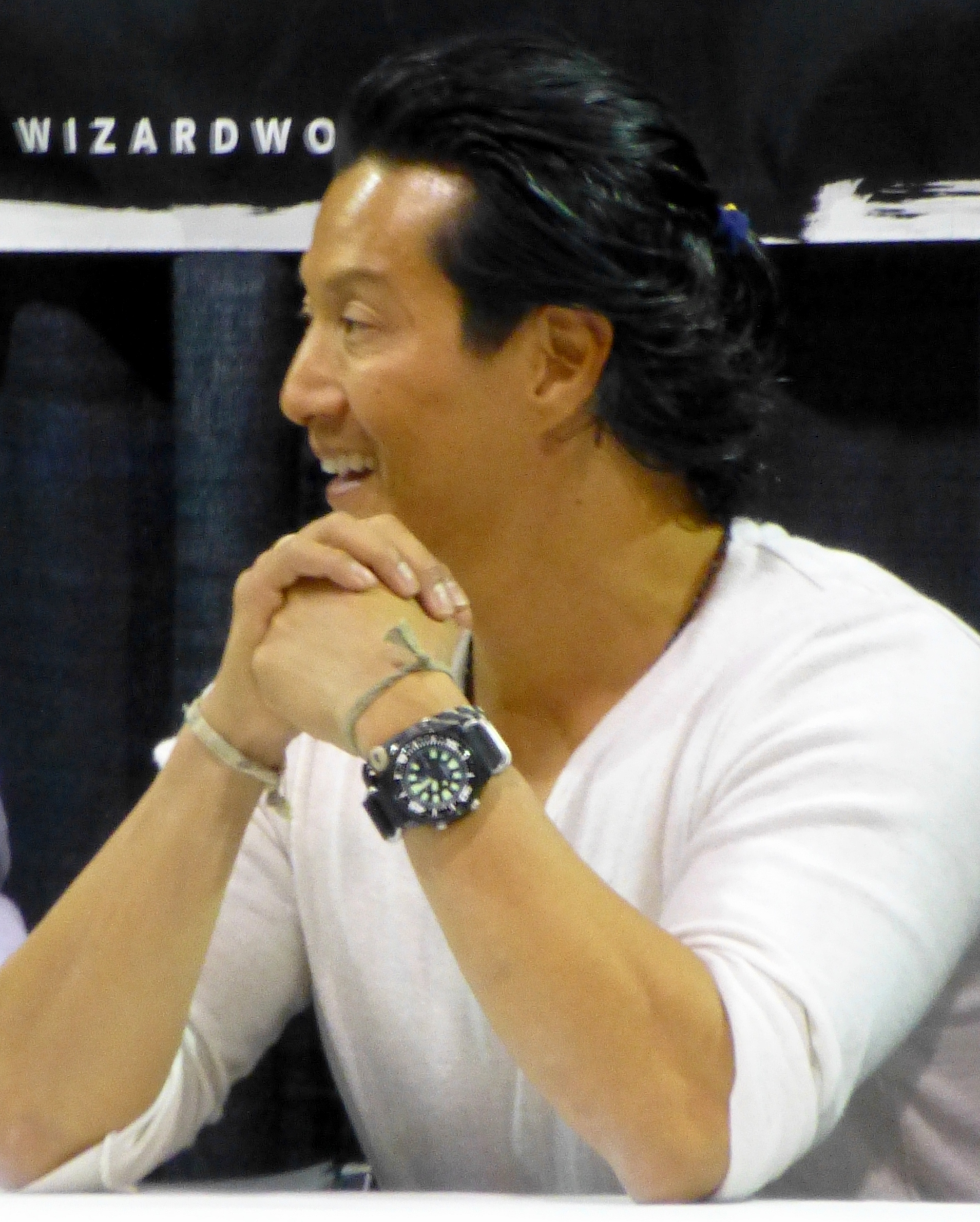
Joel Kinnaman, Anthony Mackie, and Will Yun Lee, (L-R) all played the character of Takeshi Kovacs.

In the Netflix series Altered Carbon, Kovacs is portrayed by Joel Kinnaman (in the body of Elias Ryker) in the show's first season, Will Yun Lee (original body), Byron Mann (Takeshi's prior body), and Morgan Gao (Young Tak). Anthony Mackie portrays the character in a different host body for the show's second season. Jihae played the character as a Torch Singer in the season 2 premiere episode. In the spin-off animated film Altered Carbon: Resleeved, Kovacs is voiced by Tatsuhisa Suzuki and Ray Chase in Japanese and English respectively.

The television adaptation makes several significant changes to the source material of the novels, including changing the nature of the Envoys to freedom fighters, creating a relationship between Takeshi and Quellcrist Falconer, and changing the character of Reileen Kawahara to be Takeshi's sister.
