= List of Gaylactic Spectrum Award winners and nominees for best other work =

Literary award for science fiction, fantasy and horror novels with LGBT themes

The Gaylactic Spectrum Award for Other Work is presented as part of the Gaylactic Spectrum Awards which are given to works of science fiction, fantasy and horror that explore LGBTQ (lesbian, gay, bisexual or transgender) topics in a positive way. They were founded in 1998, first presented by the Gaylactic Network in 1999, and in 2002 they were given their own organization, the Gaylactic Spectrum Awards Foundation.

Logo of the Gaylactic Spectrum Award Foundation

Awards are given in categories for novels, short fiction and best other work, although in some years the award for short fiction has not been presented due to lack of sufficient nominees or no nominee of high enough quality. Other categories have also been added and removed in intervening years, and works produced before the inception of the awards are eligible to be inducted into the "Hall of Fame". Each award consists of an etched image on lucite on a stand, using a spiral galaxy in a triangle logo, based on the logo of the Gaylactic Network. The award winner's name, work title, award year and award category are etched on a small plaque on the base or on the plexiglass itself. No cash award is associated with the other work award, and the cost of the awards is paid for through individual donations and fundraising events.

The other works category is open to submissions of works in any non-novel, non-short-fiction medium released during the prior calendar year in North America that includes "significant positive GLBT content". This includes: comic books, graphic novels, movies, television episodes, multimedia, anthologies, story collections, gaming products, artwork, music. The time-frame of eligibility is based on copyright date for first printing for written works, cover date for magazines and comic books, release date for films, and the first air date for television. The long list of nominees is reduced to a short list of finalists, and the results are generally announced and presented at Gaylaxicon, although they have also been presented at Worldcon in the past. This article lists all the "Best short fiction" award nominees and winners, and short fiction hall of fame inductees.

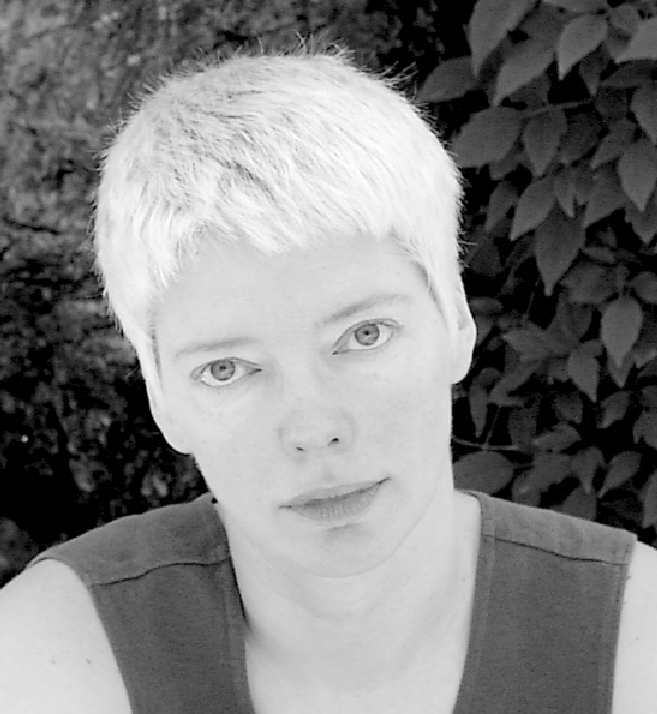
Nicola Griffith has won more than once

Nicola Griffith is the only creator to have won the other work award more than once, having won twice for editing anthologies; she was also nominated for once for her writing. The creators of Buffy the Vampire Slayer have the record for most nominations, with five, one of which won the award. Cecilia Tan has the record for most nominations without winning, having been a finalist three times for editing anthologies. The most recent winners of the award are an anthology of LGBT themed science fiction entitled The Future Is Queer, edited by Richard Labonté and Lawrence Schimel, the television series Torchwood, created by Russell T Davies, and the film V for Vendetta, all in 2007. No award was presented to any of the works in the 2008 shortlist.

== Winners and nominees ==
In the following table, the years correspond to the year of work's release; the ceremonies are always held the following year. Entries in bold and with a lavender background have won the relevant award; those that are neither highlighted nor in bold are the finalist nominees. Superscript letters after the result indicate simultaneous nominations in other categories, or other notes.

Winners and joint winners
Finalists/Short-listed nominees
No award given

Year	Author(s) / Editor(s) / Director(s)	Title	Publisher	Note	Result	Ref.
1999	Nicola Griffith & Stephen Pagel	Bending the Landscape: Science Fiction	Overlook	Anthology	Won	
1999	Bill Condon(dir.)	Gods and Monsters	Lions Gate Entertainment	Film	Nom	
1999	Lawrence Schimel (ed.)	Things Invisible to See	Ultra Violet	Anthology	Nom	
2000	Spike Jonze & Charlie Kaufman	Being John Malkovich	Single Cell Pictures / Gramercy Pictures / Propaganda Films	Film	Won	
2000	Trey Parker & Matt Stone	South Park: Bigger, Longer, Uncut	Paramount / Warner Bros. / Comedy Central	Film	Nom	
2000	Peter David	Supergirl issue #39, "On Ice"	DC Comics	Comic book issues	Nom	
2001	Joss Whedon et al.	Buffy the Vampire Slayer	Fox/WB	Television series	Won^{[A]}	
2001	Warren Ellis, Mark Millar et al.	The Authority: Under New Management	DC Comics	Graphic novel	Nom	
2001	Colleen Doran	A Distant Soil	Image comics	Comic book	Nom	
2001	Greg Egan	"Oracle"	Asimov's SF 07/00	Short fiction	Nom	
2001	Michael Rowe (ed.)	Queer Fear	Arsenal Pulp	Anthology	Nom	
2002	Nicola Griffith & Stephen Pagel	Bending the Landscape: Horror	Overlook	Anthology	Won	
2002	Joss Whedon et al.	Buffy the Vampire Slayer	Fox/WB/UPN	Television series	Nom	
2002	Elizabeth Watasin	Charm School #4	Slave Labor	Comic book issue	Nom	
2002	Robert Rodi	Codename: Knockout #0-#6	DC / Vertigo Comics	Comic book issues	Nom	
2002	Judd Winick	Green Lantern #137 & #140	DC Comics	Comic book issues	Nom	
2002	Cecilia Tan (ed.)	Sextopia	Circlet Press	Anthology	Nom	
2002	Steve Berman	Trysts	Lethe Press	Collection	Nom	
2002	Judd Winick	X-Force #117-118	Marvel Comics	Comic book issues	Nom	
2003	Mark Millar et al.	The Authority issues #28-29	DC Comics / Wildstorm	Comic book issues	Won^{[B]}	
2003	Judd Winick et al.	Green Lantern issues #154-155, "Hate Crime"	DC Comics	Comic book issues	Won^{[B]}	
2003	Michael Rowe (ed.)	Queer Fear II	Arsenal Pulp	Anthology	Won	
2003	Amber Benson & Christopher Golden	Buffy the Vampire Slayer - Willow and Tara: Wilderness	Dark Horse	Comic book series	Nom^{[B]}	
2003	Neil Gaiman & Craig Russell	Murder Mysteries	Dark Horse	Comic book series	Nom^{[B]}	
2003	Various	Uncanny X-Men #414	Marvel Comics	Comic book issue	Nom^{[B]}	
2003	Various	X-Statix #1-5	Marvel Comics	Comic book issues	Nom^{[B]}	
2003	Joss Whedon et al.	Buffy the Vampire Slayer episode, "Seeing Red"	Fox/WB/UPN	Television episode	Nom	
2003	R.H. Barlow, S. T. Joshi, Douglas Anderson & David Schultz	Eyes of the God: The Weird Fiction and Poetry of R.H. Barlow	Hippocampus Press	Academic collection	Nom	
2003	Cecilia Tan (ed.)	Mind & Body	Circlet Press	Anthology	Nom	
2003	Cecilia Tan (ed.)	Wired Hard 3	Circlet Press	Anthology	Nom	
2004	Tony Kushner	Angels in America	HBO	Television series	Won	
2004	Greg Rucka & Michael Lark	Gotham Central issues #6 - 10, "Half a Life"	DC Comics	Comic book issues	Won	
2004	Joss Whedon et al.	Buffy the Vampire Slayer	Fox/UPN	Television series	Nom	
2004	Various	Carnivàle	HBO	Television series	Nom	
2004	Stephen Godchaux & Bridget Carpenter	Dead Like Me episode "The Bicycle Thief"	Showtime	Television episode	Nom	
2004	Warren Ellis & Steve Dillon	Global Frequency #3	DC Comics	Comic book issue	Nom	
2005	No Award	—	—	—	—	
2005	Various	Drawn Together	Comedy Central	Television series	Nom	
2005	Ian Iqbal Rashid et al.	Touch of Pink	Sony Pictures Classics	Film	Nom	
2005	Greg Herren (ed.)	Shadows of the Night	Southern Tier	Anthology	Nom	
2005	Nicola Griffith	With Her Body	Aqueduct	Collection	Nom	
2006	No Award, nominees carried over to 2007	—	—	—	—	
2007	Richard Labonté & Lawrence Schimel (eds.)	The Future Is Queer	Arsenal Pulp	Anthology	Won	
2007	Russell T Davies et al.	Torchwood Season 1	BBC	Television series	Won	
2007	James McTeigue et al.	V for Vendetta	Warner Bros.	Film	Won	
2007	Catherynne M Valente	"The Dance of Uzume-no-Ama"	Prime Books	Poem, from Apocrypha	Nom	
2007	Russell T Davies et al.	Doctor Who episodes, "The Empty Child" & "The Doctor Dances"	BBC	Television episodes	Nom	
2007	Dave Jeser, Matthew Silverstein et al.	Drawn Together	Comedy Central	Television series	Nom	
2007	Shori Shiozu et al.	Eerie Queerie	TokyoPop	Manga	Nom	
2007	Don Sakers (ed.)	Gaylaxicon 2006 Sampler	Speed-of-C	Anthology	Nom	
2007	John Baumgartner et al.	Hard Pill	Stoebner / Baumgartner	Film	Nom	
2007	Joselle Vanderhooft (ed.)	Sleeping Beauty, Indeed	Torquere	Anthology	Nom	
2007	Allan Heinberg et al.	Young Avengers	Marvel Comics	Comic book series	Nom	
2008	Sean Abley et al.	Socket	Dark Blue Films, Velvet Candy	Film	Won	
2008	Jane Goldman, Matthew Vaughn et al.	Stardust	Paramount Pictures	Film	Won	
2008	Greg Rucka, Grant Morrison, Mark Waid, Geoff Johns et al.	52	DC Comics	Comic book series	Nom	
2008	Meredith Schwartz (ed.)	Alleys and Doorways	Torquere	Anthology	Nom	
2008	Ronald D Moore, Michael Taylor et al.	Battlestar Galactica: Razor	Universal, Sci-Fi Channel	Television episode	Nom	
2008	Joss Whedon et al.	Buffy the Vampire Slayer Season 8	Dark Horse Comics	Comic book series	Nom	
2008	Steve Berman (ed.)	So Fey: Queer Fairy Fiction	Lethe Press	Anthology	Nom	
2008	Catherine Tregenna, Russell T Davies, et al.	Torchwood episode, "Captain Jack Harkness"	BBC Wales	Television episode	Nom	
2008	Brian K Vaughan and Pia Guerra	Y: The Last Man	Vertigo, DC Comics	Comic book series	Nom	
2009 -	No Award	—	—	—	—	—

^{A} People's Choice award winner. ^{B} A separate Best Comic Book / Graphic novel category was created for one year.

== Other works Hall of Fame inductees ==
In the following table, the years correspond to the year of the award ceremonies; the works were all first published or broadcast before the founding of the awards in 1998. Listed here are all the works short listed for entry in the Hall of Fame that are not novels or short stories. A separate "Hall of Fame Media" category was created for the year 2000.

Inductees
Not inducted (NI)

Year	Author(s) / Editor(s) / Director(s)	Title	Publisher	Note	Result	Ref.
1999	Eric Garber & Lyn Paleo (eds.)	Uranian Worlds: A Guide to Alternative Sexuality in Science Fiction, Fantasy, and Horror	G K Hall	Non-fiction	Inducted	
2000	Donald P. Bellisario	Quantum Leap episode "Running for Honor"	Belisarius Productions	Media (TV)	Inducted	
2000	Richard O'Brien & Jim Sharman	The Rocky Horror Picture Show	20th Century Fox	Media (Film)	Inducted	
2000	Avery Brooks et al.	Star Trek: Deep Space Nine episode "Rejoined"	Paramount Television	Media (TV)	NI	
2002	Scott Lobdell et al.	Alpha Flight issue #106	Marvel Comics	Comic book	Inducted	

== See also ==
- LGBT themes in speculative fiction
- Lambda Literary Award for Speculative Fiction
- List of Gaylactic Spectrum Award winners and nominees for best novel
- List of Gaylactic Spectrum Award winners and nominees for best short fiction
