= List of Gaylactic Spectrum Award winners and nominees for best short fiction =

Literary award for science fiction, fantasy and horror novels with LGBT themes

The Gaylactic Spectrum Awards are given to works of science fiction, fantasy and horror that explore LGBTQ (lesbian, gay, bisexual or transgender) topics in a positive way. They were founded in 1998, first presented by the Gaylactic Network in 1999, and in 2002 they were given their own organization, the Gaylactic Spectrum Awards Foundation.

Awards are given in categories for novels, short fiction and best other work, although in some years the award for short fiction has not been presented due to lack of sufficient nominees or no nominee of high enough quality. Other categories have also been added and removed in intervening years, and works produced before the inception of the awards are eligible to be inducted into the "Hall of Fame". The short fiction category is open to submissions of short written works released during the prior calendar year in North America that includes "significant positive GLBT content". The long list of nominees is reduced to a short list of finalists, and the results are generally announced and presented at Gaylaxicon, a convention dedicated to LGBT science fiction, although they have also been presented at Worldcon in the past. This article lists all the "Best short fiction" award nominees and winners, and short fiction hall of fame inductees.

Each award consists of an etched image on lucite on a stand, using a spiral galaxy in a triangle logo, which is based on the logo the Gaylactic Network. The award winner's name, work title, award year and award category are etched on a small plaque on the base or on the plexiglass itself. A small cash stipend is awarded to winners in the Best Short Fiction category. The cost of the awards is paid for through individual donations and fundraising events.

Logo of the Gaylactic Spectrum Award Foundation

Steve Berman has the record for most nominations, having been a finalist four times without winning. No writer has won the short fiction award more than once. Per Locus, the most recent short fiction award was given in 2010.

== Winners and nominees ==
In the following table, the years correspond to the year of the award ceremonies; the books were released in the preceding years. Entries with a lavender background have won the relevant award; those with a white background are the finalist nominees. Superscript letters after the result indicate simultaneous nominations in other categories.

Winners and joint winners
Finalists/Short-listed nominees
No award given

Year	Author(s)	Title	Published in	Publisher	Result	Ref.
1999	No Award	—	—	—	NA	
2000	Eleanor Arnason	"Dapple"	Asimov's SF 09/99	Bantam; Dell	Won	
2000	Esther Friesner	"Chanoyu"	Asimov's SF 03/99	Bantam; Dell	Nom	
2000	Storm Constantine	"The Thorn Boy"	Novella	Eidolon	Nom	
2001	No Award	—	—	—	NA^{[A]}	
2001	Greg Egan	"Oracle"	Asimov's SF 07/00	Bantam; Dell	Nom^{[A]}	
2002	Alexis Glynn Latner	"Kindred"	Bending the Landscape: Horror	Overlook	Won	
2002	Steve Berman	"The Anthvoke"	Strange Horizons & Trysts	Lethe Press	Nom	
2002	Ian Phillips	"The Devil and Mrs. Faust"	See Dick Deconstruct	Attagirl Press	Nom	
2002	M. Shayne Bell	"If On A Moonlit Night"	Realms of Fantasy 12/01	Sovereign Media	Nom	
2002	Carrie Richerson	"Love On A Stick"	Bending the Landscape: Horror	Overlook	Nom	
2002	Mark Tiedemann	"Passing"	Bending the Landscape: Horror	Overlook	Nom	
2002	Nisi Shawl	"Shiomah's Land"	Asimov's SF 03/01	Bantam; Dell	Nom	
2002	Catherine Asaro	"Soul of Light"	Sextopia	Circlet Press	Nom	
2002	Ellen Klages	"Triangle"	Bending the Landscape: Horror	Overlook	Nom	
2003	Sarah Monette	"Three Letters from the Queen of Elfland"	Lady Churchill's Rosebud Wristlet #11	Small Beer Press	Won	
2003	Scott Treleaven	"Bugcrush"	Queer Fear 2	Arsenal Pulp Press	Nom	
2003	Robert Knippenberg	"For the Mortals Among Us"	Mind & Body	Circlet Press	Nom	
2003	Michael Thomas Ford	"Night of the Werepuss"	Queer Fear 2	Arsenal Pulp	Nom	
2003	David Nickle	"Polyphemus' Cave"	Queer Fear 2	Arsenal Pulp	Nom	
2003	Stephen Dedman	"Till Human Voices Wake Us"	Queer Fear 2	Arsenal Pulp	Nom	
2003	MCA Hogarth	"Unspeakable"	Strange Horizons	Strangehorizons.com	Nom	
2004	Barth Anderson	"Lark Till Dawn, Princess"	Mojo: Conjure Stories	Warner Aspect	Won	
2004	Tim Pratt	"Down With the Lizards and the Bees"	Realms of Fantasy 08/03	Sovereign Media	Nom	
2004	Warren Rochelle	"The Golden Boy"	Silver Gryphon	Golden Gryphon	Nom	
2004	Steve Berman	"Kiss"	X-Factor 10/03	Magazine	Nom	
2004	Tim Pratt	"Living With the Harpy"	Strange Horizons	Strangehorizons.com	Nom	
2004	Beth Bernobich	"Poison"	Strange Horizons	Strangehorizons.com	Nom	
2004	A M Dellamonica	"The Riverboy"	Land/Space	Tesseract	Nom	
2004	Nisi Shawl	"The Tawny Bitch"	Mojo: Conjure Stories	Warner Aspect	Nom	
2004	Nancy Jane Moore	"Walking Contradiction"	Imaginings: An Anthology of Long Short Fiction	Pocket Books	Nom	
2005	Richard Hall	"Country People"	Shadows of the Night	Southern Tier	Won	
2005	Catherine Lundoff	"At the Roots of the World Tree"	Kenoma	E-zine	Nom	
2005	Colleen Anderson	"Hold Back The Night"	Open Space	Red Deer	Nom	
2005	Jaye Lawrence	"Kissing Frogs"	Fantasy & Science Fiction 05/04	Spilogale Inc	Nom	
2005	David McConnell	"The Mask"	Shadows of the Night	Southern Tier	Nom	
2005	Therese Szymanski	"The Morning After"	Shadows of the Night	Southern Tier	Nom	
2005	Charles Coleman Finlay	"Pervert"	Fantasy & Science Fiction 03/04	Spilogale Inc	Nom	
2005	Carol Rosenfeld	"Rabbit Rerun"	Shadows of the Night	Southern Tier	Nom	
2005	Nicola Griffith	"Song of Bullfrogs, Cry of Geese"	With her Body	Aqueduct	Nom	
2006	No Award (nominees carried over to next year)	—	—	—	NA	
2007	David Gerrold	"In the Quake Zone"	Down These Dark Spaceways	SFBC	Won (joint)	
2007	Joy Parks	"Instinct"	The Future Is Queer	Arsenal Pulp	Won (joint)	
2007	Christopher Barzak	"The Language of Moths"	Realms of Fantasy	Sovereign Media	Won (joint)	
2007	Rachel Pollack	"The Beatrix Gates"	The Future Is Queer	Arsenal Pulp	Nom	
2007	Catherynne M Valente	"Bones Like Black Sugar"	Fantasy magazine	Prime	Nom	
2007	Jennifer Pelland	"The Captive Girl"	Helix SF 08/06	Helix	Nom	
2007	Steve Berman	"Caught by Skin"	Sex in the System	Thunder's Mouth	Nom	
2007	Alexander Potter	"Facing Down Your Demons"	All Hell Breaking Loose	DAW	Nom	
2007	L-J Baker	"Fairy Tale Ending"	Tales from the Asylum	From the Asylum	Nom	
2007	L Timmel Duchamp	"Obscure Relations"	The Future Is Queer	Arsenal Pulp	Nom	
2007	Camilla Bruce	"Plums"	Shifting Again	Torquere	Nom	
2007	Alex Draven	"Sleeping Bears Lie"	Shifting Too	Torquere	Nom	
2007	Kristina Wright	"The Specter of Sin"	Call of the Dark	Bella Books	Nom	
2007	Richard Bowes	"There's a Hole in the City"	SciFiction	SciFi.Com	Nom	
2007	Kimberly DeCina	"Voce"	Sleeping Beauty, Indeed	Torquere	Nom	
2007	Julia Watts	"We Recruit"	Stake Through the Heart	Bella	Nom	
2008	Joshua Lewis	"Ever So Much More Than Twenty"	So Fey	Lethe Press	Won	
2008	K.S. Augustin	"Prime Suspect"	eBook	Total-E-Bound	Nom	
2008	Steve Berman	"Bittersweet"	Journal of Mythic Arts	Endicott Studio	Nom	
2008	Holly Black	"The Coat of Stars"	So Fey	Lethe Press	Nom	
2008	Cassandra Clare & Ruby deBrazier	"Charming, A Tale of True Love"	So Fey	Lethe Press	Nom	
2008	M. Decker	"Side Effects"	Alleys & Doorways	Torquere	Nom	
2008	Leigh Ellwood	"The Healing"	eBook	Phaze	Nom	
2008	Craig Gidney	"A Bird of Ice"	So Fey	Lethe Press	Nom	
2008	James Patrick Kelly	"Dividing the Sustain"	New Space Opera	Eos	Nom	
2008	Kiernan Kelly	"Dancing on the Head of a Pin"	eBook	Torquere	Nom	
2008	Valerie Z. Lewis	"The Steel Anniversary"	Alleys & Doorways	Torquere	Nom	
2008	Catherine Lundoff	"Medusa's Touch"	Crave: Tales of Lust, Love, and Longing	Lethe Press	Nom	
2008	Julia Talbot	"The Reflection of Love"	Alleys & Doorways	Torquere	Nom	
2008	JoSelle Vanderhooft	"Were"	Alleys & Doorways	Torquere	Nom	
2009	No Award (nominees carried over to next year)	—	—	—	NA	
2010	Hal Duncan	"The Behold of the Eye"	Lone Star Stories/Wilde Stories 2009'	Lethe Press	Won (joint)	
2010	Melissa Scott	"The Rocky Side of the Sky"	Periphery	Lethe Press	Won (joint)	
2010	Carolyn Ives Gilman	"Angels Alone"	Periphery	Lethe Press	Nom	
2010	Joel Lane	"Behind the Curtain"	Dark Horizons Issue 52/Wilde Stories 2009	Lethe Press	Nom	
2010	Jameson Currier	"The Bloomsbury Nudes"	Unspeakable Horror: From the Shadows of the Closet	Dark Scribe Press	Nom	
2010	Kaite Walsh	"City of the Dead"	Haunted Hearths and Sapphic Shades	Lethe Press	Nom	
2010	Alex Jeffers	"Firooz and His Brother"	Magazine of Fantasy and Science Fiction May 2008/Wilde Stories	Lethe Press	Nom	
2010	Amber Dawn	"Here Lies the Last Lesbian Rental in East Vancouver"	Fist of the Spider Woman	Arsenal Pulp Press	Nom	
2010	Michelle Scalise	"I Am the Shadow That Walks There"	Unspeakable Horror: From the Shadows of the Closet	Dark Scribe Press	Nom	
2010	Lee Thomas	"I'm Your Violence"	Unspeakable Horror: From the Shadows of the Closet	Dark Scribe Press	Nom	
2010	Aurelia T. Evans	"In Circles"	Fist of the Spider Woman	Arsenal Pulp Press	Nom	
2010	Chaz Brenchley	"In the Night Street Baths"	Lace and Blade - Norilana Books/Wilde Stories 2009	Lethe Press	Nom	
2010	Melissa Scott	"One Horse Town"	Haunted Hearths and Sapphic Shades	Lethe Press	Nom	
2010	Kal Cobalt	"Parts"	Wired Hard 4	Circlet Press	Nom	
2010	Astrid Amara	"Remember"	Tangle	Blind Eye Books	Nom	
2010	Zachary Jernigan	"The Succession of Knoorikios Khnum"	Wired Hard 4	Circlet Press	Nom	
2010	Lyn McConchie	"Waiting Tables and Time"	Haunted Hearths and Sapphic Shades	Lethe Press	Nom	
2011 -	No Award	—	—	—	NA	

^{A} Short fiction was part of other works this year.

== Short fiction Hall of Fame inductees ==
In the following table, the years correspond to the year of the award ceremonies; the works were all first published before the founding of the awards in 1998. As of 2008, one short story has been inducted into the Hall of Fame:

Year	Author(s)	Title	Published in	Publisher	Result	Ref.
2000	Theodore Sturgeon	"The World Well Lost"	Universe 06/1953	Clark Publishing	Inducted	

== See also ==
- LGBT themes in speculative fiction
- Lambda Literary Award for Speculative Fiction
- List of Gaylactic Spectrum Award winners and nominees for best novel
- List of Gaylactic Spectrum Award winners and nominees for best other work
