= LGBTQ themes in speculative fiction =

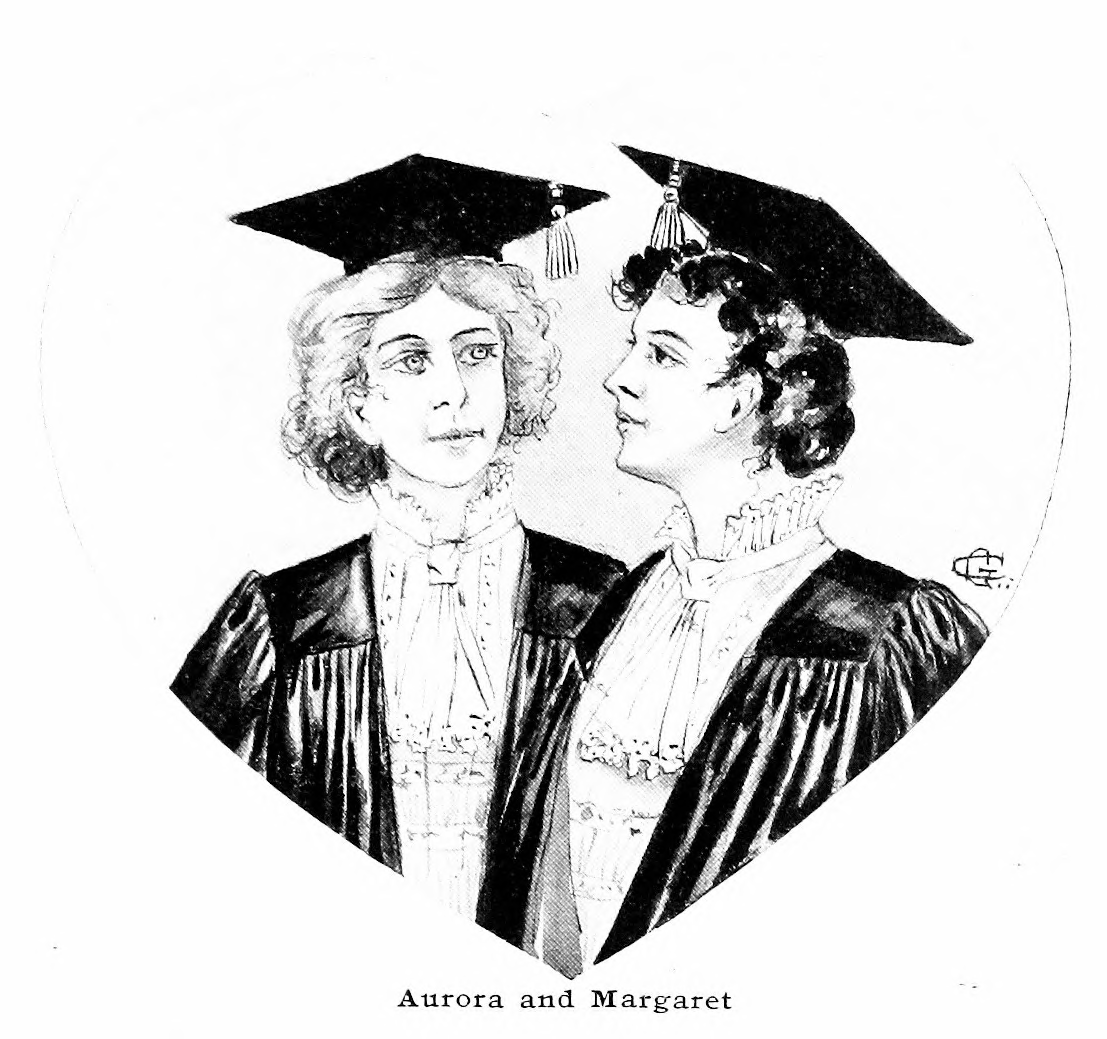
Aurora and Margaret, the heroines of Gregory Casparian's 1906 lesbian science fiction novel An Anglo-American Alliance: A Serio-Comic Romance and Forecast of the Future

LGBTQ themes in speculative fiction include lesbian, gay, bisexual, transgender, or queer (LGBTQ) themes in science fiction, fantasy, horror fiction and related genres.^{[a]} Such elements may include an LGBTQ character as the protagonist or a major character, or explorations of sexuality or gender that deviate from the heteronormative.

Science fiction and fantasy have traditionally been aimed at a male readership, and can be more restricted than non-genre literature by their conventions of characterisation and the effect that these conventions have on depictions of sexuality and gender. However, speculative fiction also gives authors and readers the freedom to imagine societies that are different from real-life cultures. This freedom makes speculative fiction a useful means of examining sexual bias, by forcing the reader to reconsider their heteronormative cultural assumptions. It has also been claimed by critics such as Nicola Griffith that LGBTQ readers identify strongly with the mutants, aliens, and other outsider characters found in speculative fiction.

== History ==
Before the 1960s, explicit sexuality of any kind was rare in speculative fiction, as the editors who controlled what was published attempted to protect their perceived key market of adolescent male readers. As the readership broadened, it became possible to include characters who were undisguised homosexuals, though these tended to be villains, and lesbians remained almost entirely unrepresented. In the 1960s, science fiction and fantasy began to reflect the changes prompted by the civil rights movement and the emergence of a counterculture. New wave and feminist science fiction authors realised cultures in which homosexuality, bisexuality and a variety of gender models were the norm, and in which sympathetic depictions of alternative sexuality were commonplace.

From the 1980s onwards, homosexuality gained much wider mainstream acceptance and was often incorporated into otherwise conventional speculative fiction stories. Works emerged that went beyond simple representation of homosexuality to explorations of specific issues relevant to the LGBT community. This development was helped by the growing number of openly gay or lesbian authors and their early acceptance by speculative fiction fandom. Specialist gay publishing presses and a number of awards recognising LGBT achievements in the genre emerged, and by the twenty-first century, blatant homophobia was no longer considered acceptable by most readers of speculative fiction.

There was a concurrent increase in representation of homosexuality within non-literary forms of speculative fiction. The inclusion of LGBT themes in comic books, television and film continues to attract media attention and controversy, while the perceived lack of sufficient representation, along with unrealistic depictions, provokes criticism from LGBT sources.

== Critical analysis ==
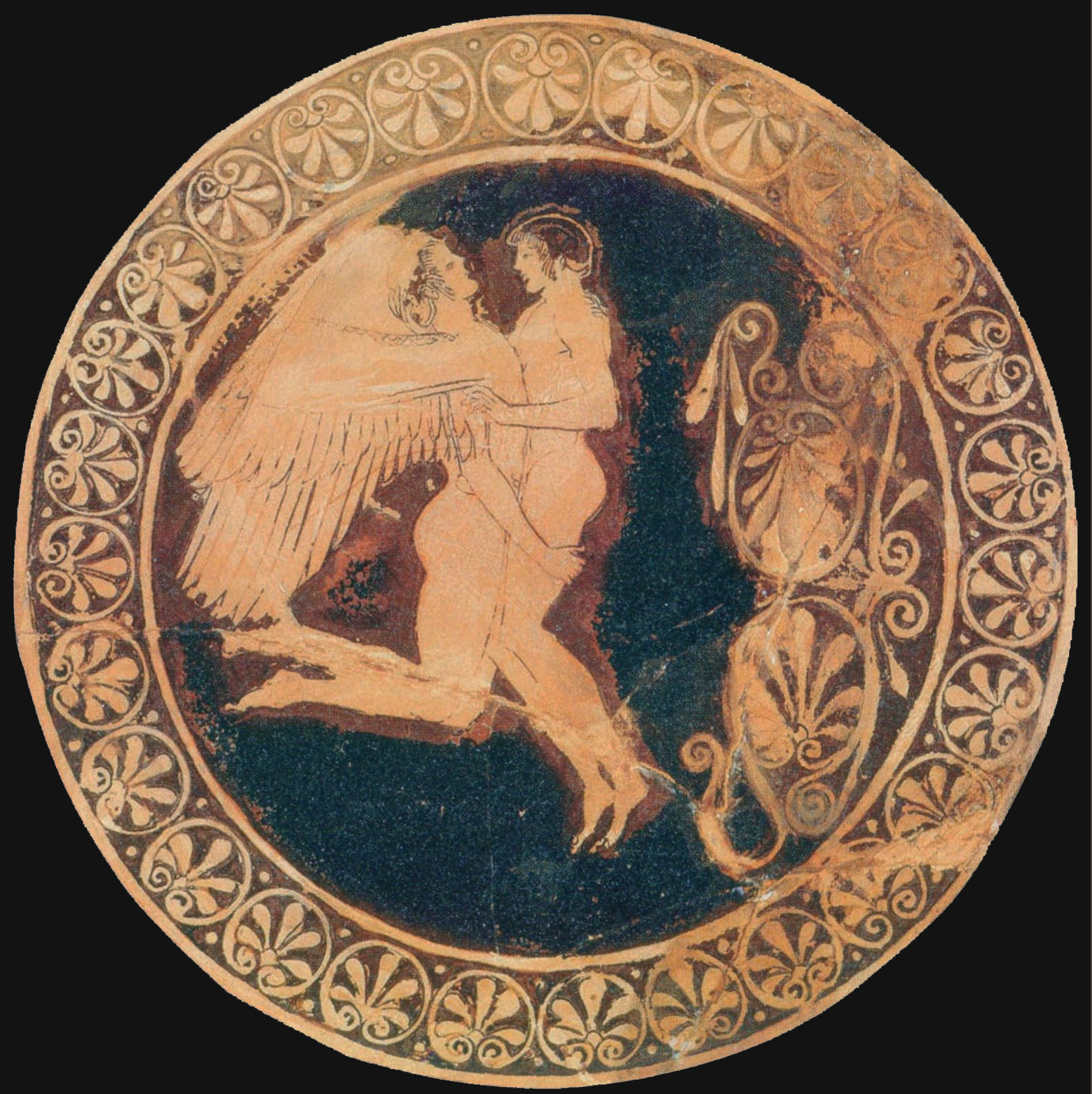
Zephyrus and Hyacinthus: Greek mythology, which often features homosexuality, is a source for much modern speculative fiction and mythic figures continue to appear in fantasy stories.

As genres of popular literature, science fiction (SF) and fantasy often seem more constrained than non-genre literature by their conventions of characterisation and the effects that these conventions have on depictions of sexuality and gender. Science fiction in particular has traditionally been a puritanical genre oriented toward a male readership. Sex is often linked to disgust in SF and horror, and plots based on sexual relationships have mainly been avoided in genre fantasy narratives. On the other hand, science fiction and fantasy can also provide more freedom than realistic literature to imagine alternatives to the default assumptions of heterosexuality and masculinity that permeate many cultures. Homosexuality is now an accepted and common feature of science fiction and fantasy literature, its prevalence due to the influence of lesbian-feminist and gay liberation movements.

In speculative fiction, extrapolation allows writers to focus not on the way things are (or were), as non-genre literature does, but on the way things could be different. It provides science fiction with a quality that science fiction critic Darko Suvin has called "cognitive estrangement": the recognition that what we are reading is not the world as we know it, but a world whose differences force us to reconsider our own with an outsider's perspective. When the extrapolation involves sexuality or gender, it can force the reader to reconsider their heteronormative cultural assumptions; the freedom to imagine societies different from real-life cultures makes SF an effective tool for examining sexual bias. In science fiction, such estranging features include technologies that significantly alter sex or reproduction. In fantasy, such features include figures such as mythological deities and heroic archetypes, who are not limited by preconceptions of human sexuality and gender, allowing them to be reinterpreted. SF has also depicted a plethora of alien methods of reproduction and sex, some of which can be viewed as homo- or bisexual through a human binary-gender lens.

In spite of the freedom offered by the genres, gay characters often remain contrived and stereotypical, and most SF stories take for granted the continuation of heteronormative institutions. Alternative sexualities have usually been approached allegorically, or by including LGBT characters in such a way as to not contradict mainstream society's assumptions about gender roles. Works that feature gay characters are more likely to be written by women writers, and to be viewed as being aimed at other women or girls; big-name male writers are less likely to explore gay themes.

Speculative fiction has traditionally been "straight"; Samuel R. Delany has written that the science fiction community is predominantly made up of white male heterosexuals, but that the proportion of minorities, including gay people, is generally higher than found in a "literary" group. The inclusion of homosexuality in SF has been described in Science Fiction Culture as "sometimes lagging behind the general population, sometimes surging ahead". Nicola Griffith has written that LGBT readers tend to identify strongly with the outsider status of mutants, aliens, and characters who lead hidden or double lives in science fiction. In comparison, Geoff Ryman has claimed that the gay and SF genre markets are incompatible, with his books being marketed as one or the other, but never both, and David Seed said that SF purists have denied that SF that focuses on soft science fiction themes and marginalised groups (including "gay SF") is "real" science fiction. Gay and lesbian science fiction have at times been grouped as distinct subgenres of SF, and have some tradition of separate publishers and awards.

== Literature ==
=== Early speculative fiction ===
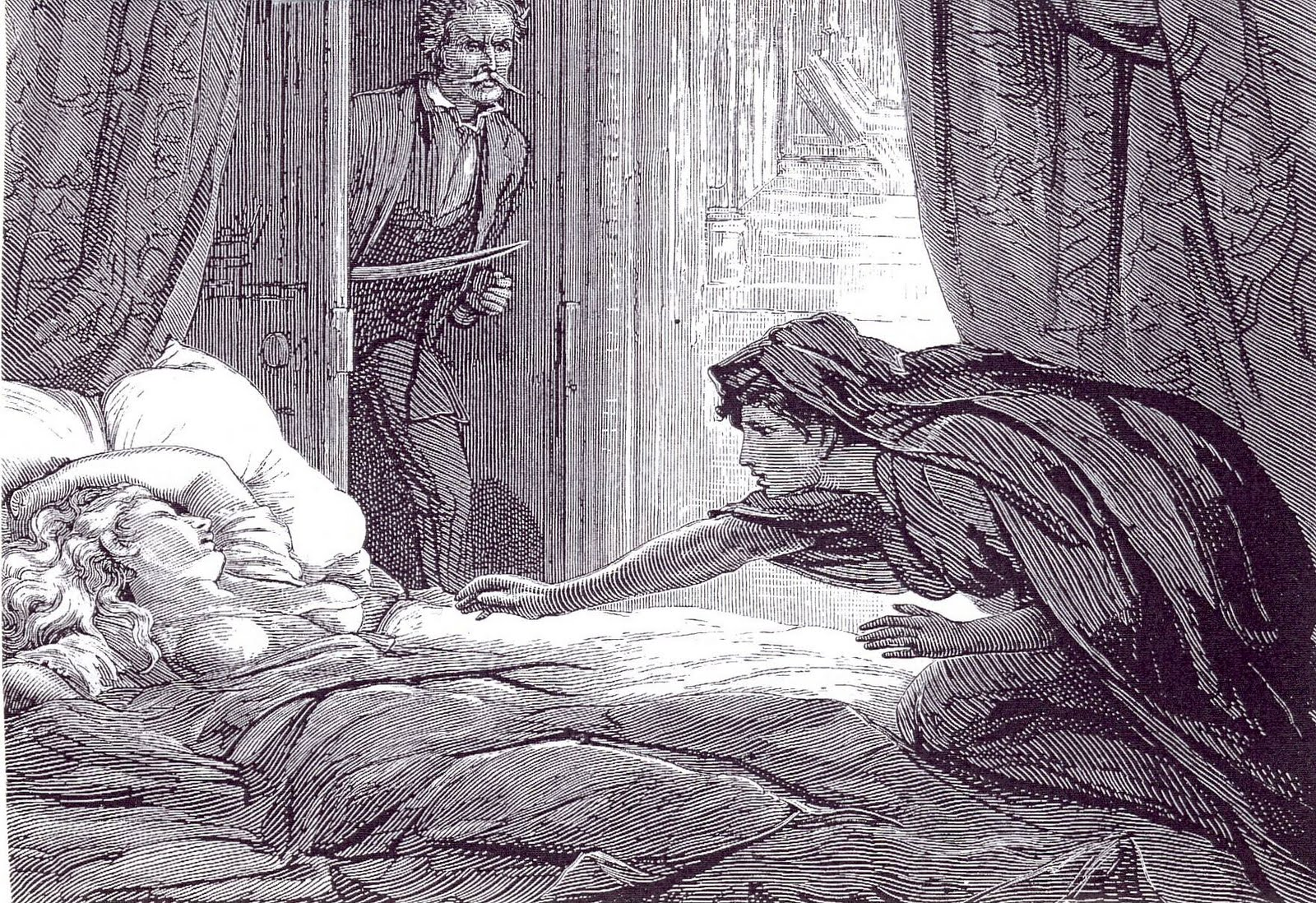
Illustration by D. H. Friston that accompanied the first publication of lesbian vampire novella Carmilla in The Dark Blue magazine in 1872

A True History by the Greek writer Lucian (A.D. 120–185) is noted for both its fantastical setting and its depiction of sexuality, being termed by some as the earliest surviving example of science fiction or the first ever "gay science fiction story". The narrator is suddenly enveloped by a typhoon and swept up to the moon, which is inhabited by a society of men that are at war with the sun. After the hero distinguishes himself in combat, the king gives him his son the prince in marriage. The all-male society reproduces (male children only) by giving birth from the thigh or by growing a child from a plant produced by planting the left testicle in the moon's soil.

In other fantastical works, sex itself, of any type, was equated with base desires or "beastliness", as in Gulliver's Travels, which contrasts the animalistic and overtly sexual Yahoos with the reserved and intelligent Houyhnhnms. The frank treatment of sexual topics of pre-nineteenth century literature was abandoned in most speculative fiction, although Wendy Pearson has written that issues of gender and sexuality have been central to SF since its inception but were ignored by readers and critics until the late twentieth century. Early works that contained LGBT themes and showed the gay characters to be morally impure include the first lesbian vampire story Carmilla (1872) by Sheridan Le Fanu^{[b]} and The Picture of Dorian Gray (1890) by Oscar Wilde, which shocked contemporary readers with its sensuality and overtly homosexual characters.

An Anglo-American Alliance, a 1906 novel by Gregory Casparian, was the first speculative novel to openly portray a lesbian romantic relationship.

=== Pulp era (1920–30s) ===
During the pulp era, explicit sexuality of any kind was rare in genre science fiction and fantasy. For many years, the editors who controlled what was published felt that they had to protect the adolescent male readership that they identified as their principal market. Although the covers of some 1930s pulp magazines showed scantily clad women menaced by tentacled aliens, the covers were often more lurid than the magazines' contents. In such a context, writers like Edgar Pangborn, who featured passionate male friendships in his work, were exceptional; almost until the end of their careers, including so much as a kiss would have been too much. Implied or disguised sexuality was as important as that which was openly revealed. As such, genre SF reflected the social mores of the day, paralleling common prejudices; this was particularly true of pulp fiction, more so than literary works of the time.

As the demographics of the readership broadened, it became possible to include characters who were more or less undisguised homosexuals, but these, in accordance with the attitudes of the times, tended to be villains: evil, demented, or effeminate stereotypes. The most popular role for the homosexual was as a 'decadent slaveholding lordling' whose corrupt tyranny was doomed to be overthrown by the young male heterosexual hero. During this period, lesbians were almost entirely unrepresented as either heroes or villains.

One of the earliest examples of genre science fiction that involves a challenging amount of unconventional sexual activity is the early novel Odd John (1935), by Olaf Stapledon. John is a mutant with extraordinary mental abilities who will not allow himself to be bound by many of the rules imposed by the ordinary British society of his time. The novel strongly implies that he seduces an older boy who becomes devoted to him but also suffers from the affront that the relationship creates to his own morals.

=== Golden Age (1940–50s) ===
In the Golden Age of Science Fiction, the genre "resolutely ignored the whole subject" of homosexuality, according to Joanna Russ. As the readership for science fiction and fantasy began to age in the 1950s, however, writers like Philip José Farmer and Theodore Sturgeon were able to introduce more explicit sexuality into their work. Until the late 1960s, however, few other writers depicted alternative sexuality or revised gender roles, or openly investigated sexual questions. The majority of LGBT characters were depicted as caricatures, such as "man-hating amazons", and attempts at portraying homosexuals sympathetically or non-stereotypically were met with hostility.

Sturgeon wrote many stories during the Golden Age of Science Fiction that emphasised the importance of love, regardless of the current social norms. In his short story "The World Well Lost" (1953),^{[c]} first published in Universe magazine, homosexual alien fugitives and unrequited (and taboo) human homosexual love are portrayed. The tagline for the Universe cover was "[His] most daring story"; its sensitive treatment of homosexuality was unusual for science fiction published at that time, and it is now regarded as a milestone in science fiction's portrayal of homosexuality. According to an anecdote related by Samuel R. Delany, when Sturgeon first submitted the story, the editor (Haywood Braun) not only rejected it but phoned every other editor he knew and urged them to reject it as well. Sturgeon would later write Affair with a Green Monkey, which examined social stereotyping of homosexuals, and in 1960 published Venus Plus X, in which a single-gender society is depicted and the protagonist's homophobia portrayed unfavourably.

Images of homosexual male societies remained strongly negative in the eyes of most SF authors. For example, when overpopulation drives the world away from heterosexuality in Charles Beaumont's short story "The Crooked Man" (1955), first published in Playboy, inhumane homosexuals begin to oppress the heterosexual minority. In Anthony Burgess's The Wanting Seed (1962) homosexuality is required for official employment; Burgess treats this as one aspect of an unnatural state of affairs which includes violent warfare and the failing of the natural world.

Although not usually identified as a genre writer, William S. Burroughs produced works with a surreal narrative that estranged the action from the ordinary world as science fiction and fantasy do. In 1959 he published Naked Lunch, the first of many works such as The Nova Trilogy and The Wild Boys in which he linked drug use and homosexuality as anti-authoritarian activities.

=== New Wave era (1960–70s) ===
In a little more than a decade, from the late 1960s to 1980, the number of works which contained homosexuality in science fiction and fantasy more than doubled all that had come previously.

— Eric Garber, Lyn Paleo, "Preface" in Uranian worlds.

By the late 1960s, science fiction and fantasy began to reflect the changes prompted by the civil rights movement and the emergence of a counterculture. Within the genres, these changes were incorporated into a movement called "the New Wave," a movement more sceptical of technology, more liberated socially, and more interested in stylistic experimentation. New Wave writers were more likely to claim an interest in "inner space" instead of outer space. They were less shy about explicit sexuality and more sympathetic to reconsiderations of gender roles and the social status of sexual minorities. Under the influence of New Wave editors and authors such as Michael Moorcock (editor of the influential New Worlds), sympathetic depictions of alternative sexuality and gender multiplied in science fiction and fantasy, becoming commonplace. The introduction of gay imagery has also been attributed to the influence of lesbian-feminist and gay liberation movements in the 1960s. In the 1970s, lesbians and gay men became a more visible presence in the SF community and as writers; notable gay authors included Joanna Russ, Thomas M. Disch and Samuel R. Delany.

Feminist SF authors imagined cultures in which homo- and bisexuality and a variety of gender models were the norm. Joanna Russ's The Female Man (1975) and the award-winning story "When It Changed", showing a female-only lesbian society that flourished without men, were enormously influential. Russ is largely responsible for introducing radical lesbian feminism into science fiction; she has stated that being openly lesbian was bad for her career and sales. Similar themes are explored in James Tiptree Jr.'s award-winning "Houston, Houston, Do You Read?"^{[d]}, which presents a female-only society after the extinction of men from disease. The society lacks stereotypically "male" problems such as war, but is stagnant. The women reproduce via cloning and consider men to be comical. Tiptree was a closeted bisexual woman writing secretly under a male pseudonym, and explored the sexual impulse as her main theme.

Other feminist utopias do not include lesbianism: Ursula K. Le Guin's The Left Hand of Darkness (1969) depicts trans-species sexuality, in which individuals are neither "male" nor "female" but can have both male and female sexual organs and reproductive abilities, making them in some senses bisexual. In The Language of the Night, a collection of Le Guin's criticism, she admits to having "quite unnecessarily locked the Gethenians into heterosexuality ... the omission [of the homosexual option] implies that sexuality is heterosexuality. I regret this very much." Le Guin often explores alternative sexuality in her works, and has subsequently written many stories that examine the possibilities SF allows for non-traditional homosexuality, such as the bisexual bonding between clones in "Nine Lives".^{[e]} Sexual themes and fluid genders also figure in the works of John Varley, who came to prominence in the 1970s. Many of his stories contain mentions of same-sex love and gay and lesbian characters. In his "Eight Worlds" suite of stories and novels, humanity has achieved the ability to change sex on a whim. Homophobia is shown to initially inhibit uptake of this technology, as in his story "Options", as it engenders drastic changes in relationships, with bisexuality eventually becoming the norm for society. His Gaea trilogy features lesbian protagonists, and almost all the characters are to some degree bisexual.

Samuel R. Delany was one of the first openly gay science fiction authors; in his earliest stories the gay sexual aspect appears as a "sensibility", rather than in overt sexual references. In some stories, such as Babel-17 (1966), same-sex love and same-sex intercourse are clearly implied but are given a kind of protective colouration because the protagonist is a woman who is involved in a three-person marriage with two men. The affection all three characters share for each other is in the forefront, and sexual activity between or among them is not directly described. In Dhalgren (1975), his most famous science fiction novel, Delany peoples his large canvas with characters of a wide variety of sexualities. Once again, sexual activity is not the focus of the novel although there are some of the first explicitly described scenes of gay sex in SF and Delany depicts characters with a wide variety of motivations and behaviours.

Delany's Nebula-winning short story "Aye, and Gomorrah" posits the development of neutered human astronauts and then depicts the people who become sexually oriented toward them. By imagining a new gender and resultant sexual orientation, the story allows readers to reflect on the real world while maintaining an estranging distance. Further award-winning stories featuring gay characters, such as "Time Considered as a Helix of Semi-Precious Stones", were to follow, all collected in Delany's short story retrospective Aye, and Gomorrah, and other stories. Delany faced censorship from book distribution companies for treatment of these topics. In later works, gay themes become increasingly central to Delany's works, attracting controversy, and some blur the line between science fiction and gay pornography. Delany's SF series Return to Neveryon was the first novel from a major US publisher to deal with the impact of AIDS, and he later won the William Whitehead Memorial Award for lifetime achievement in gay and lesbian writing. His most recent gay-themed novel is Through the Valley of the Nest of Spiders.

Reading over any large body of science fiction referring to gay men and women, one can't avoid seeing it as a system of stereotypes with a few more or less effective tries at a kind of fashionable liberalism

— Samuel Delany, "Introduction" in Uranian worlds.

Other big name SF authors approached LGBT themes in individual works: In Time Enough for Love (1973) by Robert A. Heinlein, the main character argues strongly for the future liberty of homosexual sex, but sex for the purpose of procreation remains held as the ideal. The female bisexuality in Stranger in a Strange Land (1961) has been described as mere titillation and male homosexuality in the same work was a "wrongness" deserving pity. Heinlein's use of sexuality is discussed in an essay entitled "The Embarrassments of Science Fiction" by SF writer Thomas Disch. Disch was publicly gay from 1968; this came out occasionally in his poetry and particularly in his novel On Wings of Song (1979). His other major SF novels also contained bisexual characters: in his mosaic novel 334, gay people are referred to as "republicans" in contrast to the straight "democrats". However, he did not try to write to a particular community: "I'm gay myself, but I don't write 'gay' literature."

Michael Moorcock was one of the first scifi authors to depict positive portrayals of homosexual, lesbian and bisexual relationships and sex in his novels. For example, in his 1965 novel, The Final Programme, most of the leading characters, including the central 'hero' Jerry Cornelius, engage in same sex relationships on multiple occasions and same sex relationships are depicted as entirely normal and without any moralising, negative consequences or gratuitous titillation, this is the case in the whole Jerry Cornelius series and in Moorcock's fiction generally (particularly in the Dancers at the End of Time series) sexuality is seen as polymorphic and fluid rather than based in fixed identities and gender roles.

Elizabeth Lynn is an openly lesbian science fiction and fantasy writer who has written numerous works featuring positive gay protagonists. Her Chronicles of Tornor novels (1979–80), the first of which won the World Fantasy Award, were among the first fantasy novels to have gay relationships as an unremarkable part of the cultural background, and included explicit and sympathetic depictions of same-sex love; the third novel is of particular lesbian interest. Her SF novel A Different Light (1978) featured a same-sex relationship between two men, and inspired the name of the LGBT bookstore and chain "A Different Light". The "magical lesbian tale" "The Woman Who Loved the Moon" also won a World Fantasy Award and is the title story in the Lynn's The Woman Who Loved the Moon, a collection also containing other gay speculative fiction stories.

=== Modern science fiction ===
Lesbians and gay men have become less alien in the world of SF in the last little while; we have, indeed, experienced a minor boom in the publishing of stories of 'alternative sexuality'. Despite this, we remain aliens within that world in many of the same ways that our characters are aliens within those stories.

— Wendy Pearson, Science Fiction Studies.

After the pushing back of boundaries in the 1960s and 1970s, homosexuality gained much wider tolerance, and was often incorporated into otherwise conventional SF stories with little comment. This was helped by the growing number of openly gay or lesbian authors, such as David Gerrold, Geoff Ryman, Nicola Griffith and Melissa Scott, and transgender writers such as Jessica Amanda Salmonson, an author who chronicled the progress of her gender change in the pages of The Literary Magazine of Fantasy and Terror. In the 1980s, blatant homophobia was no longer considered acceptable to most readers. However, depictions of unrealistic lesbians continue to propagate for the titillation of straight men in genre works. In the 1990s, stories depicting alternative sexualities experienced a resurgence.

Uranian Worlds, by Eric Garber and Lyn Paleo, was compiled in 1983 and is an authoritative guide to science fiction literature featuring gay, lesbian, transgender, and related themes. The book covers science fiction literature published before 1990 (2nd edition, 1990), providing a short review and commentary on each piece.

In Lois McMaster Bujold's Ethan of Athos (1986), the titular "unlikely hero" is gay obstetrician Dr. Ethan Urquhart of the single-gender world Athos, whose dangerous adventure alongside the first woman he has ever met presents both a future society where homosexuality is the norm and the lingering sexism and homophobia of our own world.

Cyberpunk, a genre arising in the mid-1980s, has been seen as heteronormative and masculine to a large extent, although feminist and "queer" interpretations are mooted by some critics. Melissa Scott, a lesbian writer, has written several cyberpunk works that prominently feature LGBT characters, including Lambda-award-winning Trouble and Her Friends (1994) and Shadow Man (1995), the latter having also been inducted into the Gaylactic Spectrum Hall of Fame. Scott has reported that reviewers called some of these works "too gay" for mixing cyberpunk clichés with political themes. Many of Scott's other SF works also contain LGBT themes; she said that she chooses to write about gay themes using SF because these genres allow her to explore situations in which LGBT people are treated better or worse than in reality, and that it also gives an estranging distance for readers averse to such themes, who might otherwise feel accused of similar discriminatory practices as those in the books.

A number of LGBT-themed anthologies of speculative short fiction have been published since the 1980s, the first being the science fiction-themed Kindred Spirits (1984), edited by Jeffrey M. Elliot. These anthologies often focus on particular sexual identities, such as the New Exploits of Lesbians series with titles in the fantasy (Magical lesbians, Fairy-tale lesbians) and horror (Twilight lesbians) areas. Others are grouped around particular genres, such as the award-winning Bending the Landscape series edited by Nicola Griffith and Stephen Pagel, in which each of the three volumes focus upon science fiction, fantasy or horror; or the horror-oriented Queer Fear anthologies, edited by Michael Rowe.

Gay characters became common enough that Diana Wynne Jones' The Tough Guide to Fantasyland contains an entry on gay mages as a fantasy cliché. Such characters are found in Mercedes Lackey's works, such as the Lambda award-winning The Last Herald Mage trilogy (1989), in which the protagonists are gay and have magical powers. Their relationships are an integral part of the story, which takes places in the fictional country of Valdemar. Much of the extended series provides non-heterosexual role-models for younger readers.

David Gerrold is an openly gay science fiction writer with a number of LGBT-themed works. The Man Who Folded Himself (1973) examines the narcissistic love of a time traveler who has gay orgies with alternate versions of himself, including female and lesbian versions. Gerrold's multi-award-winning Jumping Off the Planet (2000) is the first book in a young adult series, in which a father kidnaps his three sons and goes to the moon; one son is gay, and rejected from college as he is ineligible for a scholarship available to straight people who agree to have their sexual orientation changed to prevent overpopulation. Gerrold received a Nebula Award for a semi-autobiographical short story "The Martian Child" (1994), in which a gay man adopts a child. The story was later expanded to book length, and a feature film was produced in which the protagonist was straight, causing criticism.

Geoff Ryman wrote several award-winning novels and short stories that prominently feature LGBT characters: The protagonist of The Child Garden (1989), an outsider because of her resistance to genetic manipulation and her lesbianism, enters into a relationship with a similarly outcast lesbian polar bear. Lust (2001) follows a gay man who finds that his sexual fantasies are magically coming true. Was (1992) includes a gay actor with AIDS and a mentally challenged abused child, linked by their connection to The Wizard of Oz books and film. In a Locus magazine interview Ryman claimed that the gay and SF genre markets are incompatible:

In 1990, if you had asked me which was the worst thing to be labeled as, gay or an SF writer, I'd have said gay: kills you stone-dead in the market. Then Was came out.... They had it in the gay section of bookstores and they had stuff in gay magazines, but they didn't say SF — at which point I realized that being a science fiction writer is worse than being gay.

=== 21st century ===
The beginning of the 21st century saw a continual growth of speculative LGBT fiction. Some examples are given below:

Larissa Lai's novel Salt Fish Girl (2002) depicts lesbian relationships in the context of a dystopian corporate future. The novel features Asian-Canadian characters in these lesbian relationships, incorporating racial and ethnic identity into a queer understanding of speculative fiction. Salt Fish Girl engages queer ideas in regards to procreation and bodies, as characters are able to give birth without sperm by eating the durian fruit. It was shortlisted for the James Tiptree Jr. Award in 2002.

Elizabeth Bear's Carnival (2006) revisits the trope of the single-gender world, as a pair of gay male ambassador-spies attempt to infiltrate and subvert the predominately lesbian civilization of New Amazonia, whose matriarchal rulers have all but enslaved their men. Sarah Hall's dystopian novel The Carhullan Army (2007), published in the US under the title Daughters of the North, matter-of-factly features lesbians as primary characters. The novel won the 2007 John Llewellyn Rhys Prize and James Tiptree, Jr. Award, and was shortlisted for the 2008 Arthur C. Clarke Award. It is perhaps telling of the evolution of public perception of same-sex relationships that the relationships are unmentioned or only peripherally noted in reviews.

Rafael Grugman's dystopian novel Nontraditional Love (2008) describes an inverted world in which mixed-sex marriages are forbidden and conception occurs in test tubes. In lesbian families, one of the women carries the child while gay male couples turn to surrogate mothers to bring their children to term. The Netherlands is the only country where mixed-sex marriages are permitted. In this world intimacy between the opposite sexes is rejected, world history and the classics of world literature have been falsified in order to support the ideology of the homosexual world. The author paints a grotesque situation, but underlying this story is the idea that society should be tolerant and accepting and respect the right of every person to be themselves.

Reviewing the field of lesbian romance speculative fiction in 2012, Liz Bourke concluded that it remained a niche subgenre of uneven quality, but mentioned Jane Fletcher, Chris Anne Wolfe, Barbara Ann Wright, Sandra Barret and Ruth Diaz as contributors of note. More recently in Rick Riordan's 2013 teen fantasy novel The House of Hades, character Nico di Angelo professes romantic feelings for protagonist Percy Jackson. In terms of gender identity, Kim Stanley Robinson's 2012 novel 2312 depicts a world of fluid gender, where "self-images for gender" include feminine, masculine, androgynous, gyandromorphous, hermaphrodite, ambisexual, bisexual, intersex, neuter, eunuch, nonsexual, undifferentiated, gay, lesbian, queer, invert, homosexual, polymorphous, poly, labile, berdache, hijra, and two-spirit. In 2013, Natasja Hellenthal's lesbian fantasy debut novel The Queen's Curse became an Amazon bestseller, and in her The Comyenti Series the main female character is bisexual and falls in love with a lesbian character. The comyentis are a supernatural/paranormal bisexual species.

Ellen Kushner's mannerpunk Swordspoint series of novels feature homosexual and bisexual protagonists in the 18th century fantasy world of Riverside. It spawned Swordspoint: Tremontaine, a thirteen-part "Fantasy of Manners" written by a variety of authors. The audiobooks of Swordspoint won the 2013 Audie Award for Best Audio Drama, the Earphones Award from AudioFile Magazine, and the 2013 Communicator Award: Gold Award of Excellence (Audio). The Swordspoint sequel The Fall of the Kings, written with Kushner's wife Delia Sherman, won the 2014 Wilbur Award.

Within the realm of tie-in speculative fiction, there was also an increase in LGBT representation. In particular, from 2001 onwards there was a concerted effort to explore this in licensed Star Trek literature. In the Star Trek: Deep Space Nine relaunch, the post-series novels following the end of the eponymous television series, a passing line in one series to a certain species, the Andorians, marrying in fours allowed the exploration of a quatri-gendered species, who partnered in broadly two 'male' and two 'female' species. Andrew J. Robinson's Garak novel, A Stitch in Time, suggested the omnisexuality of his character, which was followed up in subsequent novels, in particular Una McCormack's 2014 novel, The Crimson Shadow. In the original series Star Trek: Vanguard, created by Marco Palmieri and David Alan Mack, two of the main characters were a lesbian Vulcan officer and a lesbian Klingon intelligence agent.

Sarah Waters is a Welsh author popular for lesbian romances in historical times, most often the Victorian Era. Popular works of hers include Tipping the Velvet (1998) and Fingersmith (2002).

== Comics and manga ==
For much of the 20th century, gay relationships were discouraged from being shown in comics which were seen mainly as directed towards children. Until 1989, the Comics Code Authority (CCA), which imposed de facto censorship on comics sold through news stands in the United States, forbade any suggestion of homosexuality. Artists had to drop subtle hints while not stating directly a character's orientation. Overt gay and lesbian themes were first found in underground and alternative titles which did not carry the CCA's seal of approval.

The CCA came into being in response to Fredric Wertham's Seduction of the Innocent, in which comic book creators were accused of attempting to negatively influence children with images of violence and sexuality, including subliminal homosexuality. Wertham claimed Wonder Woman's strength and independence made her a lesbian, and stated that "The Batman type of story may stimulate children to homosexual fantasies."

In recent years the number of LGBT characters has increased greatly in mainstream superhero comics; however, LGBT characters continue to be relegated to supporting roles, and generate criticism for the treatment gay characters receive.

=== Marvel ===
Alpha Flight's Northstar was the first major gay character in the Marvel universe and remains the most famous gay character in mainstream comics. Created by Marvel Comics in 1979 as a member of the original Alpha Flight superhero team, Northstar's sexual identity was hinted at early in his history, in 1983 in issues 7 and 8 of Alpha Flight, but not openly stated; his apparent lack of interest in women was chalked up to his obsessive drive to win as a ski champion. The character was finally revealed to be gay in 1992's Alpha Flight issue 106 and his outing made national headlines.

In 2002, Marvel Comics revived The Rawhide Kid in their Marvel MAX imprint, introducing the first openly gay comic book character to star in his own magazine. The first edition of the Rawhide Kid's gay saga was called Slap Leather. According to a CNN.com article, the character's sexuality is conveyed indirectly, through euphemisms and puns, and the comic's style is campy. Conservative groups quickly protested the gay take on the character and claimed that children would be corrupted by it, and the covers carried an "Adults only" label.

Marvel's policy had stated that all series emphasizing solo gay characters must carry an "Adults only" label, in response to conservative protests. But in 2006, Marvel editor-in-chief Joe Quesada claimed that this policy was no longer in force, and Marvel received GLAAD's 2005 Best Comic Book Award for its superhero comic book Young Avengers, which included gay characters but was published as a mainstream book with no warning label. In 2012, despite protests, Marvel published an issue of Astonishing X-Men in which Northstar married his partner, Kyle.

=== DC ===
DC often still draws criticism for its use of stereotypes for LGBT characters. Firebrand, a superhero debuting in 1941, is thought by some to be an early example, with his pink or transparent costume. Writer Roy Thomas penned thought balloons that suggested Firebrand had been involved in a gay relationship with his sidekick and bodyguard Slugger Dunn, although these hints never moved beyond subtext. A more modern example is the violent vigilante superhero Midnighter. The Batman-like Midnighter was shown as being in a relationship with the Superman-like Apollo during their time as members of the superhero team The Authority. Midnighter and Apollo are now married and have an adopted daughter – Midnighter has gone on to star in his own title. In 2006, DC Comics could still draw widespread media attention by announcing a new, lesbian incarnation of the well-known character Batwoman, even though openly lesbian minor characters such as Gotham City police officer Renee Montoya already existed in the franchise.

Bruce Wayne and Dick Grayson. Panel from Batman No. 84 (June 1954), page 24.

In addition to true LGBT characters, there has been controversy over various homosexual interpretations of the most famous superhero comic book characters. Batman's relationship with Robin has famously come under scrutiny, in spite of the majority of creators associated with the creator denying that the character is gay. Psychologist Fredric Wertham, who in Seduction of the Innocent asserted that "Batman stories are psychologically homosexual", claimed to find a "subtle atmosphere of homoeroticism which pervades the adventures of the mature 'Batman' and his young friend 'Robin'". It has also been claimed that Batman is interesting to gay audiences because "he was one of the first fictional characters to be attacked on the grounds of his presumed homosexuality," and "the 1960s TV series remains a touchstone of camp." Frank Miller has described the relationship between Batman and the Joker as a "homophobic nightmare"; he views the character as sublimating his sexual urges into crime fighting.

Some continue to play off the homosexual interpretations of Batman. One notable example occurred in 2000, when DC Comics refused to allow permission for the reprinting of four panels (from Batman #79, 92, 105 and 139) to illustrate Christopher York's paper All in the Family: Homophobia and Batman Comics in the 1950s. Another happened in the summer of 2005, when painter Mark Chamberlain displayed a number of watercolors depicting both Batman and Robin in suggestive and sexually explicit poses. DC threatened both artist and the Kathleen Cullen Fine Arts gallery with legal action if they did not cease selling the works and demanded all remaining art, as well as any profits derived from them.

Many of DC's gay characters, such as Obsidian and Renee Montoya, were changed or essentially erased in The New 52 reboot of 2011. Meanwhile, others, such as Kate Kane, were given far less attention than before the reboot. In 2012 DC announced that an "iconic" character would now be gay in the new DC universe. It was then revealed that Alan Scott, the original Green Lantern, was that character. This led to fan outcry because his status as "iconic" is debatable, and he does not actually exist in the mainstream DC universe. This also effectively meant that the already gay character, Obsidian, could not exist as he was Alan Scott's child.

=== Manga ===
Yaoi and yuri (also known as Boys' Love and Girls' Love, respectively) are Japanese genres which have homosexual romance themes, across a variety of media. Yaoi and yuri have spread beyond Japan: both translated and original yaoi and yuri is now available in many countries and languages. The characters of yaoi and yuri do not tend to self-identify as homosexual or bisexual. As with much manga and anime, SF and fantasy tropes and environments are common: For example, Ai no Kusabi, a 1980s yaoi light novel series described as a "magnum opus" of the Boys Love genre, involves a science fictional caste system. Simoun has been described as being "a wonderful sci fi series" which does not have to rely on its yuri content to appeal to the audience.

Yaoi has been criticised for stereotypical and homophobic portrayals of its characters, and failing to address gay issues. Homophobia, when it is presented as an issue at all, is used as a plot device to "heighten the drama", or to show the purity of the leads' love. Rachel Thorn has suggested that as BL is a romance narrative, having strong political themes may be a "turn off" to the readers. Critics state that the genre challenges heteronormativity via the "queer" bishōnen.

There is also a style of manga called Bara, which is typically written by gay men for a gay male adult audience. Bara often has more realistic themes than yaoi and is more likely to acknowledge homophobia and the taboo nature of homosexuality in Japan. While western commentators sometimes group bara and yaoi together, writers and fans consider them separate genres.

== Film and television ==
In general, speculative fiction on television and film has historically lagged behind literature in its portrayals of homosexuality. While science fiction and fantasy novels from the mid-twentieth century onward increasingly experimented with diverse sexual identities and orientations, visual media such as film and television were slower to reflect such changes. This delay was influenced by a combination of factors, including censorship laws, conservative broadcasting standards, and the perception that mass audiences would be less accepting of non-heterosexual narratives.

As a result, sexual relationships in major speculative fiction franchises have been overwhelmingly depicted as heterosexual, often presented in the form of traditional romantic subplots that reinforced dominant cultural norms. Inter-species and inter-ethnic relationships, on the other hand, became far more common tropes, particularly in works that sought to explore themes of cultural integration, diplomacy, or the “otherness” of alien societies. Despite the creative freedom of speculative worlds, homosexuality and gender variance were often omitted, sidelined, or presented only through allegory rather than direct representation.

When queer characters did appear, they were typically relegated to minor roles, coded subtext, or storylines that emphasized their difference as a source of conflict rather than normalization. Explicitly transgender or gender-fluid characters were even rarer, and when depicted, they were often associated with villainy, deception, or alienness, rather than genuine representation of human diversity. Only toward the late twentieth and early twenty-first centuries did mainstream speculative fiction on screen begin to include more visible lesbian, gay, bisexual, and transgender characters, though progress remained uneven across different franchises and markets

=== Film ===
LGBT characters in films began to appear more regularly only in the 1980s. Films in the late 1920s and early 1930s reflected the liberal attitudes of the day and could include sexual innuendos and references to homosexuality, but from the 1930s until 1968 the film industry in the US followed the Production Code. The code spelled out what was morally acceptable for a public audience; references to sexual "perversions" such as homosexuality were forbidden. Virtually all motion pictures produced in the United States adhered to the code, and similar censorship was common in other countries, for example an early version of the first lesbian vampire film Dracula's Daughter, a film described by Vito Russo in The Celluloid Closet as presenting "homosexuality as a predatory weakness", was rejected by the British Board of Film Censors in 1935, who said in part "...Dracula's Daughter would require half a dozen ... languages to adequately express its beastliness.". Horror author Anne Rice has named Dracula's Daughter as a direct inspiration for her own homoerotic vampire fiction, naming a bar in her novel Queen of the Damned "Dracula's Daughter" in honor of the film. Films produced under such censorship could only introduce homosexuality as a disguised undercurrent, and still flirted with controversy in doing so, such as in the cult horror film White Zombie.

The less stringent rules of the post-Hayes film industry allowed sexuality to be more open, and cinema as a whole became more sexually explicit from the 1980s in particular, but aimed to purely to entertain rather than exploring underlying sexual dynamics. Much of the sex in speculative fiction film is merely intended to titillate; a review of fantasy films identified 10–15% as softcore pornography. but it remained rare to see gay characters in speculative fiction films. Horror films, that had sex as one of their major preoccupations, continued to be more leniently censored, due to the perception of being unserious and lightweight. Vampires in particular have been described as obvious erotic metaphors and as a result, numerous vampire films since the 1970s strongly imply or explicitly show lesbianism, following the inspiration of lesbian vampire story Carmilla. The prototypical Hollywood vampire, Dracula, was shown to be openly gay in the spoof film Does Dracula Suck? in 1969.

Gay genre films remain rare, and science fiction films' inclusion of gay characters continues to relegate them to supporting roles, such as the "stereotypical, limp-wristed, frantic homosexual" minor character played by Harvey Fierstein in the 1996 blockbuster Independence Day, a film whose main theme has been described as being the anxiety surrounding male friendships and homosexual panic. It is also interesting to note that the film's director, Roland Emmerich, is openly gay. Still there are some curious cases like Cthulhu (2007) a horror/thriller film based on the works of H. P. Lovecraft, in which the main character is gay but his homosexuality is not the main aspect of the character, although it is important in the development of the character's psychology. The film is plagued with monsters and disturbing happenings. Also, in V for Vendetta there are two secondary characters – one gay, one lesbian – shown as victims of the totalitarian dystopia. 2012 saw the light of the Wachowskis + Tom Tykwer blockbuster, Cloud Atlas, featuring in one of the six stories a couple of gay characters.

=== Television ===
LGBT characters began appearing on television with increasing frequency only in the 1990s. The 1994 television science fiction show Babylon 5 introduced a bisexual character, Susan Ivanova, whose relationship with a fellow female telepath was revealed in season 2 (1995). The Advocate called this relationship out as the closest that the Star Trek franchise or any "Star Trek clone", as he called the show, had come to a "gay creature—much less a gay human being." Babylon 5 continued to explore the state of same-sex relationships in the future with the introduction of a male-male marriage and subsequent honeymoon as cover for two of the main characters who were on a covert mission to a Mars colony in season 4.

The Xena: Warrior Princess fantasy television series introduced its main characters, Xena and Gabrielle, as close companions; fan speculation about lesbian overtones led to them becoming lesbian icons, although the lesbian content remained at the subtext level. The series has been cited as "trail-blazing" and breaking down barriers, allowing the production of subsequent programming such as Buffy the Vampire Slayer, which introduced a number of LGBT characters. The most famous is the major character, Willow and her partners Tara and Kennedy. Although praised for their "healthy relationship" and being the first lesbian relationship between major characters on prime-time television, others criticised the use of witchcraft as a metaphor for lesbian sex. Tara's death directly after reconciliatory sex with Willow caused an outcry among the LGBT community, who saw it as a "homophobic cliché". Andrew Wells, a recurring villain and eventual ally, was strongly implied to be gay, although closeted. The series was influential on subsequent television speculative fiction, including Torchwood. The series won a number of LGBT themed awards, and was regarded as groundbreaking in its portrayal of gay youth.

Torchwood is a British science fiction drama television programme, part of the long-running Doctor Who franchise, which began airing in 2006 on BBC Three. The series explores several themes in its narrative, in particular LGBTQ themes. Various characters are portrayed as sexually fluid; through those characters, the series examines homosexual and bisexual relationships. Although the nature of their sexual flexibility is not explicitly discussed, the characters offer varying perspectives on orientation, Series creator Russell T Davies said that he hoped to defy audience expectations of monosexual characters: "Without making it political or dull, this is going to be a very bisexual programme. I want to knock down the barriers so we can't define which of the characters is gay. We need to start mixing things up, rather than thinking, 'This is a gay character and he'll only ever go off with men.'" Davies has also described Jack Harkness as omnisexual: "He'll shag anything with a hole. Jack doesn't categorise people: if he fancies you, he'll do it with you."

The inclusion of significant LGBT characters in modern speculative fiction television series has not been universal. For example, the Star Trek franchise's lack of same-sex relationships has long been a sore spot with LGBT fandom, some of whom have organised boycotts against the franchise to protest its failure to include LGBT characters. They also point out that Gene Roddenberry had made statements in later life favourable to acceptance of homosexuality and the portrayal of same-sex relationships in Star Trek, but that the franchise's coverage has remained meagre.

Within the Star Trek canon, there had been little LGBT representation until Star Trek: Discovery in 2017. The International Review of Science Fiction ran a feature entitled "Prisoners of Dogma and Prejudice: Why There Are no G/L/B/T Characters in Star Trek: Deep Space 9". However, gender identity has occasionally been treated as an "issue" within the new Star Trek series, to be dealt with as a theme in individual episodes, such as the 1995 Star Trek: Deep Space Nine episode "Rejoined", which was the first episode of the show to feature a same-sex relationship and romantic same-sex kiss between women. Subsequently, the Star Trek franchise has portrayed a few same-sex kisses, but always in the context of either the evil "mirror universe" ("The Emperor's New Cloak") or body possession ("Warlord" and others). In a 2000 Fandom interview, Star Trek screenwriter Ronald D. Moore suggested that the reason why no gay characters existed in the television franchise was because someone wanted it that way, and no amount of support from fans, cast or crew was going to make any difference. In recent years, a few of the Star Trek novels and comics, which are officially licensed but not considered canon, have featured serious direct same-sex relationships, including portraying a minor canon character as gay.

In 2005 the television series Dante's Cove premiered on the here! cable station. The series included both gay and lesbian couples dealing with supernatural situations in the coastal town of the same name. The following year, Syfy premiered the series Eureka. The series spotlighted a fictional town in Oregon that consisted almost entirely of geniuses. This included the town's café owner Vincent, who also happened to be gay.

HBO brought then new series True Blood to the forefront of gay genre television, introducing a variety of omnisexual characters to the small screen in 2008 including: Lafayette Reynolds (played by Nelsan Ellis), Jesus Velasquez (played by Kevin Alejandro), Tara Thornton (played by Rutina Wesley), Pam Swynford De Beaufort (played by Kristin Bauer van Straten), Eddie Gauthier (played by Stephen Root), Russell Edgington (played by Denis O'Hare), and Rev. Steve Newlin (played by Michael McMillian).

Stargate Universe in 2009 became the first space-based science fiction show to feature an openly gay character in its primary cast, which was "Camille Wray" played by Ming-Na. Wray was also the first gay character in the franchise and the first primary lesbian Asian-American character on primetime television. Wray's storyline featured a committed long-term relationship with her Earth-bound partner Sharon (played by Reiko Aylesworth), the lifelike portrayal of which was very positively received by the lesbian community and press. Stargate Universe was cancelled after a two-season run.

In 2009 the series Warehouse 13 premiered on the Syfy cable network. The series later introduced a character named Steve Jinks, played by actor Aaron Ashmore, a gay government agent assigned to assist in the containment of bizarre artifacts.

In 2010 a cable series prequel to Battlestar Galactica was introduced titled Caprica. The series highlighted a world in which same-sex marriage was common. One of the central characters named Sam Adama, played by Sasha Roiz, had a husband named Larry, played by Julius Chapple.

In 2011 the cable station Syfy premiered the series Being Human, an Americanized version of the previously released British series of the same name. A lesbian character named Emily Levison, played by actress Alison Louder, was introduced as the sister to one of the main characters. That same year, the FX cable series American Horror Story highlighted gay ghost couple Chad Warwick and Patrick, played by Zachary Quinto and Teddy Sears. The HBO cable station premiered Game of Thrones, based on the book series of the same name. The series included gay couple Renly Baratheon and Loras Tyrell, played by actors Gethin Anthony and Finn Jones. MTV also premiered the cable series Teen Wolf that same year. One of the characters depicted is an out gay high school lacrosse player named Danny Mahealani, played by Keahu Kahuanui.

The Expanse series introduced a variety of LGBTQ characters, starting with UN Ambassador Frank Degraaf and his husband Craig Degraaf and later a lesbian couple, Anna and Nono Volovodov. The series, adapted from a series of novels of the same name, is also notable for its depiction of polyamorous relationships which became a common practice in the setting as a result of societal, economic, and environmental factors. In the episodes "Windmills" and "New Terra", the Expanse introduces James Holden's eight parents from Montana, five men and three women who formed a plural marital union as a way to leverage strict UN laws governing land ownership and reproduction and tax benefits. In season 5, it is revealed that Camina Drummer is part of a polyamorous wedding with her crew, with her actress, Cara Gee, describing it as the beginning of a "love relationship...[with] a polyamorous, beautiful, queer family" and says she was thrilled to represent that in the show.

=== Slash fiction ===
The platonic close male relationships in television and film science fiction have been reinterpreted by fans as slash fiction – Kirk/Spock being the earliest example. Slash cannot be commercially distributed due to copyright, and until the 1990s was either undistributed or published in zines. With the advent of the internet, the slash fiction community of fans and writers began to cluster at sites such as FanFiction.Net, and websites and fanzines dedicated to popular speculative fiction franchises such as X-files and Star Trek have become common. The use of characters from major SF franchises in "gay readings" has caused legal action: LucasFilm has sent cease and desist orders to prevent gay reinterpretations of Star Wars characters, and Anne Rice is notorious for attempts to stop production of slash fiction based on her Vampire Chronicles characters, although many of the characters are bisexual in canon. Slash fiction has been described as important to the LGBT community and the formation of queer identities, as it represents a resistance to the expectation of compulsory heterosexuality, but has also been noted as being unrepresentative of the gay community, being more a medium to express feminist dissatisfactions with SF. According to polls, most of slash fandom is made up of heterosexual women with a college degree. These demographics are older than the yaoi fans and they tend to be more easily disturbed about slash depicting underage sexuality, but this is becoming less true due to the popularity of Harry Potter-inspired slash fiction.

Femslash is a subgenre of slash fiction which focuses on romantic and/or sexual relationships between female fictional characters, Typically, characters featured in femslash are heterosexual in the canon universe; however, similar fan fiction about lesbian characters are commonly labeled as femslash for convenience. There is less femslash than there is slash based on male couples – it has been suggested that heterosexual female slash authors generally do not write femslash, and that it is rare to find a fandom with two sufficiently engaging female characters. Janeway/Seven is the main Star Trek femslash pairing, as only they have "an on-screen relationship fraught with deep emotional connection and conflict". There is debate about whether fanfiction about canon lesbians such as Willow and Tara of Buffy the Vampire Slayer counts as "slash", their relationship storylines are more coy than heterosexual ones, which entices Willow/Tara femslash authors to fill in the gaps in the known relationship storyline. It is "relatively recently" that male writers have begun writing femslash.

== Reaction of the speculative fiction community ==
There has been a long history of tolerance of LGBT people in SF fandom. The presence of gay members was noted by attendees of early conventions, but generally not discussed — the idea that gay or lesbian members would seek recognition within the SF community was "unthinkable," and an accusation in the 1940s by a fanzine editor that the Los Angeles Science Fiction Association was "full of gay members" caused a scandal in fan circles. Prominent SF fan Forrest Ackerman is regarded as one of the first members of fandom to openly support the gay and lesbian movements. He was known for writing early lesbian fiction and aided in the publication of The Ladder, the journal of the recently formed lesbian group the Daughters of Bilitis. He claims the group named him an honorary lesbian for his support, and to have pseudonymously written the earliest work of "lesbian SF" in 1947 in Vice Versa, the lesbian fanzine edited by Lisa Ben.

As the number of works featuring LGBT characters increased, so did the visibility of LGBT fans. At least as early as the 1980 Worldcon (Noreascon Two), there were gatherings of gay and gay-friendly members of the SF community, including Samuel R. Delany, Marion Zimmer Bradley and Melissa Scott. However, such meetings did not necessarily indicate whole-hearted acceptance within the fan community, and gay and lesbian fans were not regarded as a unified interest group. Informal gatherings at conferences and the attempted creation of a newsletter for LGBT fans drew little notice.

Networking between gay fans continued, finally coalescing at the 1986 Worldcon into a plan of action. This led to the first Gaylaxicon science fiction convention being held in 1988 and subsequently to the creation of the Gaylactic Network and the Gaylactic Spectrum Awards by the science fiction community. Gay-themed discussions are now a staple at conventions such as WisCon; for example, WisCon 30 featured a panel discussing "Why Women Write About Gay Men", and the 38th World Science Fiction Convention in Boston had a discussion panel entitled "The Closed Open Mind – Homophobia in Science Fiction and Fantasy Stories".

Other SF authors, such as Orson Scott Card, have been criticised by the LGBT community for their works or opinions, which have been described as homophobic.

Some lesbian science fiction is targeted specifically to a lesbian audience, rather than science fiction fans, and published by small feminist or lesbian fiction presses such as Bella Books, Bold Strokes Books, Ylva Publishing, Regal Crest Enterprises, Bedazzled Ink, Intaglio Publications, and Spinsters Ink. A notable author writing science fiction published by lesbian presses is Katherine V. Forrest.

== LGBT speculative fiction awards ==
A number of awards exist that recognise works at the intersection of LGBT and speculative fiction:

- The Gaylactic Spectrum Awards honour works in science fiction, fantasy and horror which include positive explorations of gay, lesbian, bisexual or transgender characters, themes, or issues. The awards were instituted in 1999 and are given for best novel, short fiction and other works of the previous year. Works produced before the awards' inception are eligible for entry into the Hall of Fame.
- The Lambda Literary Awards include awards for science fiction, fantasy and horror. The awards were first presented in 1989, with separate categories for speculative fiction for lesbians and gay men. In 1993 these categories were merged and the combined award has undergone several name changes since then. Although the awards are given based on the quality of the writing and the LGBT themes, the author's sexual orientation is also a factor.
- The Otherwise Award (formerly the James Tiptree, Jr. Award) honours works of science fiction or fantasy that expand or explore one's understanding of gender. Thus, it often goes to works which deal directly or tangentially with gay, lesbian, bisexual or transgender issues.
- Golden Crown Literary Society Awards (or "Goldies") are given to works containing lesbian themes or depictions of lesbian characters. Awards are given in numerous categories, including speculative fiction (or "SciFi/Fantasy/Horror") and paranormal romance.

== See also ==
- Sex and sexuality in speculative fiction
- Gender in speculative fiction
- LGBTQ literature
- List of LGBT-themed speculative fiction
- List of LGBT figures in mythology
- Single-gender worlds
- LGBTQ themes in Western animation

== Footnotes ==
^{a} SF is used throughout as an abbreviation for speculative fiction, for convenience. Science fiction and slash fiction are written in full when referred to specifically.
^{b} Collected in In a Glass Darkly.
^{c} Collected in A Saucer of Loneliness.
^{d} Collected in Her Smoke Rose Up Forever.
^{e} Collected in The Wind's Twelve Quarters.
