= There's a Hole in the City =

2005 short story by Richard Bowes

- Short story by Richard Bowes
- Country: United States
- Language: English
- Genres: fantasy, horror

Publication
- Published in: Sci Fiction
- Publication type: Periodical
- Publisher: Syfy
- Media type: Online (magazine)
- Publication date: June 15, 2005

"There's a Hole in the City" is a 2005 speculative fiction short story by Richard Bowes that describes the September 11th attacks alongside the "summoned ghosts from past disasters" in New York City. Originally published in the online magazine Sci Fiction, the story has been reprinted multiple times in various anthologies and won both the Million Writers Award and the International Horror Guild Award. It was also a finalist for the Nebula Award for Best Short Story. The story has been called "the single best piece of fiction" about the experience and aftermath of the 9/11 attacks and has been analyzed in critical examinations of fiction related to New York.

== Background ==
Bowes lived most of his life in New York City and was called "the consummate New Yorker" by Jeffrey Ford. He also personally witnessed the 9/11 attacks, later stating that he was "present at the Stonewall Riots in 1969 and watched the World Trade Center towers fall from the end of my block on 9/11."

== Plot ==
"There's a Hole in the City" opens with the narrator, a long-time New Yorker, describing his life in Greenwich Village during the days following 9/11 and dealing with the trauma and grief experienced by both himself and the entire city. His friend Mags reveals to him that the attacks opened up a hole in the city through which ghosts are returning to Manhattan. In addition to victims of the recent attacks, the ghosts that appear are also from previous New York City tragedies such as 1911's Triangle Shirtwaist Factory fire and 1904's burning of the General Slocum steamship. Mags has also seen the ghost of a mutual friend who died in the city from suicide while addicted to drugs. At first the narrator dismisses all this, believing Mags has post-traumatic stress disorder. However, he later witnesses Mags walking with their friend's ghost into the city's gaping "hole" at ground zero.

== Publication ==
"There's a Hole in the City" was originally selected by editor Ellen Datlow for publication in Sci Fiction, an online magazine published by Syfy. Published in June 2005, the story was one of the final works released by Sci Fiction before Syfy shut down the magazine later that year.

Following the story's original publication, it was reprinted in multiple anthologies including Horror: The Best of the Year, Fantasy: The Very Best of 2005, Ghosts: Recent Hauntings and In the Shadow of the Towers: Speculative Fiction in a Post-9/11 World. The story has also been translated and reprinted in other languages, including in Japan's S-F Magazine.

The story was later published as the first chapter of Bowes' fictionalized memoir Dust Devil on a Quiet Street, released in 2013 by Lethe Press. In addition, a recording of Bowes narrating the story is broadcast around 9/11 each year on WBAI in New York City.

== Awards ==
"There's a Hole in the City" won the 2006 storySouth Million Writers Award and the International Horror Guild Award for Best Short Form. The story was also a finalist for the 2006 Nebula Award for Best Short Story and the Gaylactic Spectrum Award for Best Short Fiction.

Bowes' 2013 fictionalized memoir Dust Devil on a Quiet Street, which includes the story as the first chapter, was also named a finalist for the World Fantasy and Lambda Awards.

== Critical reception ==
Author Matthew Kressel called the story "the single best piece of fiction I've read about the experience and aftermath of the September 11 attacks, working as both a memoir of what he lived through and a heartbreaking ghost story." Joshua Rothman in The New Yorker called "There's a Hole in the City" an "elegant and beautiful ghost story ... (that) evokes the autumn of 2001 with solemn specificity." Rothman added that "the story puts 9/11 in the context of New York's long municipal history of death and grief, and literalizes the haunted feeling one has near Ground Zero."

Matthew Cheney called the story "complex, even enigmatic, without being baffling" while Jamie Todd Rubin said the story "touches sensitive nerves" but "there is a surrealism that moves through the story, something that echoes Harlan Ellison's morose 'On the Downhill Side.'" And Publishers Weekly described the story as "a haunting tale of the supernatural (that) captures the desolation and desperation of downtown Manhattan in the immediate aftermath of 9/11."

Bowes' fictionalized memoir Dust Devil on a Quiet Street, which contained the story, was also praised. Publishers Weekly said the book depicted "a New York at once beautiful and terrible, dangerous and glorious, where mundane life is only one step away from the supernatural."

== Critical analysis ==
Bowes' stories, which have been described by The Encyclopedia of Science Fiction as reading like "highly sophisticated Urban Fantasy", frequently feature New York City as a setting. As Jeffrey Ford has noted, "New York's presence is not ostentatious in his fiction, but it takes the form of a character, and is always there, interacting with the human characters."

In New York: A Literary History, critic Birgit Däwes states that "There's a Hole in the City", when compared to other fiction about 9/11, "evokes a deeper layer of absence: the traces of history and/or possibility, of past and present realities that are inextricably tied to contemporary New York City; the fiction underneath historiography, lying just beneath the visible, empirical surface, accessible — as this story manifests — through ghosts as a form of memory and transcendence."

In Liminality and the City in Contemporary New York Fiction, Alina Stocklövm says the story "explores the liminality of the city's existence, where past and present tragedies converge, and individuals grapple with the challenging process of healing and resilience in the face of collective trauma." Stocklövm notes that Bowes' story specifically addresses not only the "void left behind by the fall of the Twin Towers" but also the heartache of living in New York after September 11, 2001," including the "physical and mental pain, hopelessness, confusion, and disbelief."

Stocklövm adds that all of this is "enhanced by the historical void" introduced by Bowes:

There appears to be a hole in the city's timeline, as victims from other eras begin to pass through the modern-day chaos. This concept underscores the ambiguous nature of the connecting quality inherent in the hole: in times when New Yorkers fear to lose connection to the city and each other, they also feel more connected than ever, through the act of grieving together. The fact that the hole actually functions as a connective tissue between people is strongly expressed in the last passage of the story, when the narrator describes seeing his dead friend Mag: "Another figure, thin, pale, in a suede jacket and bell-bottom pants. He held out his bloody hands, and together they walked through the smoke and flames into the hole in the city." This passage suggests that in a liminal space between life and death and between past and future, New Yorkers become united in a collective sense of trauma and pain.

In Douglas Lain's anthology In the Shadow of the Towers: Speculative Fiction in a Post-9/11 World, he describes the story as actually being "realistic fiction" that "turns our attention to the past, so that what we've perceived before as a chain of separate events events can be truly seen, to quote Walter Benjamin, as 'one single catastrophe which keeps piling wreckage upon wreckage.'" Benjamin's words come from his essay "Theses on the Philosophy of History", where he is discussing the Angelus Novus painting.
