= From the Files of the Time Rangers =

2005 novel by Richard Bowes

- first edition cover
- Author: Richard Bowes
- Cover artist: John Picacio
- Language: English
- Genre: Science fantasy
- Publisher: Golden Gryphon Press (US)
- Publication date: September 1, 2005
- Publication place: United States
- Media type: Print (hardcover)
- Pages: 272 pp
- ISBN: 978-1-930846-35-7

From the Files of the Time Rangers is a fix-up novel by Richard Bowes dealing with time travel and alternative history. Its foreword, "Rick Bowes: An Appreciation", is by Kage Baker, author of The Company novels. The novel was edited by Marty Halpern for Golden Gryphon Press. Several of the individual sections had previously published in shorter, albeit different, form.

The novel was nominated for the 2007 Nebula Award for Best Novel.

== Summary ==
Greek gods are posing as humans and pulling humanity's strings in this mosaic novel about time travel, alternate worlds, and the making of a president. The Time Rangers, Apollo's chosen servants, are in charge of preserving the peace and harmony along the Time Stream, the pathway between various worlds and times.

But Apollo has given the Rangers a new task: to protect Timothy Garde Macauley, the chosen one, who must become the president of the United States to avoid the destruction of humankind.

Standing in the Rangers' way are other gods: Mercury, who's working his wiles in the world of public relations; Diana, cruising New York City in the guise of an NYPD detective; Pluto, who is in the process of grooming his successor; and Dionysus, who has caused the annihilation of an alternate world.

== Contents ==
- "Rick Bowes: An Appreciation" by Kage Baker
- From the Files of the Time Rangers
  - Part One: The Ferryman's Wife
  - Part Two: The Young Macauley
  - Part Three: The Return of the Pretender
- "Afterword: The Mosaic Novel" by Richard Bowes

== See also ==
- Myth-o-Mania - children's book series depicting modern twists on Greek mythology
- Percy Jackson & the Olympians - also depicting Greek gods active in present-day America
