= Sci Fiction =

Online magazine

- Website type: Online Magazine
- Owner: scifi.com
- Creator: Ellen Datlow
- Website: scifi.com/scifiction/
- Commercial: Yes
- Launched: May 2000
- Current status: Defunct (since 2005)

Sci Fiction was a Hugo Award winning digital publication that ran from 2000 to 2005, during which time it was the leading online science fiction magazine. Published by Syfy (then called the Sci-Fi Channel) and edited by Ellen Datlow, fiction from the magazine won multiple awards including the very first Nebula Award presented to an online-published story. Sci Fiction helped raise the overall status of online-published fiction and has been said to have achieved for online magazines what Astounding Magazine did six decades earlier for print SF magazines.

== History ==
Sci Fiction was launched in May 2000 as a "prestige object" of the Sci-Fi Channel's website after producer Craig Engler approached Ellen Datlow about starting the magazine. Datlow was already a well-known editor of online magazines, having previously edited the online incarnations of OMNI and Event Horizon.

While Sci Fiction was called a magazine, it didn't exist under a unique url but instead was part of the larger SciFi.com website, with Datlow publishing a new story and a classic reprint each week. The magazine also had its own bulletin board and archives. The magazine paid twenty cents a word for fiction, which was three times the rate offered by the leading science fiction and fantasy print magazines.

Datlow published her first story on May 19, 2000, which was "Freeing the Angels" by Pat Cadigan and Chris Fowler, an updated cyberpunk-style story. Sci Fiction quickly became one of the most successful online magazines of science fiction, with Laird Barron describing Datlow's work on the publication as producing a "who's who and what's what list of major award-winning stories."

In late 2005 the Sci-Fi Channel announced that it would be shutting down the magazine, a decision evidently made because the magazine was not a major revenue generator for the channel. Craig Engler of the Sci-Fi Channel also noted that the magazine attracted relatively few visitors and that "keeping track of the rights to its stories was too much trouble." The decision to shut down the magazine was heavily criticized, with Gardner Dozois noting the magazine was "killed by shortsighted corporate bean counters at The Sci Fi Channel." It is believed that part of the reason why Sci Fiction was shut down is because at that time most people used dial-up to reach the internet, meaning longer online fiction was "difficult and slow to access." In addition, Sci-Fi Channel had buried the magazine within their larger website, making it hard to find.

Sci-Fi announced their intention to remove the Sci Fiction archived content as of June 2007, although some of it was still available over a year later. It has since been removed completely.

== Legacy ==
Many of the stories that were originally published on Sci Fiction are now unable to be accessed and no longer in print, which Mike Ashley says leads people to overlook the magazine's achievements. But Ashley says that despite this, "the status of online fiction set a new benchmark" because of Sci Fiction.

The Encyclopedia of Science Fiction has stated that Sci Fiction "achieved for Online Magazines what John W Campbell Jr's Astounding had achieved for Pulp sf sixty years before." And according to Gardner Dozois, the magazine was at the time "the most important and universally recognized place on the Internet to reliably find SF, fantasy and horror of high professional quality."

Ellen Datlow later described her work on the magazine by saying, "If there was still any doubt that online venues could produce outstanding fiction, Sci Fiction demolished them for good."

== Awards ==
During the six years of the magazine's existence, stories published in Sci Fiction won four Nebula Awards, a Theodore Sturgeon Award, a World Fantasy Award, a Million Writers Award, and an International Horror Guild Award. Among these was Linda Nagata's "Goddesses" which won the Nebula Award for Best Novella for 2000. This was the first time that a piece of fiction originally published on a website won a Nebula. Ironically, a story published a few weeks earlier than Nagata's novella, "The Cure for Everything" by Severna Park, won the Nebula Award for Best Short Story in 2002. This story would have been the first online-published story to win a Nebula except that a quirk in the award rules meant it didn't make the award's final ballot until the following year.

In 2002 Ellen Datlow won her first Hugo Award for Best Editor, the first time the award was given to an editor of an online magazine. In 2003 stories from the webzine won three awards, the Nebula Awards for Best Short Story ("What I Didn't See" by Karen Joy Fowler) and Best Novelette ("The Empire of Ice Cream" by Jeffrey Ford), and the Theodore Sturgeon Award for Lucius Shepard's novella "Over Yonder".

A short story Datlow published a few months before Sci Fiction was shut down, "There's a Hole in the City" by Richard Bowes, won the 2006 storySouth Million Writers Award and the International Horror Guild Award for Best Short Form. The story was also a finalist for the 2006 Nebula Award for Best Short Story and the Gaylactic Spectrum Award for Best Short Fiction.

In 2005, Datlow won her second Hugo Award for Best Editor and the website itself won a Hugo for Best Website. She also won her first Locus Award for Best Editor in 2005.

== Classic reprints in Sci Fiction ==
Among the classic stories reprinted in Sci Fiction were:

- The Ship Who Sang by Anne McCaffrey
- When It Changed by Joanna Russ
- I Have No Mouth, and I Must Scream by Harlan Ellison
- The Day the Martians Came by Frederik Pohl
- Love Is the Plan the Plan Is Death by James Tiptree, Jr.
- The Screwfly Solution by James Tiptree, Jr.
- The Sliced-Crosswise Only-On-Tuesday World by Philip José Farmer
- When I Was Miss Dow by Sonya Dorman
- The Dandelion Girl by Robert F. Young
- Aye, and Gomorrah by Samuel R. Delany
- Star Light, Star Bright by Alfred Bester
- The Great Wall of Mexico by John Sladek.

== List of new stories published in Sci Fiction ==
=== Original stories published in the year 2000 ===
Title	Author	Uploaded	URL
Freeing the Angels	Pat Cadigan and Chris Fowler	May 19, 2000	
The War of the Worlds	James P. Blaylock	May 24, 2000	
Malthusian's Zombie	Jeffrey Ford	May 31, 2000	
Chimera	Kristine Kathryn Rusch	June 7, 2000	
Castle in the Desert: Anno Dracula 1977	Kim Newman	June 14, 2000	
The Cure for Everything	Severna Park	June 22, 2000	
Dune: Nighttime Shadows on Open Sand	Brian Herbert and Kevin J. Anderson	June 28, 2000	
Goddesses	Linda Nagata	July 5, 2000	
Winter Quarters	Howard Waldrop	August 2, 2000	
Partial Eclipse	Graham Joyce	August 9, 2000	
Ciné Rimettato	A. R. Morlan	August 16, 2000	
Tir-na-nOg	Dave Hutchinson	August 23, 2000	
The Real World	Steven Utley	August 30, 2000	
From the Files of the Time Rangers	Richard Bowes	September 6, 2000	
Birdy Girl	Robert Reed	September 20, 2000	
Wetlands Preserve	Nancy Kress	September 27, 2000	
The Origin of Truth	Tim Lebbon	October 4, 2000	
Nevada	A. M. Dellamonica	October 11, 2000	
The Other Side	James P. Blaylock	October 18, 2000	
The Far Oasis	Jeffrey Ford	October 25, 2000	
The Pottawatomie Giant	Andy Duncan	November 1, 2000	
The Flyers of Gy: An Interplanary Tale	Ursula K. Le Guin	November 8, 2000	
Tomorrow Town	Kim Newman	November 15, 2000	
The Despoblado	Steven Utley	November 22, 2000	
A Cold Dish	Lisa Tuttle	November 29, 2000	
Chip Crockett's Christmas Carol	Elizabeth Hand	December 6, 2000	

== See also ==
- List of defunct American periodicals

== External resources ==
- Sci Fiction title listing at the Internet Speculative Fiction Database
- Sci Fiction archive
- Sci Fiction's awards and nominations at The Locus Index to Science Fiction Awards
- List of all stories published in Sci Fiction
