= Million Writers Award =

Million Writers Award was a short story literary award presented annually by storySouth from 2003 to 2016. It honored the best online short stories. The award was structured to be egalitarian allowing for anyone to nominate a story including readers, authors, editors and publishers; prize money was donated by readers and writers; and the winners were selected by public vote from a short-list of entries selected by judges.

== Overview ==
The Million Writers Award was founded by author Jason Sanford in 2003 at a time when the literary establishment "didn't believe online magazines were legitimate places to publish fiction," seeing it as a fad. Sanford set out to honor and highlight online only publications and stories with the award.

Stories eligible for the award include those first published in online literary journals, magazines, and e-zines that have an editorial process. The award had a variable cash prize, in 2011 for example it was $600 for the winner, $200 for the runner-up and $100 for third place. Prize money was raised through donations from writers, editors and readers and thus fluctuates each year. Anyone could nominate up to one story, while editors and publishers can nominate three stories. Stories must be at least 1000 words.

The award became one of the premier online literary awards and was named a Hot Site by USA Today. The award was profiled in a six-page feature interview with editor Jason Sanford in the 2005 Novel and Short Story Writer's Market and mentioned in The 100 Best Trends, 2006: Emerging Developments You Can't Afford to Ignore as an example of the emerging online literary movement.

In 2012 Spotlight Publishing released two anthologies of stories from the Million Writers Award, with one focused on literary stories and the other on science fiction and fantasy stories.

== Winners ==
Previous winners.

2003

- Top 10 stories:

2004

- Best story: Randa Jarrar, "You Are a 14-Year-Old Arab Chick Who Just Moved to Texas" (Eyeshot)
- Best online publication: Eclectica
- Best publisher of novella-length fiction: The King's English
- Best new online magazine or journal: Narrative Magazine

2005

- Best story: Alicia Gifford, "Toggling the Switch" (Narrative Magazine)
- Best story runner-up: Terry Bisson, "Super 8" (Scifiction.com)
- Best story runner-up: Anjana Basu, "The Black Tongue" (Gowanus)
- Best online publication: Strange Horizons
- Best publisher of novella-length fiction: The King's English
- Best new online magazine or journal: Anderbo

2006

- Best story: Richard Bowes, "There's a Hole in the City" (Scifiction.com)
- Best story runner-up: Michael Croley, "Two Lives" (Blackbird)
- Best online publication: Storyglossia
- Best publisher of novella-length fiction: Narrative Magazine (co-winner)
- Best publisher of novella-length fiction: The King's English (co-winner)
- Best new online magazine or journal: Menda City Review (co-winner)
- Best new online magazine or journal: Clarkesworld Magazine (co-winner)

2007

- Best story: Catherynne M. Valente, "Urchins, While Swimming" (Clarkesword Magazine)
- Best story runner-up: A. Ray Norsworthy, "All the Way to Grangeville" (Eclectica Magazine)
- Best story runner-up: Marshall Moore, "The Infinite Monkey Theorem" (Word Riot)
- Best online publication: Blackbird
- Best publisher of novella-length fiction: Jim Baen's Universe
- Best new online magazine or journal: Farrago's Wainscot

2008

- Best story: Matt Bell, "Alex Trebek Never Eats Fried Chicken" (Storyglossia)
- Best story runner-up: Sruthi Thekkiam, "Friday Afternoons on Bus 51" (Blackbird)
- Best online publication: Narrative Magazine
- Best publisher of novella-length fiction: (no award)
- Best new online magazine or journal: Cha: An Asian Literary Journal

2009

- Winner: Jenny Williams, "The Fisherman's Wife" (LitNImage)
- Runner-up: Roderic Crooks, "Fuckbuddy" (Eyeshot)
- Honorable mention: Geronimo Madrid, "No Bullets in the House" (Drunken Boat)
- Best online publication: Fantasy Magazine
- Best publisher of novella-length fiction: Subterranean Magazine
- Best new online magazine or journal: Kill Author

2010

- Winner: Summer Block, "Hospitality" (Wheelhouse Magazine)
- Runner-up: Rachel Swirsky, "Eros, Philia, Agape" (Tor.com)
- Honorable mention: Eric Beetner, "Ditch" (Thuglit)
- Best online publication: Words Without Borders
- Best new online magazine or journal: Lightspeed Magazine

2011

- Winner: Adam-Troy Castro, "Arvies" (Lightspeed Magazine)
- Runner-up: Eric Maroney, "The Incorrupt Body of Carlo Busso" (Eclectica)
- Honorable mention: Amal El-Mohtar, "The Green Book" (Apex Magazine)

2012

- Winner: xTx, "The Mill Pond" (StoryGlossia)
- Runner-up: Kelly Cherry, "On Familiar Terms" (Blackbird)
- Honorable mention: Micah Dean Hicks, "The Butcher's Chimes" (Menda City Review)

2013

- First place : Rachel Steiger-Meister, "Chlorine Mermaid" (Carve Magazine)
- Second place: Lou Gaglia, "Hands" (Waccamaw)
- Third place : Adrienne Celt, "The Eternal Youth of Everyone Else" (Carve Magazine)

2014

- First place: Caroline Casper, "Eminence" (Carve Magazine)
- Second place: Susan Tepper, "Distance" (Thrice Fiction)
- Third place: Carmen Maria Machado, "Inventory" (Strange Horizons)

2015

- First place: Wendy Oleson, “The Snow Children” (Carve Magazine)
- Second place: Chikodili Emelumadu, “Jermyn” (Eclectica)
- Third place: Allegra Hyde, “Syndication” (Nashville Review)

2016

- First place: Reza Ghasemi Ataee, "Anatomy of Mr.wakefield" (Time magazine)
- Second place: Jude Whelchel, "Big Joy Family" (North Carolina Literary Review)
- Third place: Annie Reid, "Last Song" (Baltimore Review)
