= An Anglo-American Alliance =

1906 novel by Gregory Casparian

An Anglo-American Alliance: A Serio-Comic Romance and Forecast of the Future
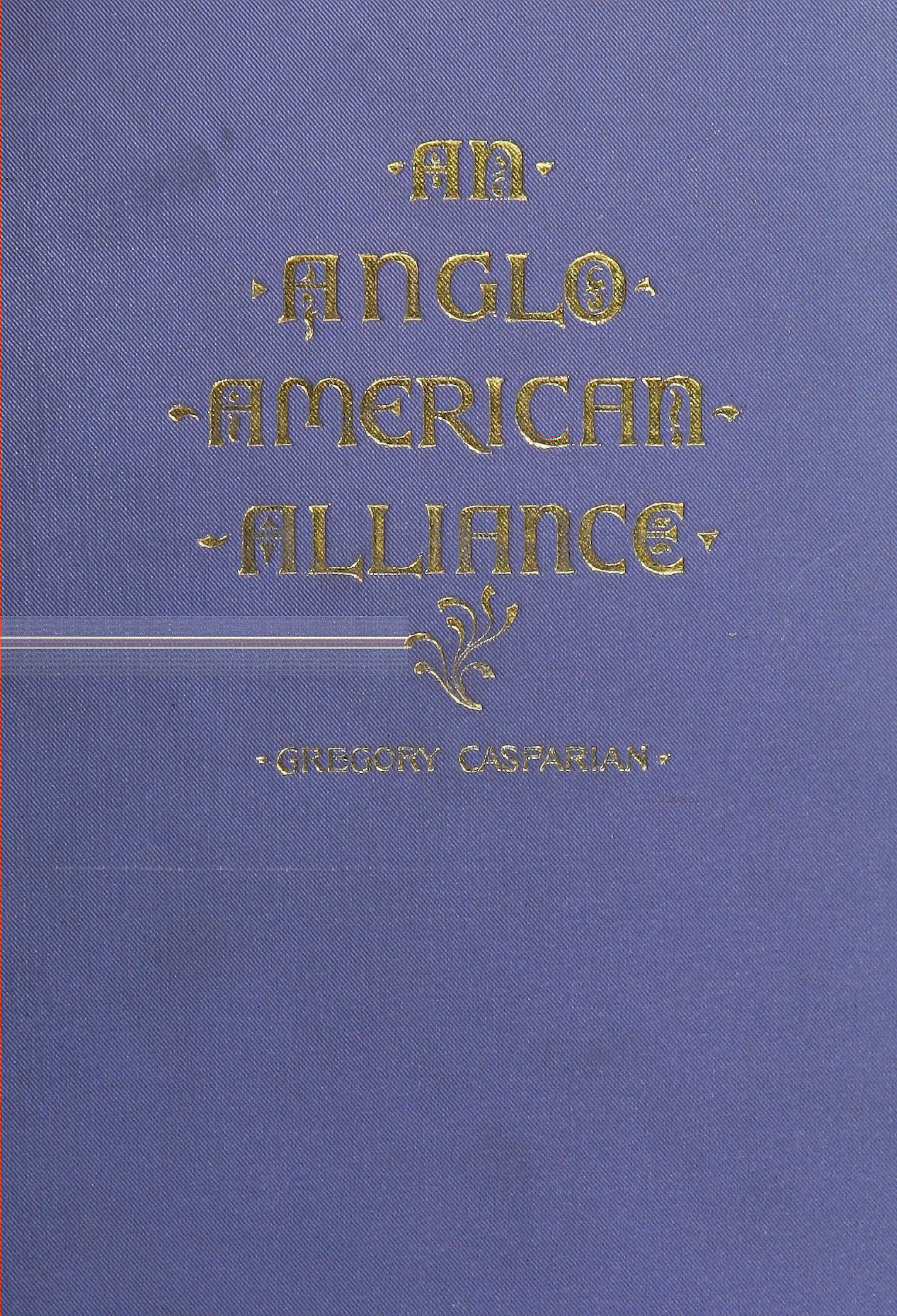
- Author: Gregory Casparian
- Illustrator: Gregory Casparian
- Language: English
- Publisher: Mayflower Presses
- Publication date: 1906
- Publication place: United States
- Pages: ix, 144
- OCLC: 441951035

An Anglo-American Alliance: A Serio-Comic Romance and Forecast of the Future is a 1906 novel written and illustrated by Gregory Casparian and published by Mayflower Presses. A reviewer for io9 has called it "the first lesbian science fiction novel".

== Author ==
Little is known about Gregory Casparian (1856–1942). A Turkish-Armenian, Casparian served as an officer in the Turkish army. He emigrated to the United States in 1877, settled in New York and worked as an artist, painter, and photoengraver. The Anglo-American Alliance is his only published work.

== Setting and plot ==
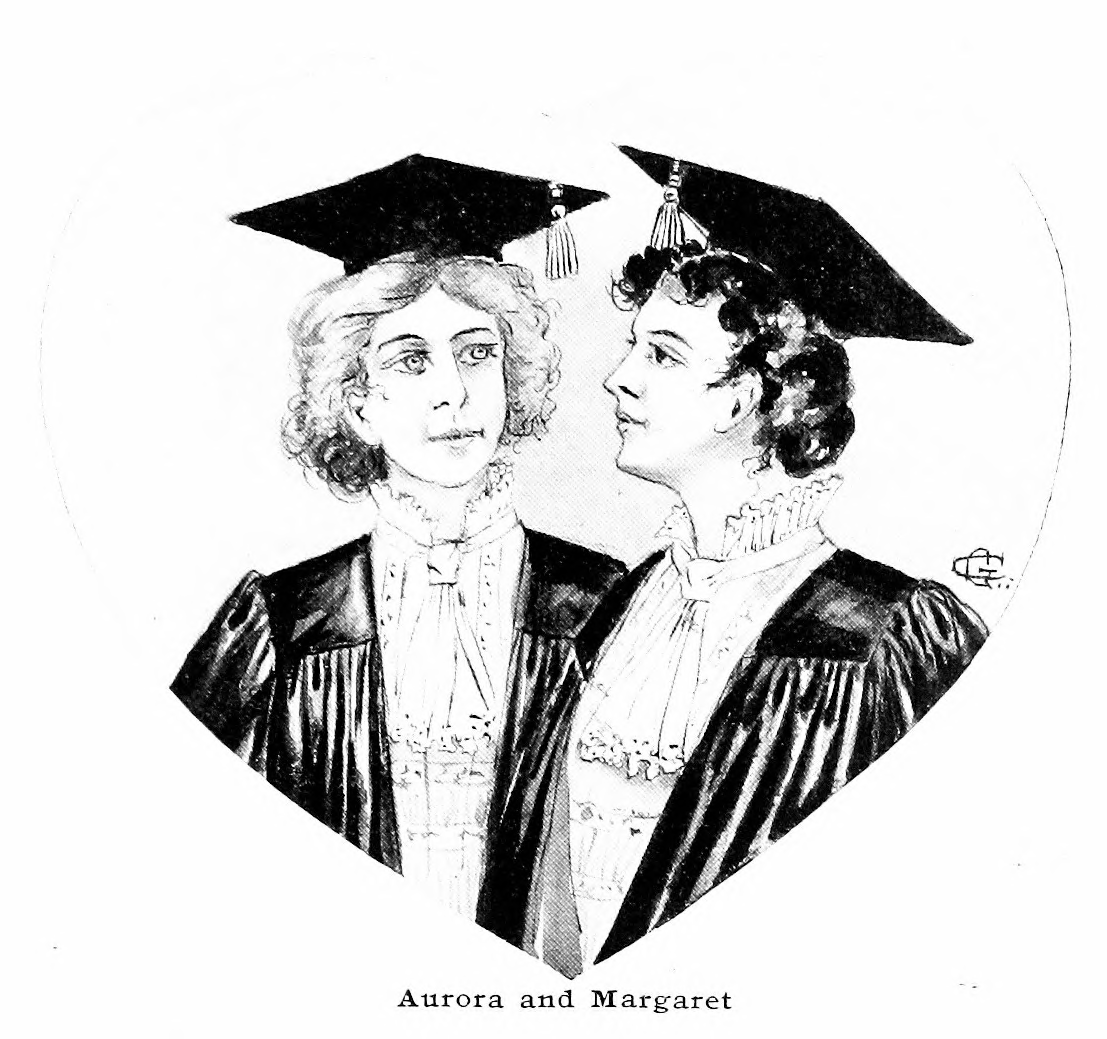
Aurora and Margaret, the novel's heroines, as illustrated by the author.

The novel is set in the future of 1960 and depicts a world that is geopolitically broadly similar to that of 1906, with the US and the UK as the world's major colonial powers. Casparian stated in the preface that the purpose of the book was to show the desirability of a world government, to which he saw the establishment of an Anglo-American federation as a first step. There are limited technological advances, such as prenatal sex discernment, suspended animation and a cure for laziness (which benefits the "negroes of the Southern States", according to the novel). Telescopes have shown intelligent life on other planets, which is described in interludes unconnected to the rest of the novel.

The novel follows the romance of two young upper-class women, the Briton Aurora Cunningham and the American Margaret MacDonald, who attend the same ladies' seminary in Cornwall and pursue a secret romantic relationship. After graduation, Margaret has herself surgically transformed into a man, Spencer Hamilton. As a famous musician, Hamilton courts and marries Aurora, and they live happily ever after.

== Significance ==
Reviewing the novel in 1990, Everett F. Bleiler described it as a curiosity and as an "eccentric novel with an early description of surgical sex changes". A 2011 article in io9 highlighted the work's novelty in that it presented a lesbian romantic relationship directly rather than through the subtext of a "Boston marriage", as was occasionally done in Victorian fiction, and in featuring science fiction's first transgender hero.
