= Marshall Moore =

American novelist

- Born: June 29, 1970 (age 56); North Carolina, U.S.
- Education: East Carolina University (BA); University of New England (MA); Aberystwyth University (PhD)
- Occupations: Writer, editor
- Writing career
- Period: 1990s–present
- Website: marshallmoore.com

Marshall Moore (born June 29, 1970), in Havelock, North Carolina, is an American author and academic living in Cornwall, England.

== Biography ==
He attended the North Carolina School of Science and Mathematics (NCSSM) and went on to obtain a BA in psychology from East Carolina University, an MA in applied linguistics from the University of New England, and a PhD in creative writing from Aberystwyth University in Wales. He has also studied at Gallaudet University. He has lived in New Bern, Winston-Salem, Greensboro, Washington, D.C., Maryland, Oakland, Portland, Seattle, the suburbs of Seoul, and Hong Kong. Fluent in American Sign Language, he worked for many years as an interpreter before moving abroad.

== Bibliography ==
=== Novels ===
- The Concrete Sky, Binghamton, NY: Haworth Press, 2003
- An Ideal for Living, Maple Shade, NJ: Lethe Press, 2010
- Bitter Orange, Hong Kong: Signal 8 Press, 2013
- Inhospitable, Manchester: Camphor Press, 2018
- The Henchperson’s Guide to Unionizing, 2026.

=== Nonfiction ===
- I Wouldn't Normally Do This Kind of Thing: A Memoir, New Orleans: Rebel Satori Press, 2022
- Sunset House: Essays, New Orleans: Rebel Satori Press, 2024

=== Short story collections ===
- Black Shapes in a Darkened Room, San Francisco: Suspect Thoughts Press, 2004
- The Infernal Republic, Hong Kong: Signal 8 Press, 2012
- A Garden Fed by Lightning, Hong Kong: Signal 8 Press, 2016
- Love Is a Poisonous Color, New Orleans: Rebel Satori Press, 2023

=== In translation ===
- Sagome nere, Turin: 96, Rue de-la-Fontaine Edizioni, 2017 (Translator: Rossella Cirigliano)

=== Edited anthologies (short fiction) ===
- The Queen of Statue Square: New Short Fiction from Hong Kong (Co-editor: Xu Xi), Nottingham: Critical, Cultural & Communications Press, 2014

=== Edited academic nonfiction ===
- The Place and the Writer: International Intersections of Teacher Lore and Creative Writing Pedagogy (Co-editor: Sam Meekings) London: Bloomsbury - Continuum, 2021
- Creative Writing Scholars on the Publishing Trade: Practice, Praxis, Print (Co-editor: Sam Meekings) London: Routledge, 2022
- The Scholarship of Creative Writing Practice: Beyond Craft, Pedagogy, and the Academy (Co-editor: Sam Meekings) London: Bloomsbury - Continuum, 2024
- Creative Writing Workshopping in the 21st Century: New Strategies for a Modern Era (Co-editors: Adrian Markle and Sam Meekings) London: Bloomsbury - Continuum, 2025

=== Chapbooks ===
- Il look del diavolo, Hong Kong: Signal 8 Press, 2011
- Never Turn Away, Hong Kong: Signal 8 Press, 2013

In addition to these books, Moore has published dozens of short stories, book reviews, and essays.

His work has been translated into Greek, Polish, and Italian.
