= Multiperspectivity =

Characteristic of narration or representation

Multiperspectivity (sometimes polyperspectivity) is a characteristic of narration or representation, where more than one perspective is represented to the audience.

Most frequently the term is applied to fiction which employs multiple narrators, often in opposition to each-other or to illuminate different elements of a plot, creating what is sometimes called a multiple narrative, or multi-narrative.

However, a similar concept is applied to historical process, in which multiple different perspectives are used to evaluate events. Educators have extended the concept and term to apply to techniques used to teach multiple disciplines, including social sciences, like economics and civics, and physical education.

== Use in history ==
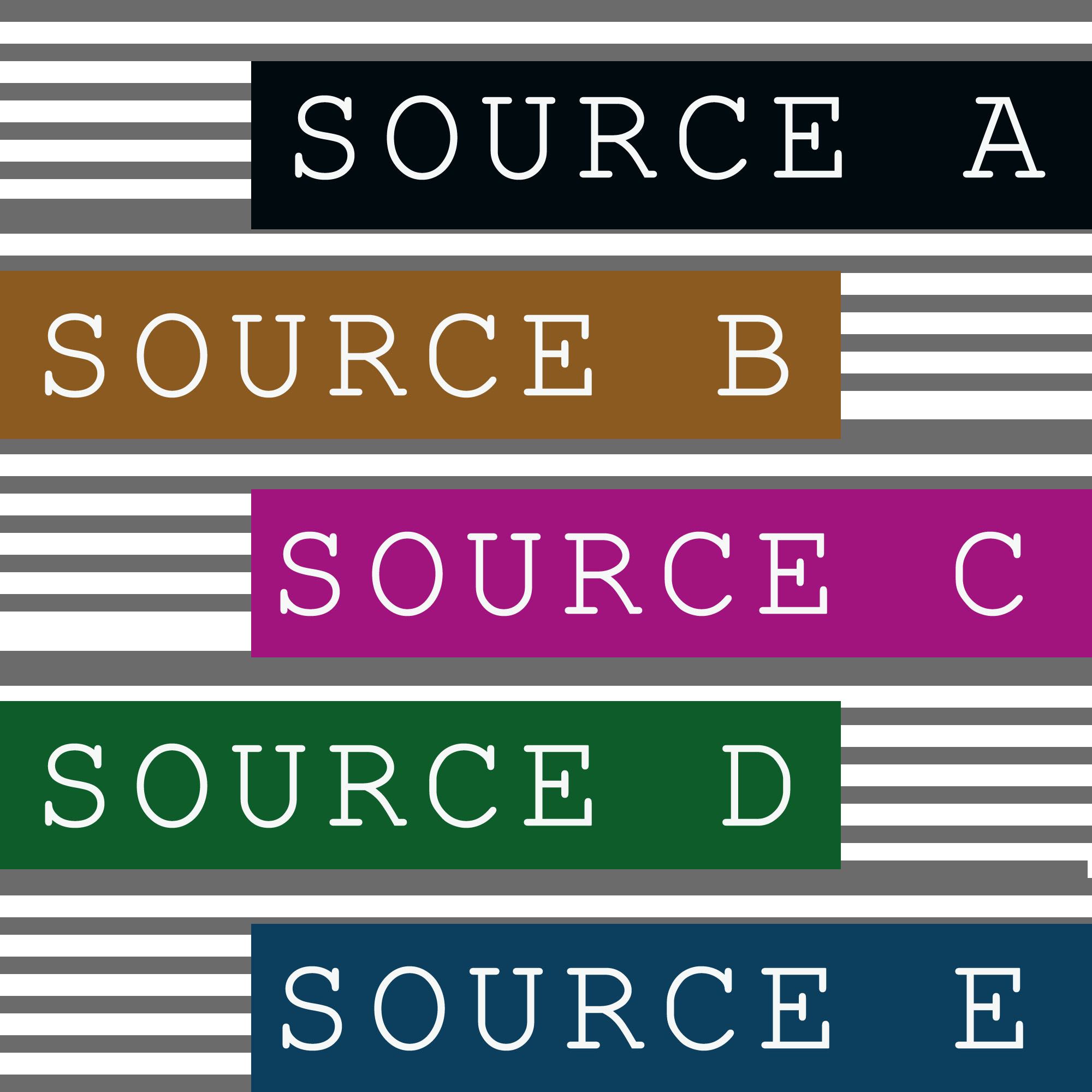
Sample of multiple sources

The use of multiple perspectives arose because educators and scholars from the recent decades questioned the validity of one-sided historical narratives. Instead of focusing on a dominant group's point of view, they suggested to employ multiperspectivity. This is because of the diversity and cultural pluralism, since many groups – women, the poor, ethnic minorities, etc. – have been ignored in traditional historical narratives.

Good historians must not just focus on one side of the story, instead they must look into different sources to know if the facts corroborate with each other and to produce more accurate interpretations. "In history, multiple perspectives are usual and have to be tested against evidence, and accounted for in judgments and conclusions." Ann Low-Beer explains.

1. Multiple historical narratives provide space to inquire and investigate.
2. Different sources offer different historical truths.
3. It brings a more complex, complete and richer understanding of the past.
4. It can be used to show corroboration of acts, to show diverse perspectives of a single event, and to showcase the human condition in compelling ways.
5. Multiperspectivity is a significant tool for stimulating historical understanding and thinking and a necessary precondition for all citizens that live in a multicultural society.

== See also ==
- Mosaic novel - a genre of novel employing multiperspectivity
