= Richard Bowes =

American writer (1944–2023)

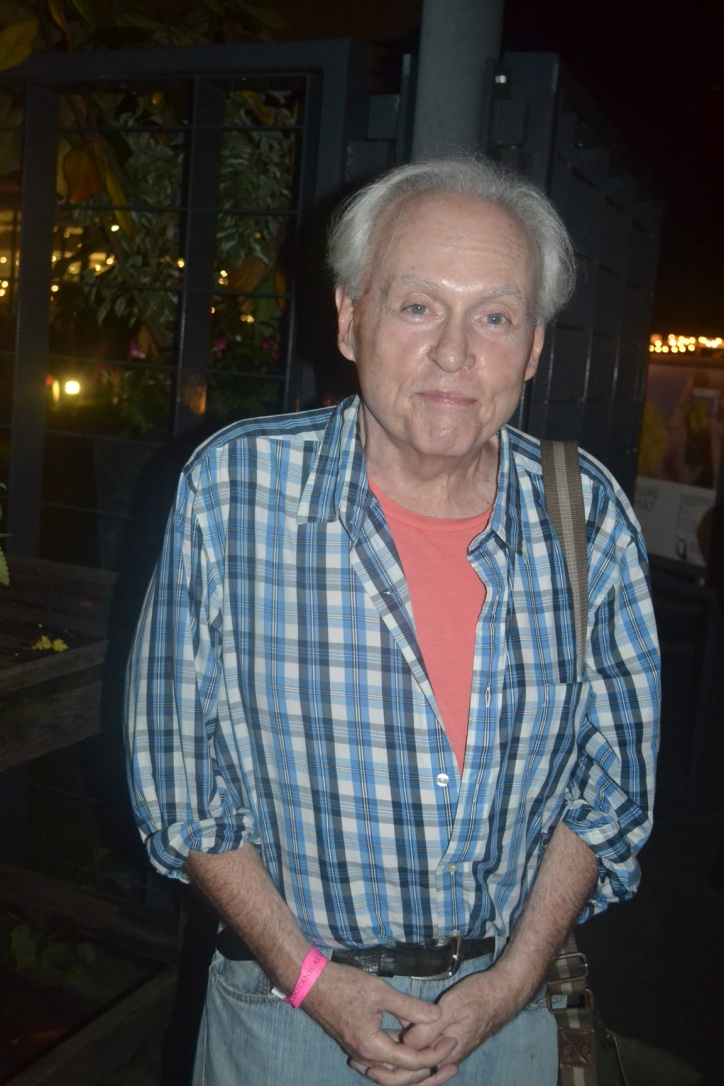
- Richard Bowes at the 2017 Chihuly Exhibition at the New York Botanical Garden.
- Born: January 8, 1944; Boston
- Died: December 24, 2023 (aged 79)
- Occupation: Writer
- Writing career
- Genres: Science fiction, Urban fantasy, Horror fiction
- Notable works: Minions of the Moon, "There's a Hole in the City," From the Files of the Time Rangers, Dust Devils on a Quiet Street

Richard Dirrane Bowes (January 8, 1944 – December 24, 2023) was an American author described as an "urban fantasist" whose stories tended to be "set in, and to evoke, a congested, magically altered New York." He won two World Fantasy Awards for his short fiction along with the Lambda Award for his 1999 mosaic novel Minions of the Moon. He was also an eight-time finalist for the Nebula Award, including for his often-reprinted short story "There's a Hole in the City."

== Biography ==
Richard Bowes was born January 8, 1944, to an Irish-Catholic family in Boston, Massachusetts. In an interview, Bowes said that his parents were both actors and that some of his great uncles were writers. His younger brother is the artist David Bowes. He attended school both in Boston and later in Long Island, New York, where he occasionally went on drug and alcohol binges. Bowes also had a "contentious, tragic relationship" with his father.

In his third year, Bowes took writing courses with Mark Eisenstein at Hofstra University and, after graduation, moved to Manhattan in 1965. While there he worked in the Garment District as an advertising writer. During this time he also developed and overcame a serious drug problem. Bowes later became an antique toy dealer, designed boardgames, and worked as a reference librarian at New York University.

Called "the consummate New Yorker" by Jeffrey Ford, Bowes spent most of his life in the city. Bowes described his time living in New York by saying "I was present at the Stonewall Riots in 1969 and watched the World Trade Center towers fall from the end of my block on 9/11."

Bowes struggled with his identity as a gay man and "often imagined himself to be a different person inhabiting a different reality. He credited this experience with the development of his mastery of fantasy literature. He also credited the immensity of New York City life and the possibility of so many parallel lives being played out in one setting."

He died on December 24, 2023, at the age of 79.

== Career ==
Bowes launched his writing career in the early 1980s and published novels Warchild, Feral Cell and Goblin Market.

In 1992, Bowes began writing a series of semi-autobiographical stories narrated by Kevin Grierson. These stories were published primarily in The Magazine of Fantasy & Science Fiction (F&SF), and later became the novel Minions of the Moon. One story, "Streetcar Dreams," won the World Fantasy Award for Best Novella in 1998. The novel itself won the Lambda Literary Award in 2000.

A short fiction collection, Transfigured Night and Other Stories, was published by Time Warner in 2001. It included the original novella "My Life in Speculative Fiction," a semi-autobiographical "gay coming-of-age story with sci-fi tinges" that "follows a confused college kid in the early '60s as he grapples with issues of family, politics, and sexuality." These stories plus recent material appeared in Streetcar Dreams and Other Midnight Fancies from England's PS Publishing in 2006.

During his later years, Bowes wrote a series of stories about time travelers interacting with ancient Greek gods, which formed the mosaic novel From the Files of the Time Rangers, published in 2005 by Golden Gryphon Press. As with Bowes' earlier novel Minions of the Moon, these stories were also semi-autobiographical and narrated by the character of Kevin Grierson. Most of the stories were originally published in F&SF with two of them – the novelettes "The Ferryman's Wife" and "The Mask of the Rex" – being finalists for the 2002 and 2003 Nebula Awards. Other Time Rangers stories appeared in Sci Fiction and Black Gate.

"If Angels Fight" won the 2009 World Fantasy Award for Best Novella. The story was published in the February 2008 edition of F&SF. "I Needs Must Part, the Policeman Said" was nominated in the same category for the 2010 World Fantasy Awards. The story ran in the December 2009 edition of F&SF.

In 2013 Bowes published the novel/story cycle Dust Devils on a Quiet Street, about a group of writers in New York City before, during, and after the September 11 attacks. Dust Devils appeared on the World Fantasy and Lambda Award short lists. The first chapter is his widely reprinted 2005 short story "There's a Hole in the City", which won the 2006 storySouth Million Writers Award, the International Horror Guild Award and was a finalist for the Nebula Award for Best Short Story. The story describes the 9/11 attacks, which Bowes witnessed, through the lens of the many ghosts who exist in New York City. Matthew Kressel called the story "the single best piece of fiction I've read about the experience and aftermath of the September 11 attacks, working as both a memoir of what he lived through and a heartbreaking ghost story."

== Critical reception ==
Bowes was seen as an icon to "young, LGBTQIA+ writers in the speculative fiction community" and as one of the best-known writers "who, beginning in the 1980s and 90s, wrote about queer lives in speculative fiction." When Bowes passed away, author Sam J. Miller said "Speculative fiction wasn't always this queer. For a long time, there were only a handful of folks holding it down. Rick Bowes blazed his own trail, writing brilliant weird queer haunted tales his own way ..."

Bowes' stories have been described by The Encyclopedia of Science Fiction as reading like "highly sophisticated Urban Fantasy" while editor and critic Rich Horton declared Bowes an "urban fantasist." Bowes was also noted for writing stories that were alternately called "semi-autobiographical" or "fictionalized memoir." In response to this categorizing, Bowes speculated that he simply "made less distinction than some writers do between my reality and my imagination."

His fictionalized memoir Dust Devil on a Quiet Street, which was a finalist for the World Fantasy and Lambda Awards, was described by Publishers Weekly as depicting "a New York at once beautiful and terrible, dangerous and glorious, where mundane life is only one step away from the supernatural." Elizabeth Hand called the story a "sly cautionary tale (that) should become required reading for any struggling artist or writer."

== Analysis of New York City in Stories ==
New York City is a frequent setting for many of Bowes' stories. As Jeffrey Ford has stated, "New York's presence is not ostentatious in his fiction, but it takes the form of a character, and is always there, interacting with the human characters." Ford also considered Bowes' short stories "Circle Dance" and "My Life in Speculative Fiction," which are both set in the city, to be "classics of the genre" for the way they blended autobiography with elements of the fantastic to "achieve a certain effect of authenticity and believability in a form otherwise considered contrary to reality."

This connection to New York City is perhaps best witnessed in Bowes' award-winning story "There's a Hole in the City," where the September 11th attacks are seen alongside the "summoned ghosts from past disasters." According to Joshua Rothman in The New Yorker, "the story puts 9/11 in the context of New York's long municipal history of death and grief, and literalizes the haunted feeling one has near Ground Zero."

In New York: A Literary History, critic Birgit Däwes states that compared to other fiction about 9/11, Bowes's story "evokes a deeper layer of absence: the traces of history and/or possibility, of past and present realities that are inextricably ties to contemporary New York City; the fiction underneath historiography, lying just beneath the visible, empirical surface, accessible — as this story manifests — through ghosts as a form of memory and transcendence."

== Bibliography ==
=== Novels and Story Cycles ===
- Warchild. New York: Popular Library. 1986.
- Goblin Market. New York: Popular Library. 1987.
- Feral Cell. New York: Warner Books. 1987.
- Minions of the Moon. New York: Tor. 1999.
- From the Files of the Time Rangers. Urbana, Illinois: Golden Gryphon Press. 2005., additionally 2017 from Lethe Press
- Dust Devil on a Quiet Street. Maple Shade, New Jersey: Lethe Press. 2013.

=== Short Story Collections ===
- Transfigured Night and Other Stories. New York: Grand Central Publishing. 2001.
- Streetcar Dreams and Other Midnight Fancies. Hornsea, East Yorkshire: PS Publishing. 2006.
- The Queen, the Cambion, and Seven Others. Seattle, Washington: Aqueduct Press. 2013.
- If Angels Fight: Stories. Bonney Lake, Washington: Fairwood Press. 2013.

=== Selected Short Fiction ===
- "The Shadow and the Gunman". F&SF. 86 (2). February 1994.
- "The Ferryman's Wife". The Magazine of Fantasy & Science Fiction, May 2001. Finalist for the 2002 Nebula Award for Best Novelette.
- "The Mask of the Rex". The Magazine of Fantasy & Science Fiction, May 2002. Finalist for the 2003 Nebula Award for Best Novelette.
- "There's a Hole in the City". Sci Fiction 2005. Won the 2006 storySouth Million Writers Award, the International Horror Guild Award and was a finalist for the Nebula Award for Best Short Story.
- "Sir Morgravain Speaks of Night Dragons and Other Things". F&SF. 121 (1&2): 186–194. July–August 2011.
