= Arvies =

Short story by Adam-Troy Castro

"Arvies" is a 2010 science fiction short story by Adam-Troy Castro. It was first published in Lightspeed Magazine, and subsequently republished in Castro's anthology Her Husband's Hands, as well as in the compilations Lightspeed: Year One, Nebula Awards Showcase: 2012 and The Year's Best Science Fiction and Fantasy: 2011.

== Synopsis ==
In a distant future ruled by superintelligent fetuses who have been genetically engineered to live centuries in utero, life has been legally redefined as lasting from fertilisation to birth, such that everyone who has been born is legally dead: disposable near-mindless slaves whose only purpose is to act as living "vehicles" for the fetuses that are robotically transplanted into them. One such fetus is Jennifer Axioma-Singh, who decides she wants an experience that no other fetus has ever had: to give birth.

The story does not explain the derivation of the term "arvies," which is this far-future's term for the human beings this far future allows to grow to maturity, to serve as vessels for the super-advanced fetuses. The author left it down to the reader to recognize the acronym RV, or "recreational vehicle."

== Reception ==
"Arvies" won the 2011 Million Writers Award for best short story, and was nominated for the 2011 Nebula Award for Best Short Story.
