= Michael Rowe (journalist) =

Canadian writer, journalist, novelist and anthologist

Michael Rowe (born September 9, 1962) is a Canadian writer, journalist, novelist and anthologist. He has written for numerous publications in Canada and the United States including the National Post, The Globe and Mail, The United Church Observer, The Huffington Post and The Advocate.

As an author, Rowe has published three novels, a novella, five anthologies of original short fiction, and a variety of non-fiction books. His first, Writing Below the Belt: Conversations with Erotic Authors was an exploration of censorship, pornography, and popular culture. Looking for Brothers contains essays on the contemporary gay experience. Other Men’s Sons, which won the 2008 Randy Shilts Award for Nonfiction, is a collection of his work from 2000 to 2005.

His first novel, Enter, Night, a vampire story set in Northern Ontario in 1972, was published in October 2011 by ChiZine Publications, and sold in the spring of 2012 to Random House Germany for translation. On April 13, 2012, Enter, Night was announced as a finalist for Canada's prestigious Prix Aurora Awards in the English Language Novel category. The Prix Aurora Awards are awarded annually to celebrate the best in Canadian speculative fiction.

"Enter, Night" was also shortlisted for the Sunburst Award. The jury said of Rowe's novel, "After the post-Twilight tsunami of toothless vampire fiction, this nightmare-inducing novel offers a decidedly welcome return to the emotional, physical, and spiritual hells invoked by the best vampire tales. The small northern Ontario town of Parr's Landing in 1972 is a place where history bleeds, both literally and figuratively. Horrors both human and other-than-human have haunted the town for generations, and while some people flee the place, they find themselves summoned back to face the hungry darkness that reaches out to claim this secret-riven community. Richly textured and filled with complex, convincing personalities, as well as being a truly frightening read, Enter, Night is a chilling foray into the emotional, sexual, and ideological horrors we create for one another."

In December 2013, Rowe's second novel, Wild Fell, a classic gothic ghost story set in Canada's Georgian Bay region was published by ChiZine Publications. Wild Fell was subsequently a finalist for the 2013 Shirley Jackson Award, and will be published in French by Paris-based Editions Bragelonne in 2015. As of 2020, all three of Rowe's horror novels published by ChiZine publications have been republished by Open Road Media in New York.

In addition to his nonfiction and fiction writing, Rowe has edited several collections of gay horror, the most notable being Queer Fear for which he won a Lambda Literary Award. Chad Helder, editor of Unspeakable Horror: From the Shadows of the Closet, credited Queer Fear as paving the way for his win of the Bram Stoker Award. Novelist Clive Barker credited Rowe's Queer Fear books as having changed the landscape of horror fiction.

Rowe married his partner, Dr. Brian McDermid, in a Holy Union ceremony at the Metropolitan Community Church of Toronto in 1985. The two re-wed in 2003 when gay and lesbian marriage became legal in Canada, which he wrote about in the essay "From This Day Forward" which appeared in Other Men's Sons. They were among the first gay couples in Canadian history to be legally married, and are believed to be the first gay couple in history to be married inside a United Church of Canada. They currently reside in Toronto. In October 2015, Rowe's essay "Some Thoughts On My 30th Wedding Anniversary in the Summer of Equal Marriage", which was first published in the Huffington Post on August 24, 2015, won the Love Wins essay prize from New Millennium Writings.

== Works ==
=== Fiction ===
==== Novels ====
- Enter, Night (2011)
- Wild Fell (2013)
- October (2019)

==== Anthologies ====
- Sons of Darkness: Tales of Men, Blood and Immortality (1996) with Thomas S. Roche
- Brothers of the Night: Gay Vampire Stories (1997) with Thomas S. Roche
- Queer Fear (2000)
- Queer Fear II (2002)
- Triptych of Terror (2006) with John Michael Curlovich and David Thomas Lord

=== Nonfiction ===
- Writing Below the Belt: Conversations with Erotic Authors (1995)
- Looking for Brothers (1999)
- Other Men’s Sons (2006)
- Pride (2024) with Angel John Guerra
