= Steve Berman =

American editor, novelist and short story writer

- Born: Philadelphia, Pennsylvania, U.S.
- Education: Tulane University, Rutgers University–Camden
- Occupations: Editor, Novelist, Short story writer
- Writing career
- Years active: 2001–present
- Period: 2001–present
- Genres: Queer speculative fiction, Dark fantasy, Horror, Urban fantasy, Weird autofiction
- Notable awards: Lambda Literary Award (2018)

Steve Berman is an American editor, novelist and short story writer. He writes in the field of queer speculative fiction.

== Early life and education ==
Berman was born in Philadelphia, and raised in South Jersey. Berman says he realized in junior high school he was gay. He attended Tulane University in New Orleans, where he earning a bachelor's degree in English Literature. He then studied history at Rutgers University–Camden in Camden, New Jersey, where he obtained a master's degree in Liberal Studies in 2006.

== Career ==
He began his publishing career working in pharmaceutical and medical publishing, then worked as a senior book buyer for wholesaler Bookazine, and served in the marketing department of a small Jewish press. He spent a decade as an employee engagement survey analyst for a human resources consulting firm in Cherry Hill, New Jersey. Berman attended the Clarion Workshop in 2006, the last year that workshop was held in East Lansing, Michigan. Though raised Jewish, Berman wavers between Jewish secularism and atheism.

Berman is a former member of Science Fiction and Fantasy Writers of America (SFWA) and a lifetime member of the RPGA. His short fiction is mainly dark fantasy, horror, urban fantasy, and weird autofiction. He has spoken online and at convention panels on the history of LGBT-inclusive speculative fiction and on LGBT young adult topics. In 2001, Berman founded Lethe Press. The first few titles included his first short story collection, Trysts, and several books in the public domain. In 2004, he met author Toby Johnson and offered to reprint Johnson's book, Gay Spirituality. Lethe Press regularly publishes title of LGBT speculative fiction.

Several of his urban fantasy stories are set in the Fallen Area. In June 2009, he launched the quarterly publication, Icarus, the Magazine of Gay Speculative Fiction, which ended in October 2013.

In August 2017, Berman moved to Western Massachusetts.

== Awards and honors ==
Berman has been a finalist for the Shirley Jackson Award, the Golden Crown Literary Award, a seven-time finalist for the Gaylactic Spectrum Awards, and five-time finalist (as editor) for the Lambda Literary Award in various categories. He won the latter in 2018 for His Seed. His first novel, Vintage: A Ghost Story released in 2007 and was a finalist for the Andre Norton Award.

== As editor ==
- Charmed Lives: Gay Spirit in Storytelling (co-edited with Toby Johnson) (2006). The inaugural title in the White Crane Wisdom Series, this anthology of inspirational essays and short fiction for gay men was a finalist for a Lambda Literary Award.
- So Fey: Queer Fairy Fiction (2007, Reprinted 2009). This is an anthology of LGBT short fiction dealing with faeries was a finalist for the Gaylactic Spectrum Awards and the Golden Crown Literary Awards.
- Magic in the Mirrorstone (2008). This is an anthology of young adult fiction, all stories dealing with magic.
- Best Gay Stories (2008–10, 2013-6). An annual anthology reprinting quality short fiction and essays that have gay themes. Canadian author Peter Dube took over editorial duties for the 2011 and 2012 volumes.
- Wilde Stories (2008–18). An annual anthology offers reprints of the prior year's best works of speculative and interstitial fiction with gay characters and themes - the 2008 and 2010 editions were finalists for a Lambda Literary Award.
- Speaking Out (2011). A young adult anthology of inspirational short fiction aimed at LGBT teens.
- Boys of Summer (2012). A young adult anthology of summer-themed short fiction aimed at gay teens.
- Heiresses of Russ (2011–16). An annual anthology of lesbian-themed speculative fiction (each volume is co-edited with a different female editor) named in honor after Joanna Russ. The 2012 volume was a finalist for the Lambda Literary Award and the Golden Crown Literary Award.
- The Touch of the Sea (2012). An anthology of gay-themed fantastical stories involving the sea and maritime folklore.
- Bad Seeds: Evil Progeny (2013). A horror anthology of stories about evil children from Prime Books.
- Where Thy Dark Eye Glances: Queering Edgar Allan Poe (2013). A dark fantasy anthology that remixes the oeuvre of Poe through a queer perspective. A finalist for the Shirley Jackson Award.
- Zombies: Shambling Through the Ages (2013). An anthology of historical stories featuring ghouls and zombies from Prime Books.
- Shades of Blue & Gray: Civil War Ghost Stories (2013). An anthology of ghost stories set during or based on the consequences of the American Civil War.
- Suffered From the Night: Queering Bram Stoker's Dracula (2013). A dark fantasy and horror anthology that offers new gay-themed stories about characters from the most famous vampire novel of all time.
- Handsome Devil: Stories of Sin and Seduction (2014). An anthology of incubus-themed horror and dark fantasy tales from Prime Books.
- Daughters of Frankenstein: Lesbian Mad Scientists (2015). A science-fiction lesbian-themed anthology, a finalist for the Golden Crown Literary Award.
- His Seed (2017). Winner for the Lambda Literary Award.
- Burly Tales (2021). An anthology of fairy-tale retellings for hirsute gay men.
- Brute (2023). An anthology of stories that address the intersectionality of masculinity, violence, and the unnatural.
- Final Curtain (2025). An anthology of horror and weird stories inspired by the Phantom of the Opera.
- Witchcraft in Your Lips (2026). An anthology of sapphic stories (including two novellas) about witches.
