= Mosaic novel =

Literary structure

A mosaic novel is a novel in which individual chapters or short stories share a common setting or set of characters with the aim of telling a linear story from beginning to end, with the individual chapters, however, refracting a plurality of viewpoints and styles.

Examples include the Wild Cards series begun by George R. R. Martin, and the Thieves' World series of Robert Lynn Asprin and others, which overtly used and may have coined the term "mosaic novel" for this practice of sharing a world and vision amongst several authors.

French author Alfred Boudry often leads groups of English- and French-speaking writers in creating multiple narratives set in a common predetermined background. La Bibliothèque nomédienne was the first to be published (in 2008), dealing about a "misplaced continent" called Nomedia. From 2009 to 2013, he and four other writers created Les Vicariants, a mosaic novel due to become a multimedia novel.

The Moonstone by Wilkie Collins is a very early example. William Faulkner's As I Lay Dying and Naguib Mahfouz's Miramar also follow the paradigm of telling a single, linear story through multiple perspectives.

== See also ==
- Chain novel
- Short story collection
