= Gaylactic Network =

Logo of the Gaylactic Network

The Gaylactic Network is a North American LGBT science fiction fandom organization. It has several affiliate chapters across the United States and Canada, with a membership of LGBT (lesbian, gay, bisexual, and transgender) people and friends, sharing an interest in science fiction, fantasy, horror, comics and role-playing games.

The Gaylactic Network oversees Gaylaxicon, an irregularly-held science fiction convention in various states. It also originated the Gaylactic Spectrum Awards, given annually for outstanding LGBT content in sci-fi, fantasy, and horror genre publications.

The Network is registered as a nonprofit organisation. Organizational records for the period 1986-2005 (bulk 1987-1991) are held by Brown University, and other universities mention it as a course resource

== Purpose ==
The Gaylactic Network state on their website that their goals includes:

- The promotion of science fiction, fantasy, and horror, and other related genres, across all media, with particular attention to works of interest to LGBT people.
- To provide forums for LGBT people and their friends to share their interest in SF/F/H.
- Highlighting the presence of LGBT elements within SF/F/H and within fandom.
- Generarating interest in SF/F/H within the LGBT communities.

This is done via their affiliate chapters on a local scale, and nationally with the organisation of Gaylaxicon and (in the past) the Gaylactic Spectrum Awards and by online activities such as E-mail lists.

== History and Affiliates ==
The Network sprang from the Boston-based Gaylaxian Science Fiction Society, an organization founded by Franklin Hummel (see Necronomicon: Providence) and assisted by John R Dumas began in 1986; Hummel was the group's first president. In 1987 Hummel then founded the Gaylactic Network (later called Gaylaxians International) as an umbrella organization for the many gay fandom clubs like the Gaylaxian Science Fiction Society that were forming locally in the United States and abroad. The organization changed from an affiliate-based membership structure to an individual-based membership structure in 2000. The Board consists of a Speaker, Listener, Treasurer, Secretary, and four Board Members.

As the original group The Gaylaxian Science Fiction Society (GSFS) is the New England–based chapter of the Network, which organized the original convention and continues to be a driving force behind many of the Gaylaxicons. The Network is also registered as a non-profit organization. Brown University maintains archives of the organization's old records, and other universities mentions it as a course resource

Since 1986, the Network has had up to 12 affiliate clubs. The affiliates are locally oriented, regionally based, autonomous clubs with their own leadership and membership. As of 2008, there are 9 affiliate chapters:

- Gaylactic Outpost Atlanta, Atlanta, Georgia
- Gaylactic Toronto Alliance, Toronto, ONT
- Golden Gate Gaylaxians, San Francisco, California
- Lambda Sci-Fi: DC Area Gaylaxians, Washington, D.C.
- Niagara Falls Gaylactic Colonizers, Niagara Falls, New York
- North Country Gaylaxians, Minneapolis, Minnesota
- Planet LAmbda, Los Angeles, California
- San Diego Queer Sci-Fi: The San Diego Gaylaxians, San Diego, California

There have been past affiliates in cities such as Philadelphia, but they have since folded or given up their affiliate status. Several organizations, including ones outside of North America, are considered "friends of the Network."

== Gaylaxicon ==
Gaylaxicon is an irregularly-held convention in the United States, often on the East Coast. The focus of the convention is science fiction, fantasy, and horror for gay men, lesbians, bisexuals. transgender people, and their friends.

The first Gaylaxicon was held in 1998 in Provincetown, Massachusetts; another in Minneapolis, Minnesota in 2009, and one Atlanta, Georgia in 2011. The 2016 is to be held again in Minneapolis, Minnesota. Attendance at the convention has varied from 90 attendees in its first year to almost 400 people in later years. Each year one or more Guests of Honour is invited, in most years this includes a science fiction author and an artist.

In addition to being the usual venue for the presentation of the Gaylactic Spectrum Awards, in the past the James Tiptree, Jr. Award has been given out at Gaylaxicon.

== Gaylactic Spectrum Awards ==
The Gaylactic Spectrum Awards are given to works of science fiction, fantasy and horror which explore LGBT (gay, lesbian, bisexual or transgender) topics in a positive way. They were founded in 1998, first presented by the Gaylactic Network in 1999, and in 2002 they were given their own organization, the Gaylactic Spectrum Awards Foundation. Each award currently consists of an etched image on lucite on a stand, using a spiral galaxy in a triangle logo, based on the logo the Gaylactic Network. The award winner's name, work title, award year and award category are etched on a small plaque on the base or on the plexiglass itself. A small cash stipend is also awarded to winners in the Best Novel and Short Fiction categories. The cost of the awards is met through individual donations and fundraising events.

Since their inception, awards have been given in categories for novels and best other work. Other categories have also been added and removed in intervening years, including categories for short fiction (since the second year) and comic books for one year. The award for best novel is the only one to have been handed out every year since the awards began. The categories are open to submission of works released during the prior calendar year in North America that includes "significant positive GLBT content". Works produced prior to the inception of the awards are eligible to be inducted into the "Hall of Fame". The results are decided by a panel of judges from the list of submitted nominees; the long list of nominees is reduced to a short list of finalists, and the results are generally announced and presented at Gaylaxicon.
