= Lethe Press =

American small press

- Founded: 2001
- Founder: Steve Berman
- Country of origin: United States
- Headquarters location: Amherst, Massachusetts
- Publication types: Books
- Fiction genres: LGBTQ literature
- Imprints: Tincture
- Official website: lethepressbooks.com

Lethe Press is an American book publishing company based in Western Massachusetts. Launched in 2001 by Steve Berman, a writer and a former employee of Giovanni's Room Bookstore in Philadelphia, Pennsylvania, the company was originally launched to publish speculative fiction, primarily LGBTQ-themed, as well as rereleasing out of print titles from other LGBTQ publishers. In recent years, with numerous LGBTQ-oriented publishing companies folding, the company has also expanded its line to include new LGBTQ-themed non-fiction, poetry, and anthology titles.

The company also Tincture, a separate imprint for LGBTQ people of color.

In 2012, The Advocate published a piece That by Berman criticizing the lack structure and organization of the Lambda Literary Awards. His criticism included the fact that while many categories have separate awards for gay men and lesbians, the award offers no transparency in its judging and maintains only a single gender-neutral category for both speculative fiction and anthologies.
