= List of Gaylactic Spectrum Award winners and nominees for best novel =

Literary award for science fiction, fantasy and horror novels with LGBT themes

The Gaylactic Spectrum Awards are given to works of science fiction, fantasy and horror that explore LGBTQ (lesbian, gay, bisexual or transgender) topics in a positive way. They were founded in 1998, first presented by the Gaylactic Network in 1999. In 2002 they were given their own organization, the Gaylactic Spectrum Awards Foundation.

Logo of the Gaylactic Spectrum Award Foundation

Since their inception, awards have been given in categories for novels, short fiction, and best other work. Other categories have also been added and removed in intervening years. Works produced before the inception of the awards are eligible to be inducted into the "Hall of Fame". The novels category is open to submissions of novels released during the prior calendar year in North America that includes "significant positive GLBT content". The results are decided by a panel of judges from the list of submitted nominees; the long list of nominees is reduced to a short list of finalists, and the results are generally announced and presented at Gaylaxicon, an annual convention devoted to LGBT-themed science fiction. This article lists all the "Best Novel" award nominees and winners and novels inducted into the Hall of Fame.

Each award consists of an etched image on lucite on a stand, using a spiral galaxy in a triangle logo, based on the logo the Gaylactic Network. The award winner's name, work title, award year, and award category are etched on a small plaque on the base or on the plexiglass itself. A small cash stipend is awarded to winners in the Best Novel category. The cost of the awards is met through individual donations and fundraising events.

Laurie J. Marks and Melissa Scott have both won the award twice. Elizabeth Bear holds the record for most nominations, with ten nominations and one win.

== Novel winners and nominees ==
In the following table, the years correspond to the year of the award ceremonies; the books were released is the preceding years. Entries with a lavender background have won the relevant award; those with a white background are the nominees on the short-list. Superscript letters after the result indicate simultaneous nominations in other categories.

Winners and joint winners
Finalists/Short-listed nominees

Year	Author(s)	Book title	Publisher	Result	Ref.
1999	Anne Harris	Accidental Creatures	Tor	Won (joint)	
1999	Stephen Leigh	Dark Water's Embrace	Avon Eos	Won (joint)	
1999	Carolyn Ives Gilman	Halfway Human	Avon Eos	Nominated	
1999	Nancy Kress	Maximum Light	Tor	Nominated	
1999	Fiona Patton	The Painter Knight	DAW Books	Nominated	
2000	Keith Hartman	The Gumshoe, the Witch, and the Virtual Corpse	Meisha Merlin	Won (joint)^{[A]}	
2000	Peg Kerr	The Wild Swans	Warner Aspect	Won (joint)	
2000	Severna Park	The Annunciate	Avon Eos	Nominated	
2000	Fiona Patton	The Granite Shield	DAW Books	Nominated	
2000	Tanya Huff	The Quartered Sea	DAW Books	Nominated	
2000	Lynn Flewelling	Traitor's Moon	Bantam Spectra	Nominated	
2001	David Gerrold	Jumping Off the Planet	Tor	Won	
2001	Michael Chabon	The Amazing Adventures of Kavalier & Clay	Random House	Nominated	
2001	Ricardo Pinto	The Chosen	Tor	Nominated	
2001	Rick Reed	The Face without a Heart	Design Image Group	Nominated	
2001	Melissa Scott	The Jazz	Tor	Nominated	
2001	Jim Grimsley	Kirith Kirin	Meisha Merlin	Nominated	
2001	Greg Egan	Teranesia	Avon Harpercollins Eos	Nominated	
2002	Hugh Nissenson	The Song of the Earth	Algonquin Books	Won	
2002	David Gerrold	Bouncing Off the Moon	Tor	Nominated	
2002	Steven Harper	Dreamer	Roc	Nominated	
2002	Liz Williams	The Ghost Sister	Bantam Spectra	Nominated	
2002	Hiromi Goto	The Kappa Child	Red Deer Press	Nominated	
2002	Jacqueline Carey	Kushiel's Dart	Tor	Nominated	
2002	Candas Jane Dorsey	A Paradigm of Earth	Tor	Nominated	
2002	Melissa Scott & Lisa A. Barnett	Point of Dreams	Tor	Nominated	
2003	Laurie J. Marks	Fire Logic	Tor	Won	
2003	Don Sakers	Dance for the Ivory Madonna	Speed-of-C	Nominated	
2003	Ellen Kushner & Delia Sherman	The Fall of the Kings	Bantam Spectra	Nominated	
2003	Robert J. Sawyer	Hominids	Tor	Nominated	
2003	Jane Fletcher	Lorimal's Chalice	Fortitude Press	Nominated	
2003	Steven Harper	Nightmare: A Novel of the Silent Empire	Roc	Nominated	
2003	Kelley Eskridge	Solitaire	Eos	Nominated	
2004	Nalo Hopkinson	The Salt Roads	Warner	Won	
2004	Lynn Flewelling	The Hidden Warrior	Bantam Spectra	Nominated	
2004	Robert J. Sawyer	Hybrids	Tor	Nominated	
2004	Geoff Ryman	Lust	St. Martin's Press	Nominated	
2004	Chris Moriarty	Spin State	Bantam Dell	Nominated	
2004	Amy Thomson	Storyteller	Ace	Nominated	
2004	Steven Harper	Trickster	Roc	Nominated	
2004	Johanna Sinisalo	Troll	Grove	Nominated	
2005	Laurie J. Marks	Earth Logic	Tor	Won	
2005	Wen Spencer	Dog Warrior	Roc	Nominated	
2005	Mark Anthony	The First Stone	Bantam Spectra	Nominated	
2005	Caitlin Kiernan	Murder of Angels	Roc	Nominated	
2005	Steven Harper	Offspring	Roc	Nominated	
2005	Jim Grimsley	The Ordinary	Tor	Nominated	
2005	Selina Rosen	Reruns	Yard Dog	Nominated	
2005	Tanya Huff	Smoke and Shadows	DAW Books	Nominated	
2006	Karin Lowachee	Cagebird	Warner Aspect	Won	
2006	Hal Bodner	Bite Club	Alyson	Nominated	
2006	James Hetley	Dragon's Eye	Ace	Nominated	
2006	Tanya Huff	Smoke and Mirrors	DAW Books	Nominated	
2006	Tim Pratt	The Strange Adventures of Rangergirl	Bantam Spectra	Nominated	
2006	Ian R. MacLeod	The Summer Isles	Aio	Nominated	
2006	Mark Gatiss	The Vesuvius Club	Scribner	Nominated	
2007	Hal Duncan	Vellum	Del Rey	Won	
2007	Elizabeth Bear	Carnival	Bantam Spectra	Nominated	
2007	James Hetley	Dragon's Teeth	Ace	Nominated	
2007	Susanne M. Beck & Okasha Skat'si	The Growing	P.D. Publishing	Nominated	
2007	Ellen Kushner	The Privilege Of The Sword	Bantam Spectra	Nominated	
2007	Tanya Huff	Smoke and Ashes	DAW Books	Nominated	
2007	Wheeler Scott	Snow	Torquere	Nominated	
2007	Chris Moriarty	Spin Control	Bantam Spectra	Nominated	
2007	Sarah Monette	The Virtu	Ace	Nominated	
2008	Ginn Hale	Wicked Gentlemen	Del Rey	Won	
2008	L-J Baker	Lady Knight	Bold Strokes Books	Nominated	
2008	Elizabeth Bear	Dust	Bantam Spectra	Nominated	
2008	Elizabeth Bear	New Amsterdam	Far Territories	Nominated	
2008	Elizabeth Bear	Whiskey and Water: A Novel of the Promethean Age	Roc	Nominated	
2008	Steve Berman	Vintage: A Ghost Story	Haworth Positronic	Nominated	
2008	Hal Duncan	Ink	Del Rey	Nominated	
2008	Sarah Hall	Daughters of the North aka The Carhullan Army	Faber & Faber	Nominated	
2008	Perry Moore	Hero	Doubleday	Nominated	
2008	Darieck Scott	Hex: A Novel of Love Spells	Carroll & Graf	Nominated	
2008	Brian Francis Slattery	Spaceman Blues: A Love Song	Tor	Nominated	
2008	Jo Walton	Ha'penny	Tor	Nominated	
2009	Elizabeth Bear	The Stratford Man (Hell and Earth/Ink and Steel)	Roc	Won	
2009	Elizabeth Bear	All the Windwracked Stars	Tor	Nominated	
2009	Cassandra Clare	City of Ashes	McElderry	Nominated	
2009	Jaida Jones & Danielle Bennett	Havemercy	Bantam Spectra	Nominated	
2009	Lynn Flewelling	Shadow's Return	Bantam Spectra	Nominated	
2009	Nicole Kimberling	Turnskin	Blind Eye Books	Nominated	
2010	Richard Morgan	The Steel Remains	Del Rey	Won	
2010	Malinda Lo	Ash	Little, Brown and Company	Nominated	
2010	Elizabeth Bear	By the Mountain Bound	Tor	Nominated	
2010	Rebecca Ore	Centuries Ago and Very Fast	Aqueduct Press	Nominated	
2010	Tanya Huff	The Enchantment Emporium	DAW Books	Nominated	
2010	Jacqueline Carey	Naamah's Kiss	Grand Central	Nominated	
2010	Catherynne Valente	Palimpsest	Del Rey	Nominated	
2010	Caitlin Kiernan	The Red Tree	Roc	Nominated	
2010	Elizabeth Bear	Seven for a Secret	Subterranean Press	Nominated	
2010	Josh Lanyon	Strange Fortune	Blind Eye	Nominated	
2011	Kathe Koja	Under the Poppy	Small Beer Press	Won	
2011	J.A. Pitts	Black Blade Blues	Tor	Nominated	
2011	David Pratt	Bob the Book	Chelsea Street Editions	Nominated	
2011	Gemma Files	A Book of Tongues	ChiZine Publications	Nominated	
2011	Jim C. Hines	Red Hood's Revenge	DAW Books	Nominated	
2011	Jo Graham	Stealing Fire	Orbit	Nominated	
2011	Lynn Flewelling	The White Road	Bantam Spectra	Nominated	
2011	Jameson Currier	The Wolf at the Door	Chelsea Street Editions	Nominated	
2012	J.A. Pitts	Honeyed Words	Tor	Won	
2012	Richard K. Morgan	The Cold Commands	Del Rey	Nominated	
2012	Kameron Hurley	God's War/Infidel	Night Shade	Nominated	
2012	Elizabeth Bear	Grail	Bantam Spectra	Nominated	
2012	Joan Slonczewski	The Highest Frontier	Tor	Nominated	
2012	Malinda Lo	Huntress	Little, Brown and Company	Nominated	
2012	Gemma Files	A Rope of Thorns	ChiZine Publications	Nominated	
2012	Charles Stross	Rule 34	Ace	Nominated	
2012	L.A. Witt	Static	Amber Quill Press	Nominated	
2012	Tanya Huff	The Wild Ways	DAW Books	Nominated	
2013	Madeline Miller	The Song of Achilles	Ecco Press	Won	
2013	Lynn Flewelling	Casket of Souls	Bantam Spectra	Nominated	
2013	J.A. Pitts	Forged in Fire	Tor	Nominated	
2013	Melissa Scott	Point of Knives	Lethe Press	Nominated	
2013	Kameron Hurley	Rapture	Night Shade Books	Nominated	
2014^{[B]}	Melissa Scott & Amy Griswold	Death By Silver	Lethe Press	Won	
2014	Jill Schultz	Angel on the Ropes	Self-published	Nominated	
2014	Kathleen Tierney	Blood Oranges	Roc Books	Nominated	
2014	Lou Harper	Dead in the Desert	Harper Books	Nominated	
2014	Ginn Hale	The Holy Road/His Sacred Bones	Blind Eye Books	Nominated	
2014	Seanan McGuire	Indexing	47North	Nominated	
2014	Jess Faraday	The Left Hand of Justice	Bold Strokes Books	Nominated	
2014	KJ Charles	The Magpie Lord	Samhain Publishing	Nominated	
2014	Ian Tregillis	Something More Than Night	Tor Books	Nominated	
2014	Alaya Dawn Johnson	The Summer Prince	Arthur A. Levine Books	Nominated	
2014	Lavie Tidhar	The Violent Century	Hodder & Stoughton	Nominated	
2014	Jordan L. Hawk	Widdershins / Threshold / Stormhaven	Self-published	Nominated	
2015^{[B]}	Melissa Scott	Fairs' Point	Lethe Press	Won	
2015	KJ Charles	A Case of Possession / Flight of Magpies	Samhain Publishing	Nominated	
2015	Richard K. Morgan	The Dark Defiles	Del Rey Books	Nominated	
2015	Heather Rose Jones	Daughter of Mystery	Bella Books	Nominated	
2015	Melissa Scott & Amy Griswold	A Death at the Dionysus Club	Lethe Press	Nominated	
2015	Tanya Huff	The Future Falls	DAW	Nominated	
2015	Tim Pratt	Heirs of Grace	47North	Nominated	
2015	Lisa Henry & Heidi Bellau	King of Dublin	Riptide Publishing	Nominated	
2015	Kathe Koja	The Mercury Waltz	Roadswell Editions	Nominated	
2015	Jordan L. Hawk	Necropolis / Bloodline	Widdershins Press	Nominated	
2015	Kathleen Tierney	Red Delicious	Penguin Books	Nominated	
2015	James L. Sutter	Pathfinder Tales: The Redemption Engine	Paizo Publishing	Nominated	
2015	Lynn Flewelling	Shards of Time	Del Rey Books	Nominated	
2015	Melissa Scott & Jo Graham	Wind Raker	Crossroad Press	Nominated	
2016	Ian McDonald	Luna: New Moon	Tor Books	Won	
2016	Kathe Koja	The Bastards' Paradise	Roadswell Editions	Nominated	
2016	Kelly Jensen & Jenn Burke	Chaos Station	Carina Press	Nominated	
2016	Kathleen Tierney	Cherry Bomb	Roc/Penguin	Nominated	
2016	JoSelle Vanderhooft	Ebenezer	Zumaya Boundless	Nominated	
2016	Elizabeth Bear	Karen Memory	Tor Books	Nominated	
2016	Jo Walton	My Real Children	Tor Books	Nominated	
2016	Heather Rose Jones	The Mystic Marriage	Bella Books	Nominated	
2016	Emma Newman	Planetfall	Ace/Roc	Nominated	
2016	Natasha Pulley	The Watchmaker of Filigree Street	Bloomsbury	Nominated	
2017	Heather Rose Jones	Mother of Souls	Bella Books	Won	
2017	Julie Mayhew	The Big Lie	Candlewick Press	Nominated	
2017	Don Bassingthwaite	Cocktails at Seven, Apocalypse at Eight: The Derby Cavendish Stories	ChiZine Publications	Nominated	
2017	Jordan L. Hawke	Fallow	Widdershins Press	Nominated	
2017	Jordan L. Hawke	Hexbreaker / Hexmaker	Widdershins Press	Nominated	
2017	Michael Thomas Ford	Lily	Lethe Press	Nominated	
2017	Kirby Crow	Malachite	Bonecamp Press	Nominated	
2017	Ginn Hale	Maze-Born Trouble	Blind Eye Books	Nominated	
2017	J.A. Pitt	Night Terrors	WordFire Press	Nominated	
2018	Ellen Klages	Passing Strange	Tor.com	Won	
2018	Cynthia Ward	The Adventures of the Incognita Countess	Aqueduct Press	Nominated	
2018	Lara Elena Donnelly	Amberlough	Tor Books	Nominated	
2018	J.Y. Yang	The Black Tides of Heaven	Tor.com	Nominated	
2018	Mark Allan Gunnells	The Cult of Ocasta	Evil Jester Press	Nominated	
2018	Maggie Shen King	An Excess Male	Harper Voyager	Nominated	
2018	Jordan L. Hawk	Hexslayer	JLH Publishing	Nominated	
2018	F.T. Lukens	The Rules and Regulations for Mediating Myths & Magic	Duet Imprint / Interlude Press	Nominated	
2018	Ellen Kushner et al.	Tremontaine Season 1	Serial Box/Saga Press	Nominated	
2018	Rivers Solomon	An Unkindness of Ghosts	Akashic Books	Nominated	

^{A} Also won the People's Choice Award.

^{B} The awards for 2014 and 2015 were combined into a single ceremony and presented in 2015

== Hall of Fame novels ==
In the following table, the years correspond to the year of the award ceremonies; the books were all first published before the founding of the awards in 1998. No novels have been inducted into the Hall of Fame since 2003. Entries in bold and with a lavender background were inducted into the Hall of Fame that year; those that are neither highlighted nor in bold were not inducted that year (NI), but may be inducted later (IL). Superscript letters after the result indicate simultaneous nominations in other categories.

Inductees
Non-inductees (that year)

Year	Author(s)	Book title	Publisher	Result	Ref.
1999	Maureen McHugh	China Mountain Zhang	Tor	Inducted	
1999	Lawrence Schimel	Drag Queen of Elfland	Ultra Violet	NI	
1999	Toby Johnson	Secret Matter	Peregrine Ventures	NI	
1999	Melissa Scott	Shadow Man	Tor	NI - IL^{[A]}	
2000	Nicola Griffith	Slow River	Del Rey	Inducted	
2000	Ellen Kushner	Swordspoint	Tor	Inducted	
2000	Thomas Burnett Swann	How Are The Mighty Fallen	DAW Books	NI	
2000	Diane Duane	Tale of the Five series aka The Middle Kingdoms	Tor	NI - IL	
2001	Arthur C. Clarke	Imperial Earth	Orion	Inducted	
2001	Mary Doria Russell	The Sparrow & Children of God	Fawcett	Inducted	
2001	Francesca Lia Block	Dangerous Angels aka The Weetzie Bat books	HarperCollins	Inducted	
2001	Tanya Huff	The Blood books	DAW Books	NI	
2001	Marion Zimmer Bradley	The Darkover books	DAW Books	NI	
2001	Ursula Le Guin	The Left Hand of Darkness	Ace	NI - IL	
2002	Samuel R. Delany	Dhalgren	Bantam Books	Inducted	
2002	Joanna Russ	The Female Man	Bantam Books	Inducted	
2002	Geoff Ryman	Was	HarperCollins	Inducted	
2003	Suzy McKee Charnas	The Holdfast Chronicles	Ballantine / Tor	Inducted	
2003	Ursula Le Guin	The Left Hand of Darkness	Ace	Inducted	
2003	Melissa Scott	Shadow Man	Tor	Inducted	
2003	Diane Duane	Tale of the Five series aka The Middle Kingdoms	Tor	Inducted	

^{A} Also won the People's Choice Award.

== See also ==
- LGBT themes in speculative fiction
- Lambda Literary Award for Speculative Fiction
- List of Gaylactic Spectrum Award winners and nominees for best short fiction
- List of Gaylactic Spectrum Award winners and nominees for best other work
