= Don Sakers =

American writer (1958–2021)

- Born: June 16, 1958; Yokosuka, Japan
- Died: May 17, 2021 (aged 62); Maryland, United States
- Occupation: Writer
- Notable work: Dance for the Ivory Madonna

Don Sakers (June 16, 1958 – May 17, 2021) was an American science fiction writer and fan who lived in Maryland, and wrote several novels and edited a short story collection. In 2009 he succeeded Thomas Easton as book reviewer for Analog Science Fiction and Fact magazine. Sakers is probably best known in the science fiction community as a frequent guest speaker at science fiction conventions.

When asked about the reaction to the diversity elements in his SF, Sakers said:

By and large, it seems to me that most SF fans are fairly comfortable with diversity. Part of this, I feel, comes from the common experience of being thought "weird" by the general populace.... Another reason that fans seem comfortable with diversity stems from the nature of Science Fiction itself. SF is often concerned with "the other" -- the alien being, the time traveler, the citizen of a totally different society. After you've wrapped your mind around the concept of falling in love with a silicon-based insectoid creature whose society is based on ritual cannibalism, a friendly chat with the black lesbian sitting next to you is easy to handle.

— Don Sakers

== Writing career and SF fandom ==
Sakers was the author of SF novels Dance for the Ivory Madonna (2002) and companion titles The Leaves of October (1988), A Voice in Every Wind (2003), Weaving the Web of Days (2004), and A Rose From Old Terra (2007); and dark fantasy novel Curse of the Zwilling (2003). He was also author of the short story "The Cold Solution" (Analog, 1991) and other short fiction. Sakers was editor of Carmen Miranda's Ghost Is Haunting Space Station Three (1990), an anthology of stories based on Leslie Fish's song of the same name; the SF Book of Days (2004); and the Gaylaxicon 2006 Sampler. Sakers was also the author of two gay young adult novels: Act Well Your Part (1986) and Lucky in Love (1988). Melissa Scott called him "a left wing Heinlein."

A member of the Science Fiction and Fantasy Writers of America, he wrote numerous obituaries for their web site, including that of Lisa A. Barnett.

=== Dance for the Ivory Madonna ===
According to a Publishers Weekly review, Dance for the Ivory Madonna is about when;

it's 2042, and the U.S. has split into three nations; special interest groups have their own House in Congress; artificial intelligence has kicked humans out of cyberspace; and the African continent, a hotbed of technological advancement, is united under a contract government called Umoja. Making his way through this brave new world is a young African-American operative of a secret organization whose task is to avenge his father's murder and save humankind.

— Publishers Weekly review

Sakers described the book as being about "a lot of things: friendship, toleration, a celebration of the creative spirit, a paean to unconventionality. It's about what's wrong with today's world, what's right with today's world, and what hope there is for the future. It's about how our technology affects us, and about the decisions we can make regarding those effects."

Dance for the Ivory Madonna was a Spectrum Award finalist.

=== Science fiction conventions ===
Sakers was guest of honor at the 1995 Gaylaxicon, and was a frequent guest speaker at other Gaylaxicons, Albacon, Arisia, and Boskone.

== Personal life ==
Sakers was born in Yokosuka, Japan, but grew up in the United States. He was openly gay and had diabetes and autism. He shared a home in Anne Arundel County, Maryland with his spouse, costumer Thomas Atkinson. Their house, known as Meerkat Meade, was featured in Weird Maryland. His self-described "day job" was with the Anne Arundel County public library, where he worked for 42 years. Sakers was an active blogger.

Sakers died of a heart attack on May 17, 2021, aged 62.

== Bibliography ==
=== Novels ===
Scattered Worlds Mosaic

1. Dance for the Ivory Madonna.
2. Weaving the Web of Days.
3. The Eighth Succession.
4. Children of the Eighth Day.
5. All Roads Lead to Terra (e-book).
6. A Voice in Every Wind. (Note: A collection of two short stories.)
7. A Rose From Old Terra.
8. The Leaves of October (started as a short story in August 1983's Analog, and was expanded as a novel in 1988)

=== Short fiction ===
Collections

- Meat and machine. Speed of C Productions. 2014. (Note: Includes some non-fiction pieces.)

=== Other ===
Collections

- Scott, Melissa; Sakers, Don, eds. (November 6, 2013). Jaelle Her Book: A Memorial. Speed-of-c Productions. p. 164. ISBN 978-1934754146. Stories and essays by guest authors at the annual Darkover Grand Council (Darkovercon), in memory of Judy Gerjuoy (aka Jaelle of Armida) and Darkovercon.
