= KJ Charles =

Romance writer

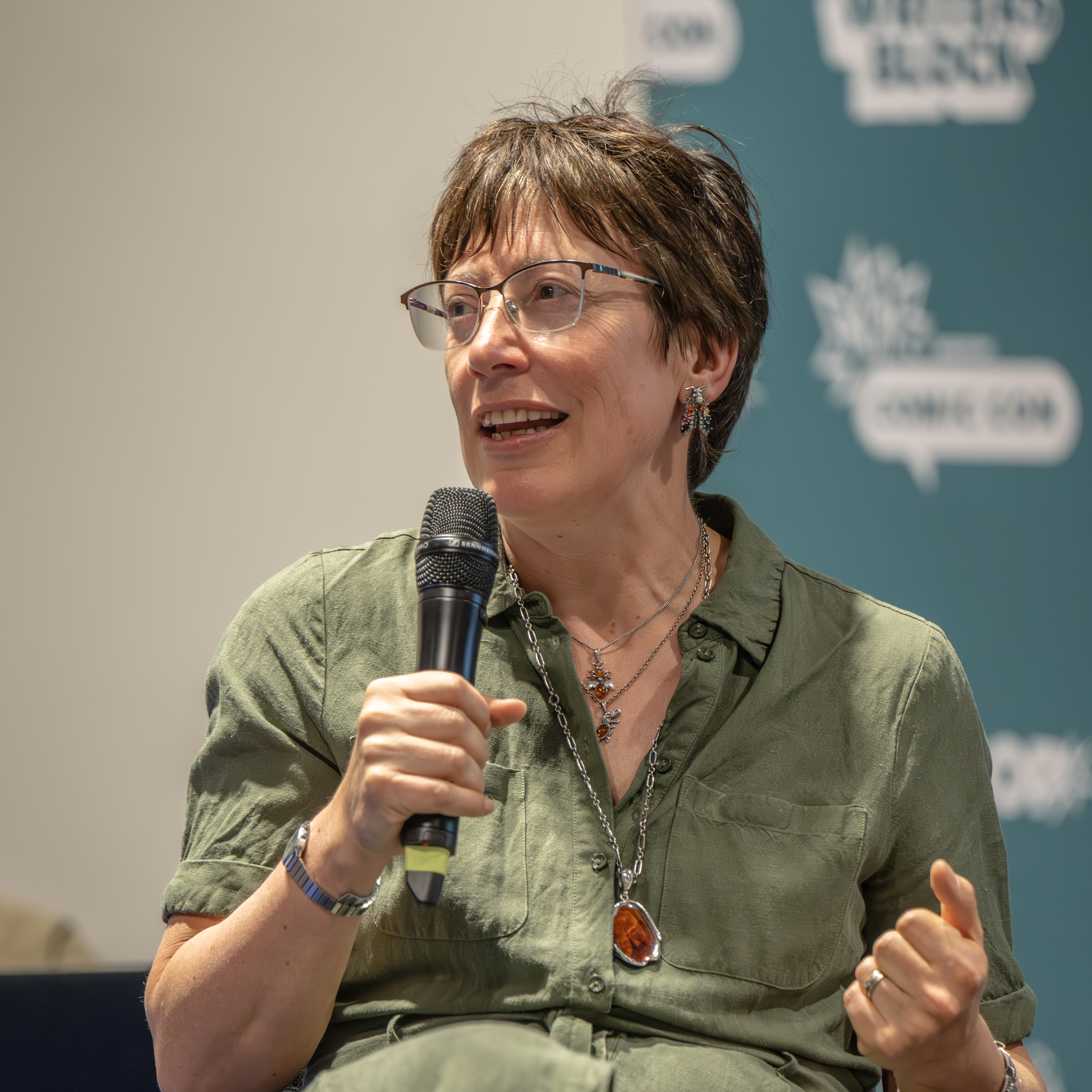
- At MCM London Comic Con, 22 May 2026
- Other name: K.J. Charles
- Years active: 2013–present
- Website: kjcharleswriter.com

KJ Charles is a British author of historical and fantasy romance. She has authored over 30 novels, mostly M/M romances set in nineteenth- and early twentieth-century England, beginning with The Magpie Lord (2013). Her work has received a number of accolades, including nominations for a RITA Award and a Lambda Literary Award.

== Career ==
Charles worked in publishing for over twenty years, including a stint at Mills & Boon. She began her writing career as a self-publisher. Despite the challenges that come with self-publishing, she felt it would allow her more creative freedom and ability to publish on her own schedule. In addition, at the time, she knew major publishers were unlikely to pick up the kinds of M/M romances she wanted to write.

Charles published her debut novel The Magpie Lord in 2013, the first in her A Charm of Magpies Victorian-set fantasy trilogy. The Magpie Lord was nominated for the 2014 Gaylactic Spectrum Award for Best Novel. The second and third novels in the trilogy were A Case of Possession and Flight of Magpies in 2014. Charles would expand on her A Charm of Magpies world with further works set in the same universe, including Jackdaw (2015) and Rag and Bone (2016). Also in 2014, Charles published another novel Think of England, set in the early 20th-century. Both A Case of Possession and Think of England won 2014 Rainbow Awards in the Fantasy Romance and Historical Romance categories. Think of England would later be followed up by a prequel Proper English in 2019, plus the Will Darling Adventures series in 2020, which consisted of Slippery Creatures, The Sugared Game, and Subtle Blood.

In 2015, Charles published The Secret Casebook of Simon Feximal, described as a fantasy "pastiche/tribute" of Sherlock Holmes, and began her London Sequence with the Society of Gentlemen trilogy, consisting of A Fashionable Indulgence, A Seditious Affair, and A Gentleman's Position. A Seditious Affair was a runner-up to Nalini Singh's Shards of Hope for Best Romance on the All About Romance Reader Poll. Charles' 2017 novel Spectred Isle takes place in the same universe as The Secret Casebook of Simon Feximal in the aftermath of World War I and introduces the "Green Men", while her 2017 Sins of the Cities trilogy is the next in the London Sequence. Spectred Isle was a finalist for the 2018 RITA Award for Paranormal Romance. Also published in 2017 and 2018 were the Jonathan'verse series, including Wanted, A Gentleman, Band Sinister, and the novella Unfit to Print, and the standalones The Price of Meat and The Henchmen of Zenda. In her column for The Washington Post, Sarah MacLean named Wanted, A Gentleman one of the top 5 romance novels of the year. Next in the London Sequence came Charles' The Lilywhite Boys trilogy of Any Old Diamonds and Gilded Cage in 2019 and Masters in This Hall in 2022, in addition to prequel The Rat Catcher and an epilogue short story, [Lily] White Wedding.

Charles initially self-published The Gentle Art of Fortune Hunting in 2021 before it was picked up by Orion Publishing Group. The novel became part of the loosely-connected Gentlemen of an Uncertain Fortune books, followed by A Thief in the Night and The Duke at Hazard.

Both The Secret Lives of Country Gentleman and A Nobleman's Guide to Seducing a Scoundrel, part of the Doomsday series, were published in 2023. Set in Romney Marsh, the character Gareth is based on parson-naturalist Gilbert White. The second novel takes place 13 years after the first. The Secret Lives of Country Gentlemen was nominated for the 2024 Lambda Literary Award for Gay Romance. It was also a Library Journal Best Romance Book of 2023. A Nobleman's Guide to Seducing a Scoundrel was a September 2023 LibraryReads pick and shortlisted for a Libby Book Award.

Charles signed a single book deal with Storm Publishing in 2023 for Come to Dust and a three-book deal with Tor Books in 2025, starting with How to Fake it in Society, released in April 2026.

== Influences ==
Charles' influences include Georgette Heyer, Charles Dickens, TS Eliot, Beverly Jenkins, and Terry Pratchett. She has mentioned reading the works of Rozina Visram, David Olusoga and Rictor Norton in her historical research. While Charles' novels tend to centre the romance, they also overlap in genre with historical fiction, fantasy, and mystery.

== Personal life ==
Charles lives in London with her husband. They have two children.

== Bibliography ==
=== A Charm of Magpies ===
- The Magpie Lord (2013)
- A Case of Possession (2014)
- Flight of Magpies (2014)

==== Shorts ====
- "The Smuggler and the Warlord" (2013) (0.5)
- "Interlude with Tattoos" (2013) (1.5)
- "A Case of Spirits" (2015) (2.5)
- "Feast of Stephen" (2014) (3.5)
- "Five for Heaven" (2019) (3.6)

==== The Charm of Magpies World ====
- Jackdaw (2015)
- "A Queer Trade" (2016) (novelette, Rag and Bone 0.5)
- Rag and Bone (2016)

=== England World ===
- Think of England (2014)
- Proper English (2019) (prequel)

==== The Will Darling Adventures ====
- Slippery Creatures (2020)
- The Sugared Game (2020)
- Subtle Blood (2021)

==== Shorts ====
- "Song for a Viking" (Think of England epilogue)
- "To Trust Man on his Oath" (Will Darling 2.5)
- "How Goes the World?" (England 2.5/Will Darling 3.5)

=== Simon Feximal / Green Men World ===
- The Secret Casebook of Simon Feximal (2015)
- Spectred Isle (2017)
- Last Couple in Hell

=== London Sequence ===
==== Society of Gentlemen ====
- A Fashionable Indulgence (2015)
- A Seditious Affair (2015)
- A Gentleman’s Position (2016)

==== Society shorts ====
- The Ruin of Gabriel Ashleigh (2015) (0.5)
- "A Confidential Problem" (2016) (2.5)
- "A Private Miscellany" (2016) (3.5)

==== Sins of the Cities ====
- An Unseen Attraction (2017)
- An Unnatural Vice (2017)
- An Unsuitable Heir (2017)

==== The Lilywhite Boys ====
- Any Old Diamonds (2019)
- Gilded Cage (2019)
- Masters in this Hall (2022)

==== Lilywhite extras ====
- The Ratcatcher's Daughter (2019) (prequel)
- (Lily) White Wedding (2023)

=== Jonathan'verse ===
- Wanted, A Gentleman (2017)
  - "Wanted, an Author"
- Band Sinister (2018)
- Unfit to Print (2018)

=== Gentlemen of an Uncertain Fortune ===
- The Gentle Art of Fortune Hunting (2021)
- A Thief in the Night (2022)
  - "A Rose by Any Name" (2023) (epilogue)
- The Duke at Hazard (2024)

=== The Doomsday Books ===
- The Secret Lives of Country Gentlemen (2023)
  - "If He Had His Legs We'd be in so Much Trouble"
- A Nobleman's Guide to Seducing a Scoundrel (2023)

=== Standalones ===
- The Price of Meat (2017)
- The Henchmen of Zenda (2018)
- Death in the Spires (2024)
- Copper Script (2025)
- All of Us Murderers (2025)
- Come to Dust
- How to Fake it in Society (2026)

=== Contemporary novels ===
- Non-Stop Till Tokyo (2014)

== Accolades ==
Year	Award	Category	Title	Result	Ref
2014	Gaylactic Spectrum Awards	Best Novel	The Magpie Lord	Shortlisted	
2014	Rainbow Awards	Best Gay Fantasy Romance	A Case of Possession	Won	
2014	Rainbow Awards	Best Gay Historical Romance	Think of England	Won	
2015	Gaylactic Spectrum Awards	Best Novel	A Case of Possession / Flight of Magpies	Shortlisted	
2015	Rainbow Awards	Best Gay Paranormal Romance	The Secret Casebook of Simon Feximal	Won	
2015	Rainbow Awards	Best Gay Historical Romance	A Fashionable Indulgence	Shortlisted	
2016	Rainbow Awards	Best Gay Fantasy Romance	Rag and Bone	Shortlisted	
2016	All About Romance Reader Poll	Best Romance	A Seditious Affair	Runner-up	
2018	RITA Award	Paranormal Romance	Spectred Isle	Shortlisted	
2021	New York Public Library Best Books of 2021		The Gentle Art of Fortune Hunting	Listed	
2024	Libby Book Awards	Best Romance Book of the Year	A Nobleman's Guide to Seducing a Scoundrel	Shortlisted	
2024	Lambda Literary Awards	Gay Romance	The Secret Lives of Country Gentlemen	Shortlisted	
