= Planetfall (disambiguation) =

Planetfall may refer to:

- Planetfall, a 1983 video game
- Planetfall (novel), a 2015 novel by Emma Newman, and the first in the series of novels of the same name
- Age of Wonders: Planetfall, a 2019 video game
- "Planet Fall", the seventh episode of My Dad the Bounty Hunter
- Planetfall, a game engine used by multiplayer game Rise: The Vieneo Province
