= Natasha Pulley =

British author (born 1988)

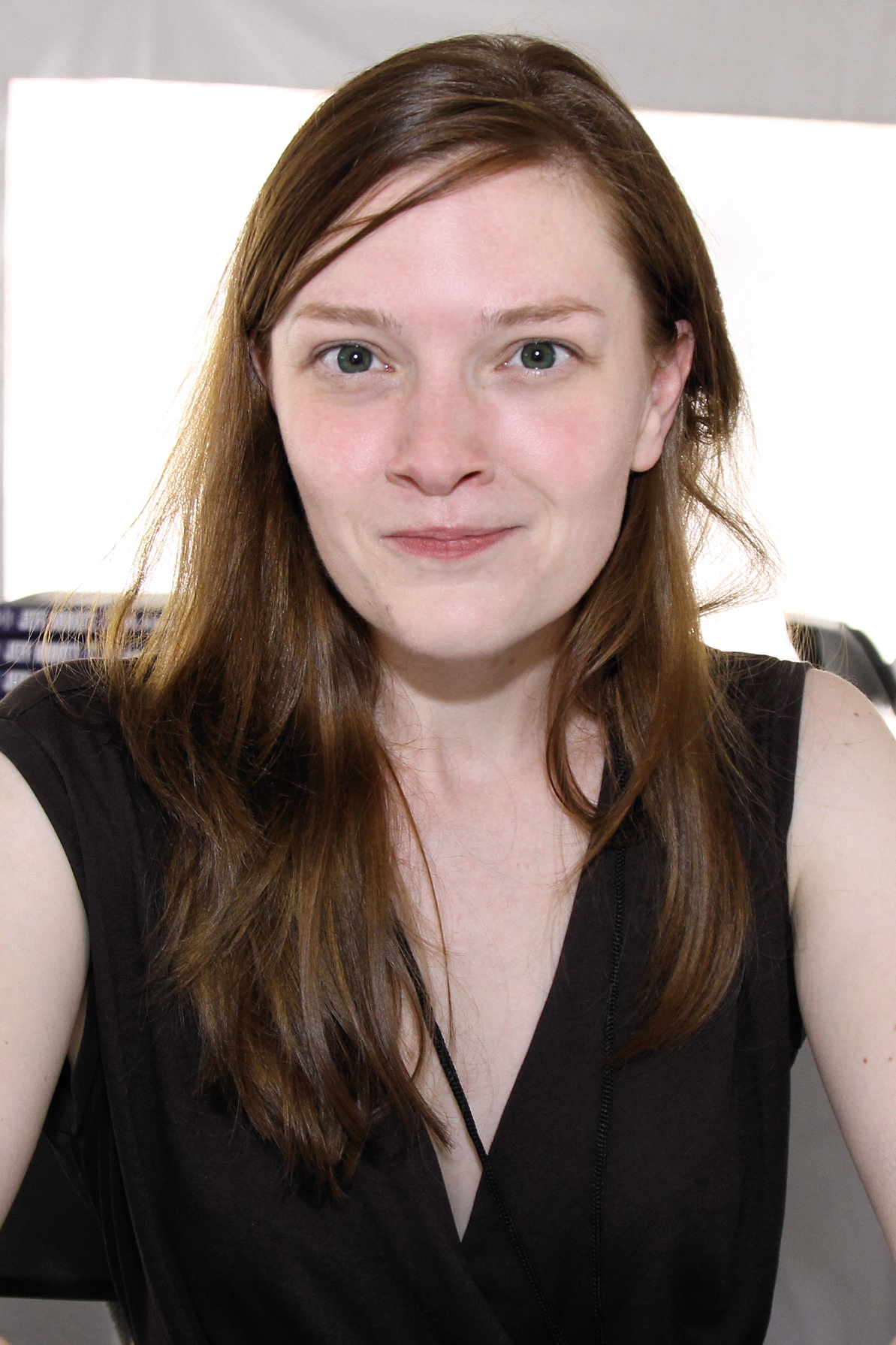
- Pulley at the 2017 Texas Book Festival
- Born: Natasha Katherine Pulley; 4 December 1988 (age 37); Cambridge, England
- Education: New College, Oxford; University of East Anglia
- Occupation: Author
- Writing career
- Notable work: The Watchmaker of Filigree Street (2015)
- Notable awards: 2016 Betty Trask Award

Natasha Katherine Pulley (born 4 December 1988) is a British author. She is best known for her debut novel, The Watchmaker of Filigree Street, which won a Betty Trask Award.

Pulley has also been an associate lecturer in creative writing at Bath Spa University, a visiting lecturer at City, University of London, and a tutor in the University of Cambridge's Institute of Continuing Education (ICE).

== Early life and education ==
Pulley was born in Cambridge and educated at Soham Village College. She graduated with a Bachelor of Arts (BA) in English from New College, Oxford and then a Master of Arts (MA) in Creative Writing (Prose Fiction) from the University of East Anglia in 2012. She also earned a scholarship to study abroad in Tokyo for a year.

== Works ==
Her debut novel, The Watchmaker of Filigree Street, was published in 2015 and was set in Victorian London. It won a 2016 Betty Trask Award. Her second novel, The Bedlam Stacks, was published in 2017, and her third, The Lost Future of Pepperharrow, was released in the UK in 2019. All three are set in the same fictional universe.

Pulley's fourth book, an alternative history titled The Kingdoms, was released in May 2021, followed by her fifth book, The Half Life of Valery K, in June 2022, then her sixth book, The Mars House, on 19 March 2024, and her seventh book, The Hymn to Dionysus, on 18 March 2025. On 18 August 2026, she published her eighth book, The Salt King.

== Awards ==
Ref:

Year	Title	Award	Category	Result	Ref
2015	The Watchmaker of Filigree Street	Waverton Good Read Award	—	Longlisted	
2016	The Watchmaker of Filigree Street	Authors' Club First Novel Award	—	Shortlisted	
2016	The Watchmaker of Filigree Street	Betty Trask Prize and Awards	Betty Trask Award	Won	
2016	The Watchmaker of Filigree Street	Crawford Award	—	Shortlisted	
2016	The Watchmaker of Filigree Street	Gaylactic Spectrum Award	Novel	Shortlisted	
2016	The Watchmaker of Filigree Street	Locus Award	First Novel	Nominated—5th	
2017	The Bedlam Stacks	Books Are My Bag Readers' Awards	Fiction	Shortlisted	
2018	The Bedlam Stacks	Encore Award	—	Shortlisted	
2018	The Bedlam Stacks	Walter Scott Prize	—	Longlisted	
2019	The Bedlam Stacks	International Dublin Literary Award	—	Longlisted	
2020	The Lost Future of Pepperharrow	Kitschies	Red Tentacle (Novel)	Shortlisted	
2021	The Kingdoms	Sidewise Award	Long Form	Shortlisted	
2022	The Kingdoms	HWA Awards	Gold Crown	Shortlisted	
2023	The Half Life of Valerie K	Wilbur Smith Adventure Writing Prize	Published Novel	Shortlisted	
2024	The Mars House	Climate Fiction Prize	—	Longlisted	

== Bibliography ==
=== Watchmaker ===
- —— (2015). The Watchmaker of Filigree Street (hardcover ed.). Bloomsbury Circus. pp. 1–325. ISBN 9781408854280.
- —— (2017). The Bedlam Stacks (hardcover ed.). Bloomsbury UK. pp. 1–337. ISBN 9781408878446.
- —— (2020). The Lost Future of Pepperharrow (paperback ed.). Bloomsbury Circus. pp. 1–512. ISBN 9781408885185.

=== Other novels ===
- —— (2021). The Kingdoms (hardcover ed.). Bloomsbury Publishing. pp. 1–448. ISBN 9781635576085.
- —— (2022). The Half Life of Valery K (hardcover ed.). Bloomsbury Publishing. pp. 1–384. ISBN 9781635573275.
- —— (2024). The Mars House (hardcover ed.). Bloomsbury Publishing. pp. 1–480. ISBN 9781639732333.
- —— (2025). The Hymn to Dionysus (hardcover ed.). Bloomsbury Publishing. pp. 1–416. ISBN 9781639732364.

=== Collections ===
- ——; Macneal, Elizabeth; Hurley, Andrew; et al. (et al) (2021). The Haunting Season: Ghostly Tales for Long Winter Nights (hardcover ed.). Pegasus Crime. pp. 1–336. ISBN 9781643137971.
- ——; Macneal, Elizabeth; Hurley, Andrew; et al. (et al) (2023). The Winter Spirits: Twelve Ghostly Tales for Festive Nights. Little, Brown UK.
