= The Kingdom of Kevin Malone =

Novel by Suzy McKee Charnas

- First edition
- Author: Suzy McKee Charnas
- Cover artist: Michael Hussar
- Language: English
- Genre: Fantasy literature
- Publisher: Harcourt Brace Jovanovich
- Publication date: 1993
- Publication place: United States
- Pages: 211
- ISBN: 0-15-200756-3

The Kingdom of Kevin Malone is a 1993 fantasy novel by American author Suzy McKee Charnas. The novel narrates a story of a boy who creates an imaginary world called Fayre Farre to escape his abusive father.

== Plot ==
Kevin Malone has a troubled childhood with history of abuses by his father. To escape the miseries of his real life, he creates a fantasy world called "Fayre Farre" in which he is "The Promised Champion", the hero of the world. Amy, a fourteen-year-old girl, enters this fantasy world one day while she is roller-skating at New York's Central Park. Amy has been running away from her own real-life problems. She has lost her cousin Shelly, and Amy's father wants the family to relocate to Los Angeles as he wants to pursue a career in Hollywood. The anticipation of losing her best friends by moving away depresses Amy. She accidentally enters the make-believe world of Kevin, her neighbor who used to bully her in the past.

In Fayre Farre, The Promised Champion is losing his supremacy, as the evil "White Warrior Anglower" expands his armies to gain control over the kingdom. Through a series of adventures, Kevin wins over the White Warrior Anglower, taking help from Amy and her friends. At the end, Anglower is shown as the reincarnation of Kevin's father and Amy accepts the death of her cousin.

== Development ==
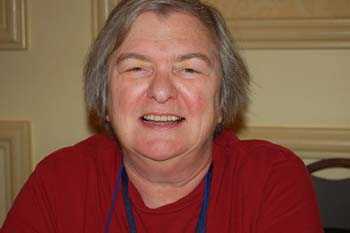
Author Suzy McKee Charnas in 2006

The book is set in New York, where Charnas was born. She later moved to Albuquerque, New Mexico, but decided to plot the book in New York in response to people who would express their sympathy about her growing up in Manhattan and "to write about the reality of growing up in a place of physical freedom, thrilling unpredictability, and a enormous, nourishing energy". The book is based on Charnas' experience of being bullied as a child.

== Publishing history ==
The original hardcover edition was published by Harcourt Brace Jovanovich and illustrated by artist Michael Hussar. An electronic version was released in June 2001 by ElectricStory.com.

== Reception ==
Hazel Davis for The Assembly on Literature for Adolescents appreciated the work of Charnas to combine the real-life problem of child abuse, losing friends, and grieving death with the fantasy elements of monsters, prophesies, magic, and violence. Kirkus Reviews called it an "engrossing story" for the proper mix of real and unreal worlds.

In 1994 the novel won the Mythopoeic Society Award in the Children's Literature category. The award "honors books for beginning readers to age thirteen, in the tradition of The Hobbit or The Chronicles of Narnia".
