= Before Mars (novel) =

2018 novel by Emma Newman

- First edition cover
- Author: Emma Newman
- Cover artist: Anxo Amarelle
- Language: English
- Series: Planetfall #3
- Genre: Science fiction
- Publisher: Ace Books
- Publication date: April 17, 2018
- Publication place: United States
- Media type: Paperback original
- Pages: 340 pp
- ISBN: 9780399587320
- OCLC: 995129319
- Dewey Decimal: 823/.92—dc23
- LC Class: PR6114.E949B44 2018
- Preceded by: After Atlas
- Followed by: Atlas Alone

Before Mars is a 2018 science fiction novel by British writer Emma Newman. It was first published in the United States as a paperback original in April 2018 by Ace Books, and in the United Kingdom by Gollancz. An audiobook was published in April 2018 in the United States by Tantor Audio, and in the United Kingdom by Orion Publishing.

Before Mars is the third book in Newman's four-book Planetfall series, and takes place on Mars during the same period as the events on Earth in the previous book, After Atlas. Before Mars concerns Dr. Anna Kubrin, a geologist and artist, who has been sent to the planet to paint Martian landscapes. The novel was a finalist for the 2018 BSFA Award for Best Novel.

== Background ==
In an interview with Space.com, Newman said she wanted Before Mars to be a "psychological thriller". She wanted to address the subject of memory, how people process it, and how it affects their perceptions of reality and mental illness. Newman said she also wanted to investigate how people in the future would react to being able to record and playback in memory everything they see, hear and feel via a "cam lens" and neural implants. She asked, "does that affect how much you process reality [and how] you process memory?"

In an interview with Syfy Wire, Newman described the groundwork she had done for the book: "I did a lot of research on Mars itself, on traveling to it, and on geology and the survival challenges posed by living on [the planet]". She added that because the story takes place some 80 years into the future, "I had a little leeway in terms of the spacecraft technology." On the subject of gov-corps that feature in her Planetfall books, Newman said she envisages a future where huge corporations control governments and monitor their citizens via neural implants. She added that the prospect of gov-corps becoming a reality is not quite so far-fetched. "This is the future I foresee if we continue as we are, with no change in political structures and no change in the ideologies of the most powerful political factions."

== Reception ==
Writing at Den of Geek, Megan Crouse called Before Mars "a thrilling science fiction mystery, a societal critique, and a character study". She said Newman treats Anna with "careful attention". Her flashbacks "work well" in revealing just enough to create suspense, and the story's first-person point-of-view fills it with "claustrophobia and anxiety". Anna's difficult marriage is sensitively handled, and reminded Crouse of the marriage of convenience in Sheri S. Tepper's 1989 science fiction novel, Grass. Newman's other characters are all seen through Anna's limited perspective, and while none are "poorly drawn", they are not as well developed as the protagonist. Crouse concluded that while Before Mars "works on many levels", she felt that not all the issues raised are full addressed and the "ending slumps".

In a review for Locus, Adrienne Martini wrote that in Before Mars Newman builds on her Planetfall universe with its corporation-controlled governments and their citizen-monitoring via implanted chips. She remarked that Newman's narrative can be unsettling, leaving the reader "a little removed from the action", which gives the impression that her characters are wrapped in "a thin layer of gauze". Yet, Martini added, "it still works somehow". What she did feel "doesn't work as well" are the reams of backstory, which tend to "bog the story down". She said some of Anna's musings "read like therapy sessions". But overall, Martini concluded that "there's more enjoyable and intriguing moments in Before Mars than not".

Liz Bourke described Before Mars as "a tight and claustrophobic psychological thriller of a novel". In a review of the book at Tor.com she wrote that as in the two previous Planetfall novels, the protagonist is an outsider who does not fit in and feels alienated. Anna feels "trapped by society", "trapped in her marriage" and "trapped ... on Mars", leaving her "isolated either by madness or conspiracy". Bourke felt that readers of After Atlas may not experience the full tension of the novel as the timelines of Before Mars and its predecessor coincide and key outcomes have already been revealed. Bourke added that despite its "compelling prose" and interesting puzzles, Before Mars "didn’t really speak to me". She said she found herself "lacking in a real sense of emotional investment, either in Anna as a character or in the novel's outcome".

In a review of the book in the Los Angeles Times, Swapna Krishna described the ending as "stunning", although "a bit abrupt". But she added that the novel "is [more] about the journey rather than the destination", and it is "an excellent ... page-turn[er]". Krishna called Anna "a well-rounded character" who is open about her fears and failures. A reviewer in the Financial Times called Before Mars "a slow-burn psychological thriller" that has a "dark twist" at the end reminiscent of Paula Hawkins' 2015 novel, The Girl on the Train. Jeremy Brett wrote in Foundation: The International Review of Science Fiction that Anna's "self-doubt and increasing paranoia" adds "a layer of emotional complexity" to Before Mars that lifts it above many other similar science fiction stories. He praised the "flair and accuracy" with which Newman describes human behavior, and said her Planetfall series shows how "the most treacherous place in the known universe is the human heart and its capacity for doing wrong."

In a review for Publishers Weekly Jennifer Udden from Barry Goldblatt Literary praised the author by saying "Newman has constructed a captivating puzzle of a tale that, while harrowing, concludes on a poignantly hopeful note, leaving the door open for further adventures in an all-too-believable future."

== Works cited ==
- Newman, Emma (2018). Before Mars. New York City: Ace Books. ISBN 978-0-399-58732-0.
