= Passing Strange (novella) =

2017 novella by Ellen Klages

- First edition cover
- Author: Ellen Klages
- Language: English
- Genre: Fantasy
- Set in: 1940s San Francisco
- Publisher: Tor.com
- Publication date: January 24, 2017 (US)
- Publication place: United States
- Media type: Print, ebook
- Pages: 224 pp (First edition US paperback)
- Awards: BFA—Novella (2018); Gaylactic Spect—Novel (2018); WFA—Novella (2018)
- ISBN: 9780765389527 (First edition US paperback)
- OCLC: 968712123
- Dewey Decimal: 813/.6
- LC Class: PS3611.L34 P37 2017
- Website: http://ellenklages.com/writing/passing-strange/

Passing Strange is a 2017 LGBT fantasy novella by American writer Ellen Klages, published by Tor.com. It tells the story of several women's intersecting lives in 1940s San Francisco.

== Plot summary ==
In the present, lawyer Helen Young receives a terminal diagnosis. She retrieves a painting by a famous pulp magazine artist named Haskel and sells it to an unsavory collector named Marty. She leaves most of the money to charity, returns home, and commits suicide.

In 1940s San Francisco, a group of queer women try to avoid America's anti-LGBT laws while living Bohemian lives. These women include Loretta Haskel, the aforementioned artist; Emily Netterfield, a cross-dressing singer; Franny Travers, a witch with the power of teleportation, and Helen Young. Haskel and Emily meet at Mona's 440 Club and establish a relationship. Haskel's estranged husband Len returns to the city, seeking money; Haskel spurns him and asks Helen to initiate divorce proceedings. One night, Emily and Haskel decide to go dancing. Emily dresses as a man so the couple can avoid suspicion. As they leave a performance hall, Len attacks them. Emily pushes Len into the street, where he is killed by a car. The police arrive, but Emily escapes using Franny's powers.

Haskel uses a family heirloom to create a magical painting of the night in which she and Emily went dancing. They escape into the world of the painting, allowing them to avoid persecution and live happily as long as the painting exists. Helen, Franny, and their other friends agree that the last living member of the group will destroy the painting; Franny places it inside a booby-trapped box.

In the present, Marty opens the sealed box, triggering the trap and destroying the fragile painting.

== Reception ==
The novella received positive reviews. The Chicago Tribune called the novella "Klage's best work to date" and praised its depiction of gay life in the 1940s. The novella also received praise for its depiction of same-sex romance and its detailed portrayal of historical San Francisco.

Year	Award	Category	Result	Ref.
2017	Nebula Award	Novella	Nominated	
2018	British Fantasy Award	Novella	Won	
2018	Gaylactic Spectrum Award	Novel	Won	
2018	Locus Award	Novella	Finalist	
2018	World Fantasy Award	Novella	Won	
