= Proud Helios =

1995 novel by Melissa Scott

- Author: Melissa Scott
- Cover artist: Keith Birdsong
- Language: English
- Series: Star Trek: Deep Space Nine
- Genre: Science fiction novel
- Publisher: Pocket Books
- Publication date: February 1995
- Publication place: United States
- Media type: Print (paperback)
- Pages: 277 pp
- ISBN: 0-671-88390-9 (first edition, paperback)
- OCLC: 31863302
- Preceded by: Antimatter
- Followed by: Valhalla

Proud Helios is a Star Trek: Deep Space Nine novel written by Melissa Scott.

== Plot ==
Free trade through the Bajoran wormhole is vital for the Bajoran economy. Unfortunately, a cloaked ship is attacking other ships, killing the crew and taking all the cargo. The attacking is going after Cardassian ships as well, causing the powerful Gul Dukat to show up. The two sides reach a cautious agreement to hunt down the ship. Unfortunately two Deep Space Nine crew-people are captured by the cloaked enemy. Dukat doesn't care that these people are in harm's way and now the rest of Deep Space Nine's forces must rescue their trapped comrades, neutralize the ship and keep war at bay.

== Behind the scenes ==
When asked why she wanted to write a Star Trek novel, Scott commented, "Partly, I think, it's the simple fact that when you encounter a world and characters that you enjoy, you want to be a part of it, too. In a TV series, that temptation is particularly strong, because, after all, it is a series. There are people out there who contribute the stories, create the world, and there's always the possibility that you can become one of them. In my case, because I came to Trek from the Blish novelizations, and was acutely conscious of how the written versions compared to the actual episodes, the idea of writing not screenplays but novels was very appealing. Plus, of course, I'm a better novelist than I am a screenwriter!"

Scott remembers how she got the assignment to write Proud Helios. "John Ordover approached me, knowing I was a Trek fan as well as an established SF writer in my own right, and asked if I'd be interested in doing a book in the DS9 universe. I really liked the series, particularly the constraints of keeping the show to the single station (this was early in the show's evolution), so I jumped at the chance. I asked if he had any guidelines, any stories he particularly wanted to see, or any he didn't, and he said, no, not really, he'd leave that up to me. So I went home, mulled it over and came up with the proposal that became Proud Helios. I sent it to John, who called me back almost at once, laughing. He'd promised himself that he wouldn't do any stories with space pirates--- and here I'd sent him one he wanted to use"
