= The Ruby Tear =

1997 novel by Suzy McKee Charnas

- First edition (publ. Forge Books)
- Author: Suzy McKee Charnas
- Language: English
- Publication date: 1997

The Ruby Tear is a 1997 novel by American author Suzy McKee Charnas writing as Rebecca Brand.
