= Dorothea Dreams =

1986 novel by Suzy McKee Charnas

- First edition
- Author: Suzy McKee Charnas
- Cover artist: Ron Walotsky
- Language: English
- Genre: Novel
- Publisher: Arbor House Pub Co
- Publication date: April 1986
- Publication place: United States
- Media type: Print (hardcover)
- ISBN: 0-87795-777-0
- OCLC: 12550197
- Dewey Decimal: 813/.54 19
- LC Class: PS3553.H325 D6 1986

Dorothea Dreams is a 1986 novel by American author Suzy McKee Charnas.
