= Anne Harris (author) =

American novelist (1964–2022)

- Born: 1964
- Died: November 17, 2022 (aged 57–58)
- Education: Oakland University (BS)
- Writing career
- Pen name: Pearl North; Jessica Freely
- Genre: science fiction
- Notable awards: Gaylactic Spectrum Award

Anne Harris (pen names, Pearl North and Jessica Freely; 1964 – November 17, 2022) was an American science fiction author from Michigan.

== Life and work ==
Harris published under three different names: her legal name, "Pearl North", and "Jessica Freely".

Harris was a graduate of Ferndale High School and Oakland University, the latter with a Bachelor of Science in computer and information science. According to her blog, she worked as a cook in a vegetarian restaurant, a freelance journalist, a public relations writer, an operations research analyst for the United States Department of Defense, and "a doggy daycare worker". Harris lived in the Detroit, Michigan area all her life; as of 2016, she was living in Royal Oak with her husband Steve.

Harris also taught in Seton Hill University's Writing Popular Fiction MFA program. Harris's literary works have been recognized and highlighted at Michigan State University in their Michigan Writers Series. She wrote under two pseudonyms. As Pearl North she published Libyrinth in 2009. It is the first volume in a young adult science fiction trilogy. The second in the series, The Boy From Ilysies, came out in November 2010, and the third, The Book of the Night, was released in 2012. Under the pen name Jessica Freely, Harris has written numerous male/male erotic romance ebooks since 2008.

Harris's second novel, Accidental Creatures (1998), won the first Gaylactic Spectrum Award for Best Novel dealing with LGBT characters, themes, and issues.

Her short story, "Still Life with Boobs", was a 2005 Nebula Award finalist for Best Short Story. Her other novels include The Nature of Smoke (her first, published in 1996, shortlisted in translation for the 2007 Japanese Sense of Gender Award) and Inventing Memory, published in 2004.

Harris was "a long-term advocate of women's rights, reproductive freedom, and LGBT rights."
