= Still Life With Boobs =

Short story by Anne Harris

"Still Life With Boobs" is a magic realism/fantasy short story by Anne Harris. It was first published in Talebones.

== Synopsis ==
In the aftermath of her relationship ending, Gwen Bramble's breasts spontaneously detach from her body and take on a life of their own — one which appears to be more enjoyable than Gwen's.

== Reception ==
"Still Life with Boobs" was a finalist for the Nebula Award for Best Short Story of 2005.

Strange Horizons found it "very funny", and noted that "there is no need for the reader to know" how or why Gwen's breasts are able to do this, as "[t]he result, not the mechanics, is the point." At Tangent Online, Lois Tilton praised the story as "too much fun to be much marred by the occasional slips into pathos" and felt that readers should be able to "pretend suspension of disbelief". Mike Resnick praised it as "delightful", while Tor.com called it "oddly kinky".

== Origin ==
Harris stated that she was inspired to write the story when a friend declined to wear a particular low-cut blouse in public, saying that it would make her feel like her breasts were having conversations with other people without her knowledge.
