= The Vampire Tapestry =

1980 novel by Suzy McKee Charnas

- First edition
- Author: Suzy McKee Charnas
- Language: English
- Genre: Horror
- Publisher: Simon & Schuster
- Publication date: August 1980
- Publication place: U.S.
- Media type: Print
- Pages: 285
- ISBN: 0-671-25415-4

The Vampire Tapestry is a 1980 horror novel by American author Suzy McKee Charnas. The story follows a vampire by the name of Dr. Edward Lewis Weyland as he preys upon humanity while simultaneously trying to uncover who and what he truly is. Weyland is unlike many traditional vampires, such as Bram Stoker's Dracula, in that his condition stems from biologic rather than supernatural causes. This fact, coupled with Weyland's social behaviors, has led some critics to consider The Vampire Tapestry as a work of feminist science fiction.

Initially, Suzy McKee Charnas did not intend to publish The Vampire Tapestry as a full-length novel. Instead, Charnas claims that the first chapter, "The Ancient Mind at Work", spun another story out of itself, and eventually a book with five stories all connected through Dr. Weyland. The third of these stories, "Unicorn Tapestry", was adapted into a play called Vampire Dreams after being published as a separate novella which won the 1981 Nebula Award for Best Novella.

== Plot summary ==
The Vampire Tapestry is composed of five free-standing novella-length chapters which are stitched together to form one episodic plot, or hence the name, tapestry. In the first half of the novel, the narrative is presented from the point of view of different characters as their paths cross Weyland's. In the final chapters, the focus centers on Weyland himself.

=== The ancient mind at work ===
In the opening chapter of the novel, the narrative follows a woman by the name of Katje de Groot who happens to work at the same college, the Cayslin Center for the Study of Man, where Dr. Weyland is a professor. One late night, Katje observes what she fantasizes to be a vampire fleeing from the scene of a feeding session. Although she comes to the conclusion that what really happened was nothing more than an anthropologist, Dr. Weyland, leaving the lab with one of his sleep subjects, her imagination begins to run wild.

When Dr. Weyland gives a public lecture on "The Demonology of Dreams," Katje naturally decides to attend. During the lecture, the subject of vampirism gets brought up by the audience. From the back of the lecture hall, Katje watches in astonishment as Dr. Weyland provides uncanny insight into how vampires might actually look and behave. For example, they might utilize a needle in their tongue to extract blood rather than having the more conspicuous canine fangs.

The next day, Katje compliments Weyland on his lecture. He returns the compliment by inviting her to participate in his sleep study. Initially, she refuses the offer but eventually reconsiders. When she reaches the lab, however, Weyland forces Katje back to his car. While trying to escape from Weyland, Katje manages to shoot him twice. The chapter ends with Weyland driving off into the distance.

=== The land of lost content ===
The second chapter begins with a pair of bystanders finding Weyland collapsed at the wheel of his Mercedes-Benz. When Weyland refuses the men's offer to alert the authorities, they plot to capitalize on the suspicious nature of his situation. After pawning the car, a friend of the bystanders proceeds to tend to Weyland's injuries. Weyland's state of medical emergency leads him to rip out an IV and begin drinking the blood coming from the other end. This queer activity subsequently leads the men to sell Weyland to a man named Roger.

Roger holds Weyland captive in the spare room of his Manhattan apartment where he plans to display the vampire as a museum exhibit. The situation gets complicated when Roger's nephew Mark, the protagonist of the chapter, empathically befriends Weyland. Before long, Roger employs the aid of a satanist by the name of Alan Reese to market Weyland's captivity. When Alan's feeding schedule forces Weyland into starvation, Mark intervenes. In doing so, Weyland is able to escape the confines of Roger's apartment, which brings the chapter to a close.

=== Unicorn tapestry ===
Just as the first two chapters are told from the point of view of Katje and Mark respectively, "Unicorn Tapestry" offers a new perspective on Weyland from yet another source, Dr. Floria Landauer. Floria is a psychotherapist who has been asked to counsel Dr. Weyland by Doug Sharpe, the dean of Cayslin College. Initially Weyland is resistant to Floria's sessions, claiming for example that he is being made ridiculous by her techniques. Eventually he warms up to her therapy and even begins to embrace it. He begins by coyly admitting his "delusions" of being a vampire, but this flowers into explications of his hunting habits, sexuality, take on humanity, and much more. Ultimately, Weyland sees the therapy sessions as a method of self-discovery for he has no knowledge of his origin and no other members of his species to interact with.

One day when Floria arrives at her office, her secretary Hilda exclaims that someone has been through their records. Floria immediately realizes that the perpetrator was Weyland and that he had confiscated all incriminating evidence of his condition. That evening when Floria returns home, Weyland is waiting for her. After acquiring a written testament to his mental well-being, Weyland threatens to kill Floria. Floria is able to convince him otherwise however by offering to fulfill his sexual curiosities. In the end, Weyland accepts her offer and leaves her be as he flees to New Mexico.

=== A musical interlude ===
Shortly after arriving in Albuquerque, New Mexico, Weyland's colleagues invite him to attend an opera in Santa Fe. During the drive over, Weyland begins to feel sick; he fed before leaving and never had the chance to rest (which upsets his system). Halfway through the performance, Weyland's upset stomach gets the best of him, and he is forced to leave the show. While wandering around the perimeter of theatre, Weyland comes across a man whom he attacks and kills. The kill was unprovoked, utilized a technique which Weyland had not used in years, and was not done out of hunger. Although confused by his own actions, Weyland is forced to focus on disposing the body. After doing so, Weyland re-enters the opera and reflects upon his actions.

=== The last of Dr. Weyland ===
In the final chapter, Weyland remains in New Mexico as he continues his professorship at the University of New Mexico. As a hunter, Albuquerque provides Weyland with a new set of challenges which he had not faced while in New York at Cayslin. In particular, the size of the city hinders Weyland's anonymity. Consequently, Weyland must establish a reliable social network from which to prey upon. One such member of this network is Alison Beader, a teaching assistant whom Weyland also engages with sexually. When Weyland is forced to sever his connection with Alison for fear that she is becoming too close to him, he finds himself between reliable food sources. One night he chooses to drive to a nearby campground to satisfy his hunger.

In parallel with Weyland's relationship to Alison, Weyland also begins to forge a relationship with a fellow anthropologist named Irv. One day Weyland is approached by a woman named Dorothea Winslow, a friend of Irv, and is asked if Irv has been acting himself lately. Weyland is indifferent to the question and answers that he is not sure. Soon after this encounter, Irv commits suicide and dedicates a large portion of his final letter to Weyland, drawing much unwanted attention to him. When Weyland returns home after the incident, Alan Reese is waiting for him. Alan claims that he knows about Floria and saw Weyland feeding at the campground. Alan holds Weyland at gunpoint, but Weyland is eventually able to reverse the situation by tricking Alan into thinking that he can turn him into a vampire. Rather than doing so, Weyland kills him. With growing fear of becoming discovered, Weyland is forced to enter a state of hibernation and the novel is brought to a close.

== Primary characters ==
- Dr. Edward Lewis Weyland: The novel's protagonist. Weyland is infinitely old and lives his life between states of extended hibernation. Upon awakening from said states, he has no recollection of the people, places, or events from his past "life," but retains basic hunting and communication skills. He is unlike other vampires in that he does not fear garlic, take the form of a bat, sleep in a coffin, convert victims into vampires through feeding practices, or possess long canine teeth fangs. He uses a needle-like projection under his tongue to acquire blood from human victims. Weyland works as a professor of anthropology at various institutions throughout the novel.
- Katje de Groot: Featured in "The Ancient Mind Work." Katje is an older white female who was raised in colonial Africa. She is employed as a housekeeper at the Cayslin Club—the faculty club of Cayslin College. Katje manages to shoot Weyland twice in the torso.
- Mark: Featured in "The Land of Lost Content." A fourteen-year-old boy who has been cast in the middle of his neglectful parents's divorce. Troubles in his home life have led Mark to live with his sleazy uncle Roger. Mark is responsible for releasing Weyland from Roger's apartment.
- Alan Reese: Featured in "The Land of Lost Content" and "The Last of Dr. Weyland." A satanic friend of Roger. Reese charges admission to Weyland's feeding sessions while he is trapped in Roger's apartment. Ultimately, Reese's desire to acquire Weyland's powers leads to his demise.
- Dr. Floria Landauer: Featured in "Unicorn Tapestry." A burnout psychotherapist who needs psychological help herself (156). Her therapy eventually crosses professional bounds when she sleeps with Weyland.
- Irv: Featured in "Unicorn Tapestry." A professor of anthropology at the University of New Mexico. The complete antithesis of Weyland, a social butterfly (263).

== Awards and recognition ==
=== The Vampire Tapestry ===
- Finalist for the 1982 Nebula Award which recognizes the best works of science fiction or fantasy published in the U.S. during the previous year.
- Finalist for the 1981 Balrog Award, a fan-voted award for works of fantasy.
- Finalist for the 1981 Locus Award, awarded by Locus Magazine's annual readers' poll.

=== Unicorn Tapestry ===
- Winner of the 1981 Nebula Award for Best Novella, awarded to the best science fiction or fantasy fiction published in the United States during the previous year.
- Finalist for the 1981 World Fantasy Award, an international award given to authors and artists who have demonstrated outstanding achievement in the field of fantasy.
