= Ellen Klages =

American writer (born 1954)

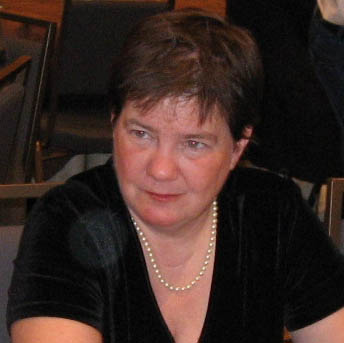
- Ellen Klages at the 2007 World Fantasy Convention
- Born: 1954 (age 71–72); Columbus, Ohio, U.S.
- Education: University of Michigan
- Writing career
- Language: English
- Website: ellenklages.com

Ellen Klages (IPA: /ˈkleɪ.dʒɪs/, KLAY-jiss; born 1954) is an American science, science fiction, fantasy and historical fiction writer who lives in San Francisco. Her novelette "Basement Magic" won the 2005 Nebula Award for Best Novelette. She had previously been nominated for Hugo, Nebula, and Campbell awards. Her first (non-genre) novel, The Green Glass Sea, was published by Viking Children's Books in 2006. It won the 2007 Scott O'Dell Award for Historical Fiction, the New Mexico Book Award, and the Judy Looez Memorial Award. Portable Childhoods, a collection of her short fiction published by Tachyon Publications, was named a 2008 World Fantasy Award finalist. White Sands, Red Menace, the sequel to The Green Glass Sea, was published in Fall 2008 and won the New Mexico and California Book Awards. In 2010, her short story "Singing on a Star" was nominated for a World Fantasy Award. In 2018 her novella Passing Strange won the World Fantasy and British Fantasy Awards and was nominated for the Mythopoeic Fantasy Award for Adult Literature. In 2019, her novel Out of Left Field won the Children’s History Book Prize and the Ohioana Book Award.

== Biography ==
Ellen Janeway Klages was born in Columbus, Ohio, on July 9, 1954, and now lives in San Francisco. She holds a degree in philosophy from the University of Michigan. In 1992, she began working at the San Francisco Exploratorium, where she was selected to co-author a children's science activity book with science fiction author Pat Murphy. Murphy encouraged Klages to write her own stories as well. Her first novelette, "Time Gypsy", was published in 1999 and was a finalist for the Nebula Award and Hugo Award. She was also nominated for the John W. Campbell Award for Best New Writer in 2000. Besides her writing, she also graduated from the Second City Conservatory, the Clarion South Workshop, and has served on the Motherboard of the James Tiptree Jr. Award for twenty years.

Klages is also known for doing stand-up comedy and other performances as an auctioneer annually at Wiscon. The Wiscon Tiptree Auction is a fundraiser for the James Tiptree, Jr. Award; Klages also serves on the Board for the award. "At past Tiptree auctions, auctioneer/comedian Ellen Klages has auctioned off her own hair, Mary Doria Russell's brassiere, a hand-knitted uterus, a kangaroo-scrotum purse, a cherry pie, and a Xena lawn butt". Klages was a Guest of Honor at Wiscon 33.

== Awards ==
Year	Work	Award	Category	Result	Ref
1999	"Time Gypsy"	Hugo Award	Novelette	Shortlisted	
1999	"Time Gypsy"	Locus Award	Novelette	29th	
1999	"Time Gypsy"	Nebula Award	Novelette	Shortlisted	
1999	"Time Gypsy"	Tiptree Award	—	Longlist	
2000	—	Astounding Award	—	Finalist	
2001	"Flying Over Water"	Nebula Award	Short Story	Shortlisted	
2005	"Basement Magic"	Nebula Award	Novelette	Won	
2005	"The Green Glass Sea"	Locus Award	Short Story	25th	
2007	The Green Glass Sea	Locus Award	First Novel	4th	
2007	The Green Glass Sea	Scott O'Dell Award for Historical Fiction	—	Won	
2007	"In the House of the Seven Librarians"	Locus Award	Novelette	7th	
2008	"Mrs. Zeno's Paradox"	Locus Award	Short Story	19th	
2008	Portable Childhoods	Crawford Award	—	Finalist	
2008	Portable Childhoods	Locus Award	Collection	15th	
2008	Portable Childhoods	World Fantasy Award	Collection	Shortlisted	
2010	"Singing on a Star"	Locus Award	Short Story	27th	
2010	"Singing on a Star"	World Fantasy Award	Short Fiction	Shortlisted	
2012	"Goodnight Moons"	Locus Award	Short Story	15th	
2013	"The Education of a Witch"	Locus Award	Short Story	23rd	
2014	"Wakulla Springs"	Hugo Award	Novella	Shortlisted	
2014	"Wakulla Springs"	Locus Award	Novella	2nd	
2014	"Wakulla Springs"	Nebula Award	Novella	Shortlisted	
2014	"Wakulla Springs"	World Fantasy Award	Novella	Won	
2015	"Amicae Aeternum"	Locus Award	Short Story	21st	
2018	Wicked Wonders	Alex Award	—	Nominated	
2018	Wicked Wonders	Locus Award	Collection	10th	
2018	Wicked Wonders	World Fantasy Award	Collection	Shortlisted	
2018	Passing Strange	British Fantasy Award	Novella	Won	
2018	Passing Strange	Gaylactic Spectrum Award	Novel	Won	
2018	Passing Strange	Locus Award	Novella	4th	
2018	Passing Strange	Mythopoeic Award	Adult	Shortlisted	
2018	Passing Strange	Nebula Award	Novella	Shortlisted	
2018	Passing Strange	World Fantasy Award	Novella	Won	

== Bibliography ==
=== Science fiction and fantasy ===
==== Collections ====
- Portable Childhoods, short fiction collection (Tachyon Publications, 2007)
  - "Basement Magic" (2003 novelette)
  - "Intelligent Design" (2005 short story)
  - "The Green Glass Sea" (2004 short story)
  - "Clip Art" (2007 short story)
  - "Triangle" (2001 short story)
  - "The Feed Bag" (2003 poem)
  - "Flying Over Water" (2000 short story)
  - "Möbius, Stripped of a Muse" (2007 short story)
  - "Time Gypsy" (1998 novelette)
  - "Be Prepared" (2002 short fiction)
  - "Travel Agency" (2002 short story)
  - "A Taste of Summer" (2002 short story)
  - "Ringing Up Baby" (2006 short story)
  - "Guys Day Out" (2005 short story)
  - "Portable Childhoods" (2007 novelette)
  - "In the House of the Seven Librarians" (2006 novelette)
- Wicked Wonders, short fiction collection (Tachyon Publications, 2017)
  - Introduction by Karen Joy Fowler
  - The Education of a Witch
  - Amicae Aeternum
  - Mrs. Zeno's Paradox
  - Singing on a Star
  - Hey, Presto
  - Echoes of Aurora
  - Friday Night at St. Cecilia's
  - Caligo Lane
  - Goodnight Moons
  - Gone to the Library
  - Household Management
  - Sponda the Suet Girl and the Secret of the French Pearl
  - Woodsmoke
  - The Scary Ham
  - Afterword: Why I Write Short Fiction

==== Novellas ====
- Passing Strange (Tor.com, 2017)

==== Novelettes ====
- "Time Gypsy", Bending the Landscape: Science Fiction, edited by Nicola Griffith and Stephen Pagel (Overlook Press, 1999)
- "Basement Magic", The Magazine of Fantasy & Science Fiction, May 2003
- "In the House of the Seven Librarians", Firebirds Rising, edited by Sharyn November (Viking, April, 2006)

==== Short stories ====
- "Flying Over Water", Lady Churchill's Rosebud Wristlet #7 (October, 2000) (Nebula Award Finalist)
- "Triangle", Bending the Landscape: Horror, edited by Nicola Griffith and Stephen Pagel (Overlook Press, 2001) (Spectrum Award Finalist)
- "Travel Agency", Strange Horizons (February 2002)
- "A Taste of Summer", Black Gate #3 (Winter, 2002)
- "Be Prepared", The Infinite Matrix (Sept, 2002)
- "Green Glass Sea", Strange Horizons (September, 2004)
- "Intelligent Design", Strange Horizons (December 2005)
- "Guys Day Out", Sci Fiction (April 2005)
- "Ringing Up Baby", Nature (April, 2006)
- "Friday Night at St. Cecilia's", The Coyote Road, edited by Ellen Datlow and Terri Windling (Viking Juvenile, 2007)
- "Mrs. Zeno's Paradox", Eclipse One, edited by Jonathan Strahan (Night Shade Books, Oct 2007)
- "Echoes of Aurora", What Remains, with Geoff Ryman (Aqueduct Press, 2009), The Best Science Fiction and Fantasy of the Year Volume Four, edited by Jonathan Strahan (Night Shade Books, Mar 2010)
- "Singing on a Star", Firebirds Soaring, edited by Sharyn November (Viking, 2009). (World Fantasy Award Nominee for Best Short Story 2010)
- "A Practical Girl", Eclipse Three: New Science Fiction and Fantasy, edited by Jonathan Strahan (Night Shade Books, Oct 2009)
- "Goodnight Moons", Life on Mars: Tales from the New Frontier, ed. Jonathan Strahan (Viking, April 2011); The Best Science Fiction and Fantasy of the Year Volume Six, ed. Jonathan Strahan (Night Shade Books, Mar 2012)
- "The Education of a Witch", Under My Hat: Tales from the Cauldron, ed. Jonathan Strahan (Random House, Aug 2012)
- "Amicae Aeternum", Reach for Infinity, ed. Jonathan Strahan (2014)

=== Historical fiction ===
- The Green Glass Sea (Viking Children's Books, 2006)
- White Sands, Red Menace (Viking Children's Books, 2008)
- Out of Left Field (Viking Children's Books, 2018)

=== Non-fiction ===
- Harbin Hot Springs: Healing Waters, Sacred Land (HS Publishing, Inc., 1991)
- The Science Explorer: The Best Family Activities and Experiments from the World's Favorite Hands-On Science Museum, with Pat Murphy, Linda Shore (Henry Holt & Co., 1996)
- The Science Explorer Out and About: Fantastic Science Experiments Your Family Can Do Anywhere, with Pat Murphy, Linda Shore (Henry Holt & Co., 1997)
- Exploratorium: A Year of Discoveries (Chronicle Books, 1997)
- The Brain Explorer: Puzzles, Riddles, Illusions, and other Mental Adventures, with Pat Murphy, Linda Shore and Pearl Tesler (Henry Holt & Co., 1999)
