= Atlas Alone =

2019 novel by Emma Newman

- Author: Emma Newman
- Language: English
- Series: Planetfall #4
- Genre: Science fiction
- Publisher: Ace Books
- Publication date: 16 April 2019
- Publication place: United States
- ISBN: 978-0-399-58734-4
- Preceded by: Before Mars

Atlas Alone is a 2019 science fiction novel by British writer Emma Newman. It was first published in the United States as a paperback original in April 2019 by Ace Books, and in the United Kingdom by Gollancz. An audio edition of the book was published in April 2019 in the United States by Tantor Audio, and in the United Kingdom by Orion Publishing.

Atlas Alone is the fourth book in Newman's four-book Planetfall series, and takes place on the spaceship Atlas 2, six months after the events on Earth in the previous book, Before Mars. After Atlas follows Dee, who finds herself immersed in an investigation to discover who ordered the nuclear genocide that destroyed Earth. The novel was a finalist for the 2019 BSFA Award for Best Novel.

== Plot synopsis ==
Six months after leaving Earth, Dee is seething with rage towards the people who ordered the nuclear strike that destroyed Earth. She knows they are aboard-ship, but the way that Atlas 2 is set up, there is no way to contact anyone outside of one's immediate surroundings, nor even know who they are. Other than Dee, the only people who saw the detonation are her best friend, Carl; and Carl’s “sort-of lover,” Travis.

Dee tries to escape her trauma through an immersive game. An unexpected job offer by a designer who asks her help test his new game gives her access to the ship's computer, leading to her also being invited to play elite games. In the game world, she encounters a mysterious guide, who hints that they are there to help her. The game she finds herself in is different than any "mersive" she's played before, and she is shocked to learn that a man she killed inside the game has also died in the real world. When she discovered that the man is a member of an elite society also responsible for the destruction of earth, she realizes that she is on the path to discover the truth.

While Carl helps her investigate, her cagey guide performs seemingly impossible hacking feats to block him, while protecting Dee, and also inviting her to take her revenge on the destroyers of Earth.

As Atlas 2 continues its 20-year journey towards the colony established by the first Atlas ship, she finds out what the plans are for the colony upon arrival, and realizes that to save what is left of humanity, she might have to do something that risks what remains of her own.

== Reception ==
According to Publishers Weekly, "Newman builds on the best elements of her interconnected Planetfall series for this superb fourth volume". The review lauds her build-up of tense moments, "leading to a chilling, ethically complex ending. This winning combination of intriguing mystery and inventive SF richly rewards Newman’s longtime readers and will lure others to the series." The Fantasy Literature review positively notes the book's "overwhelming claustrophobia, tension, and sense of impending doom," calling the novel a study in both internal and external psychological pressures. Reviewer Jana Nyman particularly praised Newman's development of the character Dee, whose realness occasionally made her travails difficult for Nyman to bear as a reader. Her overall verdict: "Atlas Alone is an unflinching dive into childhood trauma, social alienation, and the potential cost of survival instincts. Highly recommended."

In Kirkus Reviews, reviewer Ana Grilo calls Atlas Alone a "deeply, deeply unsettling horror novel, one that juxtaposes the personal trauma of one woman and a world-wide catastrophe and what happens when the two combine to tell a story of post-traumatic stress disorder and vengeance." Calling the book a "great read", this review, as do the others, explores the moral issues raised by Dee's journey and decisions: "Atlas Alone ends on a chilling note that questions the morality of decision-making and who gets to decide. The most unsettling aspect of it—without spoiling—is how as a reader, I was onboard with Dee’s decisions until I too, was confronted with the book’s examination of it."

== Works cited ==
- Newman, Emma (2019). Atlas Alone. New York City: Ace Books. ISBN 978-0-399-58734-4.
