= Gaylactic Spectrum Awards =

American LGBT artistic awards (founded 1999)

- Logo of the Gaylactic Spectrum Award Foundation
- Awarded for: Excellence in LGBT speculative fiction
- Country: United States
- Presented by: Gaylactic Network (1999–2001); Gaylactic Spectrum Awards Foundation (2002–present)
- First award: 1999
- Website: Spectrumawards.org/

The Gaylactic Spectrum Awards were given to works of science fiction, fantasy and horror that explore LGBTQ (lesbian, gay, bisexual, transgender) topics in a positive way. Established in 1998, the awards were initially presented by the Gaylactic Network, with awards first awarded in 1999. In 2002 the awards were given their own organization, the Gaylactic Spectrum Awards Foundation. No awards have been announced since 2019.

The major award categories were for best novel, short fiction, and other works. The winners and short list of recommended nominees were decided by a jury. One of the most recognized authors, Melissa Scott has received the most awards overall, with five wins. She also holds the record for most nominations. Works of any format produced before the awards were first given were eligible to be inducted into the "Hall of Fame", although no work has been inducted since 2003. The list of award winners and Hall of Fame inductees has been called a "who's who of science fiction" by the GLBTQ Encyclopedia Project. This article lists the winners in each of the categories, and the inductees to the Hall of Fame.

== Award process ==
Since their inception, the awards were given in categories for novels and best other work. Other categories were also added and removed in intervening years, including categories for short fiction (since the second year) and comic books for one year. A short lived "People's Choice" award voted by convention attendees was also awarded to one work from any of the category nominee short lists. The award for best novel was the only one to have been handed out every year since the awards began. In 2014, there were three regular categories: novels, short fiction and other works. The "other works" category included comic books, graphic novels, movies, television episodes, multimedia, anthologies, story collections, gaming products, artwork, and music.

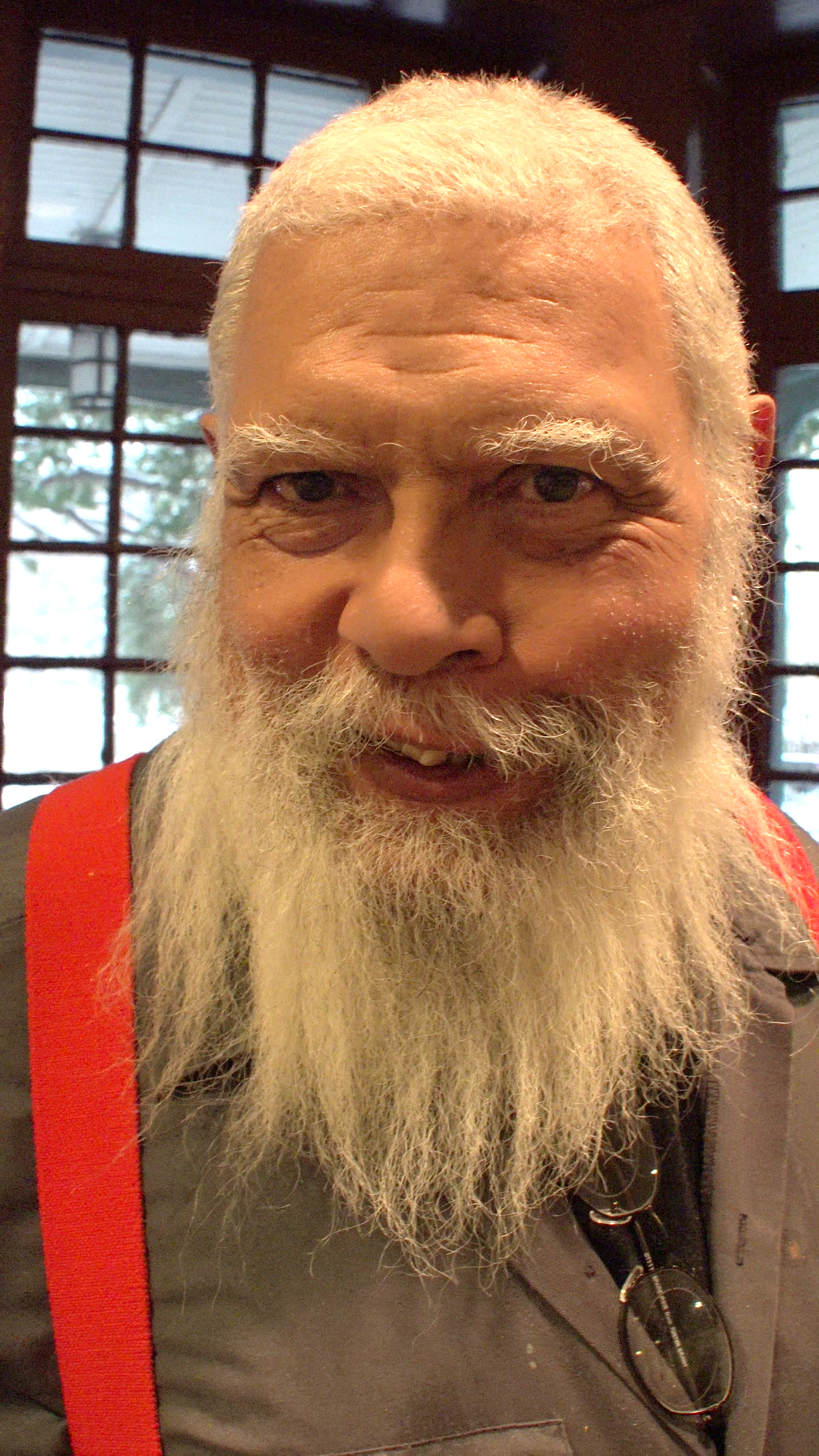
Samuel R. Delany won a special Lifetime Achievement award.

The categories are open to submission of English-language works released during the prior calendar year in North America that include "significant positive GLBT content." The time-frame of eligibility was based on copyright date for first printing for written works, cover date for magazines and comic books, release date for films, first air date for television. Works had to have been "professionally" published or distributed to be eligible for consideration and be wholly original and legal. The judges could choose to extend eligibility for a work due to oversight, confusion regarding release dates, or problems with availability. An open nomination/recommendation process was used to identify works to be considered by the judges. Works of any format produced before the inception of the awards were eligible to be inducted into the "Hall of Fame"; these inductees were selected solely by the judges.

The results were decided by a panel of judges from the list of submitted nominees; nominations could be made by anyone. The judges were volunteers from science fiction fandom and GLBT community, with one volunteer as the "Award Administrator". The judges review each recommended work and the longlist of nominees was reduced via review and discussion to a shortlist of finalists, and then one or more winners were chosen by consensus or vote. The results were generally announced and presented at Gaylaxicon, a convention dedicated to LGBT science fiction, although on occasion they were presented at Worldcon.

Each award consisted of an etched image on lucite on a stand, using a spiral galaxy in a triangle logo, based on the logo of the Gaylactic Network. The award winner's name, work title, award year and category were etched on a small plaque on the base or on the plexiglass itself. A small cash stipend was also awarded to winners in the Best Novel category. The cost of the awards was paid through individual donations and fundraising events.

== Winners ==
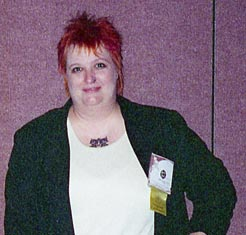
Melissa Scott has won the most awards.

Melissa Scott holds the record for the most award wins (five) and nominations (thirteen). Other authors and editors who have won the award multiple times are Nicola Griffith, David Gerrold, Keith Hartman, Laurie J. Marks, and Stephen Pagel. Samuel R. Delany is notable for winning a special "Lifetime Achievement" award. Steve Berman and Tanya Huff were finalists seven times without winning.

Per Locus's database, the most recent award was given in 2019 for novels, in 2010 for short fiction and in 2003 for the Hall of Fame.

=== List of winners ===
In the following table, the years correspond to the year of the award ceremony. The notes column details the type of media for entries in the other works category, or the name of the publication in which the entries were first published in the short fiction category. The years are linked to the appropriate year in literature, comics, television or film articles.

List of winners
Year	Author(s) / Editor(s) / Director(s)	Title	Publisher / Producer	Note	Category	Ref.
1999	Ann Harris	Accidental Creatures	Tor	Novel	Novel	
1999	Stephen Leigh	Dark Water's Embrace	Avon Eos	Novel	Novel	
1999	Nicola Griffith & Stephen Pagel	Bending the Landscape: Science Fiction	Overlook	Anthology	Other work	
2000	Keith Hartman	The Gumshoe, the Witch, and the Virtual Corpse	Meisha Merlin	Novel	Novel^{[A]}	
2000	Peg Kerr	The Wild Swans	Warner Aspect	Novel	Novel	
2000	Eleanor Arnason	"Dapple"	Bantam Dell	in Asimov's SF 09/99	Short fiction	
2000	Spike Jonze & Charlie Kaufman	Being John Malkovich	USA Films	Film	Other work	
2001	David Gerrold	Jumping Off the Planet	Tor	Novel	Novel	
2001	Joss Whedon et al.	Buffy the Vampire Slayer	Fox/Mutant Enemy Prod.	Television series	Other work^{[A]}	
2002	Hugh Nissenson	The Song of the Earth	Algonquin	Novel	Novel	
2002	Alexis Glynn Latner	"Kindred"	Overlook	in Bending the Landscape: Horror	Short fiction	
2002	Nicola Griffith & Stephen Pagel	Bending the Landscape: Horror	Overlook	Anthology	Other work	
2003	Laurie J. Marks	Fire Logic	Tor	Novel	Novel	
2003	Sarah Monette	"Three Letters from the Queen of Elfland"	Small Beer Press	Lady Churchill's Rosebud Wristlet #11	Short fiction	
2003	Mark Millar et al.	The Authority issues #28-29	DC Comics	Comic book issues	Comic/graphic novel	
2003	Judd Winick et al.	Green Lantern issues #153-155, "Hate Crime"	DC Comics	Comic book issues	Comic/graphic novel	
2003	Michael Rowe (ed.)	Queer Fear II	Arsenal Pulp Press	Anthology	Other work	
2004	Nalo Hopkinson	The Salt Roads	Warner	Novel	Novel	
2004	Barth Anderson	"Lark Till Dawn, Princess"	Warner Aspect	in Mojo: Conjure Stories	Short fiction	
2004	Tony Kushner	Angels in America	HBO	Television series	Other work	
2004	Greg Rucka & Michael Lark	Gotham Central issues #6–10, "Half a Life"	DC Comics	Comic book issues	Other work	
2005	Laurie J. Marks	Earth Logic	Tor	Novel	Novel	
2005	Richard Hall	"Country People"	Southern Tier	in Shadows of the Night	Short fiction	
2006	Karin Lowachee	Cagebird	Warner Aspect	Novel	Novel	
2007	Hal Duncan	Vellum	Del Rey	Novel	Novel	
2007	David Gerrold	"In the Quake Zone"	SFBC	in Down These Dark Spaceways	Short fiction	
2007	Joy Parks	"Instinct"	Arsenal Pulp Press	in The Future Is Queer	Short fiction	
2007	Christopher Barzak	"The Language of Moths"	Sovereign Media	in Realms of Fantasy	Short fiction	
2007	Richard Labonté & Lawrence Schimel (eds.)	The Future Is Queer	Arsenal Pulp Press	Anthology	Other work	
2007	Russell T Davies et al.	Torchwood Season 1	BBC	Television series	Other work	
2007	James McTeigue James McTeigue et al.	V for Vendetta	Warner Bros.	Film	Other work	
2008	Ginn Hale	Wicked Gentlemen	Blind Eye Books	Novel	Novel	
2008	Joshua Lewis	Ever So Much More Than Twenty	Lethe Press	in So Fey	Short fiction	
2009	Elizabeth Bear	The Stratford Man (Hell and Earth/Ink and Steel)	Roc	Duology	Novel	
2010	Richard Morgan	The Steel Remains	Del Rey	Novel	Novel	
2010	Hal Duncan	The Behold of the Eye	Lethe Press	in Lone Star Stories/Wilde Stories 2009	Short fiction	
2010	Melissa Scott	The Rocky Side of the Sky	Lethe Press	in Periphery	Short fiction	
2011	Kathe Koja	Under the Poppy	Small Beer Press	Novel	Novel	
2012	J. A. Pitts	Honeyed Words	Tor	Novel	Novel	
2013	Madeline Miller	The Song of Achilles	Ecco Press	Novel	Novel	
2014	Melissa Scott & Amy Griswold	Death By Silver	Lethe Press	Novel	Novel	
2015	Melissa Scott	Fairs' Point	Lethe Press	Novel	Novel	
2016	Ian McDonald	Luna: New Moon	Tor	Novel	Novel	
2017	Heather Rose Jones	Mother of Souls	Bella Books	Novel	Novel	
2018	Ellen Klages	Passing Strange	Tor.com	Novel	Novel	
2019	Elizabeth Bear	Stone Mad	Tor.com	Novel	Novel	

^{A} People's Choice award winner.

=== Hall of Fame ===
Hall of Fame
Year	Author(s) / Editor(s)	Book Title	Publisher / Producer	Media	Ref.
1999	Maureen F. McHugh	China Mountain Zhang	Tor	Novel	
1999	Eric Garber & Lyn Paleo (eds.)	Uranian Worlds: A Guide to Alternative Sexuality in Science Fiction, Fantasy, and Horror	G. K. Hall	Non-fiction	
2000	Nicola Griffith	Slow River	Del Rey	Novel	
2000	Ellen Kushner	Swordspoint	Tor	Novel	
2000	Theodore Sturgeon	The World Well Lost	Universe (June 1953)	Short fiction	
2000	Donald P. Bellisario	Quantum Leap episode "Running for Honor"	Belisarius Prod.	Media (TV)	
2000	Richard O'Brien & Jim Sharman	The Rocky Horror Picture Show	20th Century Fox	Media (Film)	
2001	Arthur C. Clarke	Imperial Earth	Orion	Novel	
2001	Mary Doria Russell	The Sparrow & Children of God	Fawcett	Novels	
2001	Francesca Lia Block	Dangerous Angels aka The Weetzie Bat books	HarperCollins	Novel series	
2002	Samuel R. Delany	Dhalgren	Bantam	Novel	
2002	Joanna Russ	The Female Man	Bantam	Novel	
2002	Scott Lobdell et al.	Alpha Flight issue #106	Marvel Comics	Comic book	
2002	Geoff Ryman	Was	HarperCollins	Novel	
2003	Suzy McKee Charnas	The Holdfast Chronicles	Ballantine, Tor	Novel	
2003	Ursula K. Le Guin	The Left Hand of Darkness	Ace	Novel	
2003	Melissa Scott	Shadow Man	Tor	Novel^{[A]}	
2003	Diane Duane	Tale of the Five series (aka The Middle Kingdoms)	Tor	Novel	

^{A} People's Choice Award winner.

== See also ==
- LGBT themes in speculative fiction
- LGBTQ themes in horror fiction
- LGBT themes in comics
- Outline of science fiction
- Lambda Literary Award for Speculative Fiction
