= Trouble and Her Friends =

1994 novel by Melissa Scott

- Author: Melissa Scott
- Cover artist: Nicholas Jainschigg
- Genre: Science fiction, cyberpunk
- Publisher: Tor
- Publication date: 1994
- Pages: 379
- ISBN: 978-0812522136

Trouble and Her Friends is a science fiction novel by American writer Melissa Scott, first published in 1994. Set in the near future in the United States, the story follows India Carless, known as "Trouble" in her life as a criminal hacker, and her ex-lover Cerise. After leaving the underground scene three years earlier, they discover someone impersonating Trouble online, and decide to reunite to confront this impersonator, embarking on a cross-country journey. The novel features extensive use of virtual reality and neural implants, making it a solid example of cyberpunk; however, it is notable within the genre for its distinct feminist perspective and its focus on main characters who are gay or lesbian, reflecting themes common in much of Scott's work.

The novel won the 1995 Lambda Literary Award for Gay & Lesbian Science Fiction and Fantasy. Melissa Scott had previously been nominated in 1993 and 1994 for her novels Dreamships and Burning Bright, and would win again in 1996 for Shadow Man.
