= Dreaming Metal =

1997 novel by Melissa Scott

- First edition
- Author: Melissa Scott
- Cover artist: Nicholas Jainschigg
- Language: English
- Genre: Science fiction
- Publisher: Tom Dougherty Associates, Inc.
- Publication date: 1997
- Media type: Print
- ISBN: 0-312-86658-5
- OCLC: 40416529

Dreaming Metal is a 1997 science fiction novel by American writer Melissa Scott, which explores the question of at what point artificial intelligence becomes indistinguishable from human intelligence. Another theme of the book is the impact of terrorism on the lives of people and how artists react to this. The book is an example of the cyberpunk genre.

== Characters ==
- Celeste is an artificial intelligence. One component was originally owned by Reverdy Jian. A second component was added by Celinde Fortune, who needs a computer assistant to operate the karakuri (lifelike manikins) for her act.
- Celinde Fortune is an illusionist who uses lifelike manikins as part of her act to deliberately blur the line between "human" and "robot", "real" and "artificial".
- Reverdy Jian, a female spaceship pilot, is a main character from Dreamships, in which Scott establishes the political conflicts between those who advocate rights for artificial intelligences and those who view them as property. Her co-pilot, Imre Vaughn, is in a gay partnership with Red, who had a relationship with Fanning Jones in the past.
- Fanning Jones is a cousin of Celinde Fortune and member of a band that comes to perform at the same theatre as Fortune. The band is controversial because it includes members from two social classes. Fanning programs the visual effects for the band. He has the contacts that enable Fortune to purchase the components that become Celeste.

== Sources ==
- Hamburger, Susan, and Barbara Hoffert. "Dreaming Metal". Library Journal 122.9 (15 May 1997): 106-106.
- "In Prints: New In Paperback". Lambda Book Report 7.6 (Jan. 1999): 36.
- Steinberg, Sybil S., and Jeff Zaleski. "Forecasts: Fiction". Publishers Weekly 244.24 (16 June 1997): 50.
- Mort, John. "Adult books: Fiction". Booklist 93.19/20 (June 1997): 1669.
