= After Atlas =

2016 novel by Emma Newman

- First edition cover
- Author: Emma Newman
- Cover artist: Anxo Amarelle
- Language: English
- Series: Planetfall #2
- Genre: Science fiction
- Publisher: Roc Books
- Publication date: November 8, 2016
- Publication place: United States
- Media type: Paperback original
- Pages: 365
- ISBN: 978-0-425-28240-3
- Dewey Decimal: 823/.92—dc23
- LC Class: PR6114.E949A69 2016
- Preceded by: Planetfall
- Followed by: Before Mars

After Atlas is a 2016 science fiction novel by British writer Emma Newman. It was first published in the United States as a paperback original in November 2016 by Roc Books, and in the United Kingdom by Gollancz in paperback in February 2018. An audiobook, narrated by Andrew Kingston, was published in the United States by Blackstone Audio in November 2016, and in the United Kingdom by Orion Publishing in December 2017.

After Atlas is the second book in Newman's four-book Planetfall series, and takes place on Earth forty years after the spaceship Atlas departed to find God in the first book, Planetfall. The novel was generally well received by critics, and was a finalist for the 2017 Arthur C. Clarke Award, and placed eighth in the 2017 Locus Award for Best Science Fiction Novel. Publishers Weekly selected After Atlas as one of its best science fiction/fantasy/horror books of 2016.

== Plot summary ==
After Atlas takes place on Earth forty years after the departure of the spaceship Atlas to find God. No word of the fate of the mission has been received. Carlos Moreno works for the Ministry of Justice in northern Europe and is investigating the death in Dartmoor, England of Alejandro Casales, leader of the Circle, a religious cult in Texas. Carlos knew Alejandro as a child when he had been a member of the Circle. His mother had abandoned Carlos and his father when he was a baby to join the Pathfinder on Atlas, and Alejandro had taken them in. Carlos fled the cult as a teenager, and destitute, he became a corporate government indentured slave. He was trained as a murder investigator and contracted to the MoJ.

Carlos discovers that Alejandro was not murdered, but committed suicide. The Americans, who had been watching the investigation closely, hid the truth about the leader. Carlos is unhappy that the case is closed and is determined to find out why Alejandro killed himself. But Stefan Gabor, a wealthy businessman, buys Carlos's contract and instructs him to go to Texas, ostensibly to attend Alejandro's funeral, and locate and return Travis, Stefan's husband, to him. At the Circle, Carlos finds Travis and learns that he had left Stefan to join the cult where he would be out of reach. Stefan had coerced Travis into marrying him when he found out that Travis had hacked into Stefan's company's systems to expose corporate injustice. Stefan made him choose between being owned or killed. But Travis hacked his way to freedom and was allowed into the Circle when he agreed to share Stefan's secrets with them.

Carlos also learns that the Americans had approached Alejandro for help in building Atlas 2 to follow Atlas. They said the Circle's isolation would ensure the project's secrecy. Alejandro had been heavily involved in the planning and development of the original Atlas mission, but had been excluded from the final one thousand to travel with the ship. He was devastated and formed the Circle to take in all those working on the project who had been left behind. He agreed to help the Americans and modernised the cult. The Americans learnt from Travis that Stefan was also building a ship to follow the Pathfinder, and where his facilities are. Alejandro traveled to England to recruite disillusioned scientists, but discovered he was excluded from Atlas 2's ten thousand. Devastated for being left behind a second time, he hanged himself in Dartmoor.

Carlos threatens to expose Alejandro's suicide, the project's secrecy and its wasteful use of world resources, unless they give him a spot on the ship. That would be a way for him to escape his servitude. The Americans yield and allow Carlos and Travis aboard. As Atlas 2 leaves Earth orbit, Carlos and Travis observe a nuclear explosion in Spain where Stefan's facilities are and conclude that the Americans do not want him to follow the ship. Europe retaliates and a global nuclear war breaks out. They are shocked at what they see, and Carlos laments: "There is nothing to come from Earth after Atlas."

=== Technology ===
In After Atlas the world is run by corporate-owned governments (gov-corps). Citizens have neural implants and microchips embedded in their heads which connect them to the internet, enabling communication and access to information (depending on their security clearance). Their interface to the outside world is via an onboard APA (Artificial Personal Assistant) they can interact with mentally. Carlos also has an embedded virtual reality forensics system that allows him to revisit crime scenes in his head. The APA constantly monitors its host's health and online activity, enabling gov-corps to track its citizens.

Members of the Circle, an anti-technology cult, are not chipped. Visitors who are chipped have to wear a high-tensile alloy bracelet that shuts down the wearer's APA, blocking their access to the cloud. Any attempt to deactivate or remove the bracelet triggers a one hundred and twenty decibel alarm.

Due to world food shortages, food is manufactured with 3D printers using proteins and chemicals. Real food is scarce and generally only accessible by the wealthy.

== Reception ==
In a review in Booklist, Rachel Colias called After Atlas "both a murder mystery and a dystopian science-fiction novel set in an all-too-realistic future." She described Newman's world of corporate-owned governments as "frighteningly possible" and said the book's underlying malice "keeps the pages turning until the unexpected conclusion." Publishers Weekly described After Atlas as a "richly written companion novel to Planetfall". It said the "gumshoe adventure" explores the broken lives of the people Atlas left behind on its mission to find God, and is a "satisfying return to Newman’s future of greed and hope." Tom Shippey wrote in The Wall Street Journal that After Atlas is more of a "panel of a diptych" than a sequel to Newman's "much-praised Planetfall", and can be read quite comfortably as a stand-alone novel. He found the book thought-provoking, prompting questions like: "Is that what nano-tech, 3-D printing and giant data-streams are going to give us? Or are we looking at a 'cyberserf' future?"

In a review at Tor.com, Liz Bourke called After Atlas "a peculiar sort of book". While not strictly a sequel to Planetfall, it has connections to it. The novel presents itself as a "dystopian noir murder mystery", and the connections to its predecessor only become apparent towards to end where it "jumps genres" and the pieces fall into place. Bourke described Newman's writing as "fluid and straightforward". She called Carlos "a striking character", although "a character in isolation". He has an interesting backstory that makes him "odd" and "almost unique", but he forms no close relations with anyone, which, she felt, weakens the narrative. Overall Bourke concluded that while she found After Atlas "interesting" and "entertaining", she opined "it never becomes more than the sum of its parts."

== Works cited ==
- Newman, Emma (2016). After Atlas. New York City: Roc Books. ISBN 978-0-425-28240-3.
