= Night Sky Mine =

1996 novel by Melissa Scott

- First edition
- Author: Melissa Scott
- Cover artist: Nicholas Jainschigg
- Language: English
- Genre: Science fiction
- Publisher: Tor Books
- Publication date: 1996
- Media type: Print
- ISBN: 0-312-85875-2
- OCLC: 38598904

Night Sky Mine is a 1996 science fiction novel by American writer Melissa Scott, set in a future after computer programs have run amok. After the Crash, an interface has been created that portrays programs as various floral, faunal and mythological species, depending on the characteristics of the program. Scott explores this interface between human society and cyberspace, both as a plot device and as back drop for the story.

Ista Kelly was the sole survivor of a pirate raid on a Night Sky mining platform that was searching a remote region of space for useful gases. Now a teenager, she is apprenticed to become a hypothecary with the tools and skills to explore and harvest the hammals, floral and faunal programs of cyberspace. She must navigate the complex relationships among Company, Union, and merchant Travellers as she becomes enmeshed in an undercover operation that could hold the keys to her identity and the mysterious happenings on the computer Net.

== Sources ==
- Hays, Carl. "Adult books: Fiction." Booklist 92.22 (Aug. 1996): 1889.
- Hamburger, Susan. "Book reviews: Fiction." Library Journal 121.13 (Aug. 1996): 119.
- Steinberg, Sybil S. "Forecasts: Fiction." Publishers Weekly 243.30 (22 July 1996): 230.
