= Shadow Magic (Jones and Bennett novel) =

Novel by Jaida Jones and Danielle Bennett

Shadow Magic is a novel by Jaida Jones and Danielle Bennett, the second tome of the Havemercy series.

It follows the story of four characters, however, Volstovic diplomat Alcibiades, gruff officer Caius Greylace, a young aristocratic magician (who happens to be a little bit insane) and Mamoru and Kouje the younger prince of Ke-Han and his personal retainer respectively.

== Reviews ==
- Review by Faren Miller (2009) in Locus, #584 September 2009
- Review by Peter Heck (2010) in Asimov's Science Fiction, June 2010
