= Ginn Hale =

American writer of speculative fiction (born 1968)

- Born: April 23, 1968 (age 58); Hoopa, California, U.S.
- Occupation: Novelist
- Writing career
- Language: English
- Period: 2007 to the present
- Genres: fantasy, science fiction, LGBT romance
- Website: ginnhale.com

Ginn Hale (born April 23, 1968) is an American writer of speculative fiction.

== Early life ==
Hale spent a portion of her early childhood living in an off the grid cabin in California. Her father was fond of inventing humorous story-based games around figures from American History, including the game "Assassinate President Taft."

== Career ==
Her debut book, Wicked Gentlemen (Blind Eye Books, 2007) is made up of two closely connected novellas blending elements of the steampunk, paranormal, gay romance and suspense genres, and won the 2008 Gaylactic Spectrum Award for best novel, in addition to being selected as a finalist for the Lambda Literary Award the same year. She then collaborated with Astrid Amara and Nicole Kimberling on two shared-world anthologies for Loose Id, called Hell Cop and Hell Cop 2. In 2010, she returned to Blind Eye Books to release the Lord of the White Hell (Cadeleonian series) Books One and Two. In 2011, she released a 10-part serialized novel titled The Rifter. In 2014, Hale extended her Cadeleonian series with Books One and Two of Champion of the Scarlet Wolf. She has also published a number of short stories.

== Personal life ==
Hale now resides on the Pacific Northwest coast of the United States with her wife. She is an avid supporter of Best Friends Animal Society.

== Bibliography ==
=== Novels ===
- Wicked Gentlemen (2007): Blind Eye Books - ISBN 978-0-9789861-1-7 (print + ebook)
- Cadeleonian Series
  - Lord of the White Hell (2010): Blind Eye Books
    - Book One - ISBN 978-0-9789861-6-2 (print + ebook)
    - Book Two - ISBN 978-0-9789861-7-9 (print + ebook)
    - Japanese translation: Lord of the White Hell Books One & Two (2014) - translated into Japanese under Chuokoron-Shinsha Inc.’s C-Novels imprint
  - Champion of the Scarlet Wolf (2014): Blind Eye Books
    - Book One - ISBN 978-1-9355603-2-6 (print + ebook)
    - Book Two - ISBN 978-1-9355603-4-0 (print + ebook)
- The Rifter (2011): Blind Eye Books
  - Book One: The Shattered Gates - ISBN 978-1-935560-01-2 (ebook)
  - Book Two: Servants of the Crossed Arrows - ISBN 978-1-935560-01-2 (ebook)
  - Book Three: Black Blades - ISBN 978-1-935560-03-6 (ebook)
  - Book Four: Witches' Blood - ISBN 978-1-935560-04-3 (ebook)
  - Book Five: The Holy Road - ISBN 978-1-935560-05-0 (ebook)
  - Book Six: Broken Fortress - ISBN 978-1-935560-06-7 (ebook)
  - Book Seven: Enemies and Shadows - ISBN 978-1-935560-07-4 (ebook)
  - Book Eight: The Silent City - ISBN 978-1-935560-08-1 (ebook)
  - Book Nine: The Iron Temple - ISBN 978-1-935560-09-8 (ebook)
  - Book Ten: His Holy Bones - ISBN 978-1-935560-10-4 (ebook)
  - Books One to Three: The Shattered Gates - ISBN 978-1-935560234 (print)
  - Books Four to Seven: The Holy Road - ISBN 978-1935560258 (print)
  - Books Eight to Ten: His Sacred Bones - ISBN 978-1935560265 (print)

=== Short stories and novellas ===
- Feral Machines in the anthology Tangle XY: Blind Eye Books - ISBN 978-0-9789861-0-0 (print + ebook)
- Touching Sparks in the anthology Hell Cop (2008) with Astrid Amara and Nicole Kimberling: Loose Id - ISBN 978-1-59632-812-9 (ebook)
- Such Heights in the anthology Hell Cop 2 (2009) with Astrid Amara and Nicole Kimberling: Loose Id - ISBN 978-1-59632-948-5 (ebook)
- Shy Hunter in the anthology Queer Wolf (2009): Queered Fiction - ISBN 978-1-920441-00-5 (print and ebook) and online at http://www.yaoifix.com
- Things Unseen and Deadly (2012): Blind Eye Books - in the anthology Irregulars with Josh Lanyon, Astrid Amara and Nicole Kimberling
