= Michael Hussar =

American painter

- Born: Southern California
- Education: Art Center College of Design
- Known for: Painting
- Notable work: Morphine, Vasoline, Gummer, Daddy's Girl, Cherry Pie, White Rooster, Hans Memling, Lamb of God, White Devil, Flown, Still Life With A Smile, Pope Innocent XXX, Ecstasy of Christ, Rx, Lovers Eye
- Movement: American Baroque (art movement)
- Patrons: Warren Beatty, Leonardo DiCaprio, Francis Ford Coppola, Mark Parker

Michael Hussar is an American painter from Southern California. He was trained at the Art Center College of Design in Pasadena, CA.

== Early life ==
Hussar was born 1964 in Southern California. He first took interest in art because of his father whom he would watch paint and occasionally work alongside him. He began painting when he was 6 years old, although he had been drawing before that. He later studied at the Art Center College of Design in Pasadena, California where he taught painting afterwards.

He was trained by painters Richard Bunkall, Dwight Harmon, and Judy Crook; and draftsmen Harry Carmean and Burne Hogarth. Later on, he taught Portraiture and Head Painting for almost 10 years at ArtCenter and continues to teach portrait painting workshops in the United States and Europe.

== Career ==
Hussar is known best for his oil paintings. Taking influences from the work of the old masters, he uses a combination of rococo, baroque and other classical styles combined with contemporary subject matter.

Instead of canvas, Hussar prefers to work on gessoed wood panels to create paintings, as opposed to a surface mixing technique. He prefers to work from dark value, to light, focusing on atmosphere before moving to detail. His paintings are provocative and shocking from certain angles. He plays around with religious codes, in a universe combining the fantastic and the horrific.

In 2008 Hussar's painting, Hans Memling was featured in the group show In the Land of Retinal Delights: The Juxtapoz Factor that took place at the Laguna Art Museum from June 22 - October 5, 2008.

His clients include Kat Von D, Madonna, Warren Beaty, Francis Ford Coppola and Leonardo DiCaprio. Hussar's work is mainly exhibited in the US. One of his works can also be found in the Library of Congress in Washington, D.C.

== Personal life ==
Hussar lives in Rome, Italy.

== Publications ==
- Featured in Hi Fructose Magazine Volume 12
- Featured in Juxtapoz magazine, Sept/Oct 2005 #58

== Solo exhibitions ==
- Red Red Robin, Nov 11 - Dec 10, 2006, Mendenhall Sobieski Gallery in Pasadena, CA
- Barocca, Dec 5-28, 2003, La Luz de Jesus
- Pretty Pink Spade, Nov 1 - Dec 1, 2002, La Luz de Jesus
