= Planetfall (novel) =

2015 novel by Emma Newman

- First edition cover
- Author: Emma Newman
- Cover artist: Anxo Amarelle
- Language: English
- Series: Planetfall #1
- Genre: Science fiction
- Publisher: Roc Books
- Publication date: November 3, 2015
- Publication place: United States
- Media type: Paperback original
- Pages: 320
- ISBN: 978-0-425-28239-7
- Dewey Decimal: 823/.92—dc23
- LC Class: PR6114.E949P58 2015
- Followed by: After Atlas

Planetfall is a 2015 science fiction novel by British writer Emma Newman. It was first published in the United States as a paperback original in November 2015 by Roc Books, and in the United Kingdom by Gollancz in paperback in February 2018. An audio edition of the book, narrated by Newman, was published in the United States by Blackstone Audio in November 2015, and in the United Kingdom by Orion Publishing in December 2017. Planetfall was Newman's first science fiction novel. It is the first book in Newman's four-book Planetfall series, which she said can be read in any order. It was generally well received by critics, and was shortlisted for the 2016 Gaylactic Spectrum Award for Best Novel. The Planetfall series was nominated for the 2020 Hugo Award for Best Series.

== Premise ==
The protagonist, Renta Gali, is a 3D printer engineer in a colony on a remote planet inhabited by a large bio-mechanical alien structure called "God's City". Writing in "Newfound Futures", Caroline Koegler said Planetfall utilizes "exile from earth" and "planetary exile" science fiction tropes.

== Plot background ==
Planetfall takes place an unspecific number of years into the future. Twenty years before the beginning of the novel, Renata Ghali (Ren) befriends Lee Suh-Mi (Suh) when both women intend to rent the same apartment in Paris. They become fast friends, and Ren falls in love with Suh. While they hike in the Alps, Suh eats a seed from an unidentified plant and falls into a coma. Suh is deeply changed upon awakening, and writes down the location of a planet from which she claims God is calling to her.

Suh recruits 1,000 people for an expedition to the planet, including wealthy marketing executive Cillian Mackenzie (Mac), Suh's son Lee Hak-Kun, and Ren as the chief 3-D printer engineer. The expedition constructs a spaceship called Atlas and travels through space to the unnamed planet. A small group including Suh, Ren, Mac, and Hak-Kun land first and explore a large bio-mechanical alien structure they call "God's City". At the top of the structure, Suh disappears into a room, then returns minutes later in tears claiming that God has died. She removes her helmet and is immediately killed by the toxic air inside God's City.

With Suh's status as "Pathfinder" vital to keeping the colony together, Mac decides to tell everyone that Suh remained in God's City to commune with God. The advance party returns to Atlas, where Hak-Kun disagrees with Mac and prepares to tell everyone about Suh's death. To protect the secret, Mac sabotages Hak-Kun's pod during the second planetfall, apparently killing him and his followers. With Ren sworn to secrecy, Mac establishes a colony at the foot of God's City, and institutes an annual ritual in which the colonists gather to await Suh's return.

== Plot summary ==
The novel opens two decades after the disastrous planetfall, with the colonists still waiting for Suh to return. Still traumatized by her persistent love for Suh and the secret she's forced to keep, Ren has become a loner, compulsively hoarding objects she steals from the colony's recycling systems. She regularly visits God's City on surreptitious research missions.

One day, a young man named Sung-Soo arrives at the colony from the wilderness, claiming to be Suh's grandson. Shaken by the realization that Hak-Kun's group survived, Ren and Mac attempt to integrate Sung-Soo into the colony. Trouble arises when Sung-Soo forces his way into Ren's house and discovers it so full of junk as to be unlivable. Claiming to be concerned for Ren's welfare, Sung-Soo threatens to reveal her mental illness if she doesn't seek help. When she refuses to act, Sung-Soo leads the entire colony to forcibly clean out Ren's house. Deep in the basement, the colonists discover a coffin containing Suh's preserved body, the memory of which Ren had repressed.

The distraught colonists accuse Ren of murdering Suh. To clear her name, Ren broadcasts the video of Suh's death, revealing the deception she and Mac maintained. While the colonists escort Mac and Ren to be imprisoned pending trial, sudden explosions destroy the colony's vital infrastructure. Sung-Soo appears and murders Mac in revenge for banishing him and his family from a comfortable life in the colony. Other survivors attack, acting on Sung-Soo's pre-arranged plan to destroy the colony and return to the wilderness with a few people designated as vital.

Ren flees into God's City. By placing her faith in its creators and removing her protective equipment, Ren adapts to the environment inside the city and passes several trials as she works her way up through the megastructure. At the top, where Suh died twenty years before, Ren enters the final room and discovers an alien body lying on a slab. Evidence in the room suggests that other Pathfinders from other worlds have repeatedly visited the structure thanks to the plants acting as beacons. Having finally laid aside her burdens, Ren replaces the body on the slab, awaiting the next Pathfinders.

=== Technology ===
The colony uses 3D printing to produce almost all of its needs, including building materials, equipment, clothing, food and medicines. The minerals used by the printers are mined in the mountains surrounding the colony, and extracted from the colony's discarded material using the Masher, a recycling machine.

The colonists adapt themselves to live on the planet without environmental suits using biotechnology and genetic engineering. This enables them to breathe the planet's atmosphere and defend themselves against harmful microbes and allergens. They enhance themselves with chips that monitor their health, and neural implants that connect them to the colony's network. With the implants they can record and playback what they see, hear and feel, and communicate with other colonists.

== Background ==
Newman said ideas for Planetfall had been with her for several years. She had wanted to write a story about a person with a mental illness, but the character and setting eluded her. Then she started reading about advances in 3D printing, and in particular an article about using 3D printers to create a Moon base from Moon dust. That gave her what she was looking for, and her character became Renata, a disturbed 3D printer engineer who constructs a colony on a remote planet.

Planetfall was to be Newman's first science fiction novel. Previously she had written three urban fantasy books in her Split Worlds series. She said that despite science fiction being her "first love", she had never attempted to write it. She explained that she felt "intimidated" by science fiction, and was worried she would "get the science wrong" and "screw it up". But once she realized that so long as she does not break any of the fundamental rules of science, she is free to create whatever future she pleases.

Planetfall was originally intended to be a stand-alone novel, but when Newman's publishers bought it, they asked her for a second book, and over the next four years she wrote three more in the Planetfall universe. Newman said the books in the series are largely self-contained, and can be read in any order.

== Reception ==
In a review of Planetfall in The New York Times, American science fiction and fantasy author N. K. Jemisin described Ren as "a rare science fiction protagonist", and complimented Newman on her handling of this "mentally ill" and "unlikable yet poignantly human" character. She noted that while the author's antagonists "doesn't do nearly as well" and "teeter on the line of caricature", Ren's "inner demons are the stars of the show". Jemisin was fascinated how Newman made revealing the lies about Suh more interesting than the lies themselves, and concluded that the book's climax is "cathartic and transcendent enough to smooth over any flaws along the way."

Writing at Tor.com, Robert H. Bedford described Planetfall as "a fascinating character study" that shows just how destructive secrets can be. He said Ren's first-person narrative gives the reader "a very limited perspective" of her world, which makes her voice "haunting" and suggestive of "dread lurking beneath the surface". He added that because Ren is a troubled person, she is an unreliable narrator, and although such narrators are not uncommon in literature, Bedford said Newman "gives new depth to the meaning 'unreliable'". He compared Planetfall to Mary Doria Russell’s novel The Sparrow which also deals with an uneasy truce between science and religion. He was, however, critical of Planetfall's ending, saying that while it is thought-provoking, he felt it a little too "abrupt". But overall Bedford described Newman's book as "[b]eautifully and heartbreakingly wrought" and called it "a distressing, harrowing novel that left a deep mark on me".

American writer Charlie Jane Anders said Planetfall is not your average novel about space colonization. Writing at Gizmodo she described the book as "much weirder", "a fair bit darker", and with as much psychological drama as science fiction. She complimented Newman on her "well-realized world-building" with its realistic portrayal of the inner working of the colony and its advanced technology. But she added that this setting is not what it seems, and it is not too long before the book starts to "mess with your head". The settlement turns out to be "some weird fusion of utopian community and religious pilgrimage", and Ren becomes someone totally unexpected. Anders remarked that Newman's use of a first-person narrator who does not reveal all she knows is "risky", but felt that here, with all its "repressed truths and terrible secrets, it absolutely works and feels natural and honest".

== Works cited ==
- Newman, Emma (2015). Planetfall (e-book ed.). New York City: New American Library. ISBN 978-0-698-40432-8.
