= Jo Graham =

American author (born 1968)

- Born: 1968 (age 57–58); North Carolina
- Occupation: Novelist
- Writing career
- Genre: Historical fiction
- Website: www.livejournal.com/users/jo_graham

Jo Graham (born 1968) is an American author who debuted in 2008 with her novel Black Ships, a re-imagination of The Aeneid. She lives in Maryland.

Black Ships received a star rating when reviewed by Publishers Weekly and was nominated for the 2009 Locus Award for Best First Novel. Her second novel, Hand of Isis (March 2009), which features the reincarnated main character of Black Ships, was given a starred review by Kirkus Reviews.

== Books ==
- Black Ships (Hachette Book Group, 2008) ISBN 978-0-316-06800-0

2009 Locus Award Finalist

- Hand of Isis (Hachette Book Group, 2009) ISBN 978-0-316-06802-4
- Stealing Fire (Orbit, 2010)
- Steel Blues, with Melissa Scott (Crossroad Press, 2013)
- The Emperor's Agent, (Crossroad Press, 2013)
- Cythera, (Supposed Crimes, November 2013)
- Silver Bullet, with Melissa Scott (November 2013)
- Stargate Atlantis: Unascended, with Amy Griswold (Fandemonium, 2014)
- Wind Raker, with Melissa Scott (2014)
- Stargate Atlantis: Third Path, with Melissa Scott (Fandemonium, 2015)
- Oath Bound, with Melissa Scott (2016)
- The Marshal's Lover, (Crossroad Press, 2016)
