= Jaida Jones =

American author

Jaida Jones is an American author. Their most prominent work is the 2008 fantasy novel Havemercy, co-written with Danielle Bennett.

== Biography ==
Jones attended Saint Ann's School from kindergarten through high school. They later studied East Asian languages and cultures at Barnard College. Before becoming a published author, Jones co-wrote a Harry Potter fan fiction story called "The Shoebox Project" which gained a massive following online. It was during this time that Jones met Danielle Bennett in a LiveJournal thread and the two started writing a novel together. The resulting novel, Havemercy, was picked up by Random House for an advance of $30,000 and published in 2008.

In March 2019, Jones and Bennett announced they had sold another book, Master of One, a young adult (YA) fantasy which was published by HarperTeen in November 2020.

== Bibliography ==
=== Poetry ===
- Cinquefoil (as Hannah Jones) (2006, New Babel Books; ISBN 0-9720197-4-X)

=== The Volstovic Cycle ===
- Havemercy (2008, Spectra; ISBN 978-0-553-80696-0)
- Shadow Magic (2009, Spectra; ISBN 978-0-553-80697-7)
- Dragon Soul (2010, Spectra; ISBN 978-0-553-80769-1)
- Steelhands (2011, Spectra; ISBN 978-0-553-80770-7)

=== Other novels ===
- Master of One (2020, HarperTeen; ISBN 978-0-06-294144-2)
