= Suzy McKee Charnas =

American writer (1939–2023)

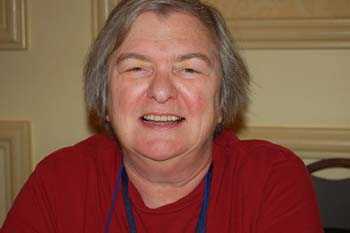
- Charnas in 2006
- Born: October 22, 1939; New York City, New York, U.S.
- Died: January 2, 2023 (aged 83); New Mexico, U.S.
- Occupation: Writer
- Writing career
- Language: English
- Genres: Science fiction and fantasy
- Notable work: The Holdfast Chronicles
- Notable awards: Hugo Award, Nebula Award, James Tiptree Jr. Award, Gaylactic Spectrum Award, Aslan Award
- Website: www.suzymckeecharnas.com

Suzy McKee Charnas (October 22, 1939 – January 2, 2023) was an American novelist and short story writer, writing primarily in the genres of science fiction and fantasy. She won several awards for her fiction, including the Hugo Award, the Nebula Award and the James Tiptree Jr. Award. A selection of her short fiction was collected in Stagestruck Vampires and Other Phantasms in 2004. The Holdfast Chronicles, a four-volume story written over the course of almost thirty years (the first installment, Walk to the End of the World was published in 1974, and the last installment, The Conqueror's Child was published in 1999) was considered to be her major accomplishment in writing. The series addressed the topics of feminist dystopia, separatist societies, war, and reintegration. Another of her major works, The Vampire Tapestry, has been adapted (by Charnas herself) into a play called "Vampire Dreams".

== Life ==
Suzy McKee Charnas was born in Manhattan to two professional artists, Maxine (Szanton) and Robinson McKee. Her father was an illustrator for Wonder Books, a company that made picture books for children, and her mother was a textile designer. Her parents divorced in her childhood. Charnas helped her mother raise one younger sister, who is six years younger than she was. Despite being from a low-income family, Charnas was able to pursue a prestigious education. She attended an arts high school in New York City and, influenced by her parents, even considered pursuing a career in the visual arts. She received her undergraduate degree from Barnard College, where she majored in economics and history. She continued her education at New York University, where she earned a master's degree in education. She taught in Nigeria as a part of the Peace Corps.

== Influences and themes ==
Charnas' work focuses on the sociological and the anthropological—rather than exclusively the technological—dimensions of science fiction. Her background in history and economics, as well as her experiences in Nigeria, have had a profound impact on her work. She had keenly explored the genres of Western, adventure, and science fiction in the books she had read earlier in her life, yet she realized that these books lacked strong female characters. She considered Ursula K. Le Guin's The Left Hand of Darkness to have been a major inspiration for the initiation of her writing career, as it was one of the first feminist novels she had encountered. Despite this, she did not intend to write feminist literature. Her work did not take a feminist slant until after the first draft of "Walk to the End of the World", which she had originally intended to be political satire.

== Controversy ==
When Charnas tried to publish Motherlines, the second installment of the Holdfast Chronicles, she was met with some resistance. According to Charnas in an interview with SnackReads, the company that had published Walk to the End of the World, Ballantine Books, rejected Motherlines because it was deemed inappropriate for what they considered to be their target science fiction audience: young boys. This was because the book contains no male characters, and there are some controversial sexual relationships. Charnas tried to get the work published several times. It was generally rejected not for the quality of the story, but rather its controversial, even radical, themes. One editor even said that he could accept the work- and even that it would be very successful- if all the female characters were changed to men, Charnas alleged. Charnas rejected this offer. The book was finally accepted after one year (which was a long time for science fiction in this era) by editor David G. Hartwell, who went on to publish several of Charnas' other works.

== Personal life and death ==
Charnas lived in New Mexico. She died on January 2, 2023, at the age of 83.

== Awards and critical reception ==
Director Guillermo del Toro assessed Charnas' The Vampire Tapestry as “flawless” on Twitter in 2015, saying later “It may be her masterpiece.” Polly Shulman wrote that "the Holdfast tetralogy offers a fascinating look back at the permutations of the feminist imagination in recent years, and it underlines the ideals and challenges faced by feminists -- sometimes on purpose and sometimes in spite of itself."

She won the 1980 Nebula Award for her psychological vampire novella, Unicorn Tapestry, and the 1990 Hugo Award for her feminist werewolf short story, “Boobs.” She received three Otherwise Awards, two retroactively, for novels in The Holdfast Chronicles series, beginning with 1974's Walk to the End of the World. Charnas was awarded the James Tiptree Jr. Award for The Conqueror's Child" (1999).

The Vampire Tapestry was included in David Pringle's 1988 book, Modern Fantasy: The Hundred Best Novels.

== Works ==
=== Novels ===
- The Vampire Tapestry (1980)
- Dorothea Dreams (1986)
- The Kingdom of Kevin Malone (1993) Winner of the 1994 Aslan Award for the best Children's Literature
- The Ruby Tear (1997)

=== Series ===
- The Holdfast Chronicles (Winner of the 2003 Gaylactic Spectrum Hall of Fame Award)
  - Walk to the End of the World (Ballantine, 1974) Winner of a 1996 Retrospective James Tiptree Jr. Award
  - Motherlines (Berkley, 1978) Winner of a 1996 Retrospective James Tiptree Jr. Award
  - The Furies (Tor, 1994)
  - The Conqueror's Child (Tor, 1999) Winner of the 1999 James Tiptree Jr. Award
- Sorcery Hall
  - The Bronze King (1985) (Illustrated by Anne Yvonne Gilbert in 1988)
  - The Silver Glove (1988) (Illustrated by Anne Yvonne Gilbert)
  - The Golden Thread (1989) (Illustrated by Anne Yvonne Gilbert)

=== Collections ===
- Moonstone and Tiger-Eye (1992)
- Music of the Night (2001) ebook
- Stagestruck Vampires and Other Phantasms (2004, Tachyon Publications)

=== Non-fiction ===
- Strange Seas (2001) ebook
- My Father's Ghost (2002)

=== Notable short stories ===
- "Unicorn Tapestry" (1980) Winner of the 1980 Nebula Award for the best novella
- "Scorched Supper on New Niger" (1980)
- "Listening to Brahms" (1988)
- "Boobs" (1989) Winner of the 1990 Hugo Award for the best short story
- "Beauty and the Opera or the Phantom Beast" (1996)
- "Peregrines" (2004)

=== Play ===
- "Vampire Dreams" (2001) Broadway Play Publishing Inc.

== General and cited sources ==
- Clute, John and Peter Nicholls. The Encyclopedia of Science Fiction. New York: St. Martin's Griffin, 1993 (2nd edition 1995). ISBN 0-312-13486-X.
- Gordon, Joan, and Suzy McKee Charnas. “Closed Systems Kill: An Interview with Suzy McKee Charnas.” Science Fiction Studies 26, no. 3 (November 1, 1999): 447–468.
- Cavalcanti, Ildney. "The Writing of Utopia and the Feminist Critical Dystopia: Suzy McKee Charnas’s Holdfast Series". In Dark Horizons: Science Fiction and the Dystopian Imagination. New York: Routledge, 2003.
- Mohr, Dunja M. Worlds Apart: Dualism and Transgression in Contemporary Female Dystopias. Jefferson, NC: McFarland, 2005. Extensive chapter on Holdfast series, exclusive interview on the Holdfast series.
- Suzy McKee Charnas Interview, Part 1, from SnackReads, 2013. https://www.youtube.com/watch?v=nOCUjVOp0us.
- Suzy McKee Charnas Interview, Part 2, from SnackReads, 2013. https://www.youtube.com/watch?v=Uay-bULF-tg.
