= Emma Newman =

British author and podcaster

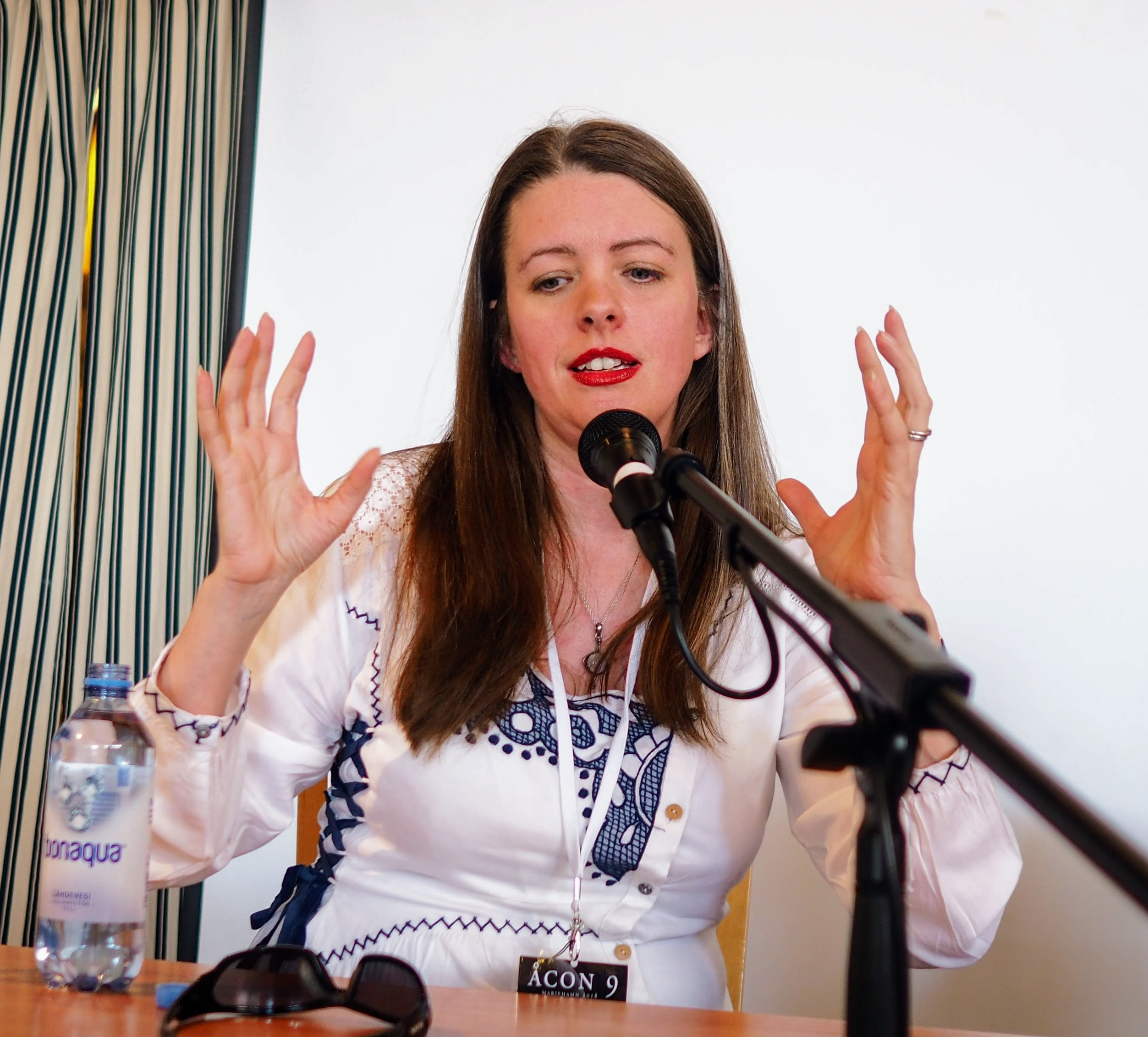
- Newman at Åcon 2018
- Occupations: Writer; podcaster
- Spouse: Peter Newman
- Writing career
- Language: English
- Period: 2011 – Present
- Genres: Science fiction, fantasy
- Notable work: Planetfall
- Website: www.enewman.co.uk

Emma Newman is a British science fiction and fantasy writer, podcaster and audiobook narrator. Her award nominations include the British Fantasy Award (categories: "best fantasy novel", "best newcomer") for Between Two Thorns in 2014 and the Arthur C. Clarke Award for After Atlas in 2017. Her Planetfall series was nominated for the 2020 Hugo Award for Best Series.

== Career ==
Newman has published eleven novels and a collection of short fiction.

She is the co-creator, with her husband Peter Newman, of the Hugo Award winning podcast Tea and Jeopardy. The podcast has over 70 episodes and revolve around Emma hosting another creator for a nice cup of tea and cake, while her scheming butler Latimer (played by Peter Newman) attempts to send them to their deaths at the end of the episode.

In 2025, with Adrian Tchaikovsky, she launched a new podcast, Starship Alexandria. In this the presenters alternate presenting a work (novel, film, comic book) for the other to read and judge whether the work should be preserved for posterity.

Audiobooks narrated by Newman include some of her own work (Planetfall, From Dark Places, Between Two Thorns, Any Other Name, All Is Fair), as well as novels, novellas, and short stories by other authors, largely in the genres of science fiction and fantasy.

== Personal life ==
Her hobbies include live action role-playing and dressmaking. She lives in Somerset, England.

== Selected works ==
=== The Split Worlds – Urban fantasy ===
- Between Two Thorns (2013) ISBN 1-682-30376-4
- Any Other Name (2013) ISBN 1-682-30377-2
- All Is Fair (2013) ISBN 1-682-30378-0
- A Little Knowledge (2016) ISBN 1-682-30291-1
- All Good Things (2017) ISBN 1-682-30616-X

=== Planetfall – Science fiction ===
- Planetfall (2015) ISBN 0-425-28239-2
- After Atlas (2016) ISBN 0-425-28240-6
- Before Mars (2018) ISBN 0-399-58732-2
- Atlas Alone (2019) ISBN 0-399-58734-9
- Before, After, Alone: A Planetfall Universe short story collection (2023) ISBN 1-739-33340-3

=== Industrial Magic – Steampunk ===
- Brother's Ruin (2017) ISBN 0-765-39396-4
- Weaver's Lament (2017) ISBN 0-765-39411-1

=== Short fiction ===
- From Dark Places (2011) ISBN 0-980-74465-2
