= Heather Rose Jones =

American author of fantasy novels

- Jones at San Jose Book Festival 2026
- Education: University of California, Berkeley (PhD)
- Occupation: Author
- Writing career
- Genre: Fantasy
- Notable awards: Gaylactic Spectrum Award (2017)

Heather Rose Jones is an American author of fantasy novels. She received the 2017 Gaylactic Spectrum Award for her novel Mother of Souls, the third novel in her Alpennia series. Previous novels in her Alpennia series, Daughter of Mystery and The Mystic Marriage, were both finalists for the Spectrum Award. Jones published the book Baby Names for Dummies, part of the For Dummies series of instructional manuals, under the pseudonym Margaret Rose.

Jones received a PhD in linguistics from the University of California, Berkeley.

Since August 2016, Jones has presented the Lesbian Historic Motif Podcast subseries of the Lesbian Talk Show.
