= The Holdfast Chronicles =

Series of novels by Suzy McKee Charnas

- Walk to the End of the World (1974); Motherlines (1978); The Furies (1994); The Conqueror's Child (1999)
- Author: Suzy McKee Charnas
- Language: English
- Genre: Science fiction
- Publisher: Ballantine Books
- Published: 1974–1999
- Media type: Print
- No. of books: 4

The Holdfast Chronicles is a series of science fiction books by American author Suzy McKee Charnas.

The series consists of four books:

- Walk to the End of the World (1974)
- Motherlines (1978)
- The Furies (1994)
- The Conqueror's Child (1999).

== Reception ==
Salon.com reviewer Polly Shulman declared that "the Holdfast tetralogy offers a fascinating look back at the permutations of the feminist imagination in recent years, and it underlines the ideals and challenges faced by feminists ..."

== Awards ==
The entire series was inducted into the Gaylactic Spectrum Hall of Fame in 2003. Motherlines and Walk to the End of the World won a retrospective James Tiptree, Jr. Award, and The Conqueror's Child won the award in 1999.

The Furies was nominated for the 1995 Lambda Literary Award for Science Fiction and Fantasy.

== Sources ==
- Mohr, Dunja M. Worlds Apart: Dualism and Transgression in Contemporary Female Dystopias. Jefferson, NC, McFarland, 2005. [extensive chapter on the Holdfast series]
