= Danielle Bennett =

Canadian author

Danielle Bennett is a Canadian author. Her most prominent work is the 2008 fantasy novel Havemercy, co-written with Jaida Jones. Bennett is from Victoria, British Columbia and attended Vic High (graduated 2004) and Camosun College. She met Jones in a LiveJournal thread and the two started writing a novel together. The resulting novel, Havermercy was picked up Random House for an advance of $30,000 and published in 2008.

In March 2019, Jones and Bennett announced they had sold another book, Master of One, which is a young adult (YA) fantasy. Master of One was published by HarperTeen in 2020.

== Bibliography ==
=== The Volstovic Cycle ===
- Havemercy (2008, Spectra; ISBN 978-0-553-80696-0)
- Shadow Magic (2009, Spectra; ISBN 978-0-553-80697-7)
- Dragon Soul (2010, Spectra; ISBN 978-0-553-80769-1)
- Steelhands (2011, Spectra; ISBN 978-0-553-80770-7)

=== Other novels ===
- Master of One (2020, HarperTeen; ISBN 978-0-06-294144-2)
