= Meisha Merlin Publishing =

Defunct American specialty publisher

- Status: Defunct
- Founded: 1996
- Founder: Stephen Pagel, Kevin Murphy and Brian Murphy
- Country of origin: United States
- Headquarters location: Decatur, Georgia
- Publication types: Books
- Fiction genres: fantasy and science fiction

Meisha Merlin Publishing was an independent publishing company founded in 1996 by former New York book editor Stephen Pagel and Kevin and Brian Murphy. The Decatur, Georgia–based company specialized in publishing fantasy and science fiction trade hardcover and trade paperback books. Certain titles were also published in deluxe, signed and numbered slipcased and signed and lettered limited editions.

During its nine years of operation, Meisha Merlin built a large stable of fantasy and science fiction authors that included Kevin J. Anderson, Janny Wurts, Jack McDevitt, the late Robert Lynn Asprin, Robin Wayne Bailey, Storm Constantine, S. P. Somtow, Lee Killough, Phyllis Eisenstein, Allen Steele, Andre Norton, George R. R. Martin, Robert A. Heinlein, and many others. Its books were sold online and through national chain bookstores and independent booksellers throughout the United States, including Internet giant Amazon.com.

In April 2007 Meisha Merlin announced on its website that it would cease operations the following month; no further business details were disclosed.
