= Peg Kerr =

American fantasy author

- Born: 28 April; Chicago, Illinois, U.S.
- Occupation: Author
- Children: 2
- Writing career
- Period: 1987–present
- Genre: fantasy

Peg Kerr (born 28 April of undisclosed year) is an American fantasy author.

== Biography ==
She was born in a suburb of Chicago and moved to Minnesota to attend St. Olaf College. She received an M.A. in English Literature in 1990, specializing in speculative fiction. She lives with her two daughters in Minneapolis; she and her daughters are students of the martial arts. Her husband, Robert F. Ihinger, died in 2018.

Kerr has been publishing short fiction since 1987 and attended the Clarion Workshop in 1988; her stories have been published in Tales of the Unanticipated, Amazing Stories, Weird Tales, The Magazine of Fantasy and Science Fiction and several anthologies.

Kerr's first novel Emerald House Rising was published in 1997 by Warner Aspect, and received praise for the degree of care and detail with which it treated the subjects of jewelry crafting and gemcutting, as well as the unusual sociology she constructed around them.

Her second novel The Wild Swans, based in part on Hans Christian Andersen's classic fairy tale The Wild Swans, was published in 1999. It was praised by many notable figures in the genre, including Lois McMaster Bujold and Jane Yolen, and was nominated for a Mythopoeic Fantasy Award for Adult Literature as well. Charles de Lint placed it "among the very best contemporary retellings of fairy tales, those that retain the old charm and magic of the original, but use the classic material to illuminate elements of our life in the real world."
