= Lisa A. Barnett =

American writer, novelist

- Born: August 24, 1958; Boston, Massachusetts, U.S.
- Died: May 2, 2006 (aged 47); Portsmouth, NH, U.S.
- Education: Boston Latin Academy; University of Massachusetts Boston
- Occupation: Writer
- Partner: Melissa Scott
- Writing career
- Genre: Science fiction
- Notable awards: Lambda Literary Award

Lisa Anne Barnett (August 24, 1958 – May 2, 2006) was an American Lambda Literary Award winning science fiction writer.

== Early life ==
Barnett was born and raised in Dorchester, Boston, where she attended Girls' Latin School (now Boston Latin Academy). She had two sisters and a brother. She graduated from the University of Massachusetts Boston with a bachelor's degree in English, and was a member of the Piscataqua Obedience Club, a volunteer with EPONA (Equine Protection of North America) and senior editor at Heinemann in Portsmouth, New Hampshire. She worked at Baker's Plays before being hired as an editor at Heinemann Publishing in 1988.

== Personal life ==
Barnett lived in Portsmouth, New Hampshire, with her partner of more than two decades, author Melissa Scott.

== Death ==
Barnett died from breast and brain cancer on May 2, 2006 in Portsmouth, New Hampshire.

== Works ==
All co-authored with Melissa Scott:

=== Novels ===
- Barnett, Lisa A.; Scott, Melissa (1988). The Armor of Light. Baen Books. ISBN 978-0-671-69783-9.
- Barnett, Lisa A.; Scott, Melissa (1995). Point of Hopes: A Novel of Astreiant. Lethe Press. ISBN 978-1-59021-312-4.
- Barnett, Lisa A.; Scott, Melissa (2001). Point of Dreams: A Novel of Astreiant. Lethe Press. ISBN 978-1-59021-313-1. 2001 winner of the Lambda Literary Award for science fiction, fantasy and horror

=== Short fiction ===
- The Carmen Miranda Gambit (1990)
