= Melissa Scott =

American writer (born 1960)

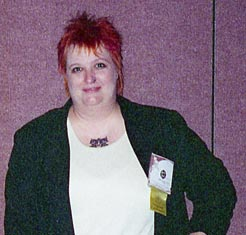
- Bucconeer 1998
- Born: 1960 (age 65–66); Little Rock, Arkansas, U.S.
- Occupations: Novelist, short story writer
- Writing career
- Genres: fantasy, science fiction, genre fiction

Melissa Scott (born 1960) is an American science fiction and fantasy author noted for her science fiction novels featuring LGBT characters and elaborate settings.

== Biography ==
Scott was born 1960, in Little Rock, Arkansas, studied history at Harvard College and Brandeis University, and earned her PhD in comparative history. She published her first novel in 1984, and has since written some two dozen science fiction and fantasy works, including three co-authored with her partner, Lisa A. Barnett.

Scott's work is known for elaborate and well-constructed settings. While many of her protagonists are gay, lesbian, bisexual or transgender, critic Phyllis Betz notes that the characters' genders or orientations are rarely a major focus of Scott's stories. Shadow Man, alone among Scott's works, focuses explicitly on issues of sexuality and gender.

She won the John W. Campbell Award for Best New Writer in Science Fiction in 1986, and has won several Lambda Literary Awards.

In addition to writing, Scott also teaches writing, offering classes via her website and publishing a writing guide.

Scott lived with her partner, author Lisa A. Barnett, in Portsmouth, New Hampshire for 27 years, until the latter's death of breast cancer on May 2, 2006.

== Bibliography ==
- The Game Beyond, 1984
- The Silence Leigh trilogy
  - Five-Twelfths of Heaven, 1985
  - Silence in Solitude, 1986
  - The Empress of Earth, 1987
- A Choice of Destinies, 1986
- The Kindly Ones, 1987
- The Armor of Light, with Lisa A. Barnett, 1988
- Mighty Good Road, 1990
- Dreamships, 1992
- Burning Bright, 1993
- Trouble and Her Friends, 1994
- Shadow Man, 1996
- Night Sky Mine, 1996
- Dreaming Metal, 1997, a continuation from Dreamships
- The Shapes of Their Hearts, 1998
- The Jazz, 2000
- Astreiant
  - Point of Hopes, with Lisa A. Barnett, 1995
  - Point of Dreams, with Lisa A. Barnett, 2001
  - Point of Knives, 2012
  - Fairs' Point, 2014
  - Point of Sighs, 2018
  - Point of Hearts, 2025
- The Order of the Air
  - Lost Things, with Jo Graham, 2012
  - Steel Blues, with Jo Graham, 2013
  - Silver Bullet, with Jo Graham, 2014
  - Wind Raker, with Jo Graham, 2015
  - Oath Bound, with Jo Graham, 2015
- Julian Lynes and Ned Mathey
  - Death by Silver, with Amy Griswold, 2013
  - A Death at the Dionysus Club, with Amy Griswold, 2014
- Firstborn, Lastborn
  - Finders, 2018
- Novels based in the Star Trek universe
  - Proud Helios (Star Trek: Deep Space Nine)
  - The Garden (Star Trek: Voyager)
- Novels based in the Stargate Atlantis universe
  - Homecoming, with Jo Graham, 2010 (book 1 of the Legacy series)
  - Allegiance, with Amy Griswold, 2011 (book 3 of the Legacy Series)
  - Secrets, with Jo Graham, 2012 (book 5 of the Legacy Series)
  - The Inheritors, with Jo Graham, 2013 (book 6 of the Legacy Series)
  - Third Path, 2015 (book 8 of the Legacy Series)
- Novels based in the Stargate SG-1 universe
  - Moebius Squared, with Jo Graham, 2012
  - Ouroboros, 2013
- Novels based on gen:Lock
  - Storm Warning, 2020

=== Nonfiction ===
- Conceiving the Heavens: Creating the Science Fiction Novel (1997)
