= The Mammoth Book of Golden Age Science Fiction =

1989 collection of sci-fi literature

The Mammoth Book of Golden Age Science Fiction: Short Novels of the 1940s
- Cover of first edition
- Editors: Isaac Asimov; Martin H. Greenberg; Charles G. Waugh
- Cover artist: Bob Layzell
- Language: English
- Series: The Mammoth Book of ... Science Fiction
- Genre: Science fiction
- Publisher: Robinson
- Publication date: 1989
- Publication place: United Kingdom
- Media type: Print (paperback)
- Pages: 504
- ISBN: 1-85487-017-3
- Preceded by: The Mammoth Book of Classic Science Fiction
- Followed by: The Mammoth Book of Vintage Science Fiction

The Mammoth Book of Golden Age Science Fiction: Short Novels of the 1940s is a themed anthology of science fiction short works edited by Isaac Asimov, Martin H. Greenberg, and Charles G. Waugh, the second in a series of six samplers of the field from the 1930s through the 1980s. It was first published in trade paperback by Robinson in 1989, and reissued in 2007. The first American edition was published in hardcover and trade paperback by Carroll & Graf, also in 1989; a second trade paperback edition appeared in 2007. In 1991 Galahad Books issued two hardcover editions under the variant titles Great Tales of the Golden Age of Science Fiction and Science Fiction: Classic Stories from the Golden Age of Science Fiction; under the latter title it reissued the book in August 2000, April 2004 and March 2010.

The book collects ten novellas and novelettes by various science fiction authors that were originally published between 1941 and '47 — often considered the "Golden Age of Science Fiction" — together with an introduction ("The Age of Campbell") by Asimov.

== Contents ==
- "Introduction: The Age of Campbell" (Isaac Asimov)
- "Time Wants a Skeleton" (Ross Rocklynne)
- "The Weapons Shop" (A. E. van Vogt)
- "Nerves" (Lester del Rey)
- "Daymare" (Fredric Brown)
- "Killdozer!" (Theodore Sturgeon)
- "No Woman Born" (C. L. Moore)
- "The Big and the Little" (Isaac Asimov)
- "Giant Killer" (A. Bertram Chandler)
- "E for Effort" (T. L. Sherred)
- "With Folded Hands ..." (Jack Williamson)
