= The Dreaming Jewels =

1950 novel by Theodore Sturgeon

- Cover of first edition (hardcover)
- Author: Theodore Sturgeon
- Language: English
- Genre: Science fiction
- Publisher: Greenberg
- Publication date: 1950
- Publication place: United States
- Media type: Print (hardback & paperback)
- Pages: 217
- Followed by: More Than Human

The Dreaming Jewels (1950), also known as The Synthetic Man, is a science fiction novel by American writer Theodore Sturgeon. It was his first published novel.

== Plot summary ==
Eight-year-old Horton "Horty" Bluett runs away from his abusive family, carrying only a smashed jack-in-the-box named Junky. Disguised as a girl, Horty takes refuge among the "strange people" in a traveling circus. The owner of the carnival, Pierre Monetre, is a disgraced doctor and scientist with a deep hatred of mankind. Having discovered intelligent nonhuman life in the form of crystal-like jewels, Monetre works to unlock the source of their great power and, ultimately, destroy mankind. Zena, a carnival performer, takes Horty under her wing. She knows that Horty is the key to executing Monetre's destructive plan, and the only one powerful enough to stop him.

== Reception and significance ==
Science fiction anthologist Groff Conklin characterized it as "a moving and brilliant piece of imaginative writing." Science fiction editors Anthony Boucher and J. Francis McComas praised it as "a warm and beautifully human story . . . fresh, creative imaginative literature." Science fiction writer P. Schuyler Miller found The Dreaming Jewels "compulsively fascinating . . . recommended as much for its people and the way it is written as for the ramifications of the plot."

Science fiction author Damon Knight, however, faulted the novel as "curiously uneven." While he praised the novel's opening half -- "Sturgeon at his brilliant best: the warm insight, the compellingly real background, the exciting narrative"—he felt the work deteriorated sharply as it closed: "the characters become insipid and lifeless, the writing flat, and the action a humorless copy of Victorian melodrama."

In 2001 The Dreaming Jewels was nominated for a Retro Hugo for best novella.

In 2010 fantasy writer Jo Walton described it as "a remarkably sophisticated novel for 1950" and wrote that "This book is so much more than the sum of its tropes that it's possible to read it and re-read it without realising that they are standard tropes." Similarly, in The Encyclopedia of Science Fiction, critic John Clute calls The Dreaming Jewels one of Sturgeon's "most famous" and "three best" novels (alongside More Than Human and The Cosmic Rape), and describes it as "an enjoyable and sophisticated Young Adult tale."

== Publication history ==
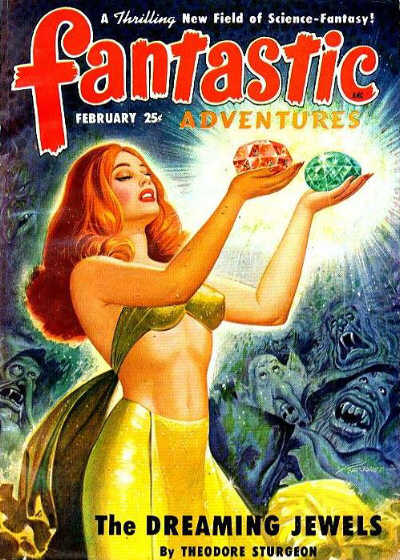
An early version of "The Dreaming Jewels" (described as a "complete novel") was the cover story in the February 1950 issue of Fantastic Adventures.

The novel first appeared in Fantastic Adventures in 1950 before a revision was printed in book form. It has since had numerous reprints, notably a 1953 Italian translation and a 1957 Pyramid Books reprint under the title The Synthetic Man.
