= The Mammoth Book of Vintage Science Fiction =

Anthology of 1950s short novels

The Mammoth Book of Vintage Science Fiction: Short Novels of the 1950s
- Cover of first edition
- Editors: Isaac Asimov; Martin H. Greenberg; Charles G. Waugh
- Cover artist: Peter Andrew Jones
- Language: English
- Series: The Mammoth Book of ... Science Fiction
- Genre: Science fiction
- Publisher: Robinson
- Publication date: 1990
- Publication place: United Kingdom
- Media type: Print (paperback)
- Pages: 503
- ISBN: 1-85487-068-8
- Preceded by: The Mammoth Book of Golden Age Science Fiction
- Followed by: The Mammoth Book of New World Science Fiction

The Mammoth Book of Vintage Science Fiction: Short Novels of the 1950s is a themed anthology of science fiction short works edited by Isaac Asimov, Martin H. Greenberg, and Charles G. Waugh, the third in a series of six samplers of the field from the 1930s through the 1980s. It was first published in trade paperback by Robinson in 1990. The first American edition was issued in trade paperback by Carroll & Graf in the same year.

The book collects ten novellas and novelettes by various science fiction authors that were originally published in the 1950s, together with an introduction by Asimov.

== Contents ==
- "Introduction: The Age of the Troika" (Isaac Asimov)
- "Flight to Forever" (Poul Anderson)
- "The Martian Way" (Isaac Asimov)
- "Second Game" (Katherine MacLean and Charles V. De Vet)
- "Dark Benediction" (Walter M. Miller Jr.)
- "The Midas Plague" (Frederik Pohl)
- "The Oceans Are Wide" (Frank M. Robinson)
- "... And Then There Were None" (Eric Frank Russell)
- "Baby Is Three" (Theodore Sturgeon)
- "Firewater" (William Tenn)
- "The Alley Man" (Philip José Farmer)
