= Mutants in fiction =

Mutants appearing in fictional stories

The concept of a mutant is a common trope in fiction. The new phenotypes that appear in fictional mutations generally go far beyond what is typically seen in mutants in reality, and often result in the mutated life form exhibiting superhuman abilities or qualities.

== Role in cultural perceptions ==
Scholars have argued that mutants in fiction have been used as a device that reflect broader cultural perceptions surrounding technoscience topics. Mutants' depiction in fictional media has often followed global events that have sparked mass public concern, such as events spreading radioactive material and developments in genetic engineering. Furthermore, it is argued that fictional mutants stemming from these events symbolize public perceptions associated with scientific advancement. For example, in the 1954 film Them! ants mutate into civilization threatening monsters as a result of atomic bomb testing in New Mexico. The film's release follows real world atomic bomb testing that took place at the Trinity Site in New Mexico.

== In print media ==
=== Comics ===
- In DC Comics, metahumans are humans who gain superpowers from the metagene, a gene which is often activated by external factors. However, the metagene can also manifest at birth. Captain Comet gained superpowers at birth when a comet activated his metagene, which manifested by the time he was eight.
- In Marvel Comics, genetic mutation has been used as an explanation for super-powers since the 1950s. Mutants have played a major role in Marvel Comics, particularly the X-Men and related series. In the Marvel Comics universe, mutants are a minority who are largely feared and discriminated against by the public. Marvel Comics makes clear distinctions between mutants and 'mutates', beings who gain superpowers by external means.

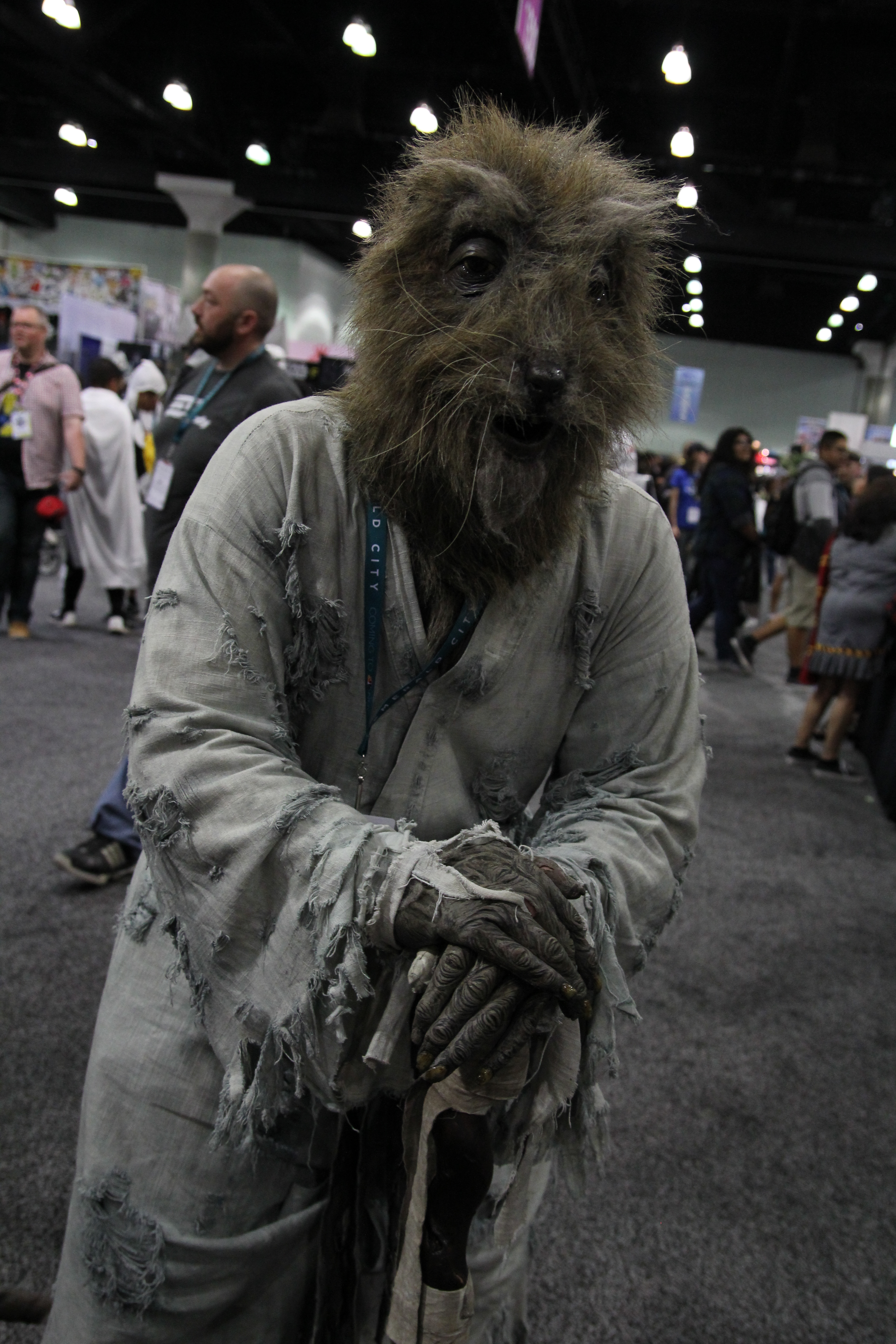
Splinter from the Teenage Mutant Ninja Turtles franchise is a mutant rat

- In the Teenage Mutant Ninja Turtles franchise, mutants are creatures who were evolved by interaction with mutagen, an alien ooze. In the original comics, the mutagen simply evolves animals into anthropomorphic forms. In some adaptations, such as the 1987 and 2012 animated series, the mutagen hybridizes whoever is exposed to it with the DNA of the organism they last touched.

=== Literature ===
- In Foundation and Empire (1952) by Isaac Asimov, a "mutant" named The Mule possesses the ability to sense and manipulate the emotions of others. He uses this ability to subjugate people in his attempt to conquer the galaxy.
- In Children of the Atom (1953) by Wilmar H. Shiras, the children of workers who were exposed to a radioactive explosion give birth to children with a high intelligence.
- In The Hunger Games, the mutants bred by the Capitol are called "muttations" or "mutts". They include jabberjays, birds that can copy speech, tracker jackers, a vicious wasp specimen, orange monkeys with claws like switchblades, and wolf mutts. Also, there are mockingjays, hybrids of jabberjays and mockingbirds that can copy songs.
- In The Chrysalids by science fiction author John Wyndham, a post-apocalyptic, fundamentalist society views genetic mutation as a blasphemy and the work of the Devil; not realizing it is the result of radiation from a world-wide nuclear war that occurred over a thousand years before. In order to prevent another tribulation, they follow a strict eugenics policy. Individuals considered deviations are either killed or sterilized and banished. The protagonist, a boy named David, can communicate telepathically with a small group of other children. However, David and his friends must keep their abnormal abilities secret or risk death or banishment.
- In the espionage novel Performance Anomalies, by Victor Robert Lee, the protagonist Cono 7Q is investigated by geneticists at Stanford University who determine that his accelerated nervous system is due to mutations on the long (q) arm of his seventh chromosome. They cite mutations in the brain-related genes timeless, FoxP2, and STX1A, and perhaps others as underlying Cono 7Q's ability to perceive high-speed events and react to them with a rapidity not seen in normal humans.

=== Other print media ===
- A December, 1953 article in Mechanix Illustrated Magazine called "How Nuclear Radiation Can Change Our Race", warned that in the event of an "Atom War", a mutant species of supermen might arise to assist—or to dominate—humanity. The article was written by "O. O. Binder", and opened with a two-page illustration drawn by comic book artist Kurt Schaffenberger, which shows bald, large-craniumed mutants either helping humanity with their superior intellects (in a small section of the picture) or dominating mankind as slavemasters (in the much bigger splash image).
- The Mutant Chronicle novels are based on a tabletop role-playing game originally published in 1993. It was made into a film (which has very little to do with the novels or the RPG) entitled Mutant Chronicles in 2009.

== In film and television ==
=== Television ===
- Leela in the animated sitcom series Futurama initially believes herself to be an alien. In the episode "Leela's Homeworld", it is revealed that she is actually a mutated human; being the least unusual-looking of any mutant on 31st century Earth (where mutants are shunned and forced to live underground), her parents sent her to New New York as an infant and presented her as an alien.
- In Power Rangers Time Force, Ransik, his daughter Nadira, and several of their servants are mutants.

=== Films ===
- In Total Recall, the early settlers of Mars who were exposed to space radiations because of cheaply-made domes gave birth to mutants, and many of them have gained supernatural powers, including psychic ability. The mutants fight against the forces of planetary administrator Vilos Cohaagen, and organized a rebellion led by Kuato, a humanoid psychic who hides in the belly of his conjoined brother.
- In The Hills Have Eyes, the Mutants or Hill People are humans with misshapen bodies due to radiation exposure from nuclear weapons testing.
- In the Wrong Turn franchise, the Odet family are a mutated clan of incestuous cannibals whose bodies have been physically altered by toxic waste.
- In Chernobyl Diaries, the Mutants were the results of humans exposed to the radiation leaked during the Chernobyl disaster. The Ukrainian government has been keeping quiet about the incident and would often dispose of any surviving witnesses by locking them up in a room containing one of the mutants as seen at the end of the movie.
- In Judge Dredd, set in a post-apocalyptic dystopia, the Angel Gang is composed of religious and cannibalistic mutants affected by the radiations of the atomic wars. In the 2012 reboot, the parents of Cassandra Anderson died of cancer from the exposure to the Cursed Earth's radiations while she was born physically healthy with innate telepathic powers.
- The Mutants are among the creatures that appear in The Cabin in the Woods. When five college students find a assortment of different items in the basement, one of them contains a gas mask and tonics that if tampered with can summon the Mutants.
- In Pandorum, the "Hunters" are the mutated offspring of the passengers of a deteriorating generation ship that have been prematurely awakened from suspended animation and forced to cannibalism. The mutation is attributed to an enzyme the passengers were given which was intended to help them adapt to the life on a new planet, instead they adapted to the savage conditions on the dark ship.
- In Beneath the Planet of the Apes, mutants are the children of the survivors of the nuclear holocaust that turned the Earth into the planet of the apes, and they live under the Forbidden Zone and worship the Alpha-Omega bomb, a doomsday device. Due to the radiation exposure, the mutants developed telepathic powers which they use to create hallucinations to scare the apes off and alternatively force their prisoners to fight to death against their will.
- In The Toxic Avenger and its animated adaptation Toxic Crusaders, "Toxie" and his friends are deformed mutants of super-human size and strength whose mutations are the results of exposure to toxic waste, radiation, and other environmental pollutants.
- In the Bollywood film Krrish 3, many mutants appeared. These mutants were called Maanvars, created by an evil scientist named Kaal.
- In Sign Gene: The First Deaf Superheroes, the mutants happened to be deaf and have superhuman powers through the use of sign language. The leading character Tom Clerc is the fourth great-grandson of Laurent Clerc, the father of American Sign Language.
- In the 1955 science fiction film This Island Earth, the character Exeter is badly injured by a Mutant while fleeing the planet Metaluna aboard a flying saucer, accompanied by other characters Cal and Ruth. The Mutant has also boarded the saucer and attacks Ruth, but dies as a result of pressure differences on the journey back to Earth.
- In Jurassic World Rebirth, a giant mutant Tyrannosaurus dubbed Distortus rex escapes from containment and attacks a group of humans visiting the island it resides on 10 years later.

== See also ==
- Genetic engineering in science fiction
