= Time viewer =

Device in science fiction

In science fiction, a time viewer, temporal viewer, or chronoscope is a device that allows another point in time to be observed. The concept has appeared since the late 19th century, constituting a significant yet relatively obscure subgenre of time travel fiction and appearing in various media including literature, cinema, and television. Stories usually explain the technology by referencing cutting-edge science, though sometimes invoking the supernatural instead. Most commonly only the past can be observed, though occasionally time viewers capable of showing the future appear; these devices are sometimes limited in terms of what information about the future can be obtained. Other variations on the concept include being able to listen to the past but not view it.

One reason authors may choose to write about time viewers rather than time machines is to circumvent the issue of temporal paradoxes. Recurring applications include studying history, solving crimes, and entertainment in the form of displaying historic events to an audience. Because the past includes events as recently as the previous second, privacy may be compromised by such devices; several stories explore the implications thereof. Other stories examine the effects of being observed by onlookers further into the future. An unanticipated influence on past events is a common motif in stories about time viewers, and exploiting this side-effect appears in some stories.

== Concept ==
In its most basic form, a time viewer is a device that only allows the observation of the past. Unlike with a time machine, the user is not transported from one moment in time to another. Under the strictest definition it cannot alter the past; however, the unexpected discovery that the device does indeed affect the past is a common motif. Variations on the concept where the future rather than the past is observed are more uncommon but nevertheless appear in multiple works. Another variation involves listening to the past rather than viewing it.

=== Methods ===
In-universe justifications for the ability to observe the past vary, typically corresponding to contemporary scientific developments; time viewers exploit impressions on the aether in the 1926 novel The Vicarion by Gardner Hunting, exotic neutrino properties in the 1956 short story "The Dead Past" by Isaac Asimov, and wormholes in the 2000 novel The Light of Other Days by Stephen Baxter and Arthur C. Clarke. A common explanation involves the finite speed of light and astronomical distances; this method appears in the 1935 short story "The Space Lens" by Donald A. Wollheim, among others. A variation that appears in the 1966 short story "Light of Other Days" by Bob Shaw (later included in the 1972 fix-up novel Other Days, Other Eyes) is using slow glass whose high refractive index means light takes years to pass through it. Supernatural explanations also occur in works like the 1925 short story "A View From a Hill" by M. R. James, where a pair of binoculars are enchanted to show the past, and the 1976 short story "Balsamo's Mirror" by L. Sprague de Camp, where the titular mirror allows a present-day person to view the world through the eyes of one from the past.

== History ==
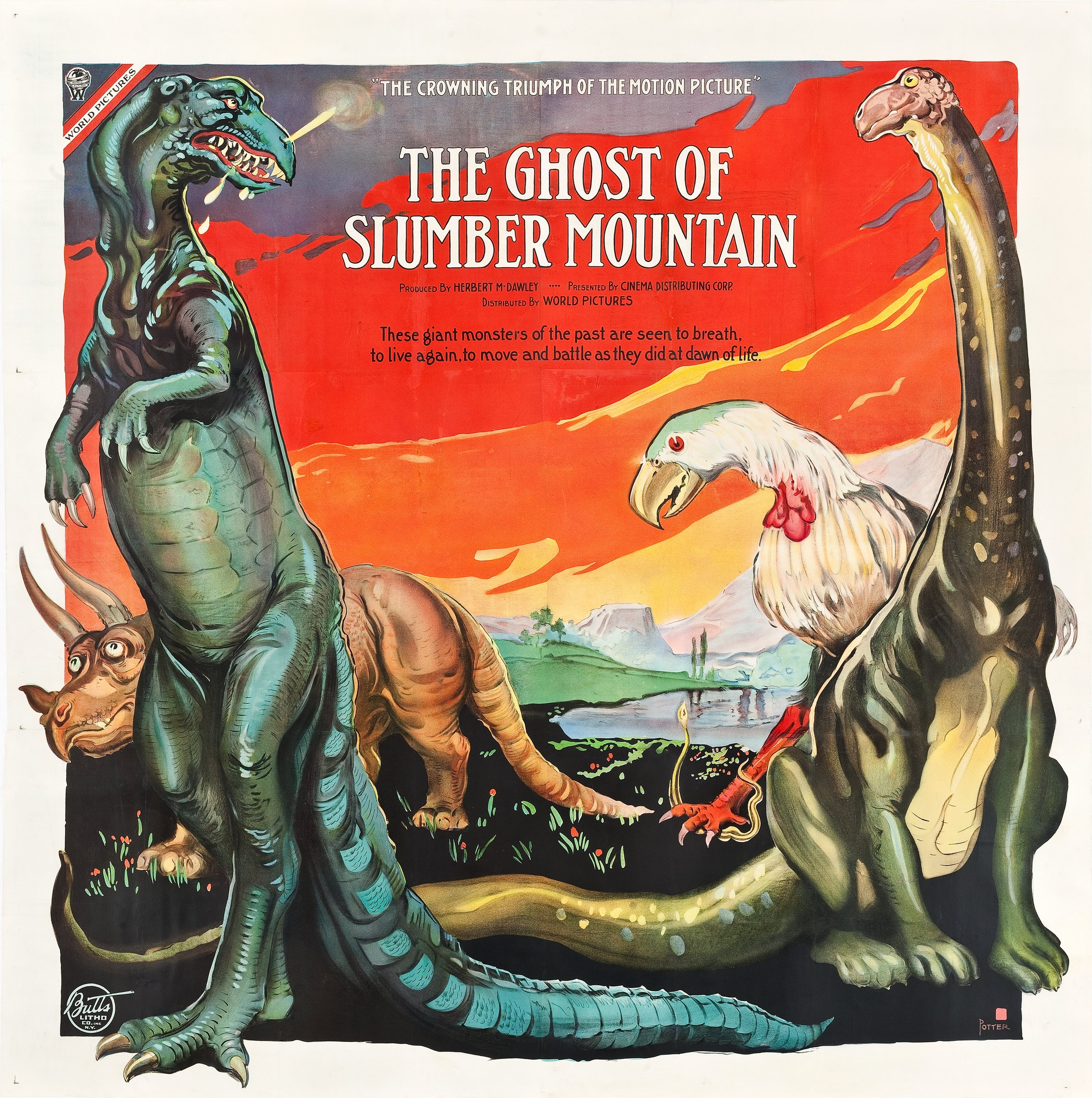
The Ghost of Slumber Mountain (1918) had the first cinematic depiction of a time viewer.

The earliest known example of a fully fledged time viewer in fiction appears in the 1882 short story "L'historioscope" by Eugène Mouton in the form of an electrical telescope, though it was prefigured by a couple of proto-variations on the concept; in the 1872 work Recits de l'infini (which later turned into the 1887 novel Lumen) by Camille Flammarion a spirit accomplishes the same effect by travelling faster than light, and the titular device in the 1873 short story "The Automaton Ear" by Florence McLandburgh enables listening to the past.

In film, the first time viewer appeared in the 1918 film The Ghost of Slumber Mountain. The concept has appeared regularly in works of fiction ever since, creating a sub-genre within time travel fiction, but remained comparatively obscure.

== Narrative function ==
Science fiction author Stephen Baxter identifies several different ways time viewers are used in fiction. The most basic premise is of the time viewer as simply a "neat gadget", with a common variation being something going wrong, typically the past being unintentionally altered. Changing the past on purpose is another recurring application. According to Baxter, the wider implications of the existence of time viewers are sometimes explored in hard science fiction with a PEST (political, economic, social, and technical) analysis.

Several authors consider time viewers to be inherently more plausible than time machines. Science fiction author Damien Broderick says that "using a time viewer is in essence no more absurd than watching a movie made 50 years ago" since the past cannot be affected by it. Baxter similarly says that time viewers are more extrapolation than fantasy, comparing them to archaeological research. For this reason, science writer Paul J. Nahin and physicist Stephen Webb say that a benefit for writers is being able to write time travel stories without needing to consider the possibility of time paradoxes; Nahin nevertheless notes that interacting with the past via a time machine, or even affecting it, does not necessarily cause paradoxes.

== Themes ==
=== Studying history ===
Time viewers are sometimes used to observe moments in history that are similarly popular destinations for time travel in fiction, one example being the crucifixion of Jesus in the 1904 novel Around a Distant Star by Jean Delaire. In the 1956 short story "The Dead Past" by Isaac Asimov, a historian is excited to use a time viewer to study ancient Carthage, only to find out that the device is limited to viewing the most recent 120 years, and a historian uses a time viewer to read the contents of the Library of Alexandria in the 1980 short story "One Time in Alexandria" by Donald Franson.

In the 1938–1939 Trumpets from Oblivion series by Henry Bedford-Jones, a time viewer allows scientists to discover the explanations for various myths, and two war veterans use a time viewer to create historical films in order to dispel public misconceptions about the American Revolution and the American Civil War in the 1947 novelette "E for Effort" by T. L. Sherred. Revealing the truth about historical events also appears in the 1953 novel Childhood's End by Arthur C. Clarke, where alien invaders show humanity that our religions are false.

Astronomy is similarly studied in the 1969 novel Macroscope by Piers Anthony and the 1999 short story "Hatching the Phoenix" by Frederik Pohl. In the former the formation of the Solar System is studied, while in the latter observations are made of a world that has since been destroyed by a supernova. Scientists in the 2000 novel The Light of Other Days by Stephen Baxter and Arthur C. Clarke use time viewer technology to study the entire history of life on Earth.

=== Crimefighting ===
An early instance of a time viewer being used to solve crimes is the 1926 novel The Vicarion by Gardner Hunting, as events leading up to a crime can be uncovered in reverse after the fact. Later examples include the 1948 short story "Private Eye" by Henry Kuttner and C. L. Moore (writing jointly as "Lewis Padgett"), which revolves around a man planning a murder in such a way that the use of a time viewer by the authorities would not reveal his guilt, and the 2006 film Déjà Vu, where the device shows events with a four-day delay which cannot be adjusted and there is consequently only one opportunity to view any given event.

=== Entertainment ===
The 1926 novel The Vicarion by Gardner Hunting is an early example of time viewers being used for entertainment; in the story, moments from history are shown in movie theaters to great public interest. Baxter compares the in-story effects on society, where "mass addiction to this vibrant spectacle quickly overtakes the public", to the later real-world advent of the television. This theme recurs in the 1947 novelette "E for Effort" by T. L. Sherred, though in that story the public is unaware that the films are not conventional movie productions.

=== Privacy and espionage ===
A number of works explore the implications of being capable of remotely viewing the recent past—potentially as recent as less than a second ago—on privacy. In the 1956 short story "The Dead Past" by Isaac Asimov, its use is suppressed by the government for this reason. In the 1972 fix-up novel Other Days, Other Eyes by Bob Shaw, particles of the slow glass that captures images are spread all over to enable mass surveillance. The 1976 short story "I See You" by Damon Knight posits that the complete loss of privacy resulting from universal access to a time viewer would usher in a utopia free from deceit and embarrassment.

Espionage applications appeared early; in the 1926 short story "The Time Eliminator" by pseudonymous author "Kaw", the United States government uses a time viewer to spy on a meeting of foreign leaders. The realization that it can be put to this use triggers war to ensure that it does not in the 1947 novelette "E for Effort" by T. L. Sherred.

The implication that just as we are watching the past, people in the future are surely watching us is explored in the 1951 short story "Operation Peep" by John Wyndham. In order to regain privacy, people eventually resort to shining bright lights to effectively blind the future onlookers. In the 1953 short story "The Parasite" by Arthur C. Clarke, the realization that he is constantly being watched by a future being eventually drives a man to suicide. The intensity of observation from the future is measured in the 1981 short story "The Final Days" by David Langford to gauge an individual's importance to the world of the future.

=== Altering the past ===
Several stories reveal that the time viewer can not only observe the past but influence it. In the 1951 short story "The Biography Project" by H. L. Gold, being constantly watched drives Isaac Newton insane. In the satirical 1948 short story "The Brooklyn Project" by William Tenn, the scientists in charge insist that the past is immutable even as they and their surroundings undergo drastic changes, because from their new perspective those alterations have always been in place.

In some stories, the past is changed intentionally. Humorous depictions include the 1972 short story "The Greatest Television Show on Earth" by J. G. Ballard, where a TV company hires additional people as soldiers to make the Battle of Waterloo live up to viewers' expectations, and the 1967 novel The Technicolor Time Machine by Harry Harrison, which implies that the Viking settlement of Vinland only happened because Hollywood wanted to make a movie about it. A more serious treatment appears in the 1996 novel Pastwatch: The Redemption of Christopher Columbus by Orson Scott Card: after discovering that the past has previously been tampered with, a team of future scientists seek to undo the harm caused by Christopher Columbus's voyages to the New World, even though it would mean their timeline would be obliterated.

== Future time viewers ==
Rarely, time viewers may be depicted as allowing observation of the future rather than the past. Stephen Webb argues that viewing the future has more in common with fantasy and fortune-telling than with science fiction, and David Langford notes in The Encyclopedia of Science Fiction that the possibility of viewing the future has implications for the question of free will versus determinism.

Devices capable of viewing the future have been portrayed in various ways. In the 1922 short story "The Prophetic Camera" by Lance Sieveking, the titular camera can take pictures an adjustable amount of time into the future, while in the 1960 The Twilight Zone episode "A Most Unusual Camera" the device only has a reach of five minutes into the future. In the 1955 novel The Pleasures of a Futuroscope by Lord Dunsany, the device reveals a future nuclear holocaust. In the 1924 short film The Fugitive Futurist a gambler is offered to buy a future-viewing device which he intends to use to find out which horses to bet on, though the device turns out to be fake. The chronoscope in the 1936 short story "Elimination" by John W. Campbell can show both the past and all possible futures.

Future-viewing devices are occasionally limited in what they are able to show rather than being general-purpose. One example is the device in the 1939 short story "Life-Line" by Robert A. Heinlein which can determine an individual's moment of death by measuring the reflection from the future end of that person's world line; a similar device that reveals the manner but not time of death appears in the 2010 anthology Machine of Death: A Collection of Stories About People Who Know How They Will Die by Ryan North, Matthew Bennardo, and David Malki. Another is the instantaneous "Dirac communicator" introduced in the 1954 short story "Beep" by James Blish which due to the lack of a speed-of-light delay can send messages to the past.

== See also ==
- Crystal ball
