= SF Hall of Fame =

SF Hall of Fame may refer to:

- The San Francisco Hall of Fame
- The San Francisco 49ers Hall of Fame
- Science Fiction Hall of Fame (disambiguation)
