= The World Well Lost =

Short story by Theodore Sturgeon

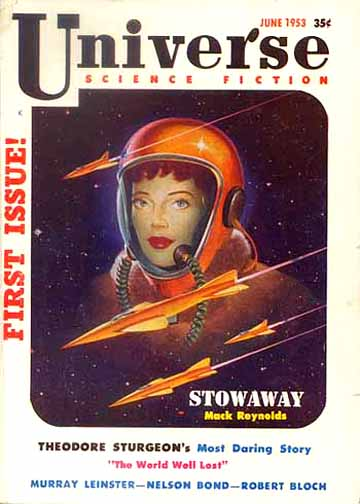
June 1953's issue of Universe.

"The World Well Lost" is a science fiction short story by American writer Theodore Sturgeon, first published in the June 1953 issue of Universe. It has been reprinted several times, for instance in Sturgeon's collections E Pluribus Unicorn, Starshine, and A Saucer of Loneliness. The story takes its title from the subtitle of John Dryden's verse drama All for Love.

== Reception ==
The tagline for the Universe cover was "[His] most daring story". Its sensitive treatment of homosexuality was unusual for science fiction published at that time, and it is now regarded as a milestone in science fiction's portrayal of homosexuality. According to an anecdote related by Samuel R. Delany, when Sturgeon first submitted the story, his editor not only rejected it but phoned every other editor he knew and urged them to reject it as well.

In a postscript to his 1960 novel Venus Plus X, Sturgeon complained that following the publication of "The World Well Lost" he received a great volume of "cards drenched with scent and letters written in purple ink with green capitals." He urged readers of Venus Plus X to "keep [their] troubles to [themselves]", noting that he did not personally identify with the bisexual beings depicted in that novel.

== Plot summary ==
In the future, two members of an alien race called the Dirbanu come to Earth. They win humanity's heart by their grace and love for each other. Earth's media has dubbed them the "Loverbirds", and almost everyone on Earth is touched by the Loverbirds' tender displays of wonder and affection.

Dirbanu heretofore had almost no contact with Earth, except for one short investigative trip in which the ambassador of Dirbanu made clear that he found Earth disgusting. The Dirbanu government breaks the silence with Earth in order to demand the return of the Loverbirds, claiming they are fugitive criminals and must be extradited. Earth's government, hoping to profit by cooperation with this powerful planet, dispatches spacers Rootes and Grunty to return the Loverbirds.

Rootes, the Captain of the team, is an arrogant, loquacious womanizer. Grunty serves under the Captain. He is a hulking, taciturn poet, so-named because he grunts rather than speaks. Despite their radically different personalities, the two friends are famed in space travel circles for their teamwork and efficiency. They refuse to travel with any other spacers. The faster than light propulsion employed by Earthmen has the side-effect of stunning the human nervous system to a variable degree. Rootes is deeply affected, while Grunty is almost unaffected, resulting in an extensive period of time after each "jump" in which Grunty is the only aware entity on the ship, a situation that to him is priceless.

While Rootes sleeps off the first jump, Grunty realizes that the Loverbirds are telepathic and have sensed a deep personal secret of his. Grunty prepares to kill them to protect his secret. To dissuade him from committing murder, the Loverbirds sketch for him a series of four drawings. The first is of Rootes, Grunty, and a beautiful human woman, all clothed. The second depicts all three humans nude. The third sketch depicts the Loverbirds themselves and a short, round extraterrestrial, all clothed. The fourth sketch depicts the three aliens nude.

When viewed in sequence, it becomes clear that the short, round alien is a Dirbanu female; Dirbanu males and females vary vastly from each other in appearance. The two Loverbirds, whom humanity had presumed to be male and female because of their physical similarity to Earth males and females, were actually both male. When Grunty realizes the significance of the sketches, he sets them free in an escape pod. The escape pod heads away from the planet, towards the outer reaches of the universe.

Upon awakening, Rootes is furious that Grunty has seemingly sabotaged the mission. Grunty justifies his actions by showing Rootes the four sketches. Realizing that the Loverbirds were a pair of male lovers, the outraged Rootes declares that he would have killed them if he had known. Grunty, having known this, allows Rootes to think this is why he set the Loverbirds free, avoiding the potential consequences if it were to be discovered that an Earth operative had killed Dirbanu citizens. His anger abated, Rootes is impressed by what he perceives as Grunty's cleverness.

Rootes realizes that the Dirbanu government's reluctance to interact with Earth must be based on homophobia: since human males and females both resemble Dirbanu males, the Dirbanu were presumably disgusted by the impression that Earth is a "planet full of queers". Although the Dirbanu intellectually know that this is not the case, their visceral reaction to the concept nonetheless repels them. Rootes also hypothesizes that the Dirbanu government wanted to bring the Loverbirds home, as they were ashamed to have the Loverbirds viewed as representatives of the Dirbanu planet.

Upon arriving at the Dirbanu homeworld, Rootes reports that the Loverbirds died of natural causes in transit, and the Earth ship is abruptly dismissed, leaving future interactions between the two worlds questionable. On the return trip, with Rootes again fallen unconscious, Grunty ponders him lovingly. The reader, by this point, has realized that Grunty is gay and secretly in love with Rootes. Earlier in the story, the omniscient narrator had noted that the only way to destroy the pair's working bond would be to attempt "to explain it to Rootes". The story's steady reveal of Grunty's sexuality clarifies the full meaning of this statement.
