= E Pluribus Unicorn =

Short story collection by Theodore Sturgeon

- Cover of the first edition, by A. M. Jauss.
- Author: Theodore Sturgeon
- Language: English
- Publisher: Abelard
- Publication date: 1953
- OCLC: 5030580
- LC Class: PZ3.S93562 Eap

E Pluribus Unicorn is a collection of fantasy and science fiction stories by American writer Theodore Sturgeon, published in 1953 by Abelard.

== Contents ==
- "Essay on Sturgeon" by Groff Conklin
- "The Silken-Swift"
- "The Professor's Teddy-Bear"
- "Bianca's Hands"
- "Saucer of Loneliness"
- "The World Well Lost"
- "It Wasn't Syzygy"
- "The Music"
- "Scars"
- "Fluffy"
- "The Sex Opposite"
- "Die, Maestro, Die!"
- "Cellmate"
- "A Way of Thinking"

== Reception ==
The New York Times reviewer Basil Davenport noted that while "Sturgeon's poetic sensitivity sometimes leads him to overwriting, … at his best it gives his work an emotional depth which is all too rare in this field." Boucher and McComas gave the collection an indifferent review, describing it as "a hodgepodge" mixing "Grade A Sturgeon stories" with "a good many one can see no particular reason for collecting"; still, they concluded that Unicorn was "a book belonging in any fantasy library." P. Schuyler Miller praised the collection as "one of the finest short story collections by any writer in the field."
