= Children of the Atom =

1953 novel by Wilmar Shiras

- Dust-jacket from the first edition
- Author: Wilmar Shiras
- Cover artist: Frank Kelly Freas
- Language: English
- Genre: Science fiction
- Publisher: Gnome Press
- Publication date: 1953
- Publication place: United States
- Media type: Print (hardback)
- Pages: 216
- ISBN: 0-9748895-0-4 (Reissue)
- OCLC: 86076125

Children of the Atom is a 1953 science fiction novel by American writer Wilmar H. Shiras, which has been listed as one of "The Most Significant SF & Fantasy Books of the Last 50 Years, 1953–2002." The book is a collection and expansion of three earlier stories, the most famous of which is the novella "In Hiding" from 1948, which appeared on several "Best SF" lists. The book's plot focuses on children with superhuman intelligence.

== Plot summary ==
In the novel, much of which was originally published as a series of stories in Astounding Science Fiction magazine, hidden throughout a future America of 1972 are a group of incredibly gifted children — all approximately the same age, all preternaturally intelligent, and all hiding their incredible abilities from a world they know will not understand them.

These children were born to workers caught in an explosion at an atomic weapons facility, and orphaned just a few months after birth when their parents succumbed to delayed effects from the blast.

The children in the novel are mutants, brought together to explore their unique abilities and study in secret at an exclusive school for gifted children, lest they be hated and feared by a world that would not understand them. The Oakland Tribune described it in 1953 as "the inevitable adjustments and maladjustments of minority genius to majority mediocrity".

In Shiras' book, none of the children are given paranormal super powers such as telekinesis or precognition—their primary difference is simply that of incredible intellect, combined with an energy and inquisitiveness that causes them to figuratively devour every book in their local libraries, to speed through university extension courses, and to publish countless articles and stories all over the world, but all done carefully through pen-names and mail-order, to disguise their youth, and protect them from the prejudicial stereotypes that less intelligent adults continue to try and enforce on children.

== Analysis ==
The book was hailed as another step in science fiction's coming of age, as it focused more in intellectual analysis and less on gadget-driven "space opera"

One reviewer wrote, "What we find here is an inventive updating of Stapledon's famous Odd John (1935) in very sensitive, unsentimental terms, with the addition of a sense of community, a benefit that Stapledon's protagonist never got to fully experience. Shiras tells her story in simple yet affecting prose, a kind of blend of Sturgeon and Simak."

The story, about the incompatibility between the superman and normal humans, strikes a chord with many children, who feel "different from the common herd, neglected, ridiculed, ignored, only to triumph when allied with others of our kind."

Groff Conklin praised the novel for its "richness of character development." Boucher and McComas, however, were disappointed by it, saying that while the stories it was based on were first-rate, the novel-length expansion had become "talkative, oversimplified, lacking in suspense or conflict, and, in short, just not adding up to an adequate novelistic treatment of a splendidly stated theme." P. Schuyler Miller, despite acknowledging that the expansion was less effective than the original work, still concluded that it was "representative of the kind of thing science fiction does well."

== Sources ==
- Chalker, Jack L.; Mark Owings (1998). The Science-Fantasy Publishers: A Bibliographic History, 1923-1998. Westminster, MD and Baltimore: Mirage Press, Ltd. p. 301.
