= A Saucer of Loneliness =

Short story by Theodore Sturgeon

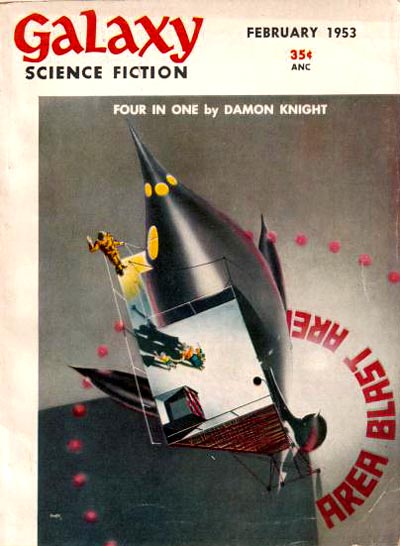
"A Saucer of Loneliness" was originally published in the February 1953 issue of Galaxy.

"A Saucer of Loneliness" is a short story by American writer Theodore Sturgeon that first appeared in Galaxy Science Fiction n. 27 (February 1953). It was adapted as a radio play for X Minus One in 1957, and as the second segment of the twenty-fifth episode (the first episode of the second season, 1986–87) of the television series The Twilight Zone, starring actress Shelley Duvall. In 2004, "A Saucer Of Loneliness" was nominated for a 'Retro Hugo' for Short Story 1954 (Hugo Award for Best Short Story). It was also the title of the seventh book in the anthology series The Collected Short Stories of Theodore Sturgeon, published in 2000. Collected in "The Worlds of Science Fiction, 1963.

== Summary ==
A man sees a woman on the beach one night—he suspects she will attempt suicide. He spots her in the ocean and plunges in to save her. She struggles but he manages to get her ashore. Subsequently, she tells him her story: Years earlier in Central Park she saw a very small flying saucer hovering about her, small enough to put her arms around it. It floated down next to her and touched itself against her forehead for a second and they then both fell to the ground.

While recovering, a small crowd gathers around her. A policeman shows up, the crowd increases in size, and an FBI agent arrives. The girl sits up and says that the saucer spoke to her. The FBI man orders her to shut up and takes both the girl and the now-inanimate saucer into custody. The authorities obtain no information from the saucer or from the girl. They interrogate her about everything but especially about what the saucer had said to her. She refuses to answer, as the saucer was talking only to her, and thinks that it's nobody else's business. Finally, after many months in custody, including jail, she is released.

Even though she is plain and awkward, men ask her out on dates, but only in order to find out what the saucer said to her. Every now and then reporters track her down to ask about the saucer. Finally, she resorted to taking a job as a night cleaner so that no one else will see her. In her loneliness and isolation, she takes to throwing messages in bottles into the ocean. The authorities try to collect all the bottles but eventually give up when they find the same message in each bottle. The message in the bottles is a poem about loneliness.

The man then explains that he found one of her bottles two years ago and has been looking for her ever since. He heard about the bottles hereabouts and that she had quit throwing them, and he had taken to wandering the dunes at night, looking for her. He knew why she threw them, and, when he thinks that she will attempt suicide, he ran all the way. He tells her that he thinks she is beautiful. He also tells her what the saucer said to her—he knows because it is the same message that she has been putting into her bottles:

To the loneliest one...
There is in certain living souls
A quality of loneliness unspeakable
So great it must be shared
As company is shared by lesser beings
Such a loneliness is mine; so know by this
That in immensity
There is one lonelier than you.

"She said nothing, but it was as if a light came from her, more light and far less shadow than the practiced moon could cast. Among the many things it meant was that even to loneliness there is an end, for those who are lonely enough, long enough."

And the meaning of the saucer has become clear: it too was a bottle cast into the interplanetary or galactic sea, by some alien being also consumed by loneliness.

== Twilight Zone episode ==
The TV adaptation differs from the short story in several aspects mostly due to TV storytelling requirements. The woman's loneliness, revealed only gradually in the short story, is obvious from the beginning in the episode. The time frame is shorter. The resolution (the orb) is missing in the short story.

== French TV adaptation ==
In 1982, this short story of Theodore Sturgeon was adapted by the French television, with the title "La soucoupe de solitude" and actress Catherine Leprince playing the main character. The director is Philippe Monnier. The episode itself aired on FR3 (France 3) September 8, 1982.
