= Nerves (Del Rey novella) =

1942 science fiction novella by Lester del Rey

- Title page for Nerves (1956 edition)
- Author: Lester del Rey
- Language: English
- Genre: Science fiction novel Techno-thriller
- Publisher: Street & Smith Publications, Inc: Astounding Science Fiction
- Publication date: Sept 1942 (Expanded 1956, revised 1976)
- Publication place: United States
- Media type: Periodical (Later paperback)
- Pages: 74 (1942 version); 153 (1956); 192 (1976)

Nerves is a novella from science fiction's "Golden Age" written by American author Lester del Rey (1915–1993). It was first published in Astounding Science Fiction magazine by John W. Campbell, Jr, in September 1942, with illustrations by William Timmins.

The novella was well received and has been anthologized countless times. Del Rey expanded the work and updated the science in the story in 1956 when it was published as a stand-alone novel. He revised it again in 1976 as a final version.

The techno-thriller involves a near-future "atomic products" plant (changed to a nuclear power plant in the later versions) where, after an industrial accident, a plant physician and his team race against time to prevent a continent-wide catastrophe. It was published ten months after the United States' entry into World War II and three months after the Battle of Midway, but about three years before the first use of an atomic weapon at Hiroshima. Del Rey's expansion/revision of 1956 came out shortly after the world's first nuclear power plants became operational.

== Plot summary ==
At the National Atomic Products Co., Inc., somewhere in the American Midwest and some years after end of the "Great War" (World War II), Doctor "Doc" Roger Ferrel, the "physician in charge", leads a mixed team of occupational physicians, atomic physicists, nurses, medical attendants and others. Among his colleagues and subordinates are Doctor Matsuura "Hoke" Hokusai (a top Japanese atomic physicist who had been distraught "over the treachery of his people"), Doctor Robert "Bob" Jenkins (a very junior and unseasoned physician who also has a degree in "atomics" and has additional expertise that he keeps carefully hidden), Doctor Sue Brown Jenkins (Bob's wife, among the first of a new breed of "nursing doctor") and an expert atomist named Jorgenson (who knows more about the plant's processes than anyone else, but is unfortunately incapacitated early in the story). The plant's atomic products are not electric power or nuclear weapons but radioactive pesticides to combat boll weevils and other agricultural applications. Among these is a radioactive isotope known as Natomic I-713 (useful because of its very short half-life). It degrades into something called Isotope R which is less benign, and under some circumstances into Mahler's Isotope which is existentially threatening. An accident and explosion occurs at one of the plant's four "converters" ("reactors" in the 1956 revision) and Ferrel and his teammates work frantically at the plant infirmary in an ongoing mass casualty operation. Among the medical innovations utilized is the drug curare to abate the seizures attendant upon radiation sickness, use of hypothermia to facilitate major surgery, and an early speculative version of a heart-lung machine. Ferrel's team's contributions are ultimately crucial in averting nation-wide catastrophe.

== Reception ==
The significance of "Nerves" was recognized early on when it was anthologized in "the definitive collection of Golden Age science fiction" (according to Robert Silverberg)—namely, Adventures in Time and Space (1946), a book still in print.

"Nerves" was selected in 1973 by the Science Fiction Writers of America for inclusion in The Science Fiction Hall of Fame, Volume Two, which collected the most important works published prior to SFWA's founding in 1965.

== Revisions ==
Del Rey updated "Nerves" in 1956 with an expanded version published by Ballantine Books. In this version, the action transpires at a nuclear power plant in Kimberly, Missouri. Atomic weapons are not mentioned in the 1942 version of the story, except for a brief statement on Hokusai's enthusiasm for research into "an atomic explosive bomb which will let us wipe out the rest of the world". Del Rey again revised the work in 1976 and provided an afterword.
