= Peter A. Sturgeon =

American political activist

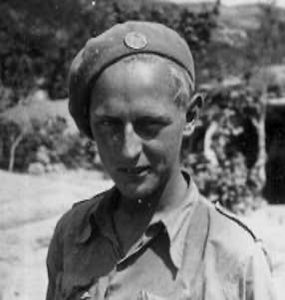
Sturgeon c. 1936

Peter Assheton Sturgeon (November 22, 1916 – July 22, 2005) was founder of the American branch of Mensa.

== Biography ==
Sturgeon was the son of Edward Molineaux Waldo, a Staten Island paint manufacturer, and Christine Hamilton Dicker, a British writer and political activist. He was the older brother of American science fiction writer Theodore Sturgeon. Their parents divorced when they were children and in 1927 their mother married William Dickie Sturgeon, an emigrant Scottish college professor. Christine and her children relocated to Philadelphia where Peter and his brother Theodore were educated in public schools.

After high school Peter joined the Communist Party. After working for a time as a party activist in a steel industry organizing campaign in Baltimore, he went to Spain and fought on the Republican side in the Spanish Civil War as a volunteer with the British Battalion of the International Brigades. The writer William Tenn has stated that Sturgeon became involved with POUM while in Spain and fell into disfavor with his superiors. After returning to the United States Sturgeon resigned from the Communist Party and associated with the Trotskyist Socialist Workers Party.

In 1941, he was drafted into the Army, serving as a combat paratrooper in the 517th Parachute Regimental Combat Team until his discharge in November 1945.

After the war he earned a Bachelor of Science degree at New York University.

He settled in Brooklyn with his wife Ines, working as a medical writer and writing technical material for the pharmaceutical industry. He founded the first American chapter of Mensa in New York in 1960, holding early meetings at his Brooklyn apartment.

In 1965 he left the United States, taking a job with the World Health Organization in Switzerland.

In 1968 he relocated to Vienna, Austria where he worked for the United Nations Industrial Development Organization. He died in Vienna in 2005.
