= The Science Fiction Hall of Fame, Volume Two =

Anthology edited by Ben Bova

Volume Two A

The Science Fiction Hall of Fame, Volume Two is an English-language, science-fiction, two-volume anthology edited by Ben Bova and published in the U.S. by Doubleday in 1973, distinguished as volumes "Two A" and "Two B". In the U.K., they were published by Gollancz as Volume Two (1973) and Volume Three (1974). The original U.S. subtitle was The Greatest Science Fiction Novellas of All Time.

Twenty-two novellas, (Note: Bova calls them "novelets and novellas" in the introduction. SFWA distinguishes those two categories by word count fewer and greater than 17,500 and defines "short stories" by fewer than 5,000 words. Volume One used a 15,000-word ceiling so it collected short stories and novelettes as the organization later defined terms.) published from 1895 to 1962, were selected by vote of the Science Fiction Writers of America (SFWA), as that body had selected the contents of The Science Fiction Hall of Fame Volume One, 1929–1964, a collection of the best-regarded short stories. SFWA had been established in 1965 and that publication year defined its first annual Nebula Awards. Introducing the collected novellas, Bova wrote, "The purpose of the Science Fiction Hall of Fame anthologies is to bestow a similar recognition on stories that were published prior to 1966 [sic], and thus never had a chance to earn a Nebula."

The selection process generated both a top 10 stories list and a top 10 authors list.

Although the original publication dates ranged from 1895 to 1962, only two stories were published before 1938, "The Time Machine" by Wells (1895) and "The Machine Stops" by Forster (1909).

Theodore Sturgeon reviewed the anthology favorably, praising the decision to issue it in two volumes rather than scale back the contents. Bova's introduction thanks Doubleday science-fiction editor Larry Ashmead for that.

== Contents ==
Bova's introduction (identical in both volumes) honored 24 works, identifying two that made the cut but were not included. "A Canticle for Leibowitz" by Walter M. Miller, Jr. (1955) was not available for republication in 1973 because it had been incorporated in the fix-up novel A Canticle for Leibowitz (1959), which was still in print. By His Bootstraps (1941) would have been a second work by Robert A. Heinlein. Those two ranked second and ninth in the voting.

The first half, Volume Two A, includes eight of the 10 leading stories by SFWA vote and the other two are not in the anthology, as described just above.

Contents, volumes 2A and 2B (US), vols. 2 and 3 (UK)
Author	Title	Date
Volume 2A
Poul Anderson	"Call Me Joe"	1957
John W. Campbell	"Who Goes There?"	1938
Lester del Rey	"Nerves"	1942
Robert A. Heinlein	"Universe"	1941
Cyril M. Kornbluth	"The Marching Morons"	1951
Henry Kuttner and C. L. Moore	"Vintage Season"	1946
Eric Frank Russell	"...And Then There Were None"	1951
Cordwainer Smith	"The Ballad of Lost C'Mell"	1962
Theodore Sturgeon	"Baby Is Three"	1952
H. G. Wells	"The Time Machine"	1895
Jack Williamson	"With Folded Hands"	1947
Volume 2B
Isaac Asimov	"The Martian Way"	1952
James Blish	"Earthman Come Home"	1953
Algis Budrys	"Rogue Moon"	1960
Theodore Cogswell	"The Spectre General"	1952
E. M. Forster	"The Machine Stops"	1909
Frederik Pohl	"The Midas Plague"	1954
James H. Schmitz	"The Witches of Karres"	1949
T. L. Sherred	"E for Effort"	1947
Wilmar H. Shiras	"In Hiding"	1948
Clifford D. Simak	"The Big Front Yard"	1958
Jack Vance	"The Moon Moth"	1961

== Top ten ==
In the selection process, SFWA members were asked to vote for 10 of the 76 stories on the ballot, selecting no more than one by any one author. In the introduction to the collection, Bova reported the top 10 stories and top 10 authors by number of votes. (As described above, "A Canticle for Leibowitz" and "By His Bootstraps" were not included in the collection.)

=== Stories ===
- "Who Goes There?" (1938), John W. Campbell, Jr.
- "A Canticle for Leibowitz" (1955), Walter M. Miller, Jr.
- "With Folded Hands" (1947), Jack Williamson
- "The Time Machine" (1895), H. G. Wells
- "Baby Is Three" (1952), Theodore Sturgeon
- "Vintage Season" (1946), Henry Kuttner and C. L. Moore
- "The Marching Morons" (1951), C. M. Kornbluth
- "Universe" (1941), Robert A. Heinlein
- "By His Bootstraps" (1941), Robert A. Heinlein
- "Nerves" (1942), Lester del Rey

=== Authors ===
- Robert A. Heinlein
- Theodore Sturgeon
- John W. Campbell, Jr.
- Walter M. Miller, Jr.
- Lester del Rey
- C. M. Kornbluth
- Jack Williamson
- H. G. Wells
- Poul Anderson
- Henry Kuttner and C. L. Moore

== Select publication history ==
First editions

- U.S., Volumes "Two A" and "Two B", Doubleday (ISBN 0-385-04576-X, xi+529; ISBN 0-385-05788-1, xi+527)
- U.K. Volumes "Two" and "Three", Gollancz (1973, xi+422pp; 1974, xi+440pp)

Later U.S. editions have been called Volumes IIA and IIB.

== Series ==
In the U.K., Gollancz continued the series in 1981 with Volume Four, edited by Arthur C. Clarke, comprising an introduction by Clarke and 16 short stories, novelettes, and novellas published 1965 to 1969 (ISBN 0-575-02989-7, 672pp).

In the U.S., Avon published identical contents in 1982 as Volume III, crediting Clarke and George W. Proctor as editors (ISBN 0-380-79335-0, 672pp, paperback) and followed with Volume IV in 1986, edited by Terry Carr, comprising 14 works published 1970 to 1974 (ISBN 0-380-89710-5, xiv+434pp, paperback).

== See also ==
- Nebula Award for Best Novella
- Nebula Award for Best Novelette
- The Science Fiction Hall of Fame, Volume One, 1929–1964
