= Science Fiction Hall of Fame =

The Science Fiction Hall of Fame can refer to:

- Science Fiction and Fantasy Hall of Fame, a part of the Museum of Pop Culture in Seattle
- The Science Fiction Hall of Fame, Volume One, 1929–1964, a popular anthology of short stories judged the best by the Science Fiction Writers of America (SFWA)
- The Science Fiction Hall of Fame, Volume Two, a 1973 collection of novellas selected by the SFWA
