= Killdozer (film) =

1974 television film by Jerry London

- Genre: Horror; Sci-Fi
- Based on: "Killdozer!" by Theodore Sturgeon
- Written by: Ed MacKillop; Theodore Sturgeon; adapted by Herbert F. Solow
- Directed by: Jerry London
- Starring: Clint Walker
- Music by: Gil Mellé
- Country of origin: United States
- Original language: English

Production
- Producer: Herbert F. Solow
- Production locations: Indian Dunes - 28700 Henry Mayo Drive, Valencia, California
- Cinematography: Terry K. Meade
- Editors: Bud Hoffman; Fabien Tordjmann
- Running time: 74 minutes
- Production company: Universal Television

Original release
- Network: ABC
- Release: February 2, 1974

Killdozer is a 1974 made for TV science-fiction horror movie, adapted from a 1944 novella of the same name by Theodore Sturgeon. A comic book adaptation appeared the same year, in Marvel Comics' Worlds Unknown #6 (April 1974). The film has since gained a cult following.

== Plot ==
A meteorite crashes onto the Earth's surface on an island off the coast of Africa. Years later, after natural forces have buried it and restored the local environment, six construction workers are boated to the island to begin work building an airstrip for an oil drilling company at the crash site on the uninhabited island. A recovering alcoholic, foreman Kelly, is in charge, but this is his last chance to redeem himself; if he fails this project, he will almost certainly be fired and face abysmal job prospects.

Kelly and bulldozer driver Mack uncover the meteorite, which emits a strange sound. When the bulldozer is used to try to shift the meteorite, it emits a blue light that moves to, and seems to possess, the bulldozer. Mack, standing nearby as this occurs, falls ill and then dies some hours later. Chub, the team's mechanic, cannot find anything wrong with the inoperative bulldozer, but can hear the odd sound from the blade. Kelly orders that the bulldozer not be used.

Beltran ignores the prohibition and starts the bulldozer, bringing it to malevolent life, indwelt by the entity. It destroys the camp's radio and begins a rampage, killing the workers one by one. It seems to run indefinitely despite a limited fuel capacity. The entity that indwells the machine has some rudimentary intelligence and guile: it hunts down the men.

The crew is soon reduced to just Kelly and Dennis. Running out of options, with the expected relief crew not due to arrive just yet, they amuse themselves by convicting the entity/bulldozer of murder, then consider methods of "execution": it is too heavy to hang, and too big for the gas chamber. They then realize electrocution may be possible. They lure it to a trap consisting of steel Marston Matting connected to a generator.

As the high voltage electricity conducts through the bulldozer, the alien entity emerges as an aura around the machine. Still, there is nothing close by for it to transfer to: the aura finally fades. The men shut down the power and checked the blade: no sound. Though Kelly realizes his story will not be believed, he intends to tell the truth.

== Cast ==
- Clint Walker as Lloyd Kelly
- Carl Betz as Dennis Holvig
- Neville Brand as 'Chub' Foster
- James Wainwright as Jules 'Dutch' Krasner
- James A. Watson Jr. as Al Beltran
- Robert Urich as 'Mack' McCarthy

== Production ==
Filming took place in early 1974 near Newhall, California. Stunts were done by Carey Loftin, who did stunts on Duel. The bulldozer featured was an early 66A production model Caterpillar D9G with modified front lights and a rear operator compartment that acted as a diesel tank.

== Release ==
=== Home media ===
Killdozer was released for the first time on DVD by Willette Acquisition Corporation on July 1, 2021, and on blu-ray and DVD by Kino Lorber in 2020.

== Reception ==
Killdozer received mostly negative reviews upon its release, with criticism directed towards the film's 'outlandish' premise.

The Los Angeles Times called it "technically lots more impressive than it is dramatic."

Charleston Picou from HorrorNews.net gave the film a mixed review, writing, "While the movie itself is well made for a ‘70s TV flick, with decent acting and directing, it's ultimately undone by the overall ridiculousness. The titular killdozer is never really that frightening and is sometimes kind of silly looking." Regardless, Picou stated the film 'still manages to be entertaining'. Jon Condit from Dread Central panned the film, awarding the film a score of 0.5 out of 5. In his review, Condit criticized the film's ridiculous premise, sluggish pace, "one-dimensional" characters, and overall lack of suspense. Andrew Smith from the British film review website Popcorn Pictures gave the film a score of 0 out of 10, writing, "Killdozer is dreadful fare which should have been left to rust on the seventies scrap heap. It's hard trying to find positives to say about it. Even its short running time drags out for an eternity." However, not all reviews for the film were negative. The Terror Trap rated the film a score of 2.5 out of 4 stars, stating that the film "comes off fairly well thanks to its straightforward, sci-fi approach", while also noting its strange premise.

== Legacy ==
In spite of receiving largely negative reviews from both critics and audience members, Killdozer has acquired a cult following over the years and is now considered a cult classic. A punk/noise rock band Killdozer from Madison, WI named itself after the movie.

== See also ==
- List of American films of 1974
- Marvin Heemeyer
