= Venus Plus X =

1960 novel by Theodore Sturgeon

- First edition cover
- Author: Theodore Sturgeon
- Cover artist: Victor Kalin
- Language: English
- Genre: Science fiction
- Publisher: Pyramid Books
- Publication date: September 1960
- Publication place: United States
- Media type: Print (paperback)
- Pages: 160
- OCLC: 5462038

Venus Plus X is a 1960 science fiction novel by American writer Theodore Sturgeon. First published by Pyramid Books in New York, it follows Charlie Johns, who is brought to Ledom, an isolated technologically advanced society whose inhabitants possess both male and female reproductive capacities and are not assigned fixed sex roles. The narrative alternates Johns's experiences with episodes involving a mid-century suburban American family.

Critics have interpreted the contrast between Ledom and the suburban episodes as an examination of sex roles, equality, and the relationship between biological difference and social order. They have also read Ledom as a utopian experiment that tests the possibilities and limits of social change. The novel was a finalist for the 1961 Hugo Award for Best Novel and drew sharply differing contemporary reviews; later critics have discussed it in relation to feminist science fiction and queer science fiction while noting its period-bound treatment of gender.

== Background and publication ==
Venus Plus X was first published by Pyramid Books in New York in September 1960. The published title was not Sturgeon’s original: according to The Encyclopedia of Science Fiction, he had called the novel Eden Again before Pyramid retitled it for publication.

In a postscript dated “New York / June 1960”, Sturgeon wrote that he had set out to make “a decent book” about sex. His account of its sources was qualified: he named Gordon Rattray Taylor’s Sex in History and Philip Wylie’s The Disappearance among works from which he had “dredged” material, while insisting that he had not carried any of them wholesale into the manuscript. He also explained that “Ledom” came from the name on a can of his favorite tobacco, Model, spelled backward.

The novel then appeared in serial form in New Worlds, which ran it from January through April 1961. Under editor John Carnell, it was among the American reprints published during the magazine’s move toward psychological and existential science fiction. In 1999, Vintage issued a 224-page paperback edition.

== Plot ==
Twenty-seven-year-old Charlie Johns awakens in a silver chamber with no memory of how he arrived there. Trying to hold on to his identity, he repeats his name and recalls his home, his work, his mother, and Laura, the woman he loves. His wristwatch runs backward, and the chamber seems to be part of a complex machine. When it opens, Charlie meets people whose appearance he cannot classify as male or female. After treatment gives him their language, they tell him that he has been brought to Ledom, a society in the future, after the civilization he knew destroyed itself.

The Ledom say that Charlie is to observe their society and give an outsider's judgment of it; once he can do so, they will return him to his own time. His principal guide is Philos, a historian. He also meets Seace, who heads the Science One; Mielwis, who heads the Medical One; and Grocid and Nasive, who oversee the Children's Ones.

Seace explains the A-field, a force-field technology used to make structures, tools, transport, and the barrier that encloses Ledom. The other central technology, the cerebrostyle, can record and transfer sequences of thought. It gives Charlie the Ledom language and enables people to acquire information directly. With food, energy, shelter, and education provided by those technologies, the Ledom divide their time among work, craft, agriculture, and family life.

Mielwis tells Charlie that every Ledom has male and female reproductive organs. Either partner in a pair can conceive and carry children, and both may do so at once. Mielwis attributes this condition to a natural mutation. The organs are normally hidden under a small garment and emerge only when required. Charlie remains unsettled by the explanation, but he continues his tour of Ledom.

At the Children's Ones, Grocid and Nasive show Charlie the community's deliberately low-technology practices. Children and adults build houses, make pottery, grow food, and learn to survive without the A-field. Children are raised collectively and occupy a central place in Ledom life. At a communal feast, Charlie sees a statue called the Maker, an adult looking up toward a huge child. Philos explains that Ledom venerates children as representatives of the future and of change. Through the cerebrostyle, Charlie later receives an extended account of Ledom's history and beliefs and comes to admire the society he has been shown.

These chapters alternate with scenes involving Herb and Jeanette Raile, their children Davy and Karen, and the neighboring Smith family. The Raile episodes include household arguments, shopping, parenting, religious gatherings, and disputes about changing expectations for men and women. They take place in Charlie's own period, although their connection to Ledom is not immediately apparent.

Philos eventually takes Charlie to Ledom's boundary and reveals what he has discovered. Years earlier, Philos and Froure were caught in a rockslide while both were pregnant. Philos lost two unborn children and found that they were ordinary human beings rather than Ledom. Froure survived and subsequently gave birth to twins, only one of whom lived. Philos hid Froure and the surviving child, Soutin, outside the settlement. He learned that Ledom children are born human and altered by the Medical One during their first month; the adults' regular examinations preserve the alterations. Mielwis also keeps an unaltered human, Quesbu, as the Control Natural.

Philos asks Charlie to take Soutin into the past. Charlie agrees, and the four enter Seace's laboratory. As Philos and Froure distract Seace, Charlie activates the apparatus said to be a time machine and enters it with Soutin. Opening its door brings him back to the place where he began. When Mielwis confronts him, Charlie condemns the Ledom and says that ordinary humanity would destroy them if it knew they existed.

Mielwis explains that there is no time machine. Seace arranged the backward-running watch, a familiar matchbook, and experimental records to encourage Charlie to form that explanation. The real Charlie Johns had been mortally injured when an aircraft struck Ledom's protective field. Mielwis recorded his mind with the cerebrostyle and implanted the record in Quesbu, whose own mind had been suppressed. When Mielwis speaks Quesbu's name, Quesbu reawakens with Charlie's memories.

The Ledom allow Quesbu and Soutin to live at the settlement's edge with Philos and Froure, hoping that their descendants can begin a different human community. Quesbu continues to remember Laura and the feelings associated with her; Philos tells him to direct that love toward Soutin because Charlie's love for Laura was fleeting. As Quesbu returns to Soutin, nuclear fallout begins to strike the A-field above Ledom, while the settlement remains beneath its protection.

== Themes and analysis ==
=== Gender roles, identity, and social order ===
By alternating Charlie’s experience of Ledom with scenes from the Raile family’s suburban life, the novel builds its treatment of sex roles into its form. Helen Merrick interprets Ledom’s equality as founded on the removal of biological difference, with the contrast exposing a culturally constructed masculinity that uses difference to disempower others. The Raile episodes, by contrast, are a satire of prescribed mid-century roles in Thomas D. Clareson’s account, while Pamela J. Annas sees the male viewpoint and the domestic interludes as devices for examining the effects of sexual role typing.

Justine Larbalestier focuses on the place of bodily difference in that contrast. She argues that the novel treats biological difference, or the perception of it, as an obstacle to equality, and presents its removal as a temporary answer. Her reading also emphasizes Charlie’s violent response when he learns how the Ledom have been made, suggesting how firmly the assumptions that Ledom seeks to escape remain embedded in him.

The Ledom society has also been read less as a prediction than as a thought experiment about the social effects of gender. Stephen H. Goldman describes its speculative setting as a metaphorical way of examining present human problems, contrasting life free from sex-role conditioning with the Raile family’s conditioned world. Brian Stableford likewise characterizes the novel as a social-engineering experiment, though he considers its conclusion ambiguous once Ledom is revealed to be artificial rather than natural.

Charlie’s perspective makes Ledom legible only through the male and female binary he already knows. Cox-Palmer-White reads the “X” of the title as marking that limitation: Charlie cannot imagine gender outside the binary, and his masculine pronouns for the Ledom reflect both his assumptions and a broader cultural treatment of maleness as universal. That linguistic framing persists even though the Ledom’s reproductive capacities challenge the category he assigns to them; Larbalestier therefore analyzes the society as masculinized despite those capacities. Annas sees the male observer and the alternating suburban episodes as narrative devices for examining sexual role typing, though she finds the novel’s treatment of the issue both unusually sympathetic and problematic.

The novel’s imagined equality rests on bodily intervention. Wendy Gay Pearson reads the Ledom’s surgical alteration of infants and their child-centered religious order as parts of a coordinated effort to counter inequalities produced by binary gender divisions. She contrasts the Ledom’s imposed, society-wide program with surgical transition by individuals seeking to address discomfort with their own bodies. Pearson cautiously describes the novel as the first to imagine a society-wide program of surgical sex transformation in response to a cultural and ideological system that divides people into binary genders. Brian Attebery identifies a different tension in that project. He calls the novel’s androgyny “subtractive,” reading the Ledom as men without conventional marks of maleness and locating its emotional charge in anxiety over the loss of sexual identity.

=== Utopia, artifice, and social change ===
The novel’s dual structure makes Ledom’s utopian promise inseparable from the social world it rejects. M. Keith Booker and Anne-Marie Thomas describe the Ledom chapters as a potentially utopian alternative to the Raile family’s suburban consumer culture and to repressive mid-century attitudes toward sex and gender. They also argue that the premise raises a more difficult question: whether utopia can be achieved only by altering human nature and suppressing difference. Benjamin S. Lawson likewise characterizes the novel as idea-dominant social and philosophical fiction, combining satire of constricting conventions with an imagined alternative society that he describes as hybrid and one-gendered rather than feminist.

Ledom’s apparent completeness is also qualified by its limits and its relation to change. David Ketterer reads it as an enclosed and artificial utopia whose genetic basis and controlled boundaries complicate its perfection; for him, the ending shifts the novel away from a finished utopia and toward a transition to one. Henry J. Lindborg similarly reads the novel as a rite of passage, interpreting androgyny as a symbol of wholeness and Ledom’s ideal of “passage” as a commitment to movement, change, and human development. The Encyclopedia of Science Fiction places the novel among examples of analytical utopian thought, describing a hermaphrodite utopia evaluated by a contemporary man who cannot overcome his prejudice, while the ending points only ambiguously toward an ideal society.

=== Later critical perspectives ===
Later criticism has situated Venus Plus X within both queer and feminist histories of science fiction, while preserving the tensions in its treatment of gender. Wendy Gay Pearson distinguishes her queer-genealogy reading from a battle-of-the-sexes framework, arguing that the novel examines the socially constraining effects of gender and sexuality through Ledom’s attempt to create a stable, egalitarian, genderless society by altering reproductive anatomy. In her account, the result is a queer and optimistic future rather than a simple resolution of gender conflict. David Pringle included Venus Plus X in his Science Fiction: The 100 Best Novels, calling it a notable prefiguration of 1970s feminist science fiction while qualifying that assessment by finding some of its contemporary scenes coy. The Encyclopedia of Science Fiction makes the narrower historical observation that the novel was among the relatively rare works by male science-fiction writers to imagine alternatives to patriarchal social organization.

== Reception ==
Venus Plus X was a finalist for the 1961 Hugo Award for Best Novel, which was won by Walter M. Miller Jr. for A Canticle for Leibowitz. Contemporary reviews nevertheless differed sharply in their response to it. In Worlds of If, Frederik Pohl called the book “wonderful,” praised its imagined world and its “remarkable, plausible, provocative” inhabitants, and ranked it among the best science-fiction novels he had encountered in recent years. Although he objected to the intercut dialogues and expressed reservations about the protagonist’s name and the postscript, he concluded that it was Sturgeon’s best novel. Alfred Bester, writing in The Magazine of Fantasy & Science Fiction, instead argued that the book was an extended exploration of Sturgeon’s attitudes toward sex and American mores rather than a novel. While calling Sturgeon a brilliant and perceptive writer, Bester criticized the work’s treatment of sex as overly serious and clinical.

A 1964 review by B. E. J. Garmeson in the LGBT advocacy periodical ONE offered another contemporary response. Describing Sturgeon as a notable writer on homosexuality, Garmeson called Venus Plus X both an adventure and an allegory, read it as an indirect exposure of sexual prejudice, and recommended it as a challenging, intensely thought-provoking success.

In 1995, Brian Aldiss judged More Than Human superior to Venus Plus X and characterized the latter as a novel of “outré sexuality” set in a hermaphrodite utopia. Jo Walton later called the novel clever and thought-provoking, describing it as both ahead of its time and inseparable from the era in which it was written. Graham Sleight, writing in 2010, regarded its debate about gender as dated for contemporary readers, arguing that the male viewpoint shapes its treatment of Ledom and makes the novel seem directed primarily at men.
