= Call Me Joe =

1957 novelette by Poul Anderson

- Short story by Poul Anderson
- First publication Cover art by Frank Kelly Freas
- Language: English
- Genre: Science fiction

Publication
- Publication date: April 1957
- Publication place: United States

"Call Me Joe" is a science fiction novelette by American writer Poul Anderson (1926–2001), first published in Astounding Science Fiction in April 1957. It has been frequently anthologized, including in The Science Fiction Hall of Fame, Volume Two (1973), a collection of unusually outstanding works selected by the Science Fiction Writers of America.

The story involves a future program by humans to explore and settle the surface of the planet Jupiter. (At the time of publication, it was considered plausible that the planet had a solid surface.) Because the Jovian environment is extreme (gravity, pressure, temperature, hydrogen/ammonia atmosphere, liquid methane)—and thus humans cannot descend to the surface—a prototype synthetic life-form is created and remote-controlled by technologically enhanced telepathy (psionics). This intelligent creature (which happens to resemble a centaur) is inserted among the native Jovian life-forms, none of which are sentient beyond a rudimentary level. The controller and operator of this artificial body is a severely disabled human.

== Plot summary ==
Joe is asleep in his den when a pack of native predators attack him. Using his great strength, and weapons made from sculpted ice, he kills the animals and, exultant, bays at the Moon above him. A vital component shorts out, and "Joe" reverts to being a human, Ed Anglesey, wearing a special headset on a space station orbiting Jupiter.

Anglesey furiously repairs the equipment and immediately returns to controlling Joe. It transpires that such equipment failures are happening more and more often. Attempts at repair have failed, and a psionics expert, Jan Cornelius, arrives at the station to evaluate the equipment, although he is aware that Anglesey himself may be the problem.

A wheelchair user, Anglesey is depicted as misanthropic, irritable, short-tempered, and utterly disliked by and avoided by his colleagues. He is allowed to stay on the station only because of his ability to establish a telepathic connection with and thereby control Joe, a creature designed to survive the hostile conditions on the Jovian surface. Cornelius suspects that something in Anglesey's mind rejects or fears Jupiter, and the resulting feedback keeps destroying the delicate equipment.

Eventually Cornelius is allowed to share a session with Anglesey during an important part of the mission, involving the seeding of Jupiter with a select group of female creatures similar to Joe in physiology, but with no higher intellect. As Joe, Anglesey is to conduct an experiment to determine if the planet can sustain artificial life by means of him mating with the creatures to form a new race. During this session, Cornelius becomes aware of a third mind – that of Joe himself.

It quickly becomes apparent that Anglesey's mind has been steadily transforming itself into Joe's and shrinking in the process. Cornelius was looking at the problem from the wrong end – it was not Anglesey's fear of going to Jupiter and becoming sublimated into Joe's stronger character which was causing the blowouts, but his fear of leaving Jupiter and the freedom Joe's whole and healthy, though non-human, body allows him. Anglesey's existence is poor and constricted compared to Joe's, and the environment has shaped a personality that no longer wants to be human.

Before the connection can be severed, Joe gains self-awareness and realizes that he is being watched. Forcing Cornelius out of his telepathic loop, the creature gathers up his pack and flees into the wilderness far from where the station can find them.

Cornelius revives on the station next to Anglesey's now brain-dead body. Far from being dismayed, he realizes that Anglesey was very happy to be subsumed into Joe. He speculates that in the future people with similarly damaged bodies, and even the very advanced in age, will be specifically chosen to merge with Jovian bodies and abandon their humanity, if only for the chance to live healthy and uncomplicated lives as simple animals.

== Adaptations ==
A comic book adaptation of Call Me Joe appeared in issue 4 of Starstream, 1976 (script by George Kashdan, art by Adolfo Buylla).

The premise of a paraplegic man whose mind remotely controls an alien body and who chooses to fully merge with it also appears in James Cameron's 2009 film Avatar, similar enough for some critics to have called for Anderson to receive credit.
