= The Cosmic Rape =

1958 novel by Theodore Sturgeon

- First ed. cover
- Author: Theodore Sturgeon
- Language: English
- Genre: Science fiction
- Published: 1958 (paperback)
- Publisher: Dell Publishing
- Publication place: United States
- Media type: Print
- Pages: 160 p.
- OCLC: 865028555

The Cosmic Rape is a science fiction novel by American writer Theodore Sturgeon, first published as an original paperback in August 1958. At the same time, a condensed version of the novel was published in Galaxy magazine as a short novel, probably condensed by the editor, under the title To Marry Medusa. It was reprinted in 1977 by Pocket Books.

== Plot ==
The book concerns an extraterrestrial hive mind named Medusa, which has assimilated many worlds and life forms and plans to absorb Earth as well. Dan Gurlick is an alcoholic who unknowingly ingests a spore from Medusa, which turns him into a host.

== Sources ==
- Paul Williams, ed. The Man Who Lost the Sea, Volume X: The Complete Stories of Theodore Sturgeon, p. 333. Berkeley, CA: North Atlantic Books, 2005. ISBN 1-55643-519-3
