= Killdozer! (novella) =

Short story by Theodore Sturgeon

"Killdozer!" first appeared in the Astounding Science Fiction issue of November 1944. Cover art by William Timmins.

"Killdozer!" is a science fiction/horror novella by American writer Theodore Sturgeon, originally published in the magazine Astounding (November 1944) and revised for the 1959 collection Aliens 4.

This story represents Sturgeon's sole output between the years 1941 and 1945. Everything else that was published during this time had been written before. Sturgeon suffered from long bouts of writer's block, but was somehow able to produce this story in 9 days. It is one of his most famous stories, and was his most financially successful during the first decade of his career.

The story inspired a 1974 TV-movie and a Marvel Comics adaptation by Gerry Conway and Richard Ayers in Worlds Unknown #6 (April 1974).

== Plot summary ==
The story opens with a short explanation of Earth's ancient history. The Earth was once populated by a great empire that was at war with an alien race of pure energy. The enemy attacked with weapons that took over metal machinery and turned it against its builders. Earth finally gains the upper hand with a new weapon, but it runs out of control and the planet is destroyed. Only a single example of the enemy weapons survives, falling into slumber in a shelter as no Earth machines remain to possess. After countless years, humanity arises.

An eight-man construction crew is building an airstrip and related facilities on a small Pacific island during the course of World War II. As part of their construction equipment, they have a Caterpillar D7 bulldozer. It has been nicknamed "Daisy Etta" by one of the workers, a mispronunciation of De-Siete, D7 in Spanish. To build the airstrip, they plan on filling a swamp with stone from an outcrop at the top of a nearby hill. Daisy Etta is sent to break up the stone, which the foreman realizes is unlike anything he has seen before.

As they dig, they break open the ancient shelter, releasing the enemy weapon, which possesses the bulldozer. It goes on a rampage, hunting down the crew and killing them. Ultimately, only three of the original crew remain and one of them goes insane. The two remaining men review what they have seen and realize that there was a brief lull in the action after the bulldozer was hit by an arc welder. They lure the dozer into water that is connected to the welder power supply, electrocuting the being.

While trying to write a report on what happened, the two sane workers are despairing of anyone believing them. Then, a Japanese air raid bombs the whole area below them, including the places that the bulldozer damaged and the graves of their fellow workers. One worker tears up the report he was writing and throws it in the air, thrilled that an explanation is now available: enemy action in wartime.

== Reception ==
In 2020, Killdozer! won the 1945 Retro-Hugo Award for Best Novella.

== Adaptations ==
In the TV-movie version, the alien energy is contained in a meteor found by the crew's excavation. In the Marvel Comics version, the alien being's origin more closely follows Sturgeon's original story.

== Real-life incident ==
In 2004, Marvin Heemeyer used a modified bulldozer to destroy several buildings in Colorado. Although no one died except Heemeyer, by suicide, several media reports referred to the vehicle as a "Killdozer".
