= Baby Is Three =

1952 science fiction novella by Theodore Sturgeon

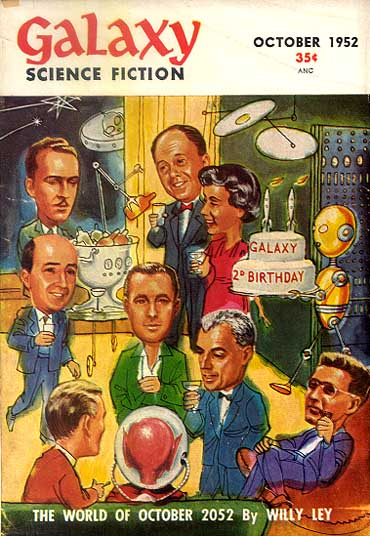
- Author: Theodore Sturgeon
- Language: English
- Genre: Science fiction
- Publication date: October 1952
- Publication place: United States

Baby Is Three is a science fiction novella by American writer Theodore Sturgeon, first published in the October 1952 issue of Galaxy magazine. It was later crafted into a full novel, More Than Human. The original novella was voted the fifth-best science fiction novella of the pre-1965 era by the Science Fiction Writers of America, and so was included in The Science Fiction Hall of Fame, Volume Two.

== Summary ==
The story describes the creation and "bleshing" of a new life form, Homo Gestalt, on Earth. It is formed by the symbiosis of four or more humans with paranormal abilities. One person, the "head" of the organism, assembles and directs the various parts through telepathy, another is the "hands" of the organism, able to move and change physical objects by telekinesis, the third and fourth persons are twins able to teleport at will, and the fifth person of the organism is a silent baby with Down syndrome with a brain like a computer and who acts as the "brain". "Bleshing" is how the organism describes its own completeness and functionality. The plot follows the psychiatric evaluation of a fifteen-year-old boy named Gerry, who believes he has murdered his caregiver Miss Kew for endangering the "bleshing" of his new organism.
