= E for Effort =

1947 science fiction novelette by T. L. Sherred

- Author: T. L. Sherred
- Language: English
- Genre: Science fiction
- Publisher: Astounding Science Fiction
- Publication date: May 1947
- Publication place: United States
- Media type: Print (Periodical, Anthologies)

"E for Effort" is a science fiction novelette by American writer T. L. Sherred, first published in 1947, about the consequences of a time viewer, a machine that projects images of the past. It has been reprinted many times, including in The Science Fiction Hall of Fame.

== Publication ==
The story was Sherred's first science fiction publication.

According to Algis Budrys, it was contrary to the spirit of Astounding Science Fiction, where it appeared, and it "dismissed" the "bourgeois aspirations" of ASF's editor, John W. Campbell. It is said that the story was accepted in Campbell's absence and that it was "shoehorned" into the magazine by L. Jerome Stanton, who for a short time acted "heretically" as Campbell's assistant.

== Synopsis ==
Taking place at some time in the near future (relative to when it was written), the story is briefly framed as a manuscript written by a civilian and delivered to the military under circumstances of great tension.

The manuscript is a long letter to "Joe", an otherwise unknown character, by Ed Lefko, one of the two lead characters. He describes seeing a silent but color movie aimed at Mexican-Americans in a run-down theater in Detroit. The movie depicts Cortés's conquest of Mexico with remarkably realistic sets and acting and a huge cast. The projectionist, a World War II veteran named Miguel "Mike" Laviada, tells Ed that he made the movie using a time viewer he invented, which he demonstrates. However, Mike has not been able to raise the capital needed to shoot the picture on high-quality film, add sound and other improvements, and get it distributed and advertised. He and Ed become partners, and at Ed's suggestion, they raise money by using the machine to blackmail wealthy people.

They spend a year making most of a new film out of time-viewed footage of Alexander the Great. They take it to Hollywood, where the high quality of the film easily convinces a producer and his associates to finish it, including using actors for scenes that appear in Alexander's biographies but did not really happen, and market it. The film is a great success with critics and viewers.

Mike and Ed produce a film on the Roman Empire, then one on the French Revolution. Both are successful, but the second arouses some controversy because of differences from widely believed myths. Through Mike's influence, Ed becomes less greedy and joins Mike in his plan to use the films against war. The next film, on the American Revolution, and the next, on the American Civil War, are banned in many places but still earn huge amounts of money.

The next film is about the First and Second World Wars. Ed and Mike admit the machine's existence to their associates and persuade them to join in their plan to expose the corruption of many famous people involved in the wars. The film causes riots in many countries and greatly increases international hostility.

Ed, Mike, and their associates are arrested for incitement to riot and other crimes. In their trial, they demonstrate the machine by showing the judge where he was on a certain day. They are acquitted, but the United States Army secretly takes them into "protective custody" and confiscates the machine. Mike and Ed's plan was to make war impossible by disseminating plans for the machine so every government and military could be watched. However, as the U.S. Army has the only machine, Ed expects other powers will attack preemptively before the United States can use its decisive advantage. He pleads with Joe to retrieve letters containing plans for the machine from their safe-deposit box—he has left Joe a key—and send them to their addressees around the world.

The story ends with military dispatches showing that Ed and Mike are dead, the bank and its contents have been destroyed by a direct hit with a nuclear weapon, and Washington, D. C. has been attacked with nuclear weapons. However the government's top officials fled before the attack began. The last dispatch refers to a "necessary and obvious cessation of hostilities".

== Characters ==
Edward Joseph Lefkowicz, known as Ed Lefko. A worldly-wise opportunist with a love for gadgets. Initially unscrupulous, he becomes more idealistic as a result of his contact with Mike.

Miguel Jose Zapata Laviada, known as Mike. The son of Mexican immigrants. An Army radar technician during World War II, he invented the time viewer and wants to use it to end war. He and Ed share a fondness for beer.

Ruth: An attractive, fun-loving young blonde, she becomes the secretary of Ed and Mike's company (with little to do for a long time), and their companion for drinking and dancing. They talk her into going to Los Angeles with them; there she becomes an actress in B movies.

Edward Lee Johnson, known as Lee Johnson: The Hollywood figure in charge of the production company that finishes Ed's and Mike's films. A shrewd businessman, resourceful problem solver, and decisive executive.

Robert Chester Marrs: Johnson's young assistant, who complains about doing the difficult tasks but accomplishes them. He is a skilled writer of film dialogue and advertising.

Benjamin Lyle "Bernie" Bernstein: In charge of sound for the films.

Carl Wilhelm Kessler: In charge of other technical aspects of the films.

Samuels (no first name given): A lawyer who represents the production company, including defending the men listed above at their criminal trial.

Mercedes Maria Gomez: A teacher of deaf children who reads lips in Spanish to provide dialogue for the film on the world wars, and testifies at the trial as part of the defense's case that the film is factual.

== Reception ==
Many people have called "E for Effort" classic, though some have limited the description to "a minor classic".

Fletcher Pratt cited it as an example of "a brilliantly original concept" with "no story at all... the science is dandy, but there is no fiction", so a reader would not reread it and would give it no more than a qualified recommendation.

Algis Budrys called it "a coherent, logical, entertaining, believable" story. He said it was the first to disturb "the National Guard armory that science fiction had become", as it involved a struggle "between Man and the Establishment", showed a man of Mexican ancestry as a brilliant and idealistic engineer rather than an exotic villain, and saw something better for engineers than a safe, lucrative career.

Jerry Pournelle said in 1985 that it was the only important story in modern science fiction, outside the work of Jack Williamson, that had "an easy, sophisticated view of international and corporate realpolitik" reminiscent of Eric Ambler and Graham Greene.

Brian Stableford called it "perhaps the most perfect ironic fantasy" on the theme that the privileged will not permit new technology to undermine their privilege.

James Gunn noted that Isaac Asimov's short story "The Dead Past" (1956) returns to the concept of "E for Effort".
