= Wilmar H. Shiras =

American novelist (1908–1990)

Wilmar House Shiras (September 23, 1908 – December 23, 1990), born Wilmar Alberta House in Boston, was an American science fiction author, who also wrote under the name Jane Howes. Her most famous story was "In Hiding" (1948), a novella included in the anthology, The Science Fiction Hall of Fame.

== Biography ==
Born in Boston, Massachusetts, Shiras attended Boston University, but dropped out in her freshman year to get married, at the age of 18. Her husband Russell became the research supervisor for chemical engineering for Shell Development Company. Shiras attended the University of California at Berkeley, studying history. She and her husband Russell raised five children, two boys and three girls, and it was for her family that Shiras began creating stories.

Her story "In Hiding" was submitted in 1948 to John W. Campbell, Jr.'s influential magazine Astounding Science Fiction, where it was published in the November issue. The story, about extraordinarily gifted children who were struggling to find their place in the world, struck a chord with readers and became a classic, rapidly appearing in multiple anthologies. Shiras published two sequels in the magazine: "Opening Doors," and "New Foundations." The three stories then became the first three chapters in the novel, Children of the Atom. It was published during her later-in-life sophomore year in college, attending the College of the Holy Names. Shiras also worked part-time as a translator for a New York publishing house. The book, about "the inevitable adjustments and maladjustments of minority genius to majority mediocrity", was hailed as another step in science fiction's coming of age, as it focused more in intellectual analysis and less on gadget-driven "space opera" She was credited for writing which showed a deep knowledge of people, and also demonstrated a foundation of Thomistic philosophy.

== Works ==
- 1948, "In Hiding", novelette, Astounding Science Fiction, November 1948
- 1949, "Opening Doors", novelette, Astounding Science Fiction, March 1949
- 1950, "New Foundations", novelette, Astounding Science Fiction, March 1950
- 1953, Children of the Atom novel, Gnome Press
- 1946 Slow Dawning (by Howes, Jane Pseud. Shiras, Wilmar House)

== Recognition ==
The story "In Hiding" was included in:

- The Best Science Fiction Stories 1949
- The Science Fiction Hall of Fame
- The Future Is Female! 25 Classic Science Fiction Stories by Women, from Pulp Pioneers to Ursula K. Le Guin edited by Lisa Yaszek

The Science Fiction Book Club named Children of the Atom at #14 on their list of "The Most Significant SF & Fantasy Books of the Last 50 Years, 1953-2002."

== Influence ==
Shiras's stories "In Hiding," "Opening Doors," and "New Foundations" became the first three chapters of Children of the Atom, and they have been credited, but never confirmed, as a source of inspiration for Stan Lee and Jack Kirby’s world-famous comic book creation, The Uncanny X-Men.
