= More Than Human =

1953 novel by Theodore Sturgeon

- First edition
- Author: Theodore Sturgeon
- Cover artist: Richard M. Powers
- Language: English
- Genre: Science fiction
- Publisher: Farrar, Straus & Young
- Publication date: November 16, 1953
- Publication place: United States
- Media type: Print (hardback & paperback)
- Pages: 233

More Than Human is a 1953 science fiction fix-up novel by American writer Theodore Sturgeon. It is a revision and expansion of his 1952 novella Baby Is Three, which is bracketed by two additional parts written for the novel, "The Fabulous Idiot" and "Morality". It won the 1954 International Fantasy Award, which was also given to works in science fiction. It was additionally nominated in 2004 for a "Retro Hugo" award for the year 1954. Science fiction critic and editor David Pringle included it in his book Science Fiction: The 100 Best Novels.

Simon & Schuster published a graphic novel version of More Than Human in 1979.

== Plot introduction ==
The novel concerns the coming together of six extraordinary people with strange powers who are able to "blesh" (a portmanteau of "blend" and "mesh") their abilities together. In this way, they are able to act as one organism. They progress toward a mature gestalt consciousness, called the Homo gestalt, the next step in human evolution.

== Plot summary ==
The first part of the novel, The Fabulous Idiot, narrates the birth of the gestalt through the perspective of a number of characters. The story starts with an unnamed man referred to as the "Idiot", who is 25 years old and homeless. He knows he can make people do what he wants them to, but can barely speak and has never experienced real human connection. One day he encounters Evelyn Kew, an innocent girl completely sheltered in an isolated house by her domineering, religious father. They connect telepathically and Lone attempts to enter her family's compound. Evelyn's father finds out about the relationship and kills Evelyn; the idiot then pushes him to kill himself. These events traumatize Evelyn's older sister Alicia, who is later introduced to more conventional society and struggles to fit in there.

During this incident, the idiot barely survives a beating from the father; bleeding and nearly dead, he is found and then adopted by the Prodds, a poor farming couple, and lives with them for about seven years. During this time he learns to speak and takes the name Lone, which Prodd takes to be his name when the Idiot attempts to say the word "alone." When Mrs. Prodd becomes pregnant, fulfilling the couple's desire to have a child, they are about to ask Lone to leave. However, Lone can perceive their intentions and he makes his departure appear to be his own idea. Lone builds a shelter in the forest and is soon joined by three runaway children: Janie, an eight-year-old with a telekinetic gift, and the twins Bonnie and Beanie, who cannot speak properly but possess the ability to teleport. Lone returns to the farm to find Mrs. Prodd has died after giving birth to a "Mongoloid" baby. Altering Prodd's memories so that he thinks his wife is on a trip and they never had a child, Lone adopts the baby, who has a phenomenal mental capacity and thinks almost like a computer. Together, Lone, Janie, the twins and Baby form what will be later called the Homo gestalt. Prodd continues trying to farm, but his old truck is always getting stuck in the mud. When Lone asks Baby for a solution, Baby helps Lone build an anti-gravity generator. He installs it in Prodd's truck, only to find that Prodd has left for Pennsylvania, believing his wife is there.

The second part of the novel is Baby Is Three, which occurs several years after The Fabulous Idiot. Gerry Thompson, a street urchin who has grown up in abusive institutions, is possibly sociopathic. He consults a psychiatrist, trying to piece his memory back together. Gerry ran away from an orphanage and was taken in by Lone. They lived in a refurbished cave until they found the abandoned Kew house. Lone was killed in an accident and Gerry subsequently became the leader of the gestalt. Prior to his death, Lone instructed the children to seek out Alicia Kew, now a spinster living alone with a maid. In her urban house, they were educated and fed under her care. Soon, however, Gerry came to feel that domestication and normalization had weakened their gestalt. He killed Alicia, and the group returned to living alone in the woods. His amnesia was caused by Alicia's having accidentally transmitted her memories to his mind when they first met, triggered by her strong emotional reaction to hearing the words "Baby is three". He learned about her entire life, including her past relationship with Lone, in a split second. After being helped by the psychiatrist, Gerry erases the man's memory of him. However, Gerry remains troubled by the psychiatrist's questions about morality.

The third and concluding part of the novel is Morality. Again, it occurs several years after the previous part. Janie, now an adult, befriends a man with amnesia and helps him regain his health. He slowly remembers what had happened. Seven years earlier, he was Lt. Hippocrates "Hip" Barrows, a gifted engineer who worked for the US Air Force until the incident which led to his incarceration, first in an insane asylum, then in jail. He had discovered some odd effects on an anti-aircraft range. Practice shells fired in a certain area were all duds. Barrows did magnetic tests and finally discovers the anti-gravity machine. It was still operational and attached to Prodd's truck, left abandoned in the field of the now-abandoned farm, which had been absorbed into the range. Gerry knows of Hip's investigation and poses as a common soldier assisting Hip. When they find the truck, Gerry turns the generator all the way up, sending the truck into the sky and preventing Hip from retrieving it. He then mentally attacks Hip to make him look insane, driving him to a mental breakdown and amnesia. Gerry does this because Baby informed him of the consequences (if the anti-grav was discovered, it would lead either to a terrible war or to the complete collapse of the world economy) and that such a major thing will surely be traced back to the gestalt. Aided by Janie, Hip regains his memory, and they go to the isolated Kew house, where the gestalt is now living again. Gerry attempts to attack Hip again. Instead, he finds Hip prepared for this moment, imagining in his mind a code of morality. This teaches Gerry shame, something he has never felt before, and he is humbled. Hip prepares to leave, but Janie convinces him to stay and become the gestalt's conscience. As a result of this completion, the gestalt is telepathically greeted by and welcomed into the pre-existing community of other gestalts around the world, causing Gerry to realize they weren't the only one after all. At the conclusion, Gerry:

He saw himself as an atom and his gestalt as a molecule. He saw these others as a cell among cells, and he saw in the whole the design of what, with joy, humanity would become.

He felt a rising, choking sense of worship, and recognized it for what it has always been for mankind―self-respect.

== Reception ==
New York Times reviewer Villiers Gerson placed the novel among its year's best, praising it for "a poetic, moving prose and a deeply examined raison d'etre." Groff Conklin described More Than Human as "a masterpiece of invention... written in an unmannered prose that still has a poetic, panchromatic individuality." Boucher and McComas praised it for "its crystal-clear prose, its intense human warmth and its depth of psychological probing" as well as its "adroit plotting and ceaseless surge of action," finding it "one of the most impressive proofs yet of the possibility of science fiction as a part of mainstream literature." P. Schuyler Miller praised the novel as among the year's best, saying that Sturgeon "has Bradbury's poetry and style without ever running thin." Writing in the Hartford Courant, reviewer R. W. Wallace praised More Than Human, saying "In its psychological wisdom and its deep humanity this novel is one of the finest achievements of science fiction." In his "Books" column for F&SF, Damon Knight selected Sturgeon's novel as one of the 10 best sf books of the 1950s.

Writing in 1975, R. D. Mullen declared that in More Than Human, "[Sturgeon] had a theme well suited to his talents and inclinations, [and] the result is a book that pretty well avoids the mawkishness that mars most of his work. This book is not a masterpiece, but it comes pretty close." Aldiss and Wingrove found that the novel "transcends its own terms and becomes Sturgeon's greatest statement of one of his obsessive themes, loneliness and how to cure it." In 2012, the novel was included in the Library of America two-volume boxed set American Science Fiction: Nine Classic Novels of the 1950s, edited by Gary K. Wolfe.

== Comics adaptation ==
In 1978, in collaboration with packager Byron Preiss Visual Publications, Heavy Metal magazine published a three-part comics adaptation of More Than Human. The script was adapted by writer Doug Moench and illustrated by Alex Niño. The story was initially serialized in Heavy Metal magazine vol. 2, issues #2 (June 1978), #3 (July 1978), and #4 (August 1978). A trade paperback collection of the adaptation was co-published in 1979 by HM Communications (the parent company of Heavy Metal Metal) and Simon & Schuster as Heavy Metal Presents Theodore Sturgeon's More Than Human; it featured an introduction by Sturgeon himself.
