= T. L. Sherred =

American novelist (1915–1985)

Thomas L. Sherred
- Born: August 27, 1915
- Died: April 16, 1985 (aged 69)

Thomas L. Sherred (August 27, 1915 – April 16, 1985) was an American science fiction writer.

Sherred was the author of a slim body of science fiction, consisting of a collection of stories, a novel, and the beginning of a novel that was completed by another author after Sherred's death in 1985. Sherred's stories were often set in Detroit and featured the down-to-earth laborers with whom the author was acquainted through his career in the automotive field, where he advanced from tool rooms to technical writing and public relations. He published few works of fiction, but his novella "E for Effort" (1947), about a time viewer, was voted into the Science Fiction Hall of Fame.

Algis Budrys wrote, "With one story, 'E for Effort', in the ASF [Astounding Science Fiction] of the wartime Forties, he handed the field such a knock that many old plinths are still loose in their sockets."

Sherred published his only novel, Alien Island, in 1970. A darkly humorous tale, Alien Island revolves around the devastating events that occur when aliens covertly inhabit Earth. Budrys found it disappointing, saying "It reads padded, uncoordinated, and unintentionally whimsical."

At his death in 1985, Sherred left an unfinished sequel to Alien Island, which author Lloyd Biggle, Jr. completed and published as Alien Main. Set on Earth some two hundred years after aliens had nearly destroyed life on the planet, the novel finds descendants of the aliens returning to atone for the atrocities committed by their ancestors. They find that the inhabitants of Earth are now living in tribes, with no connections except for a common belief in a goddess, whose return they await. While reviewer Gerald Jonas deemed Alien Main "not very ambitious," he nevertheless found the work offers a "pleasant blend of surprise and predictability," concluding: "Books such as this are the nourishing bread and butter of science fiction."

His writing career ceased in 1971 after he suffered a mild stroke.

== Bibliography ==
=== Collections ===
- First Person, Peculiar (Ballantine, New York, 1972)

=== Novels ===
- Alien Island (Ballantine, New York), 1970
- Alien Main (with Lloyd Biggle, Jr.) (Doubleday, Garden City, NY), 1985.

=== Short fiction ===
- "E for Effort", Astounding Stories (May 1947)
- "Cue for Quiet", Space Science Fiction (May July 1953)
- "Eye for Iniquity", Beyond Fantasy Fiction (July 1953)
- "Cure, Guaranteed", Future Science Fiction (August 1954)
- "See for Yourself" Escapade (June 1961)
- "Bounty", published in Again, Dangerous Visions, edited by Harlan Ellison, 1972
- "Not Bach", Outworlds #10 (January 1972)
