= Theodore Sturgeon =

American speculative fiction writer (1918–1985)

- Born: Edward Hamilton Waldo; February 26, 1918; New York City, U.S.
- Died: May 8, 1985 (aged 67); Eugene, Oregon, U.S.
- Relatives: Peter A. Sturgeon (brother)
- Writing career
- Pen name: E. Waldo Hunter
- Writing career
- Occupations: Fiction writer; critic
- Period: 1938–1985
- Genres: Science fiction; fantasy; horror; mystery; western; literary criticism
- Subject: Science fiction (as critic)
- Notable work: More Than Human; "Microcosmic God"; I, Libertine; "Slow Sculpture"
- Notable awards: Hugo; Nebula

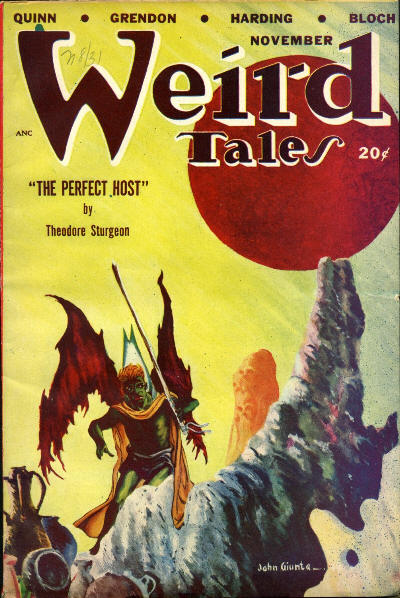
Sturgeon's "The Perfect Host" was the cover story in the November 1948 Weird Tales

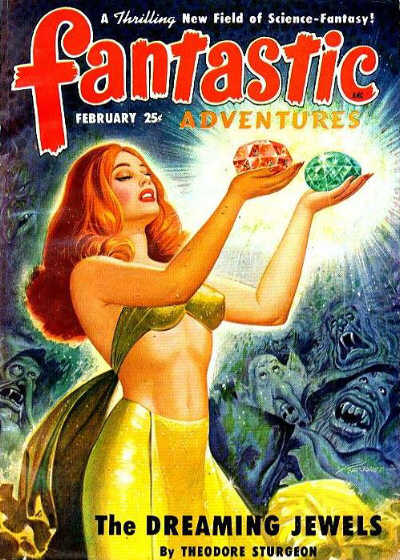
An early version of Sturgeon's first novel, The Dreaming Jewels, was the cover story in the February 1950 issue of Fantastic Adventures

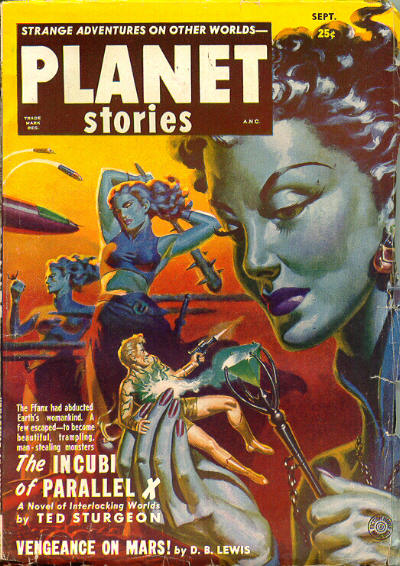
Sturgeon's novella The Incubi of Parallel X was the cover story in the September 1951 Planet Stories

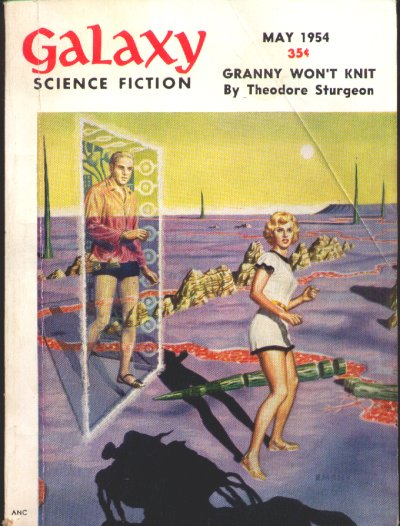
Sturgeon's novella Granny Won't Knit took the cover of the May 1954 Galaxy Science Fiction, illustrated by Ed Emshwiller

Theodore Sturgeon (/ˈstɜːrdʒən/; born Edward Hamilton Waldo, February 26, 1918 – May 8, 1985) was an American author of primarily fantasy, science fiction, and horror, as well as a critic. He wrote approximately 400 reviews and more than 120 short stories, 11 novels, and two scripts for Star Trek: The Original Series.

Sturgeon's science fiction novel More Than Human (1953) won the 1954 International Fantasy Award (for SF and fantasy) as the year's best novel, and the Science Fiction Writers of America ranked "Baby Is Three" number five among the "Greatest Science Fiction Novellas of All Time" to 1964. Ranked by votes for all of their pre-1965 novellas, Sturgeon was second among authors, behind Robert Heinlein.

The Science Fiction and Fantasy Hall of Fame inducted Sturgeon in 2000, its fifth class of two dead and two living writers.

== Biography ==
=== Youth and education ===
Sturgeon was born Edward Hamilton Waldo in Staten Island, New York, in 1918. His name was legally changed to Theodore Sturgeon at age eleven after his mother's divorce and subsequent marriage to William Dicky ("Argyll") Sturgeon. Theodore's birth father, Edward Waldo, was a color and dye manufacturer of middling success. With his second wife, Anne, he had one daughter, Joan. Theodore's mother, Christine Hamilton Dicker (Waldo) Sturgeon, was a well-educated writer, watercolorist, and poet who published journalism, poetry, and fiction under the name Felix Sturgeon. His stepfather, William Dickie Sturgeon (sometimes known as Argyll), was a mathematics teacher at a prep school and then Romance Languages Professor at Drexel Institute (later Drexel Institute of Technology) in Philadelphia. Sturgeon's account of his stepfather is included in a posthumous memoir. Sturgeon's sibling, Peter Sturgeon, wrote technical material for the pharmaceutical industry and the WHO, and founded the American branch of Mensa.

Upon graduating from high school in 1935, Sturgeon pleaded to be allowed to attend college, but his step-father refused to support him, citing his frivolity.

=== Great Depression and the war years ===
The young Sturgeon held a wide variety of jobs. As an adolescent, he wanted to be a circus acrobat; an episode of rheumatic fever prevented him from pursuing this. From 1935 (aged 17) to 1938, he was a sailor in the merchant marine, and elements of that experience found their way into several stories. He sold refrigerators door to door. He managed a hotel in Jamaica around 1940–1941, worked in several construction and infrastructure jobs (driving a bulldozer in Puerto Rico, operating a filling station and truck lubrication center, work at a drydock) for the US Army in the early war years, and by 1944 was an advertising copywriter. In addition to freelance fiction and television writing, in New York City he opened his own literary agency (which was eventually transferred to Scott Meredith), worked for Fortune magazine and other Time Inc. properties on circulation, and edited various publications.

Sturgeon initially had a somewhat irregular output, frequently suffering from writer's block. He sold his first story, "Heavy Insurance", in 1938 to the McClure Syndicate, which bought much of his early work. It appeared in the Milwaukee Journal on July 16. At first, he wrote mainly short stories, primarily for genre magazines such as Astounding and Unknown, but also for general-interest publications such as Argosy Magazine. He used the pen name "E. Waldo Hunter" when two of his stories ran in the same issue of Astounding. A few of his early stories were signed "Theodore H. Sturgeon".

=== 1950s: The boom years ===
Although the bulk of Sturgeon's short story work dated from the 1940s and '50s, his original novels were all published between 1950 and 1961. Disliking arguments with John W. Campbell over editorial decisions, Sturgeon only published one story in Astounding after 1950. He did, however, take very seriously Campbell's enthusiasms for psionics and for L. Ron Hubbard's Dianetics (even before it became the Church of Scientology in 1953). Sturgeon was "audited" by Campbell himself, and according to Alec Nevala-Lee, he became more devoted to it than any other science fiction writer other than A.E. van Vogt. He became a trained auditor and defended the Church for decades.

Sturgeon published the "first stories in science fiction which dealt with homosexuality, 'The World Well Lost' [June 1953] and 'Affair with a Green Monkey' [May 1957]", and sometimes put gay subtext in his work, such as the back-rub scene in "Shore Leave", or in his Western story, "Scars".

Sturgeon's short story "Talent" was published in the September 1953 issue of Beyond Fantasy Fiction. The story features the same omnipotent child monster concept found in Jerome Bixby's "It's a Good Life" (1953), which was adapted into an indelible episode of The Twilight Zone.

Carl Sagan later described "To Here and the Easel" (1954) as "a stunning portrait of personality disassociation as perceived from the inside", and further said that many of Sturgeon's works were among the "rare few science‐fiction novels [that] combine a standard science‐fiction theme with a deep human sensitivity". According to science fiction writer Samuel R. Delany, a friend of Sturgeon's, Sturgeon was bisexual.

Though not as well known to the general public as contemporaries like Isaac Asimov or Ray Bradbury, Sturgeon became well known among readers of mid-20th-century science fiction anthologies. At the height of his popularity in the 1950s he was the most anthologized English-language author alive.

Three Sturgeon stories were adapted for the 1950s NBC radio anthology X Minus One: "A Saucer of Loneliness" (broadcast twice), "The Stars Are the Styx" and "Mr. Costello, Hero".

Sturgeon was a member of the all-male literary banqueting club the Trap Door Spiders, which served as the basis of Isaac Asimov's fictional group of mystery solvers the Black Widowers. In 1959, Sturgeon moved to Truro, Massachusetts, where he met and became friendly with a then unknown Kurt Vonnegut, Jr. (Sturgeon was the inspiration for the recurrent character of Kilgore Trout in Vonnegut's novels.)

In 1959, he began to write book reviews (primarily of science fiction at the somewhat improbable behest of Frank Meyer, with whom he cultivated a largely apolitical friendship centered around their shared love of the genre despite Sturgeon's trenchant countercultural elan) for National Review, continuing in this capacity until 1973.

=== 1960s and '70s: Ellery Queen and TV scripts ===
Sturgeon ghost-wrote one Ellery Queen mystery novel, The Player on the Other Side (Random House, 1963). This novel was praised by critic H. R. F. Keating: "[I] had almost finished writing Crime and Mystery: The 100 Best Books, in which I had included The Player on the Other Side ... placing the book squarely in the Queen canon" when he learned that it had been written by Sturgeon. Similarly, William DeAndrea, author and winner of Mystery Writers of America awards, selecting his ten favorite mystery novels for the magazine Armchair Detective, picked The Player on the Other Side as one of them. He said: "This book changed my life ... and made a raving mystery fan (and therefore ultimately a mystery writer) out of me. ... The book must be 'one of the most skillful pastiches in the history of literature. An amazing piece of work, whomever did it'."

Sturgeon wrote the screenplays for the Star Trek: The Original Series episodes "Shore Leave" (1966) and "Amok Time" (1967, adapted as a Bantam Books "Star Trek Fotonovel" in 1978). The latter featured the first appearance of pon farr, the Vulcan mating ritual, the phrase "Live long and prosper" and the Vulcan hand salute. Sturgeon also wrote several more Star Trek scripts that were never produced. One of these first introduced the Prime Directive.

Sturgeon also wrote an episode of the Saturday morning show Land of the Lost, "The Pylon Express", in 1975. His 1944 novella Killdozer! was the inspiration for the 1974 made-for-TV movie, Marvel comic book, and alternative rock band of the same name, as well as becoming the colloquial name for Marvin Heemeyer's 2004 bulldozer rage incident.

=== Later years ===
Though Sturgeon continued to write through 1983, his work rate dipped noticeably in the later years of his life; a 1971 story collection entitled Sturgeon Is Alive and Well... addressed Sturgeon's seeming withdrawal from the public eye in a tongue-in-cheek manner. Two of his stories were adapted for the 1980s revival of The Twilight Zone. One, "A Saucer of Loneliness", was broadcast in 1986 and was dedicated to his memory. Another short story, "Yesterday Was Monday", was the inspiration for The Twilight Zone episode "A Matter of Minutes".

Sturgeon played guitar and wrote music, which he sometimes performed at science fiction conventions. He lived for several years in Springfield, Oregon. He died on May 8, 1985, of lung fibrosis, at Sacred Heart General Hospital in the neighboring city of Eugene. He had been a lifelong pipe smoker and his death from lung fibrosis may have been caused by exposure to asbestos during his Merchant Marine years.

John Clute wrote in The Encyclopedia of Science Fiction: "His influence upon writers like Harlan Ellison and Samuel R. Delany was seminal, and in his life and work he was a powerful and generally liberating influence in post-WWII US sf". He won comparatively few genre awards; one was the World Fantasy Award for Life Achievement from the 1985 World Fantasy Convention.

== Sturgeon's Law ==
In 1957, Sturgeon coined what is now known as Sturgeon's Law:

Ninety percent of [science fiction] is crud, but then, ninety percent of everything is crud.

This was originally known as Sturgeon's Revelation; Sturgeon has said that "Sturgeon's Law" was originally

Nothing is always absolutely so.

However, the former statement is now widely referred to as Sturgeon's Law.

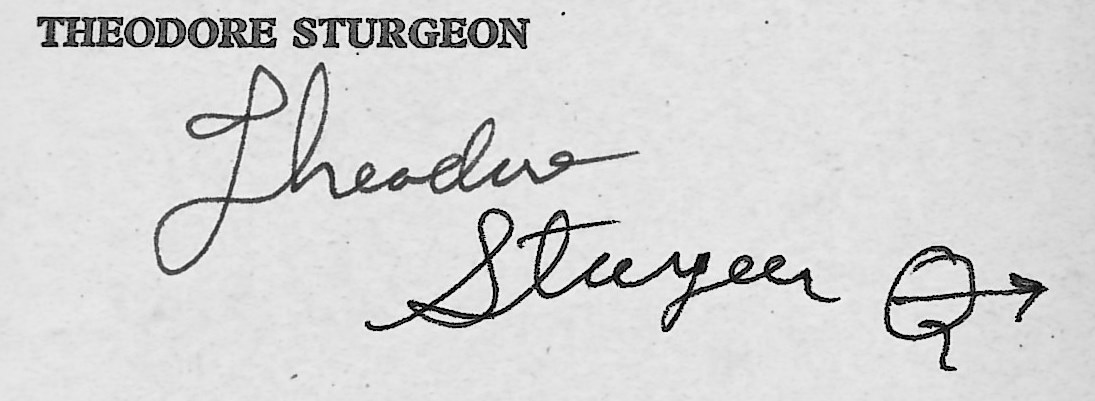
Theodore Sturgeon autograph with the Q symbol ("ask the next question")

He is also known for his dedication to a credo of critical thinking that challenged all normative assumptions: "Ask the next question." This was the subject of an essay published in Cavalier Magazine in June 1967. He represented this credo by the symbol of a Q with an arrow through it, an example of which he wore around his neck and used as part of his signature in the last 15 years of his life.

== Personal life ==
Wives and partners

Sturgeon was married three times, had two long-term committed relationships outside of marriage, divorced once, and fathered a total of seven children. His first wife was Dorothe Fillingame (married 1940, divorced 1945), with whom he had two daughters. He was married to singer Mary Mair from 1949 until an annulment in 1951. In 1953, he wed Marion McGahan, with whom he had two sons and two daughters. In 1969, he began living with Wina Golden, a journalist, with whom he had a son.

Finally, his last long-term committed relationship was with writer and educator Jayne Englehart Tannehill, with whom he remained until the time of his death. She joined Sturgeon at book signings for his collection Maturity, and signed as "Jayne Sturgeon". Englehart had her own biological son prior to her partnership with Sturgeon, to whom Sturgeon became like a stepfather.

Relationship with Kurt Vonnegut

In 1965, Kurt Vonnegut devised the name of his fictional science-fiction writer Kilgore Trout as an obscure reference to Sturgeon's name. The two writers had become friends when Sturgeon moved to Truro, Massachusetts, in 1957. Vonnegut described Trout as a notably unsuccessful writer, prolifically publishing hackwork only in pulp and pornographic magazines. Since the characterization was unflattering, it was not until after Sturgeon's death that Vonnegut explicitly acknowledged the connection; he stated in a 1987 interview that "Yeah, it said so in his obituary in The New York Times. I was delighted that it said in the middle of it that he was the inspiration for the Kurt Vonnegut character of Kilgore Trout." In 2000, Vonnegut wrote an admiring introduction to Volume VII of The Complete Stories of Theodore Sturgeon.

== Works ==
=== Novels ===
- The Dreaming Jewels (1950) Also published as The Synthetic Man
- More Than Human (1953) Fix-up of three linked novellas, the first and third written around Baby Is Three (Galaxy Science Fiction, October 1952)
- The Cosmic Rape (1958) A shorter version was published as To Marry Medusa
- Venus Plus X (1960)
- Some of Your Blood (1961)
- Godbody (1986) Published posthumously

==== Novelizations ====
Sturgeon, under his own name, was hired to write novelizations of the following movies based on their scripts (links go to articles about the movies):

- The King and Four Queens (1956)
- Voyage to the Bottom of the Sea (1961) The book is described in Voyage to the Bottom of the Sea (novel).
- The Rare Breed (1966)

==== Pseudonymous novels ====
- I, Libertine (1956): Historical novel created as a for-hire hoax. Credited to "Frederick R. Ewing", written from a premise by Jean Shepherd.
- The Player on The Other Side (1963): Mystery novel credited to Ellery Queen and ghost-written with Queen's assistance and supervision.

=== Short stories ===
Sturgeon published numerous short story collections during his lifetime, many drawing on his most prolific writing years of the 1940s and 1950s.

Note that some reprints of these titles (especially paperback editions) may cut one or two stories from the line-up. Statistics herein refer to the original editions only.

==== Collections published during Sturgeon's lifetime ====
The following table includes sixteen volumes (one of them collecting western stories). These are considered "original" collections of Sturgeon material, in that they compiled previously uncollected stories. However, some volumes did contain a few reprinted stories: this list includes books that collected only previously uncollected material, as well as those volumes that collected mostly new material, but also contained up to three stories (representing no more than half the book) that were previously published in a Sturgeon collection.

Title	Year	Number of stories	previously collected	Originally published	
Title	Year	Number of stories	previously collected	Earliest story	Latest story
Without Sorcery	1948	13		1939	1947
E Pluribus Unicorn	1953	13		1947	1953
A Way Home	1955	11		1946	1955
Caviar	1955	7	1	1941	1955
A Touch of Strange	1958	11		1953	1958
Aliens 4	1959	4		1944	1958
Beyond	1960	6		1941	1960
Sturgeon In Orbit	1964	5		1951	1955
Starshine	1966	6	3	1940	1961
Sturgeon Is Alive and Well ...	1971	11		1954	1971
The Worlds of Theodore Sturgeon	1972	10	3	1941	1962
Sturgeon's West (westerns)	1973	7		1949	1973
Case and the Dreamer	1974	3		1962	1973
Visions and Venturers	1978	8	1	1942	1965
The Stars Are The Styx	1979	10	1	1951	1971
The Golden Helix	1979	10	3	1941	1973

The following six collections consisted entirely of reprints of previously collected material:

Title	Year	Stories			Notes
Title	Year	Number	Earliest	Latest	Notes
Thunder and Roses	1957	8	1946	1955	selected from 11 in 1955's "A Way Home"
Not Without Sorcery	1961	8	1939	1941	selected from 13 in 1948's Without Sorcery
The Joyous Invasions	1965	3	1955	1958	selected from 4 in 1959's "Aliens 4"
To Here and the Easel	1973	6	1941	1958	
Maturity	1979	3	1947	1958	
Alien Cargo	1984	14	1940	1956	

==== Complete short stories ====
North Atlantic Books released the chronologically assembled The Complete Short Stories of Theodore Sturgeon, edited by Paul Williams. The series consisted of 13 volumes published between 1994 and 2010. Introductions were provided by Harlan Ellison, Samuel R. Delany, Kurt Vonnegut, Gene Wolfe, Connie Willis, Jonathan Lethem, and others. Extensive story notes were provided by Paul Williams and, in the last two volumes, Sturgeon's daughter Noël.

- Volume I – The Ultimate Egoist (1937 to 1940)
- Volume II – Microcosmic God (1940 to 1941)
- Volume III – Killdozer (1941 to 1946)
- Volume IV – Thunder and Roses (1946 to 1948)
- Volume V – The Perfect Host (1948 to 1950)
- Volume VI – Baby is Three (1950 to 1952)
- Volume VII – A Saucer of Loneliness (1953)
- Volume VIII – Bright Segment (1953 to 1955, as well as two "lost" stories from 1946)
- Volume IX – And Now the News... (1955 to 1957)
- Volume X – The Man Who Lost the Sea (1957 to 1960)
- Volume XI – The Nail and the Oracle (1961 to 1969)
- Volume XII – Slow Sculpture (1970 to 1972, plus one 1954 novella and one unpublished story)
- Volume XIII – Case and The Dreamer (1972 to 1983, plus one 1960 story and three unpublished stories)

=== Representative short stories ===
Sturgeon was best known for his short stories and novellas. The best-known include:

- "Ether Breather" (September 1939, his first published science-fiction story)
- "Derm Fool" (March 1940)
- "It" (August 1940)
- "Shottle Bop" (February 1941)
- "Microcosmic God" (April 1941)
- "Yesterday Was Monday" (1941)
- "Killdozer!" (November, 1944)
- "Maturity" (February, 1947)
- "Bianca's Hands" (May, 1947)
- "Thunder and Roses" (November 1947)
- "The Perfect Host" (November 1948)
- "It Wasn't Syzygy" (January 1948)
- "Minority Report" (June 1949, no connection to the 2002 movie, which was based on a later story by Philip K. Dick)
- "One Foot and the Grave" (September 1949)
- "Baby Is Three" (October 1952)
- "A Saucer of Loneliness" (February 1953)
- "The World Well Lost" (June 1953)
- "Mr. Costello, Hero" (December 1953)
- "The [Widget], The [Wadget], and Boff" (1955)
- "The Skills of Xanadu" (July 1956)
- "The Other Man" (September 1956)
- "And Now The News" (December 1956)
- "The Girl Had Guts" (January 1957)
- "The Man Who Lost the Sea" (October 1959)
- "Need" (1960)
- "How to Forget Baseball" (Sports Illustrated, December 1964)
- "The Nail and the Oracle" (Playboy, October 1964)
- "If All Men Were Brothers, Would You Let One Marry Your Sister?" (1967, Dangerous Visions anthology edited by Harlan Ellison)—Nebula Award 1967 Nominee Novella
- "The Man Who Learned Loving"—Nebula Award 1969 Nominee Short Story
- "Slow Sculpture" (Galaxy, February 1970) — winner of a Hugo Award and a Nebula Award
- "Occam's Scalpel" (August, 1971, with an introduction by Terry Carr)
- "Vengeance Is." (1980, Dark Forces anthology edited by Kirby McCauley)

=== Autobiography ===
- Argyll: A Memoir (pamphlet, Sturgeon Project, 1993), an autobiographical sketch about Sturgeon's relationship with his stepfather. Introduction by his editor Paul Williams. Afterword by Samuel R. Delany. Cover art by Donna Nassar. The memoir, written for his psychotherapist, has many suggestions about his life, starting from his family's move from Staten Island to Philadelphia when his stepfather got a job at Drexel University and Sturgeon and his brother were still in the local public school to their attempts to catch poison ivy to delay the move—"Then we moved to Philadelphia, a little apartment on 34 Street with a sort of sun room, which was Argyll's study and had a single couch which was his and Mother's bed, and a kind of living room with a kitchenette built into one wall, where we slept on the floor on mattresses."— and his father's treatment of a puppy he couldn't discipline—"... he used to whip her with a wire after rubbing her nose in it—so he got rid of her" (p. 14). These go on to include Sturgeon's first gay experiences in his 14th year—"So [20-year-old] Bert blew me practically continuously from Friday evening until dinner time Sunday; we kept score and I came 14 times. Sweet are the uses of respectability. My God! It never occurred to me until this minute that Dr. Taft was probably the one—the only one, as sole mentor, who could possibly have insured Argyll's total ignorance!" (p. 52); and in his long letter to his mother and Argyll, included in the same volume, Sturgeon harshly critiques his first novel, The Dreaming Jewels: "My use of one detested Argyll would have been fine, but one wasn't enough; there had to be two, and as a result the balance of the work was destroyed and its literary worth was lost in vengeful polemic" (p. 62).

== See also ==
- Theodore Sturgeon Award
- Golden Age of Science Fiction
