= DNA Publications =

American publishing company

- Founded: 1993
- Defunct: 2007
- Headquarters: United States

DNA Publications was an American publishing company that existed from 1993 to 2007 and was run by the husband-and-wife team of Warren Lapine and Angela Kessler. Initially based in Massachusetts, DNA Publications relocated to Radford, Virginia. As of 2004, it was the second-largest genre magazine publisher in the United States. Its first publication, in 1993, was the magazine Harsh Mistress, which Lapine produced in collaboration with Kevin Rogers and Tim Ballon.

DNA Publication distributed or published Aboriginal SF, Absolute Magnitude, Artemis, Dreams of Decadence, Fantastic Stories, Mythic Delirium, The Official KISS Magazine, Science Fiction Chronicle, and The Whole Cat Journal. It also published the book imprints Spyre Books and Wilder Publications.

For their work on the magazines, DNA Publications was a 2000 World Fantasy Award nominee, in the "special award: professional" category. Absolute Magnitude was a 2002 Hugo Award nominee in the semiprozine category. Notable authors published by the DNA Publications magazines include Chris Bunch, Hal Clement, Harlan Ellison, Alan Dean Foster, and Allen Steele. DNA Publications collapsed in early 2007. Weird Tales had been bought in 2005 by Wildside Press and Mythic Delirium, which parted with DNA Publications around the same time. Wilder Publications is now part of Tir Na Nog Press.
