= Cat and Mouse =

Cat and Mouse may refer to:

- Cat and mouse, an English-language idiom

== Film ==
- Cat & Mouse (1958 film), a British crime drama film
- Cat and Mouse (1967 film), a West German war drama film
- Cat and Mouse (1974 film), or Mousey, a Canadian thriller film
- Cat and Mouse (1975 film), or Le Chat et la souris, a French film by Claude Lelouch
- Cat and Mouse (2003 film), a Hong Kong wuxia film

== Games ==
- Cat and Mouse (card game), or Spite and Malice, a competitive patience game
- Cat and mouse (playground game)

== Literature ==
- Cat & Mouse (novel), a 1997 novel by James Patterson
- Cat and Mouse (novella), a 1961 novella by Günter Grass
- "Cat and Mouse" (Ralph Williams story), a 1959 novelette by Ralph Williams

== Music ==
- The Cat and the Mouse, a 1921 piano composition by Aaron Copland
- Cat and Mouse (album), by By2, 2015
- "Cat and Mouse", a song by the Red Jumpsuit Apparatus from Don't You Fake It, 2006

== Television episodes ==
- "Cat and Mouse" (Grimm), 2012
- "Cat and Mouse" (Star Wars: The Clone Wars), 2010
- "Cat and Mouse" (The Twilight Zone), 1989
- "Cat and Mouse", a c. 1952 episode of The Adventures of Ellery Queen
- "Cats and Mouse", a 2025 episode of Dexter: Resurrection

== Other uses ==
- Cat and Mouse (Sheep), a 1995 play by Gregory Motton
- Cat and Mouse Act, or the Prisoners (Temporary Discharge for Ill Health) Act, a 1913 British law

== See also ==
- Courageous Cat and Minute Mouse, a 1960–1962 American cartoon series
- Tom and Jerry, an American cartoon series and media franchise
