= Hugo Award for Best Short Story =

Annual awards for science fiction or fantasy

- Awarded for: The best science fiction or fantasy story of less than 7,500 words published in the prior calendar year
- Presented by: World Science Fiction Society
- First award: 1955
- Most recent winner: Thomas Ha ("In My Country")
- Website: thehugoawards.org

The Hugo Award for Best Short Story is one of the Hugo Awards given each year for science fiction or fantasy stories published or translated into English during the previous calendar year. The short story award is available for works of fiction of fewer than 7,500 words; awards are also given out for pieces of longer lengths in the novelette, novella, and novel categories. The Hugo Awards have been described as "a fine showcase for speculative fiction" and "the best known literary award for science fiction writing".

The Hugo Award for Best Short Story has been awarded annually since 1955, except in 1957. The award was titled "Best Short Fiction" rather than "Best Short Story" in 1960–1966. During this time no Novelette category was awarded and the Novella category had not yet been established; the award was defined only as a work "of less than novel length" that was not published as a stand-alone book. In addition to the regular Hugo awards, between 1996 and 2025 Retrospective Hugo Awards or "Retro-Hugos" were available for works published 50, 75, or 100 years prior. Retro-Hugos could only be awarded for years after 1939 in which no awards were originally given. Retro-Hugos were given for short stories for 1939, 1941, 1943–1946, 1951, and 1954.

During the 79 nomination years, 224 authors have had works as finalists; 61 of these have won, including co-authors and Retro Hugos. One translator has been noted along with the author of a story written in a language other than English: Alex Woodend, in 2024, for a translation of a work from Chinese. Harlan Ellison has received the most Hugos for Best Short Story at four, Arthur C. Clarke, Larry Niven, Mike Resnick, Michael Swanwick, and Connie Willis have each won three times, and Poul Anderson, Joe Haldeman, Naomi Kritzer, and Ken Liu have won twice, the only other authors to win more than once. Resnick has received the most final ballot nominations at 18, while Swanwick has received 14; no other author has gotten more than 7. Michael A. Burstein, with 7, has the highest number of nominations without winning.

== Selection ==
Hugo Award nominees and winners are chosen by supporting or attending members of the annual World Science Fiction Convention, or Worldcon, and the presentation evening constitutes its central event. The selection process is defined in the World Science Fiction Society Constitution as instant-runoff voting with six finalists, except in the case of a tie. The short stories on the ballot are the six most-nominated by members that year, with no limit on the number of stories that can be nominated. The 1955 and 1958 awards did not include any recognition of runner-up stories, but since 1959 all six candidates have been recorded. Initial nominations are made by members in January through March, while voting on the ballot of six finalists is performed roughly in April through July, subject to change depending on when that year's Worldcon is held. Prior to 2017, the final ballot was five works; it was changed that year to six, with each initial nominator limited to five nominations. Worldcons are generally held near Labor Day, and are held in a different city around the world each year. Members are permitted to vote "no award", if they feel that none of the finalists is deserving of the award that year, and in the case that "no award" takes the majority the Hugo is not given in that category. This happened in the Best Short Story category in 2015.

== Winners and finalists ==
In the following table, the years correspond to the date of the ceremony, rather than when the short story was first published. Each year links to the corresponding "year in literature" article. Entries with a yellow background have won the award; those with a grey background are the finalists on the short-list. If the short story was originally published in a book with other stories rather than by itself or in a magazine, the book title is included after the publisher's name.

* Winners and joint winners
+ No winner selected

Winners and finalists
Year	Author(s)	Short story	Publisher or publication	Ref.
1955	Eric Frank Russell*	"Allamagoosa"	Astounding Science-Fiction	
1956	Arthur C. Clarke*	"The Star"	Infinity Science Fiction	
1956	F. L. Wallace	"End as a World"	Galaxy Science Fiction	
1956	James Blish	"King of the Hill"	Infinity Science Fiction	
1956	Algis Budrys	"Nobody Bothers Gus"	Astounding Science-Fiction	
1956	Cordwainer Smith	"The Game of Rat and Dragon"	Galaxy Science Fiction	
1956	Ray Bradbury	"The Dragon"	Esquire	
1956	Robert Sheckley	"Spy Story"	Playboy	
1956	Theodore Sturgeon	"Twink"	Galaxy Science Fiction	
1958	Avram Davidson*	"Or All the Seas with Oysters"	Galaxy Science Fiction	
1959	Robert Bloch*	"That Hell-Bound Train"	The Magazine of Fantasy & Science Fiction	
1959	Anton Lee Baker	"They've Been Working On..."	Astounding Science-Fiction	
1959	Alfred Bester	"The Men Who Murdered Mohammed"	The Magazine of Fantasy & Science Fiction	
1959	J. F. Bone	"Triggerman"	Astounding Science-Fiction	
1959	Algis Budrys	"The Edge of the Sea"	Venture Science Fiction	
1959	C. M. Kornbluth	"The Advent on Channel Twelve"	Star Science Fiction Stories #4 (Ballantine Books)	
1959	C. M. Kornbluth	"Theory of Rocketry"	The Magazine of Fantasy & Science Fiction	
1959	Fritz Leiber	"Rump-Titty-Titty-Tum-Tah-Tee"	The Magazine of Fantasy & Science Fiction	
1959	Stanley Mullen	"Space to Swing a Cat"	Astounding Science-Fiction	
1959	Manly Wade Wellman	"Nine Yards of Other Cloth"	The Magazine of Fantasy & Science Fiction	
1960 (Note: In 1960–66, awarded for the "Best Short Fiction", defined only as a work "of less than novel length" that was not published as a stand-alone book. During these years, both nominees and winners ranged from short story to novella in length.)	Daniel Keyes*	"Flowers for Algernon"	The Magazine of Fantasy & Science Fiction	
1960	Philip José Farmer	"The Alley Man"	The Magazine of Fantasy & Science Fiction	
1960	Alfred Bester	"The Pi Man"	The Magazine of Fantasy & Science Fiction	
1960	Theodore Sturgeon	"The Man Who Lost the Sea"	The Magazine of Fantasy & Science Fiction	
1960	Ralph Williams	"Cat and Mouse"	Astounding Science-Fiction	
1961	Poul Anderson*	"The Longest Voyage"	Analog Science Fact & Fiction	
1961	Pauline Ashwell	"The Lost Kafoozalum"	Analog Science Fact & Fiction	
1961	Philip José Farmer	"Open to Me, My Sister" (aka. "My Sister's Brother")	The Magazine of Fantasy & Science Fiction	
1961	Theodore Sturgeon	"Need"	Beyond Fantasy Fiction	
1962	Brian Aldiss*	Hothouse (series)	The Magazine of Fantasy & Science Fiction	
1962	Lloyd Biggle, Jr.	"Monument"	Analog Science Fact & Fiction	
1962	Fritz Leiber	"Scylla's Daughter"	Fantastic	
1962	Mack Reynolds	"Status Quo"	Analog Science Fact & Fiction	
1962	James H. Schmitz	"Lion Loose"	Analog Science Fact & Fiction	
1963	Jack Vance*	"The Dragon Masters"	Galaxy Science Fiction	
1963	Gary Jennings	"Myrrha"	The Magazine of Fantasy & Science Fiction	
1963	Fritz Leiber	"The Unholy Grail"	Fantastic	
1963	Theodore Sturgeon	"When You Care, When You Love"	The Magazine of Fantasy & Science Fiction	
1963	Thomas Burnett Swann	"Where Is the Bird of Fire?"	Science Fantasy	
1964	Poul Anderson*	"No Truce with Kings"	The Magazine of Fantasy & Science Fiction	
1964	Rick Raphael	"Code Three "	Analog Science Fact & Fiction	
1964	Roger Zelazny	"A Rose for Ecclesiastes"	The Magazine of Fantasy & Science Fiction	
1964	Edgar Rice Burroughs	"Savage Pellucidar"	Amazing Stories	
1965	Gordon R. Dickson*	"Soldier, Ask Not"	Galaxy Science Fiction	
1965	Rick Raphael	"Once a Cop"	Analog Science Fact & Fiction	
1965	Robert F. Young	"Little Dog Gone"	Worlds of Tomorrow	
1966	Harlan Ellison*	""Repent, Harlequin!" Said the Ticktockman"	Galaxy Science Fiction	
1966	Poul Anderson	"Marque and Reprisal"	The Magazine of Fantasy & Science Fiction	
1966	Philip José Farmer	"Day of the Great Shout"	Worlds of Tomorrow	
1966	Fritz Leiber	"Stardock"	Fantastic	
1966	Roger Zelazny	"The Doors of His Face, the Lamps of His Mouth"	The Magazine of Fantasy & Science Fiction	
1967	Larry Niven*	"Neutron Star"	If	
1967	Brian Aldiss	"Man In His Time"	Who Can Replace a Man? (Signet Books)	
1967	Harlan Ellison	"Delusions for a Dragon Slayer"	Knight	
1967	Raymond F. Jones	"Rat Race"	Analog Science Fact & Fiction	
1967	Richard McKenna	"The Secret Place"	Orbit #1 (Putnam Publishing Group)	
1967	Fred Saberhagen	"Mr. Jester"	If	
1967	Bob Shaw	"Light of Other Days"	Analog Science Fact & Fiction	
1967	Roger Zelazny	"Comes Now the Power"	Magazine of Horror	
1968	Harlan Ellison*	"I Have No Mouth, and I Must Scream"	If	
1968	Larry Niven	"The Jigsaw Man"	Dangerous Visions (Doubleday)	
1968	Samuel R. Delany	"Aye, and Gomorrah"	Dangerous Visions (Doubleday)	
1969	Harlan Ellison*	"The Beast That Shouted Love at the Heart of the World"	Galaxy Science Fiction	
1969	Larry Niven	"All the Myriad Ways"	Galaxy Science Fiction	
1969	Terry Carr	"The Dance of the Changer and the Three"	The Farthest Reaches (Pocket Books)	
1969	Betsy Curtis	"The Steiger Effect"	Analog Science Fact & Fiction	
1969	Damon Knight	"Masks"	Playboy	
1970	Samuel R. Delany*	"Time Considered as a Helix of Semi-Precious Stones"	New Worlds	
1970	Robert Silverberg	"Passengers"	Orbit #4 (Putnam Publishing Group)	
1970	Larry Niven	"Not Long Before the End"	The Magazine of Fantasy & Science Fiction	
1970	Gregory Benford	"Deeper than the Darkness"	The Magazine of Fantasy & Science Fiction	
1970	Ursula K. Le Guin	"Winter's King"	Orbit #5 (Putnam Publishing Group)	
1971	Theodore Sturgeon*	"Slow Sculpture"	Galaxy Science Fiction	
1971	R. A. Lafferty	"Continued on Next Rock"	Orbit #7 (Putnam Publishing Group)	
1971	Gordon R. Dickson	"Jean Duprès"	Nova #1 (Delacorte Press)	
1971	Keith Laumer	"In the Queue"	Orbit #7 (Putnam Publishing Group)	
1971	Ben Bova	"Brillo"	Analog Science Fact & Fiction	
1972	Larry Niven*	"Inconstant Moon"	All the Myriad Ways (Ballantine Books)	
1972	Ursula K. Le Guin	"Vaster than Empires and More Slow"	New Dimensions #1 (Doubleday)	
1972	Clifford D. Simak	"The Autumn Land"	The Magazine of Fantasy & Science Fiction	
1972	Stephen Tall	"The Bear with the Knot on His Tail"	The Magazine of Fantasy & Science Fiction	
1972	R. A. Lafferty	"Sky"	New Dimensions #1 (Doubleday)	
1972	George Alec Effinger	"All the Last Wars at Once"	Universe #1 (Bantam Spectra)	
1973	R. A. Lafferty*	"Eurema's Dam"	New Dimensions #2 (Doubleday)	
1973	Frederik Pohl*	"The Meeting"	The Magazine of Fantasy & Science Fiction	
1973	C. M. Kornbluth*	"The Meeting"	The Magazine of Fantasy & Science Fiction	
1973	Robert Silverberg	"When We Went to See the End of the World"	Universe #2 (Bantam Spectra)	
1973	James Tiptree, Jr.	"And I Awoke and Found Me Here on the Cold Hill's Side"	The Magazine of Fantasy & Science Fiction	
1973	Joanna Russ	"When It Changed"	Again, Dangerous Visions (Doubleday)	
1974	Ursula K. Le Guin*	"The Ones Who Walk Away from Omelas"	New Dimensions #3 (Doubleday)	
1974	George R. R. Martin	"With Morning Comes Mistfall"	Analog Science Fact & Fiction	
1974	Clifford D. Simak	"Construction Shack"	If	
1974	Vonda N. McIntyre	"Wings"	The Alien Condition (Ballantine Books)	
1975	Larry Niven*	"The Hole Man"	Analog Science Fact & Fiction	
1975	Alfred Bester	"The Four-Hour Fugue"	Analog Science Fact & Fiction	
1975	Michael Bishop	"Cathadonian Odyssey"	The Magazine of Fantasy & Science Fiction	
1975	Ursula K. Le Guin	"The Day Before the Revolution"	Galaxy Science Fiction	
1975	Robert Silverberg	"Schwartz Between the Galaxies"	Stellar #1 (Ballantine Books)	
1976	Fritz Leiber*	"Catch That Zeppelin!"	The Magazine of Fantasy & Science Fiction	
1976	Harlan Ellison	"Croatoan"	The Magazine of Fantasy & Science Fiction	
1976	P. J. Plauger	"Child of All Ages"	Analog Science Fact & Fiction	
1976	Richard A. Lupoff	"Sail the Tide of Mourning"	New Dimensions #5 (Doubleday)	
1976	Michael Bishop	"Rogue Tomato"	New Dimensions #5 (Doubleday)	
1976	Gregory Benford	"Doing Lennon"	Analog Science Fact & Fiction	
1977	Joe Haldeman*	"Tricentennial"	Analog Science Fact & Fiction	
1977	Charles L. Grant	"A Crowd of Shadows"	The Magazine of Fantasy & Science Fiction	
1977	Damon Knight	"I See You"	The Magazine of Fantasy & Science Fiction	
1977	James White	"Custom Fitting"	Stellar #2 (Ballantine Books)	
1978	Harlan Ellison*	"Jeffty Is Five"	The Magazine of Fantasy & Science Fiction	
1978	John Varley	"Air Raid"	Asimov's Science Fiction	
1978	Spider Robinson	"Dog Day Evening"	Analog Science Fact & Fiction	
1978	Randall Garrett	"Lauralyn"	Analog Science Fact & Fiction	
1978	James Tiptree, Jr.	"Time-Sharing Angel"	The Magazine of Fantasy & Science Fiction	
1979	C. J. Cherryh*	"Cassandra"	The Magazine of Fantasy & Science Fiction	
1979	Harlan Ellison	"Count the Clock that Tells the Time"	Omni	
1979	Joan D. Vinge	"View From a Height"	Analog Science Fact & Fiction	
1979	Edward Bryant	"Stone"	The Magazine of Fantasy & Science Fiction	
1979	Ian Watson	"The Very Slow Time Machine"	Anticipations (Faber and Faber)	
1980	George R. R. Martin*	"The Way of Cross and Dragon"	Omni	
1980	Orson Scott Card	"Unaccompanied Sonata"	Omni	
1980	Ted Reynolds	"Can These Bones Live?"	Analog Science Fact & Fiction	
1980	Edward Bryant	"giANTS"	Analog Science Fact & Fiction	
1980	Connie Willis	"Daisy, In the Sun"	Galileo	
1981	Clifford D. Simak*	"Grotto of the Dancing Deer"	Analog Science Fact & Fiction	
1981	Robert Silverberg	"Our Lady of the Sauropods"	Omni	
1981	Susan C. Petrey	"Spidersong"	The Magazine of Fantasy & Science Fiction	
1981	Jeff Duntemann	"Cold Hands"	Asimov's Science Fiction	
1981	Jeff Duntemann	"Guardian"	Asimov's Science Fiction	
1982	John Varley*	"The Pusher"	The Magazine of Fantasy & Science Fiction	
1982	Gene Wolfe	"The Woman the Unicorn Loved"	Asimov's Science Fiction	
1982	Somtow Sucharitkul	"Absent Thee from Felicity Awhile"	Analog Science Fact & Fiction	
1982	George Guthridge	"The Quiet"	The Magazine of Fantasy & Science Fiction	
1983	Spider Robinson*	"Melancholy Elephants"	Analog Science Fact & Fiction	
1983	Ursula K. Le Guin	"Sur"	The New Yorker	
1983	James Tiptree, Jr.	"The Boy Who Waterskied to Forever"	The Magazine of Fantasy & Science Fiction	
1983	Bruce Sterling	"Spider Rose"	The Magazine of Fantasy & Science Fiction	
1983	Howard Waldrop	"Ike at the Mike"	Omni	
1984	Octavia E. Butler*	"Speech Sounds"	Asimov's Science Fiction	
1984	Frederik Pohl	"Servant of the People"	Analog Science Fact & Fiction	
1984	Hilbert Schenck	"The Geometry of Narrative"	Analog Science Fact & Fiction	
1984	Gardner Dozois	"The Peacemaker"	Asimov's Science Fiction	
1984	William F. Wu	"Wong's Lost and Found Emporium"	Amazing Stories	
1985	David Brin*	"The Crystal Spheres"	Analog Science Fact & Fiction	
1985	George Alec Effinger	"The Aliens Who Knew, I Mean, Everything"	The Magazine of Fantasy & Science Fiction	
1985	Lee Killough	"Symphony for a Lost Traveler"	Analog Science Fact & Fiction	
1985	Lucius Shepard	"Salvador"	The Magazine of Fantasy & Science Fiction	
1985	Kim Stanley Robinson	"Ridge Running"	The Magazine of Fantasy & Science Fiction	
1985	Steven Gould	"Rory"	Analog Science Fact & Fiction	
1986	Frederik Pohl*	"Fermi and Frost"	Asimov's Science Fiction	
1986	Howard Waldrop	"Flying Saucer Rock & Roll"	Omni	
1986	John Crowley	"Snow"	Omni	
1986	Bruce Sterling	"Dinner in Audoghast"	Asimov's Science Fiction	
1986	William F. Wu	"Hong's Bluff"	Omni	
1987	Greg Bear*	"Tangents"	Omni	
1987	Isaac Asimov	"Robot Dreams"	Robot Dreams (Berkley Books)	
1987	Nancy Springer	"The Boy Who Plaited Manes"	The Magazine of Fantasy & Science Fiction	
1987	David S. Garnett	"Still Life"	The Magazine of Fantasy & Science Fiction	
1987	James Patrick Kelly	"Rat"	The Magazine of Fantasy & Science Fiction	
1988	Lawrence Watt-Evans*	"Why I Left Harry's All-Night Hamburgers"	Asimov's Science Fiction	
1988	Kate Wilhelm	"Forever Yours, Anna"	Omni	
1988	Pat Cadigan	"Angel"	Asimov's Science Fiction	
1988	Howard Waldrop	"Night of the Cooters"	Omni	
1988	Karen Joy Fowler	"The Faithful Companion at Forty"	Asimov's Science Fiction	
1988	Lisa Goldstein	"Cassandra's Photographs"	Asimov's Science Fiction	
1989	Mike Resnick*	"Kirinyaga"	Fantasy & Science Fiction	
1989	David Brin	"The Giving Plague"	Interzone	
1989	Geoffrey A. Landis	"Ripples in the Dirac Sea"	Asimov's Science Fiction	
1989	Bruce Sterling	"Our Neural Chernobyl"	Fantasy & Science Fiction	
1989	Eileen Gunn	"Stable Strategies for Middle Management"	Asimov's Science Fiction	
1989	Jack McDevitt	"The Fort Moxie Branch"	Full Spectrum (Doubleday)	
1990	Suzy McKee Charnas*	"Boobs"	Asimov's Science Fiction	
1990	Orson Scott Card	"Lost Boys"	Fantasy & Science Fiction	
1990	Eileen Gunn	"Computer Friendly"	Asimov's Science Fiction	
1990	Larry Niven	"The Return of William Proxmire"	What Might Have Been? Vol. 1: Alternate Empires (Bantam Spectra)	
1990	Michael Swanwick	"The Edge of the World"	Asimov's Science Fiction	
1990	Bruce Sterling	"Dori Bangs"	Asimov's Science Fiction	
1991	Terry Bisson*	"Bears Discover Fire"	Asimov's Science Fiction	
1991	Connie Willis	"Cibola"	Asimov's Science Fiction	
1991	Charles Sheffield	"Godspeed"	Analog Science Fact & Fiction	
1991	Robert Reed	"The Utility Man"	Asimov's Science Fiction	
1991	W. R. Thompson	"VRM-547"	Analog Science Fact & Fiction	
1992	Geoffrey A. Landis*	"A Walk in the Sun"	Asimov's Science Fiction	
1992	Mike Resnick	"One Perfect Morning, With Jackals"	Asimov's Science Fiction	
1992	Connie Willis	"In the Late Cretaceous"	Asimov's Science Fiction	
1992	Mike Resnick	"Winter Solstice"	Fantasy & Science Fiction	
1992	Terry Bisson	"Press Ann"	Asimov's Science Fiction	
1992	John Kessel	"Buffalo"	Fantasy & Science Fiction	
1992	Martha Soukup	"Dog's Life"	Amazing Stories	
1993	Connie Willis*	"Even the Queen"	Asimov's Science Fiction	
1993	Nancy Kress	"The Mountain to Mohammed"	Asimov's Science Fiction	
1993	Mike Resnick	"The Lotus and the Spear"	Asimov's Science Fiction	
1993	Martha Soukup	"The Arbitrary Placement of Walls"	Asimov's Science Fiction	
1993	Nicholas A. DiChario	"The Winterberry"	Alternate Kennedys (Tor Books)	
1994	Connie Willis*	"Death on the Nile"	Asimov's Science Fiction	
1994	Mike Resnick	"Mwalimu in the Squared Circle"	Asimov's Science Fiction	
1994	Martha Soukup	"The Story So Far"	Full Spectrum 4 (Doubleday)	
1994	Bridget McKenna	"The Good Pup"	Fantasy & Science Fiction	
1994	Terry Bisson	"England Underway"	Omni	
1995	Joe Haldeman*	"None So Blind"	Asimov's Science Fiction	
1995	Kate Wilhelm	"I Know What You're Thinking"	Asimov's Science Fiction	
1995	Mike Resnick	"Barnaby in Exile"	Asimov's Science Fiction	
1995	Terry Bisson	"Dead Man's Curve"	Asimov's Science Fiction	
1995	Barry N. Malzberg	"Understanding Entropy"	SF Age	
1995	M. Shayne Bell	"Mrs. Lincoln's China"	Asimov's Science Fiction	
1996	Maureen F. McHugh*	"The Lincoln Train"	Fantasy & Science Fiction	
1996	Esther Friesner	"A Birthday"	Fantasy & Science Fiction	
1996	Michael A. Burstein	"TeleAbsence"	Analog Science Fiction and Fact	
1996	Tony Daniel	"Life on the Moon"	Asimov's Science Fiction	
1996	Michael Swanwick	"Walking Out"	Asimov's Science Fiction	
1997	Connie Willis*	"The Soul Selects Her Own Society: Invasion and Repulsion: A Chronological Reinterpretation of Two of Emily Dickinson's Poems: A Wellsian Perspective"	Asimov's Science Fiction	
1997	James White	"Un-Birthday Boy"	Analog Science Fiction and Fact	
1997	Michael Swanwick	"The Dead"	Starlight #1 (Tor Books)	
1997	Robert Reed	"Decency"	Asimov's Science Fiction	
1997	John Crowley	"Gone"	Fantasy & Science Fiction	
1998	Mike Resnick*	"The 43 Antarean Dynasties"	Asimov's Science Fiction	
1998	James Patrick Kelly	"Itsy Bitsy Spider"	Asimov's Science Fiction	
1998	Gene Wolfe	"No Planets Strike"	Fantasy & Science Fiction	
1998	Robert J. Sawyer	"The Hand You're Dealt"	Free Space (Tor Books)	
1998	Karen Joy Fowler	"Standing Room Only"	Asimov's Science Fiction	
1998	Andy Duncan	"Beluthahatchie"	Asimov's Science Fiction	
1999	Michael Swanwick*	"The Very Pulse of the Machine"	Asimov's Science Fiction	
1999	Bruce Sterling	"Maneki Neko"	Fantasy & Science Fiction	
1999	Michael Swanwick	"Radiant Doors"	Asimov's Science Fiction	
1999	Michael Swanwick	"Wild Minds"	Asimov's Science Fiction	
1999	Michael A. Burstein	"Cosmic Corkscrew"	Analog Science Fiction and Fact	
1999	Robert Reed	"Whiptail"	Asimov's Science Fiction	
2000	Michael Swanwick*	"Scherzo with Tyrannosaur"	Asimov's Science Fiction	
2000	Michael Swanwick	"Ancient Engines"	Asimov's Science Fiction	
2000	Mike Resnick	"Hothouse Flowers"	Asimov's Science Fiction	
2000	Terry Bisson	"macs"	Fantasy & Science Fiction	
2000	Nicholas A. DiChario	"Sarajevo"	Fantasy & Science Fiction	
2001	David Langford*	"Different Kinds of Darkness"	Fantasy & Science Fiction	
2001	Michael A. Burstein	"Kaddish for the Last Survivor"	Analog Science Fiction and Fact	
2001	Michael Swanwick	"Moon Dogs"	Asimov's Science Fiction	
2001	Mike Resnick	"The Elephants on Neptune"	Asimov's Science Fiction	
2001	Stephen Baxter	"The Gravity Mine"	Asimov's Science Fiction	
2002	Michael Swanwick*	"The Dog Said Bow-Wow"	Asimov's Science Fiction	
2002	Ursula K. Le Guin	"The Bones of the Earth"	Tales from Earthsea (Harcourt)	
2002	Mike Resnick	"Old MacDonald Had a Farm"	Asimov's Science Fiction	
2002	Stephen Baxter	"The Ghost Pit"	Asimov's Science Fiction	
2002	Michael A. Burstein	"Spaceships"	Analog Science Fiction and Fact	
2003	Geoffrey A. Landis*	"Falling onto Mars"	Analog Science Fiction and Fact	
2003	Michael Swanwick	"'Hello,' Said the Stick"	Analog Science Fiction and Fact	
2003	Michael Swanwick	"The Little Cat Laughed to See Such Sport"	Asimov's Science Fiction	
2003	Jeffrey Ford	"Creation"	Fantasy & Science Fiction	
2003	Molly Gloss	"Lambing Season"	Asimov's Science Fiction	
2004	Neil Gaiman*	"A Study in Emerald"	Shadows Over Baker Street (Del Rey Books)	
2004	Michael A. Burstein	"Paying It Forward"	Analog Science Fiction and Fact	
2004	Mike Resnick	"Robots Don't Cry"	Asimov's Science Fiction	
2004	Joe Haldeman	"Four Short Novels"	Fantasy & Science Fiction	
2004	David D. Levine	"The Tale of the Golden Eagle"	Fantasy & Science Fiction	
2005	Mike Resnick*	"Travels with My Cats"	Asimov's Science Fiction	
2005	James Patrick Kelly	"The Best Christmas Ever"	Scifi.com	
2005	Mike Resnick	"A Princess of Earth"	Asimov's Science Fiction	
2005	Robert J. Sawyer	"Shed Skin"	Analog Science Fiction and Fact	
2005	Michael A. Burstein	"Decisions"	Analog Science Fiction and Fact	
2006	David D. Levine*	"Tk'tk'tk"	Asimov's Science Fiction	
2006	Michael A. Burstein	"Seventy-Five Years"	Analog Science Fiction and Fact	
2006	Dominic Green	"The Clockwork Atom Bomb"	Interzone	
2006	Margo Lanagan	"Singing My Sister Down"	Black Juice (Eos)	
2006	Mike Resnick	"Down Memory Lane"	Asimov's Science Fiction	
2007	Tim Pratt*	"Impossible Dreams"	Asimov's Science Fiction	
2007	Neil Gaiman	"How to Talk to Girls at Parties"	Fragile Things (William Morrow and Company)	
2007	Robert Reed	"Eight Episodes"	Asimov's Science Fiction	
2007	Bruce McAllister	"Kin"	Asimov's Science Fiction	
2007	Benjamin Rosenbaum	"The House Beyond Your Sky"	Strange Horizons	
2008	Elizabeth Bear*	"Tideline"	Asimov's Science Fiction	
2008	Michael Swanwick	"A Small Room in Koboldtown"	Asimov's Science Fiction	
2008	Stephen Baxter	"Last Contact"	The Solaris Book of New Science Fiction #1 (Solaris Books)	
2008	Ken MacLeod	"Who's Afraid of Wolf 359?"	The New Space Opera (Eos)	
2008	Mike Resnick	"Distant Replay"	Asimov's Science Fiction	
2009	Ted Chiang*	"Exhalation"	Eclipse #2 (Night Shade Books)	
2009	Kij Johnson	"26 Monkeys, Also the Abyss"	Asimov's Science Fiction	
2009	Michael Swanwick	"From Babel's Fall'n Glory We Fled"	Asimov's Science Fiction	
2009	Mary Robinette Kowal	"Evil Robot Monkey"	The Solaris Book of New Science Fiction #2 (Solaris Books)	
2009	Mike Resnick	"Article of Faith"	Jim Baen's Universe	
2010	Will McIntosh*	"Bridesicle"	Asimov's Science Fiction	
2010	Mike Resnick	"The Bride of Frankenstein"	Asimov's Science Fiction	
2010	Lawrence M. Schoen	"The Moment"	Footprints (Hadley Rille Books)	
2010	N. K. Jemisin	"Non-Zero Probabilities"	Clarkesworld Magazine	
2010	Kij Johnson	"Spar"	Clarkesworld Magazine	
2011	Mary Robinette Kowal*	"For Want of a Nail"	Asimov's Science Fiction	
2011	Carrie Vaughn	"Amaryllis"	Lightspeed Magazine	
2011	Kij Johnson	"Ponies"	Tor.com	
2011	Peter Watts	"The Things"	Clarkesworld Magazine	
2012	Ken Liu*	"The Paper Menagerie"	Fantasy & Science Fiction	
2012	E. Lily Yu	"The Cartographer Wasps and the Anarchist Bees"	Clarkesworld Magazine	
2012	Mike Resnick	"The Homecoming"	Asimov's Science Fiction	
2012	Nancy Fulda	"Movement"	Asimov's Science Fiction	
2012	John Scalzi	"The Shadow War of the Night Dragons: Book One: The Dead City: Prologue"	Tor.com	
2013	Ken Liu*	"Mono no Aware"	The Future is Japanese (Viz Media)	
2013	Aliette de Bodard	"Immersion"	Clarkesworld Magazine	
2013	Kij Johnson	"Mantis Wives"	Clarkesworld Magazine	
2014	John Chu*	"The Water That Falls on You from Nowhere"	Tor.com	
2014	Rachel Swirsky	"If You Were a Dinosaur, My Love"	Apex Magazine	
2014	Thomas Olde Heuvelt	"The Ink Readers of Doi Saket"	Tor.com	
2014	Sofia Samatar	"Selkie Stories Are for Losers"	Strange Horizons	
2015	(no award)+			(Note: Several categories, including Best Short Story, were awarded to "No award" in 2015 in response to the Sad Puppies and Rabid Puppies ballot manipulation campaigns. Additionally, "Goodnight Stars" by Annie Bellet was initially nominated for Best Short Story in 2015; however, Bellet subsequently withdrew it from consideration, calling the situation a "game of political dodge ball" and emphasizing that "[a]ll joy that might have come from [the] nomination has been co-opted, ruined, or sapped away." This was the first time a nominee was withdrawn after the ballot was announced. Bellet's story was replaced on the ballot by "A Single Samurai" by Steven Diamond.)
2015	Lou Antonelli	"On a Spiritual Plain"	Sci Phi Journal	
2015	Steven Diamond	"A Single Samurai"	The Baen Big Book of Monsters (Baen Books)	
2015	Kary English	"Totaled"	Galaxy's Edge	
2015	Steve Rzasa	"Turncoat"	Riding the Red Horse (Castalia House)	
2015	John C. Wright	"The Parliament of Beasts and Birds"	The Book of Feasts & Seasons (Castalia House)	
2016	Naomi Kritzer*	"Cat Pictures Please"	Clarkesworld Magazine	
2016	S. R. Algernon	"Asymmetrical Warfare"	Nature	
2016	Juan Tabo	"If You Were an Award, My Love"	voxday.blogspot.com	
2016	S. Harris	"If You Were an Award, My Love"	voxday.blogspot.com	
2016	Charles Shao	"Seven Kill Tiger"	There Will Be War Volume X (Castalia House)	
2016	Chuck Tingle	Space Raptor Butt Invasion	Amazon Digital Services	
2017	Amal El-Mohtar*	"Seasons of Glass and Iron"	The Starlit Wood: New Fairy Tales (Saga Press)	
2017	N. K. Jemisin	"The City Born Great"	Tor.com	
2017	Alyssa Wong	"A Fist of Permutations in Lightning and Wildflowers"	Tor.com	
2017	Brooke Bolander	"Our Talons Can Crush Galaxies"	Uncanny Magazine	
2017	Carrie Vaughn	"That Game We Played During the War"	Tor.com	
2017	John C. Wright	"An Unimaginable Light"	God, Robot (Castalia House)	
2018	Rebecca Roanhorse*	"Welcome to Your Authentic Indian Experience™"	Apex Magazine	
2018	Caroline M. Yoachim	"Carnival Nine"	Beneath Ceaseless Skies	
2018	Fran Wilde	"Clearly Lettered in a Mostly Steady Hand"	Uncanny Magazine	
2018	Vina Jie-Min Prasad	"Fandom for Robots"	Uncanny Magazine	
2018	Linda Nagata	"The Martian Obelisk"	Tor.com	
2018	Ursula Vernon	"Sun, Moon, Dust"	Uncanny Magazine	
2019	Alix E. Harrow*	"A Witch's Guide to Escape: A Practical Compendium of Portal Fantasies"	Apex Magazine	
2019	Brooke Bolander	"The Tale of the Three Beautiful Raptor Sisters, and the Prince Who Was Made of Meat"	Uncanny Magazine	
2019	P. Djèlí Clark	"The Secret Lives of the Nine Negro Teeth of George Washington"	Fireside Magazine	
2019	Sarah Gailey	"STET"	Fireside Magazine	
2019	Ursula Vernon (as T. Kingfisher)	"The Rose MacGregor Drinking and Admiration Society"	Uncanny Magazine	
2019	Sarah Pinsker	"The Court Magician"	Lightspeed	
2020	S. L. Huang*	"As the Last I May Know"	Tor.com	
2020	Shiv Ramdas	"And Now His Lordship Is Laughing"	Strange Horizons	
2020	Rivers Solomon	"Blood Is Another Word for Hunger"	Tor.com	
2020	Fran Wilde	"A Catalog of Storms"	Uncanny Magazine	
2020	Alix E. Harrow	"Do Not Look Back, My Lion"	Beneath Ceaseless Skies	
2020	Nibedita Sen	"Ten Excerpts from an Annotated Bibliography on the Cannibal Women of Ratnabar Island"	Nightmare Magazine	
2021	Ursula Vernon* (as T. Kingfisher)	"Metal Like Blood in the Dark"	Uncanny Magazine	
2021	Rae Carson	"Badass Moms in the Zombie Apocalypse"	Uncanny Magazine	
2021	Vina Jie-Min Prasad	"A Guide for Working Breeds"	Made to Order: Robots and Revolution (Solaris Books)	
2021	Naomi Kritzer	"Little Free Library"	Tor.com	
2021	Yoon Ha Lee	"The Mermaid Astronaut"	Beneath Ceaseless Skies	
2021	John Wiswell	"Open House on Haunted Hill"	Diabolical Plots	
2022	Sarah Pinsker*	"Where Oaken Hearts Do Gather"	Uncanny Magazine	
2022	Alix E. Harrow	"Mr. Death"	Apex Magazine	
2022	José Pablo Iriarte	"Proof by Induction"	Uncanny Magazine	
2022	Catherynne M. Valente	"The Sin of America"	Uncanny Magazine	
2022	Seanan McGuire	"Tangles"	Magic Story (Magicthegathering.com)	
2022	Blue Neustifter	"Unknown Number"	Self-published, via Twitter	
2023	Samantha Mills*	"Rabbit Test"	Uncanny Magazine	
2023	John Wiswell	"D.I.Y."	Tor.com	
2023	Jiang Bo	"On the Razor's Edge"	Science Fiction World	
2023	Ren Qing	"Resurrection"	Future Fiction/Science Fiction World	
2023	Lu Ban	"The White Cliff"	Science Fiction World	
2023	Regina Kanyu Wang	"Zhurong on Mars"	Frontiers	
2024	Naomi Kritzer*	"Better Living Through Algorithms"	Clarkesworld Magazine	
2024	Han Song (Chinese)	"Answerless Journey"	Adventures in Space: New Short stories by Chinese & English Science Fiction Writers (Flame Tree Press)	
2024	Alex Woodend (translator)	"Answerless Journey"	Adventures in Space: New Short stories by Chinese & English Science Fiction Writers (Flame Tree Press)	
2024	P. Djèlí Clark	"How to Raise a Kraken in Your Bathtub"	Uncanny Magazine	
2024	Aliette de Bodard	"The Mausoleum's Children"	Uncanny Magazine	
2024	Rachael K. Jones	"The Sound of Children Screaming"	Nightmare Magazine	
2024	Baoshu	"Tasting the Future Delicacy Three Times"	Galaxy's Edge	
2025	Nghi Vo*	"Stitched to Skin Like Family Is"	Uncanny Magazine	
2025	Rachael K. Jones	"Five Views of the Planet Tartarus"	Lightspeed Magazine	
2025	Mary Robinette Kowal	"Marginalia"	Uncanny Magazine	
2025	Arkady Martine	"Three Faces of a Beheading"	Uncanny Magazine	
2025	Caroline M. Yoachim	"We Will Teach You How to Read | We Will Teach You How to Read"	Lightspeed Magazine	
2025	Isabel J. Kim	"Why Don't We Just Kill the Kid in the Omelas Hole"	Clarkesworld Magazine	
2026	Thomas Ha*	"In My Country"	Clarkesworld Magazine	
2026	J.R. Dawson	"Six People to Revise You"	Uncanny Magazine	
2026	Isabel J. Kim	"Wire Mother"	Clarkesworld Magazine	
2026	Samantha Mills	"10 Visions of the Future; or, Self-Care for the End of Days"	Uncanny Magazine	
2026	Effie Seiberg	"Laser Eyes Ain't Everything"	Diabolical Plots	
2026	Tia Tashiro	"Missing Helen"	Clarkesworld Magazine	

=== Retro Hugos ===
Between the 1996 Worldcon and 2025 Worldcon, the World Science Fiction Society had the concept of "Retro-Hugos", in which the Hugo award could be retroactively awarded for 50, 75, or 100 years prior. Retro-Hugos could only be awarded for years after 1939 (the year of the first Worldcon) in which no Hugos were originally awarded. Retro-Hugos were awarded eight times, for 1939, 1941, 1943–1946, 1951, and 1954.

Retro Hugo winners and nominees
Year	Year awarded	Author(s)	Short story	Publisher or publication	Ref.
1939	2014	Arthur C. Clarke*	"How We Went to Mars"	Amateur Science Stories	
1939	2014	Lester del Rey	"The Faithful"	Astounding Science-Fiction	
1939	2014	Lester del Rey	"Helen O'Loy"	Astounding Science-Fiction	
1939	2014	Ray Bradbury	"Hollerbochen's Dilemma"	Imagination!	
1939	2014	L. Sprague de Camp	"Hyperpilosity"	Astounding Science-Fiction	
1941	2016	Isaac Asimov*	"Robbie"	Super Science Stories	
1941	2016	Leigh Brackett	"Martian Quest"	Astounding Science Fiction	
1941	2016	Robert A. Heinlein	"Requiem"	Astounding Science Fiction	
1941	2016	Leigh Brackett	"The Stellar Legion"	Planet Stories	
1941	2016	Jorge Luis Borges	"Tlön, Uqbar, Orbis Tertius"	Sur	
1943	2018	C. L. Moore* (as Lewis Padgett)	"The Twonky"	Astounding Science Fiction	
1943	2018	Henry Kuttner* (as Lewis Padgett)	"The Twonky"	Astounding Science Fiction	
1943	2018	Fredric Brown	"Etaoin Shrdlu"	Unknown	
1943	2018	Donald A. Wollheim (as Martin Pearson)	"Mimic"	Astonishing Stories	
1943	2018	Hal Clement	"Proof"	Astounding Science Fiction	
1943	2018	Isaac Asimov	"Runaround"	Astounding Science Fiction	
1943	2018	Fritz Leiber	"The Sunken Land"	Unknown	
1944	2019	Ray Bradbury*	"King of the Gray Spaces" (aka "R is for Rocket")	Famous Fantastic Mysteries	
1944	2019	Isaac Asimov	"Death Sentence"	Astounding Science Fiction	
1944	2019	C. L. Moore	"Doorway into Time"	Famous Fantastic Mysteries	
1944	2019	Edmond Hamilton	"Exile"	Super Science Stories	
1944	2019	Anthony Boucher (as H. H. Holmes)	"Q.U.R."	Astounding Science-Fiction	
1944	2019	Robert Bloch	"Yours Truly – Jack the Ripper"	Weird Tales	
1945	2020	Ray Bradbury*	"I, Rocket"	Amazing Stories	
1945	2020	Fredric Brown	"And the Gods Laughed"	Planet Stories	
1945	2020	Clifford D. Simak	"Desertion"	Astounding Science-Fiction	
1945	2020	A. E. van Vogt	"Far Centaurus"	Astounding Science-Fiction	
1945	2020	Clifford D. Simak	"Huddling Place"	Astounding Science-Fiction	
1945	2020	Isaac Asimov	"The Wedge" ("The Traders")	Astounding Science-Fiction	
1946	1996	Hal Clement*	"Uncommon Sense"	Astounding Science-Fiction	
1946	1996	Murray Leinster	"The Ethical Equations"	Astounding Science-Fiction	
1946	1996	Fredric Brown	"The Waveries"	Astounding Science-Fiction	
1946	1996	Lewis Padgett	"What You Need"	Astounding Science-Fiction	
1946	1996	Raymond F. Jones	"Correspondence Course"	Astounding Science-Fiction	
1951	2001	Damon Knight*	"To Serve Man"	Galaxy Science Fiction	
1951	2001	Fritz Leiber	"Coming Attraction"	Galaxy Science Fiction	
1951	2001	Richard Matheson	"Born of Man and Woman"	The Magazine of Fantasy and Science Fiction	
1951	2001	A. J. Deutsch	"A Subway Named Mobius"	Astounding Science-Fiction	
1951	2001	Reginald Bretnor	"The Gnurrs Come from the Voodvork Out"	The Magazine of Fantasy and Science Fiction	
1954	2004	Arthur C. Clarke*	"The Nine Billion Names of God"	Star Science Fiction Stories #1 (Ballantine Books)	
1954	2004	Jerome Bixby	"It's a Good Life"	Star Science Fiction Stories #2 (Ballantine Books)	
1954	2004	Alfred Bester	"Star Light, Star Bright"	The Magazine of Fantasy & Science Fiction	
1954	2004	Theodore Sturgeon	"A Saucer of Loneliness"	Galaxy Science Fiction	
1954	2004	Robert Sheckley	"Seventh Victim"	Galaxy Science Fiction	

== See also ==
- Nebula Award for Best Short Story
