= A Noose of Light =

1986 novel by Seamus Cullen

A Noose of Light is a novel by Seamus Cullen published in 1986.

== Plot summary ==
A Noose of Light is a novel in which two spirits temporarily possess Anwar, a sage who has lived on a small hill in the desert, acting as an oracle dispensing advice, for as long as anyone remembers. Maryam comes to him for guidance and, under the influence of the spirits, he tells her to go to Mecca and become a prostitute. She obeys his instructions. The two spirits who caused this were djinni and they did it because they lust after human women, so her actions set up a series of events that create humorous chaos between the djinni who try to enjoy her and humans.

== Reception ==
Dave Langford reviewed A Noose of Light for White Dwarf #78, and stated that "the humour and cruelty are faithful to the source: evil-doers are unremittingly punished, while the reward of virtue is often skimpy until after you're dead. Unevenly paced, but an OK read".

== Reviews ==
- Review by Chris Morgan (1986) in Fantasy Review, April 1986
- Review by Don D'Ammassa (1986) in Science Fiction Chronicle, #84 September 1986
- Review by Mark Greener (1986) in Vector 135
