= Science Fiction Master Index of Names =

Science Fiction Master Index of Names is a book by Keith L. Justice published in 1987. It is a guide to sources involving critical mentions of science fiction.

== Reception ==
Dave Langford reviewed Science Fiction Master Index of Names for White Dwarf #91, and stated that "Despite [...] biggish omissions, the book could still be handy in its extremely specialist field."

== Reviews ==
- Review by Paul Kincaid (1987) in Vector 138
- Science Fiction Chronicle
