= Master of His Fate =

Novel by James MacLaren Cobban

Master of His Fate is a novel by James MacLaren Cobban published in 1890.

== Plot summary ==
Master of His Fate is a novel in which psychic vampirism is caused by "Nervous Ether".

== Reception ==
Dave Langford reviewed Master of His Fate for White Dwarf #92, and stated that "It's [sic] historical interest isn't sustained by the feeble and florid writing."

== Reviews ==
- Review by Tom Jones (1987) in Vector 139
- Review by Don D'Ammassa (1987) in Science Fiction Chronicle, #97 October 1987
