= A Walk in the Sun =

A Walk in the Sun may refer to:

- A Walk in the Sun (1944), a novel by Harry Brown
  - A Walk in the Sun (1945 film), a 1945 World War II war film adaptation of Harry Brown's novel
    - "A Walk in the Sun", song and album by Earl Robinson, written for the 1945 film
- A Walk in the Sun (1978 film), a 1978 Swedish drama film
- "A Walk in the Sun" (short story), a 1991 science fiction short story by Geoffrey A. Landis
