= The Sceptre Mortal =

1985 novel by Derek Sawde

The Sceptre Mortal is a novel by Derek Sawde published in 1985.

== Plot summary ==
The Sceptre Mortal is a novel in which there is a quest for the Sceptre Mortal.

== Reception ==
Dave Langford reviewed The Sceptre Mortal for White Dwarf #72, and stated that "what can you make of an author who, after 258 solemnly humourless pages, offers a chapter called 'Pit of the Werebats'? Painful."

== Reviews ==
- Review by Pauline Morgan (1985) in Fantasy Review, November 1985
- Review by David V. Barrett (1985) in Vector 129
- Review by Don D'Ammassa (1986) in Science Fiction Chronicle, #86 November 1986
