= Portraits of His Children (collection) =

1987 short story collection by George R. R. Martin

First edition (publ. Dark Harvest)

Portraits of His Children is the sixth short story collection by author George R.R. Martin. The collection was first published in July 1987 by Dark Harvest. It contains 11 short stories.

The hardcover edition featured interior artwork by illustrators Val Lakey Lindahn and Ron Lindahn.

The title story, originally published in November 1985 in Asimov's Science Fiction, won the 1986 Nebula Award for Best Novelette and the Science Fiction Chronicle Readers Poll, and was nominated for the Hugo Award for Best Novelette.

== Contents ==
#	Title	Year	Note
1	"Closing Time"	1982	
2	"The Glass Flower"	1986	Novelette
3	The Ice Dragon	1980	Novelette
4	"In the Lost Lands"	1982	
5	"The Last Super Bowl Game"	1975	Novelette
6	"The Lonely Songs of Laren Dorr"	1976	Previously collected in Songs of Stars and Shadows (1977)
7	"Portraits of His Children"	1985	Novelette
8	"Under Siege"	1985	Novelette
9	"Unsound Variations"	1982	Novella
10	"With Morning Comes Mistfall"	1973	Previously collected in A Song for Lya (1976)
11	"The Second Kind of Loneliness"	1972	Previously collected in A Song for Lya (1976)
