= Cat and mouse =

English-language idiom

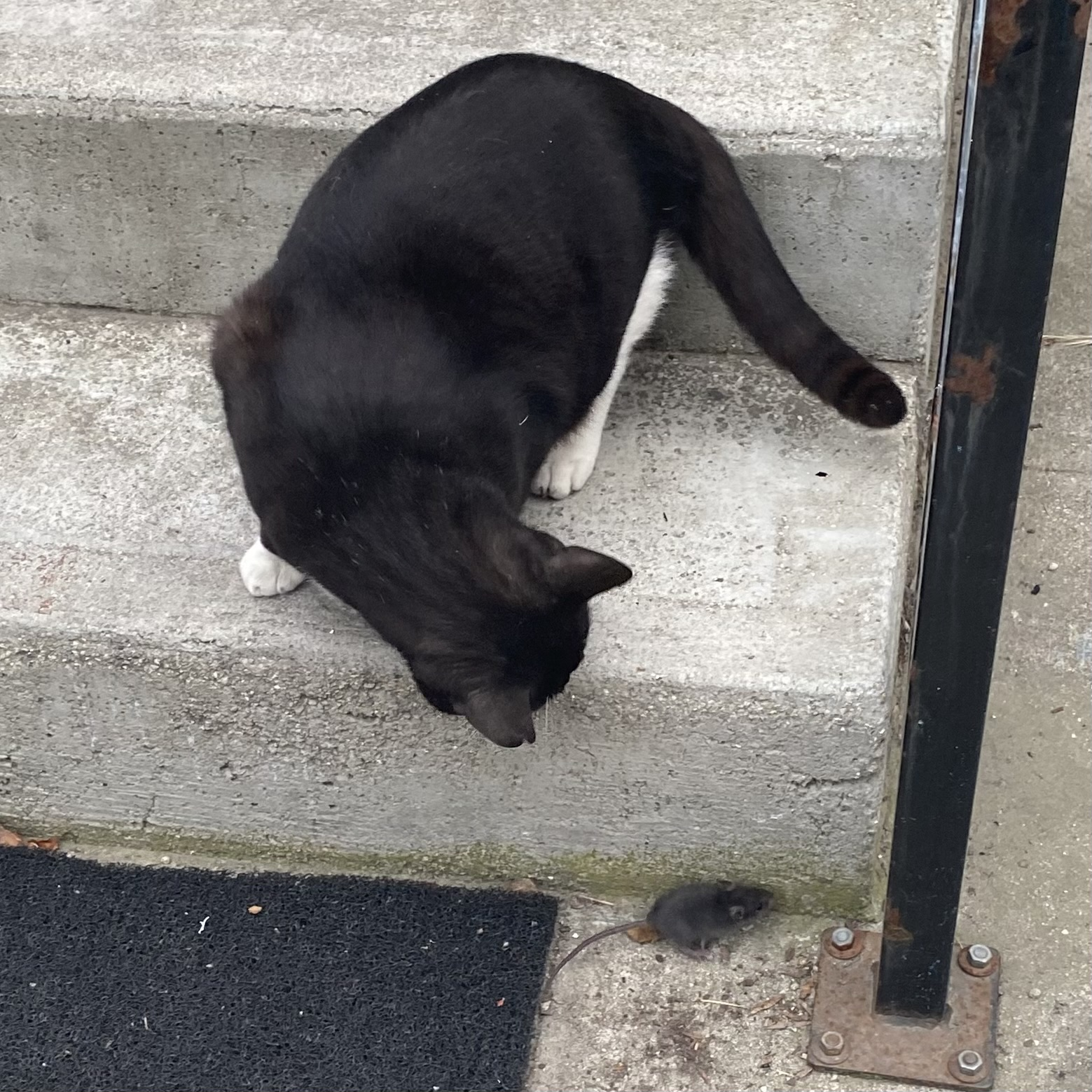
Felis catus versus Mus musculus; domestic cats often capture and release their prey multiple times before the target of the hunt stops moving for good.

Cat and mouse, often expressed as cat-and-mouse game, is an English-language idiom that means "a contrived action involving constant pursuit, near captures, and repeated escapes." The "cat" is unable to secure a definitive victory over the "mouse", who, despite not being able to defeat the cat, is able to avoid capture. In extreme cases, the idiom may imply that the contest is never-ending. The term is derived from the hunting behavior of domestic cats, which often appear to "play" with prey by releasing it after capture.

In colloquial usage, it has often been generalized to mean the advantage constantly shifts between the contestants, leading to an impasse or de facto stalemate. Furthermore, the term has been used to refer to the game hide-and-seek.

== See also ==
- Cat and Mouse (disambiguation), many items listed were named in explicit reference to the pre-existing idiom
- Arms race
- Belling the Cat
- "Cat and Mouse in Partnership", a Brothers Grimm fairytale
- Cat play and toys
- Red Queen's race, Alice constantly running but remaining in the same spot
- Tom and Jerry cartoon in which the cat Tom chases the mouse Jerry
