= Time and Light =

- Author: William Bornefeld
- Language: English
- Publication date: 1996

Time and Light is a 1996 novel written by William Bornefeld.

== Plot summary ==
Time and Light is a novel in which a dystopian police state masquerades as a utopia, in which Dr. Noreen stumbles upon 20th-century photographs that spark a personal awakening, leading him to question the tightly controlled society in which he lives. The novel includes drug enforcement, confined living spaces, sexual suppression, and a historical cataclysm that shaped the current world. The narrative charts Noreen’s intellectual journey and emotional friction with the system.

== Reception ==
Andy Butcher reviewed Time and Light for Arcane magazine, rating it a 4 out of 10 overall, and stated that "It's not that Time and Light is a bad book - it's quite well written, if a bit over-stylised, and the plot is well structured - it just isn't good enough to get away with so many clichés and stereotypes of the genre."

== Reviews ==
- Review by Don D'Ammassa (1997) in Science Fiction Chronicle, #192 June 1997
