= The Best Christmas Ever =

The Best Christmas Ever may refer to:

- The Best Christmas Ever (That '70s Show), an episode of That '70s Show
- The Best Christmas Ever (story), a 2004 short story by James Patrick Kelly
- The Best Christmas Ever!, a 1990 video album by Wee Sing
- Best Christmas Ever (program block), a program block on American cable network AMC
- Best. Christmas. Ever!, 2023 film released by Netflix
- "Best Christmas Ever" (song) by Robbie Williams
- "Best Christmas Ever" (How to Get Away with Murder) television episode
