= Harsh Mistress =

Harsh Mistress may refer to:

- "Harsh Mistress" (The Twilight Zone), an episode of the 2002 TV series The Twilight Zone
- Harsh Mistress, original title of the now defunct science fiction magazine Absolute Magnitude

== See also ==
- The Moon Is a Harsh Mistress, a 1966 science fiction novel by Robert A. Heinlein
