= Geoffrey A. Landis =

American aerospace engineer (born 1955)

Geoffrey Alan Landis
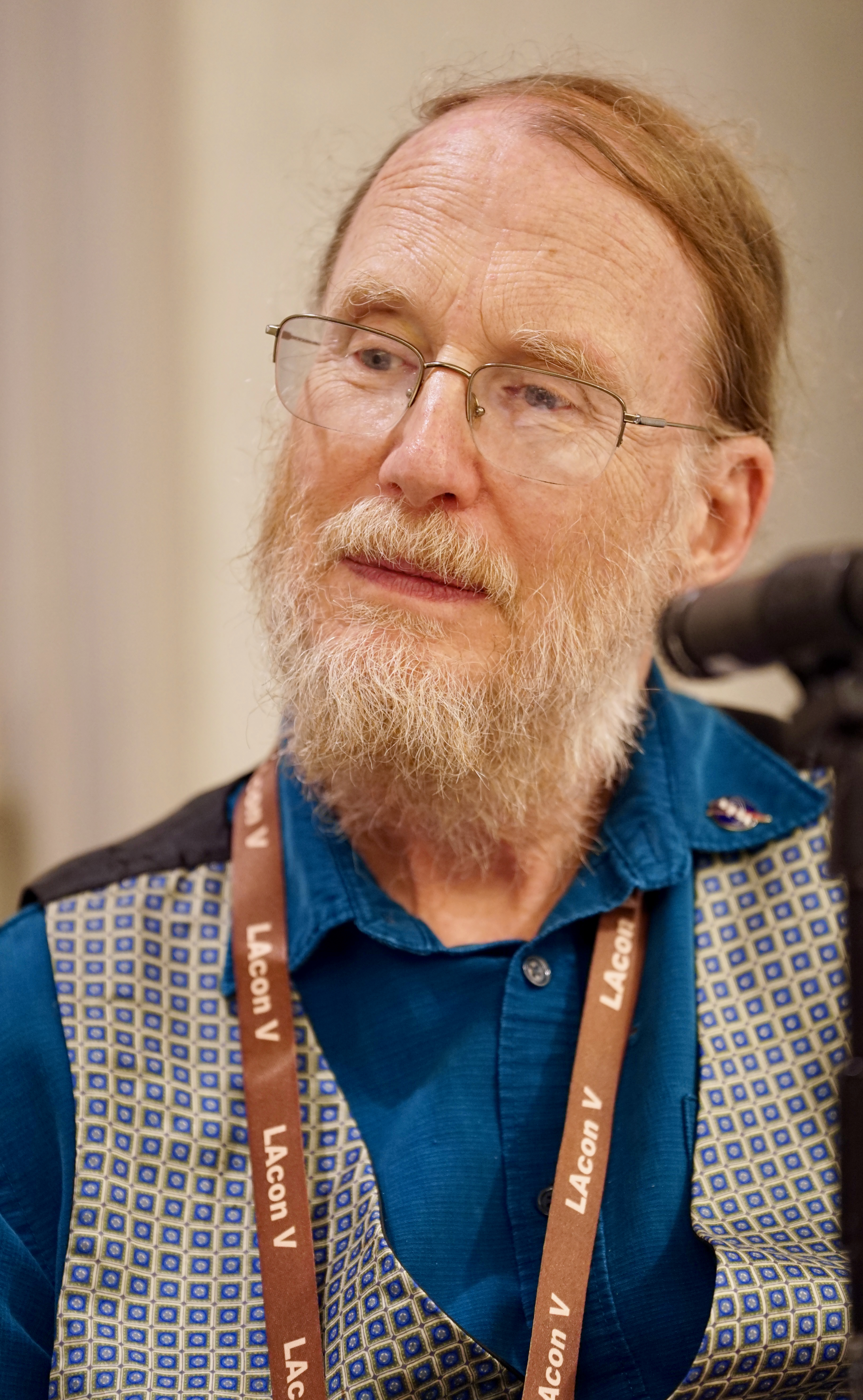
- Landis at Worldcon 2026
- Born: May 28, 1955 (age 71); Detroit, Michigan, U.S.
- Education: New Trier High School, Winnetka, Illinois; Massachusetts Institute of Technology (BS); Brown University (MS, PhD)
- Occupations: Scientist, author
- Spouse: Mary A. Turzillo
- Writing career
- Genre: Science fiction
- Notable awards: Hugo Award; Nebula Award; Locus Award; Rhysling Award
- Website: www.geoffreylandis.com

Geoffrey Alan Landis (/ˈlændɪs/; born May 28, 1955) is an American aerospace engineer and author, working for the National Aeronautics and Space Administration (NASA) on planetary exploration, interstellar propulsion, solar power and photovoltaics. He holds nine patents, primarily in the field of improvements to solar cells and photovoltaic devices and has given presentations and commentary on the possibilities for interstellar travel and construction of bases on the Moon, Mars, and Venus.

Supported by his scientific background Landis also writes hard science fiction. For these writings he has won a Nebula Award, two Hugo Awards, and a Locus Award, as well as three Rhysling Awards for his poetry. He contributes science articles to various academic publications.

== Biography ==
Landis was born in Detroit, Michigan, and lived in Virginia, Maryland, Philadelphia, and Illinois during his childhood. His senior education was at New Trier High School, Winnetka, Illinois. He holds undergraduate degrees in physics and electrical engineering from the Massachusetts Institute of Technology (MIT). He also holds masters degrees in physics and engineering and a PhD in solid-state physics from Brown University. He is married to science fiction writer Mary A. Turzillo and lives in Berea, Ohio.

== Career ==
After receiving his doctorate at Brown University, Landis worked at the NASA Lewis Research Center (now NASA Glenn) and the Ohio Aerospace Institute before accepting a permanent position at the NASA John Glenn Research Center, where he does research on Mars missions, solar energy, and technology development for future space missions. He holds nine patents, and has authored or co-authored more than 300 published scientific papers in the fields of astronautics and photovoltaics.

Landis has commented on the practicalities of generating oxygen and creating building materials for a future Moon base in New Scientist, and on the possibilities of using readily available metallic iron to manufacture steel on Mars.

He is the recipient of numerous professional honors, including the American Institute of Aeronautics and Astronautics Aerospace Power Systems Award, the NASA Space Flight Awareness award and the Rotary National Award for Space Achievement Stellar Award in 2016.

=== Photovoltaic power systems ===
Much of Landis' technical work has been in the field of developing solar cells and arrays, both for terrestrial use and for spacecraft.

=== Mars ===
Landis has worked on a number of projects related to developing technology of human and robotic exploration of Mars and scientific analysis of the Martian surface, including studies of the performance of photovoltaic cells in the Mars environment, the effect of Martian dust on performance, and technologies for dust removal from the arrays. He was a member of the Rover team on the Mars Pathfinder mission, and named the Mars rock, "Yogi". He is a member of the science team on the 2003 Mars Exploration Rovers mission, where his work includes observations of Martian dust devils, atmospheric science measurements, and observation of frost on the equator of Mars. He was also a member of the Mars ISPP Propellant Precursor experiment team for the Mars Surveyor 2001 Lander mission, an experiment package to demonstrate manufacture of oxygen from the Martian atmosphere (which was cancelled after the failure of the Mars Polar Lander).

He has also done work on analyzing concepts for future robotic and human mission to Mars. These include the Mars Geyser Hopper spacecraft, a Discovery-class mission concept that would investigate the springtime carbon dioxide Martian geysers found in regions around the south pole of Mars, the Human Exploration using Real-time Robotic Operations ("HERRO") concept for telerobotic Mars exploration, and concepts for use of In-situ resource use for a Mars sample-return mission. In a 1993 paper, he suggested the use of a phased program of Mars exploration, with a series of incremental achievements leading up to human landings on Mars.

=== NASA Institute for Advanced Concepts ===
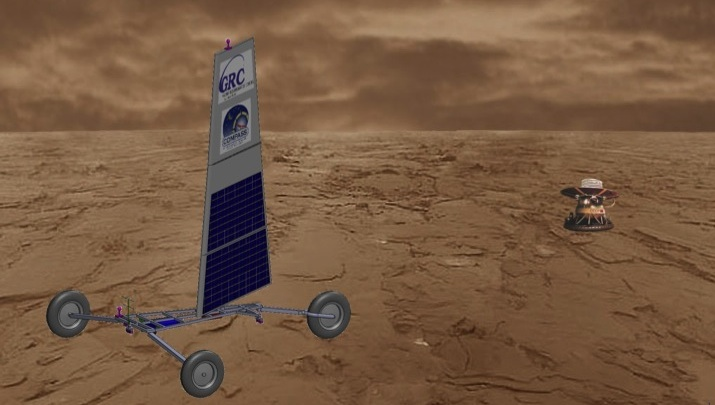
The Zephyr landsailing rover, a concept for a wind-propelled rover on the surface of Venus. Image from NASA John Glenn Research Center, for the NASA Innovative Advanced Concepts ("NIAC") project.

Landis was a fellow of the NASA Institute for Advanced Concepts ("NIAC"), where he worked on a project investigating the use of laser- and particle-beam pushed sails for propulsion for interstellar flight. In 2002 Landis addressed the annual convention of the American Association for the Advancement of Science on the possibilities and challenges of interstellar travel in what was described as the "first serious discussion of how mankind will one day set sail to the nearest star". Dr. Landis said, "This is the first meeting to really consider interstellar travel by humans. It is historic. We're going to the stars. There really isn't a choice in the long term." He went on to describe a star ship with a diamond sail, a few nanometres thick, powered by solar energy, which could achieve "10 per cent of the speed of light".

He was selected again as a NASA Innovative Advanced Concepts fellow in 2012, with feasibility concept of a landsailing rover for Venus exploration, called Venus Landsailing Rover, in 2015 was the science lead on a NIAC study to design a mission to Neptune's moon Triton. In 2024, he was selected the principle investigator for another NIAC project to explore Venus, "Venus Sample Return Using In-situ Propellant", which proposed using an aircraft to fetch a sample from the Venus surface, taking it to a balloon station in the upper atmosphere, which will produce chemical propellant to ruel a rocket launch the sample into orbit.

In 2017, Landis's work was the subject of the book Land-Sailing Venus Rover With NASA Inventor Geoffrey Landis, published by World Book as part of their "Out of This World" book series for ages 10–14+.

=== Academic positions ===
In 2005–2006, he was named the Ronald E. McNair Visiting Professor of Astronautics at MIT, and won the AIAA Abe M. Zarem Educator Award in 2007. Landis has also been a faculty member of the International Space University; in 1998 he was on the faculty of the Department of Mining, Manufacturing, and Robotics in the Space Studies Program, and in 1999 he was on the faculty of the 12th Space Studies Program at the Suranaree University of Technology in Nakhon Ratchasima, Thailand. and co-chair of the student project "Out of the Cradle". He was also a guest lecturer at the ISU 13th Space Studies Program in Valparaíso, Chile, and the 2015 Space Studies Program in Athens, Ohio.

As a writer he was an instructor at the Clarion Writers Workshop at Michigan State University in 2001. He was a guest instructor at the Launch Pad workshop for 2012.

== Writing ==
=== Science fiction ===
Landis' first science fiction story, "Elemental", appeared in Analog in December 1984, and was nominated for the 1985 Hugo Award for Best Novella. as well as earning him a nomination for the John W. Campbell Award for Best New Writer. In the field of science fiction, Landis has published over 70 works of short fiction, and two books. He won the 1989 Nebula Award for best short story for "Ripples in the Dirac Sea" (Asimov's Science Fiction, October 1988), the 1992 Hugo Award for "A Walk in the Sun" (Asimov's Science Fiction, October 1991), and the 2003 Hugo for his short story "Falling onto Mars" (Analog Science Fiction and Fact, July/Aug 2002).

His first novel, Mars Crossing, was published by Tor Books in 2000, winning a Locus Award. A short story collection, Impact Parameter (and Other Quantum Realities), was published by Golden Gryphon Press in 2001 and named as noteworthy by trade magazine Publishers Weekly. He has also won the Analog Analytical Laboratory Award for the novelette The Man in the Mirror (2009). His 2010 novella The Sultan of the Clouds won the Theodore Sturgeon Award for best short science fiction story, and was nominated for both the Nebula and Hugo awards.

Geoffrey Landis combined his scientific insights about Venus cloud layer habitability in his science fiction work The Sultan of the Clouds (2010).

He attended the Clarion Workshop in 1985, with other emerging SF writers such as Kristine Kathryn Rusch, Martha Soukup, William Shunn, Resa Nelson, Mary Turzillo and Robert J. Howe.

=== Poetry ===
Landis has also published a number of poems, much of it involving science fiction or science themes. He won the Rhysling Award three times, for his poems "Christmas, after we all get time machines" in 2000 (which also won the 2000 Asimov's Reader's Award for best poem), for "Search" in 2009, and for "No One Now Remembers" in 2024. He won the Dwarf Stars Award in 2009, for the poem "Fireflies". He has won the Asimov's Reader's award for best poem three times, most recently in 2014, for his poem "Rivers". In 2009, he won second place in the Hessler Street Fair poetry contest for his poem "Five Pounds of Sunlight", and first place in 2010 for "Human Potential".

His poetry collection Iron Angels was published in 2009.

=== Other writing ===
Landis has also written non-fiction and popular science articles, encyclopedia articles and columns for a large range of publications, including Analog Science Fiction and Fact, Space Sciences, Asimov's Science Fiction, Spaceflight, and Science Fiction Age. His article "The Demon Under Hawaii" won the Analog Analytical Laboratory Award for best science article in 1993.

Writing influences include Arthur C. Clarke, Isaac Asimov, Robert A. Heinlein, Ursula K. Le Guin, Kurt Vonnegut, Larry Niven, and John Varley.

== Major awards ==
- 1989 Nebula Award for Best Short Story for "Ripples in the Dirac Sea"
- 1992 Hugo Award for Best Short Story for "A Walk in the Sun"
- 2001 Locus Award for Best First Novel for Mars Crossing
- 2003 Hugo Award for Best Short Story for "Falling onto Mars"
- 2011 Theodore Sturgeon Award for best short science fiction for "The Sultan of the Clouds"
- 2014 Robert A. Heinlein Award "bestowed for outstanding published works in science fiction and technical writings that inspire the human exploration of space".

== Bibliography ==
=== Novels ===
- Landis, Geoffrey A. (2000). Mars crossing. Tor Books.

=== Short fiction ===
Collections

- Landis, Geoffrey A. (2001). Impact Parameter (and Other Quantum Realities). Urbana, Ill.: Golden Gryphon Press.

Stories (Note: Short stories unless otherwise noted.)

- "Ripples in the Dirac Sea"
- "A Walk in the Sun" (1991, in Asimov's Science Fiction, also released as an audio recording, 2004)
- "Falling onto Mars"
- "The Man in the Mirror" 2009
- "The Sultan of the Clouds" 2010
- "A Hotel in Antarctica" 2014 (Note: Tom Jackson, "Cleveland sci-fi author Geoffrey Landis appears in big new anthology", Sandusky Register, November 26, 2014 (accessed June 14, 2015))
- "Impact Parameter"
- "Elemental"
- "Ecopoiesis"
- "Across the Darkness"
- "Ouroboros"
- "Into the Blue Abyss"
- "Snow"
- "Rorvik's War"
- "Approaching Perimelasma"
- "What We Do Here at NASA"
- "Dark Lady"
- "Outsider's Chance"
- "Beneath the Stars of Winter"
- "The Singular Habits of Wasps"
- "Winter Fire"
- "A Quiet Evening by Gaslight" (collected in Mike Resnick's 1994 alternate history anthology Alternate Outlaws)

=== Poetry ===
Collections

- Landis, Geoffrey A. (2009). Iron Angels. Van Zeno Press. ISBN 978-0-9789244-7-8. Archived from the original on July 17, 2011.

List of poems

- "On the semileptonic decay of mesons". Asimov's Science Fiction. 37 (4&5): 107. April–May 2013.
- "Rivers". Asimov's Science Fiction. 37 (6): 31. June 2013.
- "Everything decays". Asimov's Science Fiction. 38 (3): 106. March 2014.
- "Both suns at high noon". Asimov's Science Fiction. 38 (7): 47. July 2014.
- "Scifaiku". Asimov's Science Fiction. 38 (8): 69. August 2014.
- "Fibonacci's rabbits". Asimov's Science Fiction. 38 (12): 45. December 2014.
- "Love & the Moon". Asimov's Science Fiction. 39 (6): 69. June 2015.

=== Non-fiction ===
- Landis, Geoffrey A. (1991). Myths, legends, and true history. Author's Choice Monthly. Vol. 26. Eugene, OR: Pulphouse Publications. OCLC 25242854.
- Geoffrey A. Landis. Laser-powered Interstellar Probe on the Geoffrey A. Landis: Science. papers available on the web

Bibliography notes
