= Ripples in the Dirac Sea =

1988 short story by Geoffrey A. Landis

"Ripples in the Dirac Sea" is a science fiction short story by American writer Geoffrey Landis. It was first published in Asimov's Science Fiction in October 1988.

== Synopsis ==
The inventor of time travel cannot escape dying in a hotel fire, no matter how many millions of times he tries or how many lives he lives between the nanoseconds.

== Reception ==
"Ripples in the Dirac Sea" won the Nebula Award for Best Short Story of 1988, and was a finalist for the 1989 Hugo Award for Best Short Story. In the Washington Post, Tim Sullivan called it "excellent", similarly, at Strange Horizons, Paul Kincaid declared that its presence in an anthology was "a harbinger of the very good things to come".
