= From Babel's Fall'n Glory We Fled =

- Short story by Michael Swanwick
- Language: English
- Genre(s): Science fiction

Publication
- Published in: Isaac Asimov's Science Fiction Magazine
- Publication type: Magazine
- Publication date: February 2008

"From Babel's Fall'n Glory We Fled" is a science fiction short story by American writer Michael Swanwick, originally published in the February 2008 issue of the Isaac Asimov's Science Fiction Magazine. It was nominated for the 2009 Hugo Award for Best Short Story.

== Plot summary ==
The story is about a human and a millipede-like alien who flee the destruction of a magnificent alien city.

"Imagine a cross between Byzantium and a termite mound. Imagine a jeweled mountain, slender as an icicle, rising out of the steam jungles and disappearing into the dazzling pearl-grey skies of Gehenna. Imagine that Gaudi—he of the Sagrada Familia and other biomorphic architectural whimsies—had been commissioned by a nightmare race of giant black millipedes to recreate Barcelona at the height of its glory, along with touches of the Forbidden City in the eighteenth century and Tokyo in the twenty-second, all within a single miles-high structure. Hold every bit of that in your mind at once, multiply by a thousand, and you’ve got only the faintest ghost of a notion of the splendor that was Babel."

== Author's comments ==
Swanwick has written that the story began as an outline and novel proposal that he was unable to complete. Regarding this story, he wrote: "FBF'nGWF... is all that remains of what was originally going to be a novel. I put a lot of ideation into making notes, creating a stellar system, a way of moving humans into it, a version of information economics that went way beyond the predatory, an alien society, a human society... and then one day realized that it had been two years and I still didn't have any characters or a plot. So I got to work on a different novel.

A working writer abhors waste, however, so I took as many of my ideas as I could and put them into this story. Someday, I may write another story showing how the humans got to Gehenna in the first place."

Swanwick devised a novel language for the aliens, based on Asian (Chinese?) languages: "...take a look at the cluster of alien “speech” above [at cite]. The millies have trilateral symmetry and a signed language, so that a single thought or statement transcribed into what I think of as an ergoglyph looks something like a verbal snowflake.

You have no idea how much fun that was to write."
