= Warren Lapine =

- Born: June 2, 1964 (age 61)
- Other names: Jamie Wild
- Occupations: Writer; publisher; musician
- Known for: Publishing

Warren Lapine (born 2 June 1964) is a speculative fiction writer and publisher.

== Publishing career ==
Lapine is best known for his publishing business, particularly with his first company, DNA Publications, which published a range of magazines including Harsh Mistress, Absolute Magnitude, Dreams of Decadence, Fantastic Stories, Aboriginal SF, Mythic Delirium, The Official KISS Magazine, Science Fiction Chronicle and Weird Tales, from 1993 to 2007. As of 2004 the company was the second-largest genre-magazine publisher in the US. Lapine was a 2000 World Fantasy Award nominee for DNA Publications, and a 2002 Hugo Award nominee for Absolute Magnitude in the semi-prozine category. He was also nominated for a Chesley Award for Best Art Director in 2008. However, DNA publications failed suddenly in 2007, collapsing due to market changes that led to unfulfilled subscriptions and business debts.

Lapine also operates a book program focusing on public domain releases, Wilder Publications, which continues to publish after the collapse of DNA Publications. Because of the dated nature of some of these books, Wilder included a caveat warning parents about discussing societal changes with their children before allowing them to read classic books like The Adventures of Huckleberry Finn. However, including this caveat on the company's copy of the US Constitution led to a controversy in 2010.

In 2009 Lapine founded Tir Na Nog Press along with a science fiction / fantasy imprint, Fantastic Books, with freelance editing by Douglas Cohen, Marty Halpern, Ian Randal Strock, Darrell Schweitzer and David Truesdale. Ian Randal Strock was then hired full-time as publisher of Fantastic Books. After announcing the re-launch of Fantastic Stories, Lapine decided to purchase Realms of Fantasy, instead. With Realms of Fantasy relaunched under new management, plans were underway to put out Dreams of Decadence. However, in September 2010, Realms of Fantasy was sold to Damnation Books; in November 2010 Fantastic Books was sold to Ian Randal Strock, and all Dreams of Decadence subscriptions were rolled into Realms of Fantasy.

In 2014 Lapine announced the inception of the web-zine Fantastic Stories of the Imagination as a new venture, which was preceded by two anthologies.

== Writing career ==
Lapine has published a number of short stories, poems and essays and sometimes uses the pseudonym Jamie Wild. In 2006 he published the collection Just Like the Jetsons.

== Music career ==
Prior to his publishing career, Lapine spent about 10 years working as a bass player and vocalist in heavy metal bands including Fallen Angel, Wildblade, and Hired Guns. His last professional music gig was at age 27. Afterward, Lapine partnered with KISS Ltd. to publish KISS the Official Authorized Quarterly Magazine for three years. He later published the KISS Interviews.

== Personal life ==
Lapine married SF writer Angela Kessler, whom he met at a science fiction convention in Lynchburg, Virginia. According to Kessler, she was distracted by Lapine's appearance and walked into a potted palm, which then attracted his attention.
