= The Only Harmless Great Thing =

Short story by Brooke Bolander

- Author: Brooke Bolander
- Language: English
- Genre: Alternate history
- Publisher: Tom Doherty Associates
- Publication date: January 23, 2018
- Publication place: United States
- Media type: Print (paperback), ebook
- Pages: 95 pp.
- Award: Nebula—Novelette (2018); Locus—Novelette (2019)
- ISBN: 9781250169488 (1st ed. paperback); 9781250169471 (ebook)
- OCLC: 986960168
- LC Class: PS3602.O6515 O55 2018

The Only Harmless Great Thing is a 2018 alternate history story by Brooke Bolander, exploring the conjunction of Topsy the Elephant and the Radium Girls scandal. It was published by Tor.com.

The title is taken from John Donne's 1612 poem The Progress of the Soul, and is his description of an elephant.

== Synopsis ==
In a world where sign language communication with elephants became possible in the 1880s, but they were still considered animals for several decades more, US Radium has purchased several (including Topsy) to replace their litigious human employees, because elephants can tolerate higher doses of radiation. Decades in the future, a scientist tries to persuade the elephant community to allow themselves to become long-term nuclear waste warning messages.

== Origins ==
Bolander has described the story as the result of having read a Twitter poll in which Helena Bell asked which of several options she should write about next; two of the options were "elephants" and "radium poisoning".

== Release ==
The story, which is approximately 90 to 100 pages, was first released in the US as first edition by Tom Doherty Associates as a Tor.com Book. A paperback and ebook were published in Jan 2018, and it was edited by Marco Paliermi. Will Staehle provided cover design work to these.

== Reception ==
Kirkus Reviews found it to be "rich (and) poetic", and observed that its "commentary around workers' rights, animal rights, and women’s rights" produces "a work grounded in injustice and outrage" which "never feels preachy", but also noted that Bolander's "gorgeous and vigorous" prose can hinder readability, as can the "frequent scene shifts". Publishers Weekly considered it to be "disjointed" and "hard to follow", with little "plot or (...) emotional hook", but nonetheless stated that Bolander's "lyrical writing is pleasant".

== Awards ==
Year	Award	Category	Result	Ref.
2018	Nebula Award	Novelette	Won	
2019	British Fantasy Award	Novella	Shortlisted	
2019	Hugo Award	Novelette	Shortlisted	
2019	Locus Award	Novelette	Won	
2019	Shirley Jackson Award	Novella	Shortlisted	
2019	Theodore Sturgeon Award	—	Shortlisted	
2019	World Fantasy Award	Novella	Shortlisted	
