= Falling onto Mars =

Short story by Geoffrey A. Landis

- Short story by Geoffrey A. Landis
- Country: United States
- Language: English
- Genre(s): Science fiction

Publication
- Published in: Analog Science Fiction and Fact
- Publication type: Periodical
- Media type: Print (Magazine)
- Publication date: July/August 2002

"Falling onto Mars" is a science fiction short story by Geoffrey A. Landis, published in 2002. It won the 2003 Hugo Award for Best Short Story.

== Plot summary ==
The story is told from the point of view of a great-great-grandchild of a prisoner exiled to Mars. The narrator gives a brief history of how prisoners came to be sent to Mars in the first place, and then tells the story of Jared Vargas and his wife Kayla.
