= The Tale of the Three Beautiful Raptor Sisters, and the Prince Who Was Made of Meat =

- Short story by Brooke Bolander
- Language: English
- Genre(s): Fairy tale

Publication
- Published in: Uncanny Magazine
- Media type: Print, audio

Chronology
| The Only Harmless Great Thing | No Flight Without the Shatter |

"The Tale of the Three Beautiful Raptor Sisters, and the Prince Who Was Made of Meat" is a fantasy story by Brooke Bolander. It was first published in Uncanny Magazine, in 2018.

== Synopsis ==
In a fairy tale setting, three dromeosaurid sisters, Allie, Betty, and Ceecee, live happily together in a forest. One day a particularly foolish Prince rode into their forest, as he had ignored all of the signs located outside of the forest warning not to enter. He is surprised when he sees the three sisters, as he believed the warnings indicated bandits or wolves, but shows no response to Ceecee eating his horse. This lack of a response cause the sisters to worry that the humans are plotting against them. They also choose not to eat the Prince, as they view his stupidity as something that might make them sick.

After some debate, Ceecee decides to travel to the Prince's castle in order to investigate, something she must do alone, or it would raise suspicions. She reluctantly allows the Prince to use her as a mount, as this would allow her to enter the castle freely. Upon their arrival the castle denizens ignore Ceecee's presence in order to grieve the horse's death, save for the Princess, who leads Ceecee to the royal stables to rest. Once there, the Princess reveals that she is a witch capable of conversing with various species, surprising Ceecee. Days pass, during which Ceecee's hatred for the Prince grows due to his lack of care and repeated use of her as a mount. Her only bright spot is the Princess, who confides that she was forced to become the Prince's fiancée and that she would much rather live alone in a forest.

One night a new person brings Ceecee her evening meal, which has been drugged. While she is asleep the Prince has people muzzle Ceecee and place iron shackles on her, so that he can force her to become his permanent mount. This horrifies the Princess and later that night she sneaks into Ceecee's stall in order to apologize, as she was unaware of the prince's intent. She also informs Ceecee that her sisters are coming and that she will become their ally, so they can sneak into the castle. The Princess uses her magic to sneak the sisters into the castle and together, they free Ceecee. The three sisters return to the forest along with the Princess, who they allow to live in their forest as a reward for her assistance. The four live happily in the forest together, leaving only to hunt down and kill the Prince.

== Publication history ==
"The Tale of the Three Beautiful Raptor Sisters, and the Prince Who Was Made of Meat" was first published in print in the July–August 2018 issue of Uncanny Magazine. The story was also read in the magazine's podcast, Uncanny Podcast, on August 7, 2018, where it was read by Stephanie Malia Morris.

== Reception ==
"The Tale of the Three Beautiful Raptor Sisters, and the Prince Who Was Made of Meat" was a finalist for the 2019 Hugo Award for Best Short Story.

Tangent Online found it to be "very light comedy, which provides a moderate amount of amusement", calling it "a featherweight story" and "quite lengthy". Meg Elison stated that it was "exactly what's on the can", but emphasized that it was also "both darker and funnier than you expect". Locus praised it as "delightfully darkish". Lela E. Buis also reviewed the short story, praising the tone and narrative, while also criticizing that the story felt "long and is easy to predict."
