= They've Been Working On... =

Science-fiction short story by Anton Lee Baker

"They've Been Working On..." is a science fiction short story by Anton Lee Baker. It was first published in Astounding Science Fiction, in August 1958.

== Synopsis ==
A computer tries to solve problems involving misconfigured railroad cars, but its attempts only make things worse.

== Reception ==
"They've Been Working On..." was a finalist for the 1959 Hugo Award for Best Short Story.

Cat Rambo has cited it as an example of "why titles matter".
