= Asymmetric Warfare (short story) =

2015 science fiction short story by S.R. Algernon

Asymmetrical warfare is a 2015 science fiction short story written by S.R. Algernon and published in Nature. It was a finalist for the 2015 Hugo Award for Best Short Story.

== Synopsis ==
The story is written as a military log of aliens invading earth. The aliens are trying to prove that earthlings have enough battle prowess to be inducted into the "Galactic Union." However, when it is revealed that the main earthling species are humans and not a regenerating star-shaped race, complications arise.
