= SFScope =

- Available in: English
- Owner: Ian Randal Strock
- Website: http://sfscope.com/
- Launched: 2007
- Current status: Inactive

SFScope is an online trade journal devoted to entertainment news concerning speculative fiction, science fiction, fantasy, and horror. It was founded by Ian Randal Strock in early 2007.

Strock began his career as the editorial assistant of the magazines Analog Science Fiction and Fact and Asimov's Science Fiction. He founded SFScope in early 2007 to "deliver the news of the speculative fiction fields in a timely, accessible fashion." While he is the site's publisher and primary editor, writers Kit Hawkins, Michael A. Burstein, and Sarah Stegall also contribute columns.

Strock has stated, "We shy away from the constant rumor updates about coming movies. There are so many other sites already covering that aspect of the field."

== Hiatus ==
The last legitimate post to this site is dated 7 July 2014, titled ‘Sorry for the Silence’ by Ian Randal Strock.

As of 24 August 2019, the main page of the site has been hijacked by spammers and publishes a steady stream of dating sites and so forth.
