= Zephyr (rover) =

Robotic Venus rover concept

Zephyr (Venus Landsailing Rover mission)
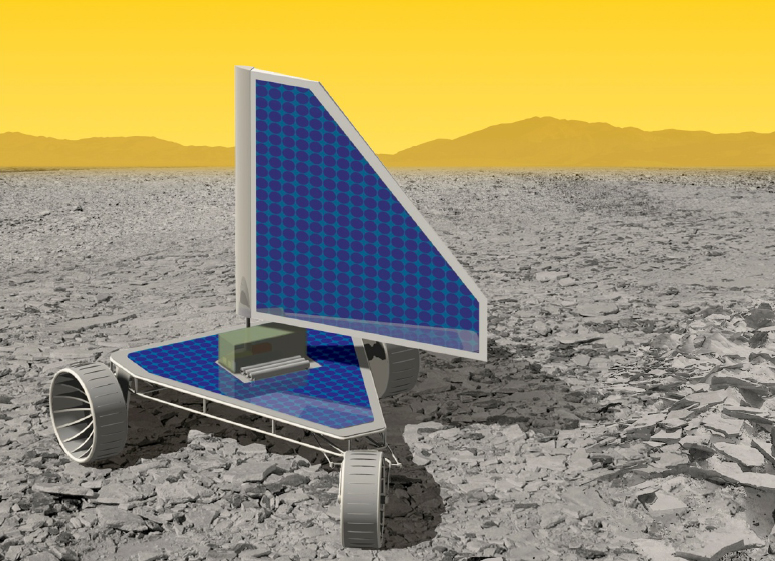
- Artist's concept of the Zephyr rover
- Mission type: Reconnaissance
- Operator: NASA's Glenn Research Center
- Mission duration: 50 Earth days

Spacecraft properties
- Spacecraft: Zephyr
- Spacecraft type: Wingsail rover
- Manufacturer: Glenn Research Center
- Launch mass: 1,581 kg (3,486 lb)
- Landing mass: 220–265 kg (485–584 lb)
- Payload mass: 23 kg (51 lb)
- Power: ≥ 98.4 watts

Start of mission
- Launch date: 2039 (proposed)

Venus rover

Zephyr is a concept of a robotic Venus rover for a mission called Venus Landsailing Rover. This mission concept would place a rover on the surface of Venus that would be propelled by the force of the wind. The rover would be launched together with a Venus orbiter that would be a communications relay and perform remote atmospheric studies.

The rover would be designed to operate on the surface of Venus for 50 Earth days, and navigate sandy plains bathed in heat and dense sulfuric acid clouds under very high atmospheric pressure. The rover can move in any direction, regardless of wind direction. Zephyr would sail up to 15 minutes per day to reach its next target, where it would park using a combination of brakes and feathering the wingsail while it performs its science activities. The rover would carry a science payload of 23 kg (51 lb), including a robotic arm. The overall mission architecture aims to achieve telerobotic capability, with a 4-minute delay in radio communication.

The principal investigator is Geoffrey Landis of NASA's Glenn Research Center in Cleveland, Ohio. When the most critical hardware becomes available and is tested, Landis intends to propose the mission to NASA's Discovery program to compete for funding and a launch intended for 2039.

== Rover overview ==
Zephyr	Specifications
Aeroshell	Diameter: 3.10 m (10.2 ft)
Launch mass	1,581 kg (3,486 lb)
Rover mass	≤ 265 kg (584 lb)
Rover dimensions	Length: 4.62 m (15.2 ft); Width: 5.54 m (18.2 ft)
Wingsail	Height: 5.44 m (17.8 ft); Length: 3.10 m (10.2 ft); Area: 12 m^{2} (130 sq ft)
Wheels (x3)	Diameter: 1 m (3 ft 3 in); Width: 22.9 cm (9.0 in)
Ground clearance	0.9 m (2 ft 11 in)
Science payload mass	23 kg (51 lb)
Radio band	UHF
Cooling systems	None

Since 2012, scientist Geoffrey A. Landis has been working on a mission concept for a Venus rover propelled by a rigid wingsail, inspired on the landsailing vehicles. The vehicle has only two moving parts: the sail, and the steering front wheel. The mission concept is named Venus Landsailing Rover, and the rover is called Zephyr, after the Greek god of the west wind, Zephyrus.

For simplicity, the rover's wingsail is actually rigid, like a vertical wing with solar cells on its surface. Although some technology development is needed to bring the high-temperature electronics to operational readiness, the study showed that such a mobility approach is feasible, and no major difficulties are seen.

The aimed rover's design lifetime is 50 days. Given the extreme environmental conditions at the surface of Venus, all previous landers and atmospheric probes operated for a few hours at most, so the Glenn Research Center team plans to use materials and electronics developed to withstand not just the extreme pressure, corrosive atmosphere and heat, but also operate with minimum solar power and without a cooling system, which reduces the landing mass significantly. The temperature at the surface is 740 K (467 °C, 872 °F), and the pressure is 93 bar (9.3 MPa), roughly the pressure found 900 m (3,000 ft) underwater on Earth. For the purposes of propulsion, surface wind velocities of at least 0.4 m/s (1.3 ft/s) and up to 1.3 m/s (4.3 ft/s) are assumed. Zephyr would sail up to 15 minutes per day to reach its next target. From the images acquired by the Russian Venera probes, the surface of Venus can be seen to have landscapes of flat, even terrain stretching to the horizon, with rocks at only centimeter scale at their locations, making it possible for landsailing. The largest expected surface irregularities are about 10.0 cm (3.9 in) in height. The vehicle uses three metallic wheels with cleats, each with a diameter of 1.0 m (3 ft 3 in) and 22.9 cm (9.0 in) wide.

Funding from the NASA Innovative Advanced Concepts (NIAC) program, is allowing research into developing the needed "Venus-hardened" systems. Actually, Glenn technologists have pioneered sensors that work inside jet engines. Those electronics can function even at the sweltering Venus temperature of 450 °C (842 °F). NASA may also provide some of this equipment to the future Russian Venera-D mission to Venus by providing a long-lived (24 hours) experimental surface station fit on the Russian lander.

In 2017, Landis's work was the subject of the book Land-Sailing Venus Rover With NASA Inventor Geoffrey Landis, published by World Book publishing.

== Electric power ==
Previous Venus landers have relied on batteries for electric power, which limits operation to a few hours at most, relying on thermal mass to delay the death of the system due to overheating. The power system for this mission uses sodium–sulfur batteries (NaS) that are re-charged by solar arrays and can function under Venus surface conditions without the need for heavy cooling systems.

The wingsail and upper deck would be covered with solar panels made of indium gallium phosphide (InGaP, also called GaInP2) because it has been well characterized for use in solar cells, it has a wide enough band gap that it can work at Venus temperature, and responds to light in the band of about 360 to 660 nm.

Although the thick cloud layer limits sunlight reaching the surface, there is enough light to use solar panels for low-power demand systems. The power required is 98.4 watts for science operations, 68.4 watts during traverse, 25.3 watts during quiescent operations such as housekeeping, and 49.3 watts during communications sessions.

== Wind force ==
While the wind speed at the surface of Venus is 1 m/s (3 ft/s), at Venus pressure and density (65 kg/m^{3}), even low wind speeds develop significant force.

=== Wingsail ===
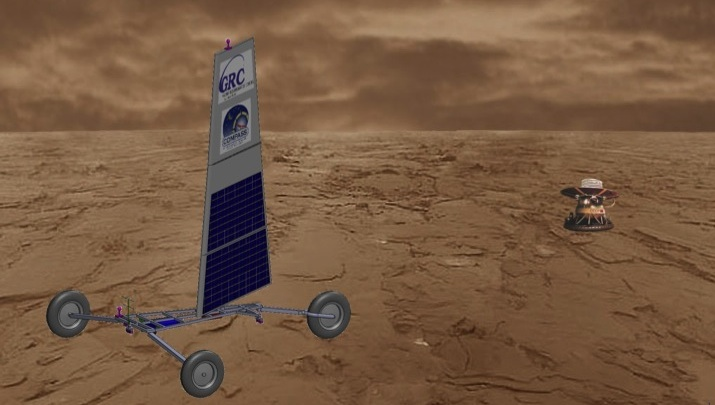
Artist's concept of the Zephyr rover, 5.5 m wide and 6.6 m tall

The propulsion concept is a rigid wingsail, mounted perpendicular to the base that can rotate via an electric motor about its mean aerodynamic center to produce a lift (thrust) vector at any orientation, depending on the direction of the wind. The wing also provides a more stable surface on which to mount the solar cells used to power instruments on the rover. A symmetric flat airfoil is much easier to control at the sacrifice of a small amount of lift. Construction of the wing is standard spar, rib, and skin, using materials appropriate for the corrosive high temperature environment.

At 5.5 m (18 ft) wide, the rover is stable on the surface, and the NASA GRC Team estimates that in order to prevent a roll-over caused by wind gusts, the system will incorporate sensors so that a sustained wind gust of 2.39 m/s (7.8 ft/s) or more will be recognized by its meteorology suite, and would give enough time to slack the sail by rotating it to a zero-lift position parallel to the wind.

The diameter of the aeroshell sets the length of the wingsail to 3.10 m (10.2 ft), its area at 12 m^{2} (130 sq ft) and a height of 5.44 m (17.8 ft) above the ground. For launch, the wingsail is folded into three sections for storage in the aeroshell, and it is deployed after the parachute descent and landing on its three wheels.

== Science payload ==
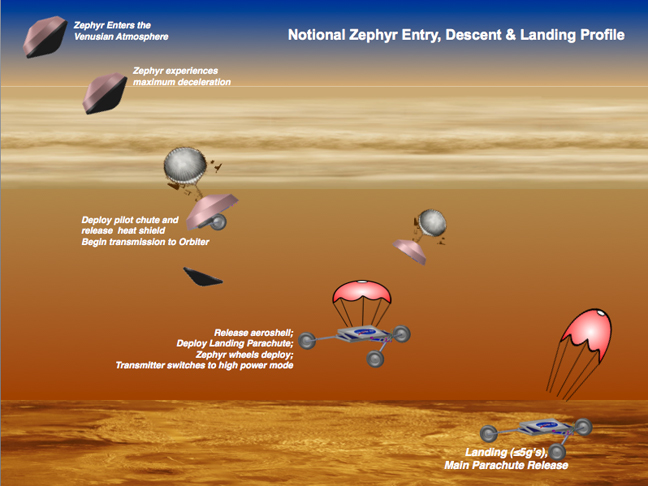
Diagram of the descent and landing sequence of Zephyr rover

The eyes of the rover would be a mechanically-scanned camera similar to the one used by the Venera 9 lander, that would operate without cooling at Venus temperature, 450 °C (842 °F), and under Venus illumination conditions and spectrum. The design would use a linear photodiode array as the light-sensing element, and except for the focal plane photodiode array, the camera is fabricated with silicon carbide electronics.

Beside the imaging cameras, the rover would carry approximately 23 kg (51 lb) of science instruments, including a robotic arm based on the Mars Phoenix's robotic arm, but simplified to a two-joint arm to minimize complexity. This arm would hold several science instruments. The notional science payload includes:

- The atmospheric science package: an anemometer (wind speed and direction), a thermometer, and a barometer (pressure sensor).
- In-situ mineralogy: These instruments would be fitted to the end of the robotic arm to make contact with the rocks and regolith and determine composition and mineralogy. These instruments include a rock abrasion grinder, alpha particle X-ray spectrometer (APXS) or an Energy-dispersive X-ray spectroscope (EDAX) for composition, and X-ray diffraction for mineralogy.

In addition to the surface science instruments, the mission may also have science packages that operate during descent, and may also deploy stationary science instruments, such as a seismometer, that are not carried on the rover. All data would be transmitted to the orbiter with a high-temperature radio, so that the whole system has no cooled parts.

== Orbiter ==
Because of the thick Venus atmosphere, radio signals from the rover would be limited in power and reach, so a relay orbiter needs to be incorporated in the mission architecture. After Zephyr separation, the orbiter would propulsively brake into a highly eccentric orbit around the planet. This orbit would have a 24 hour period, permitting communication with Zephyr for 12 to 18 hours during each orbit.

When Venus is at its closest to Earth, the communications time-lag from Venus and Earth is approximately four minutes, which is too long to control from Earth in real time, so the rover would be parked most of the time performing observations with the sail slack, while the ground controllers examine the terrain and decide the next target.

If selected for funding, the relay orbiter could also host some science instruments.
