= Myrrha (short story) =

Fantasy short story by Gary Jennings

"Myrrha" is a fantasy short story by Gary Jennings. It was first published in The Magazine of Fantasy and Science Fiction, in September 1962.

== Synopsis ==
As Shirley Spencer lies catatonic, entries from her diary describe how a visit by an old school friend from Greece gradually destroyed her life — and indicate parallels with classical mythology.

== Reception ==
"Myrrha" was a finalist for the 1963 Hugo Award for Short Fiction.

At Galactic Journey, Gideon Marcus found it to be "dreamy, humorless, (and) unpleasant", while conceding that he "might have liked it more had (he) understood it." Piers Anthony considered it "an utterly savage story of revenge for a personal slight."
