= Mr. Jester =

1966 short story by Fred Saberhagen

"Mr. Jester" is a science fiction short story by American writer Fred Saberhagen. It was first published in If, in 1966.

== Plot summary ==
After a society without humor exiles their only comedian to the outskirts of the Solar System, he becomes the only one who can save them from being destroyed by a Berserker.

== Reception ==
"Mr. Jester" was a finalist for the 1967 Hugo Award for Best Short Story. Galactic Journey noted thematic parallels with Harlan Ellison's "'Repent, Harlequin!' Said the Ticktockman", which had been published the previous month, but felt that Ellison's approach to the concept was preferable.
