= Paying It Forward =

- Short story by Michael A. Burstein
- Language: English
- Genre: Science fiction

Publication
- Published in: Analog Science Fiction and Fact
- Publication type: Magazine
- Publication date: September 2003

"Paying It Forward" is a science fiction short story by American writer Michael A. Burstein, published in 2003. It was nominated for the 2004 Hugo Award for Best Short Story. It may be confused with the novel Pay it Forward by Catherine Ryan Hyde. And the term Paying it Forward is used in her book

== Plot summary ==
The story is told from an unnamed narrator's point of view, who describes his relationship with a famous science fiction author via a series of email correspondences. The strange thing is that the correspondences don't begin until after the author's death. Throughout many years the narrator receives great wisdom from the deceased author, only learning the truth when he himself is about to die.
