= Elemental (story) =

1984 science fiction novella

"Elemental" is a science fantasy novella by Geoffrey A. Landis. It was first published in Analog Science Fiction, in December 1984.

== Synopsis ==
In a late 21st century where magic has been systematized and incorporated into technology, two graduate students and their advisors discover the signs of an imminent disaster.

== Reception ==
"Elemental" was a finalist for the 1985 Hugo Award for Best Novella.

SF Site describes it as having a "Connie Willis-rewrites-Heinlein's-Magic, Inc. flavour", but notes that it "doesn't quite work". John Grant, writing at Infinity Plus, judged it to be "a piece of (relative) juvenilia", "clumsy", and "a bit of an embarrassment", and observed that Landis has admitted to having "mixed feelings about" the story.
