= Unknown Number =

Short story by Blue Neustifter

- Short story by Blue Neustifter
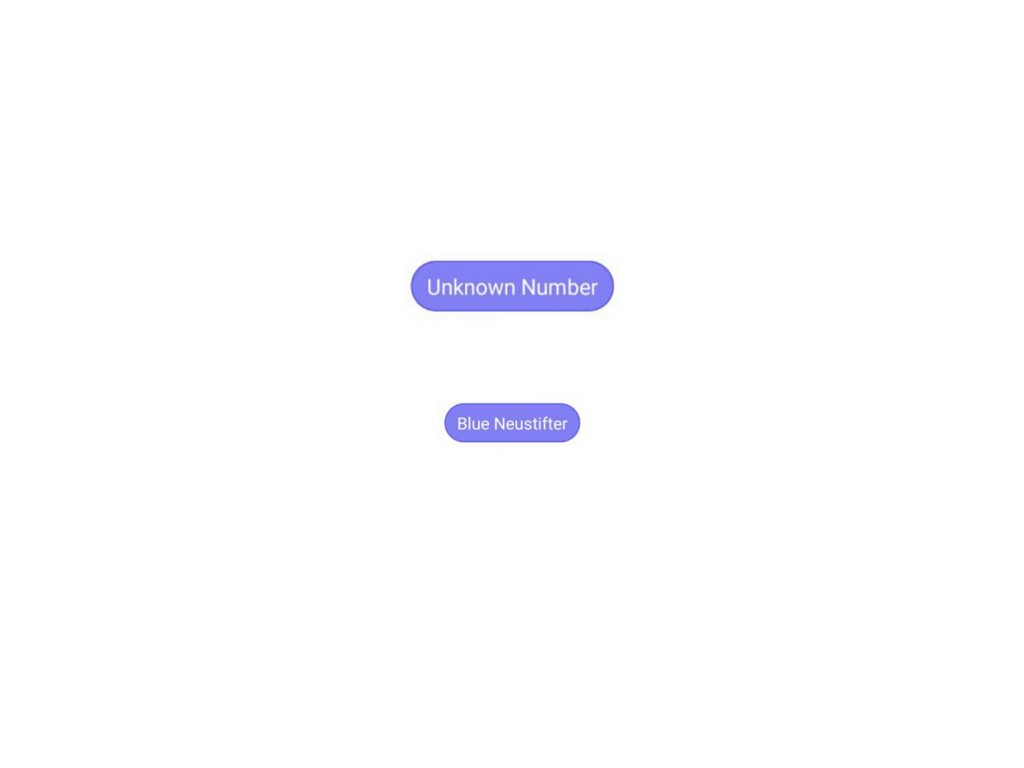
- 2023 ebook cover
- Country: Canada
- Language: English
- Genres: Science fiction; Transgender fiction; Epistolary fiction

Publication
- Published in: Twitter
- Publication type: Thread of tweets
- Media type: Text message (SMS) screenshots
- Publication date: 27 July 2021

"Unknown Number" is a science fiction epistolary short story by Blue Neustifter. It was initially published as a thread on Twitter under the username "Azure" in 2021 and later compiled into an ebook in 2023.

== Synopsis ==
Bi Dyke Energy
(@Azure_Husky)
tweeted:

[I don't usually preface writing with this, but given the format it seems prudent in this case: This thread is a work of fiction]

27 July 2021

Rather than being a narrative, the story is a series of text messages between Gaby — a trans woman — and "Unknown", an alternate version of herself from a parallel universe where she did not transition.

== Reception ==
"Unknown Number" was a finalist for the 2022 Hugo Award for Best Short Story. File770 emphasized that it was "the first piece of short fiction published on Twitter" to receive such an honor.

CBC.ca called it "intimate and moving". The Yale Review praised it for "treat[ing]" both Gaby and Unknown "with empathy and compassion", and noted it as an example of a "rich[] narrative (...) produced by [a] minoritized creator[]." WomenWriteAboutComics declared it to be a "formalistic experiment", comparing it to Sarah Pinsker's "Where Oaken Hearts Do Gather", and stating that it "reaches into a deep area of transgender experience" while "mak[ing] a few gestures towards the worldbuilding arising from its central science fiction concept" and "do[ing] a good job of fleshing out" Gaby and Unknown.

== Origins ==
Neustifter originally intended to write a story about Gaby going back in time to help her pre-transition self figure out gender identity early, but realized that not only would this risk "mak[ing Gaby into] someone entirely different", there was also "a bunch of other stuff Gaby should warn her past self about", such as the COVID-19 pandemic and the election of Donald Trump.

As well, she has estimated that the actual writing of the dialogue between Gaby and Unknown took "less than a third" of the process, with the rest being devoted to "painstakingly creating each 'screenshot,' including estimating how much time had passed for each screen (to update the clock in the top-right) and keeping the battery indicator moving steadily downward in a realistic manner."
