= The Ghost Pit =

- Short story by Stephen Baxter
- Language: English
- Genre(s): Science fiction

Publication
- Published in: Asimov's Science Fiction
- Publication type: Magazine
- Publication date: July 2001

"The Ghost Pit" is a science fiction short story by British writer Stephen Baxter, published in 2001. It was nominated for the 2002 Hugo Award for Best Short Story as well as the 2002 Locus Award and 2002 Asimov's Reader Poll.

== Plot summary ==
The story follows Raida, a young woman on a hunting expedition, who is teamed with her mother's old partner, L'Eesh. The two are investigating a large jovian planet for the presence of rare aliens known as Ghosts when their spacecraft is attacked and they crash land on one of the planet's moons. As they walk to the artificially constructed bridge that connects the two moons, Raida learns more about Ghosts, her mother and how much she can trust her partner.
