= Wild Minds =

Short story by Michael Swanwick

- Short story by Michael Swanwick
- Language: English
- Genre: science fiction short story

Publication
- Published in: Asimov's Science Fiction
- Publication type: Magazine
- Publication date: May 1998

"Wild Minds" is a science fiction short story published in 1998 by Michael Swanwick. It was nominated for the 1999 Hugo Award for Best Short Story.

== Plot summary ==
The story follows Thom, a Catholic man who refuses to get his brain "optimized." After meeting Hellene, an HR representative from Prague who does have an optimized brain, he brings her back to his place for a visit. She tries to convince him of the benefits of optimization, and he explain the reasons he hasn’t done it.
