= Mars Crossing =

2000 novel by Geoffrey A. Landis

Mars Crossing is a science-fiction novel by Geoffrey A. Landis about an expedition to Mars, published by Tor Books in 2000. The novel was a nominee for the Nebula award, and won the Locus Award for best first novel in 2001.

The characters in the novel are members of the third expedition to Mars, following the failures of earlier Brazilian and American expeditions. The mission plan is based on the Mars Direct concept, where fuel is manufactured from the Martian atmosphere; the Brazilian Mars expedition selected a polar landing.

The book was released by Tor Books, a division of Macmillan USA, as a hardcover in December 2000, with the Science Fiction Book Club edition published in 2001. A paperback edition appeared in November 2001, and a second edition paperback in December 2016.

== Reception ==
Locus reviewer Jonathan Strahan praised the book as "a strong first novel," saying that its "real strength (...) has less to do with realistic portrayals of science at work, though there is plenty of that, and more to do with (the) characters and the drama they face." Kirkus Reviews, conversely, praised Landis's depiction of "the planet, the engineering, and the epic trek", but felt that "the melodramatic baggage—dark pasts, evil deeds, sinister plots—just drags along behind, raising the dust."

In his extended essay "The Renewal of Hard Science Fiction", David M. Hassler compared the book with Allen Steele's novel Labryrinth of Night, saying, "in these novels, both the terrain and the means of coping with it represent plausible, strange, and hence slightly funny measures all at the same time," and concludes that Landis "succeeds even more [than Steele] at conveying the sense of the lonely, isolate character (the lonely inventor, perhaps) left to stand heroically against a cold universe."

== See also ==
- Mars in fiction
