= Ray Aldridge =

American author of speculative fiction

- Born: July 6, 1948 (age 78); Syracuse, New York
- Occupation: author
- Writing career
- Genre: Speculative fiction

Raymon Huebert Aldridge is an American author of speculative fiction. He writes under the name Ray Aldridge.

== Life and writing career ==
Aldridge was born in Syracuse, New York. The appearance of his first published work of science fiction has been credited to the July 1987 issue of Amazing Stories, although an earlier work seems to have previously appeared in the anthology L. Ron Hubbard Presents Writers of the Future, Volume II in March 1986. Aldridge's style has been likened to those of Cordwainer Smith and Jack Vance.

Aldridge's writing has appeared in various periodicals and anthologies, including Aboriginal Science Fiction, Amazing Stories, The Bulletin of the Science Fiction Writers of America, Full Spectrum 4, L. Ron Hubbard Presents Writers of the Future, Volume II, L. Ron Hubbard Presents Writers of the Future, Volume VII, The Magazine of Fantasy & Science Fiction, Pulphouse: The Hardback Magazine, Science Fiction Age, and Whatdunits. His work has been translated into German, Italian, and French.

== Recognition ==
Aldridge's story "Gate of Faces" won the 1992 SF Chronicle Award for Best Novelette, and was nominated for the 1992 Nebula Award for Best Novelette. His story "The Beauty Addict" was nominated for the 1994 Nebula Award for Best Novella and placed eighth in the 1994 Locus Poll Award for Best Novelette. His story "The Spine Divers" placed third in the 1996 Theodore Sturgeon Award. His stories "Steel Dogs," "Hyena Eyes," "The Cold Cage" were also Locus Poll Award nominees.

== Bibliography ==
=== Emancipator series ===
1. The Pharaoh Contract (1991)
2. The Emperor of Everything (1992)
3. The Orpheus Machine (1992)

=== Dilvermoon series ===
- "The Beastbreaker" (1991)
- "Gate of Faces" (1991)
- "The Love Farmer" (1992)
- "The Spine Divers" (1995)

=== Flesh Tinker series ===
- "The Flesh Tinker and the Loneliest Man" (1987)
- "The Flesh Tinker and the Fashion Goddess" (1989)

=== Short stories ===
- "Click" (1986)
- "Boneflower" (1988)
- "The Touch of the Hook" (1988)
- "Floating Castles" (1988)
- "Her Virtues" (1989)
- "Blue Skin" (1989)
- "Eyebright" (1989)
- "Chump Change" (1989)
- "Steel Dogs" (1989)
- "The Cold Cage" (1990)
- "Hyena Eyes" (1990)
- "We Were Butterflies" (1990)
- "The Fabularium" (1991)
- "Winedark" (1992)
- "Obscurocious" (1992)
- "The Beauty Addict" (1993)
- "Somatoys" (1993)
- "Filter Feeders" (1994)
- "The Biomantic's Last Husband" (1994)
- "Stolen Faces, Stolen Names" (1995)
- "Soul Pipes" (2002)
