= I, Rocket =

1944 short story by Ray Bradbury

- Short story by Ray Bradbury
- Country: United States
- Language: English
- Genre: Science fiction

Publication
- Published in: Amazing Stories
- Publication type: Periodical
- Media type: Print magazine
- Publication date: 1944

"I, Rocket" is a science fiction short story by U.S. writer Ray Bradbury, first published in the May 1944 issue of the science fiction magazine Amazing Stories. It focuses on the war experiences of a rocket ship built for combat, as told from the ship's point of view.

The story won the 1945 Retro Hugo Award for Best Short Story in 2020. It has been considered to be the story that made Bradbury famous.

== Plot ==
The story opens with the rocket ship describing its state of disrepair, stranded on an unnamed planetoid. As it rusts, it reminisces about the experiences it had in earlier years.

The rocket ship first became self-aware around the time its construction was completed at an Earth base. After a mayor christened the ship in a ceremony that the ship characterized as a stupid waste of fine champagne, the warship took off with a crew of twenty-seven, heading toward Phobos-Deimos Base (Note: Phobos and Deimos are moons of Mars. The story also makes reference to "Deimos-Phobos Base", which is presumably the same base.) to fight in a war against the Martians.

Captain Lamb made small talk with some members of his crew, unaware that two of them, Larion and Belloc, were planning to destroy the ship. The ship itself, however, was aware of this, and although it was unable to speak, it explained to the reader that it did not approve of the plan, pointing out that survival instincts can be found not only in amoebas and humans, but also in metal objects such as itself. Larion and Belloc discussed the plan to use bombs to disable the engines, revealing that they were motivated by money to destroy the ship.

Lamb entered the computation room and chatted with Ayres, who was on his first spaceflight, about how people on Earth tended to be atheistic or agnostic, but ended up converting to a religion on their first trip into space. Lamb then entered the galley and consumed a bowl of soup served by the Slop, inventor of the gravity soup bowl and gravity spoon. The Slop and Lamb also chatted, with the Slop mentioning that he joined the mission because his parents were killed by Martians three years earlier, and Lamb stating that he joined because he met a Martian girl on Mars five years prior, before being recalled due to the war.

After Larion left Belloc alone in the engine room to retrieve the bombs, an oil line burst, sending an oil pipe into Belloc's face and killing him. Lamb, Larion, and some other crewmembers rushed to the engine room. Upon seeing Belloc dead, Larion assumed that one of the crew had figured out their plans and killed Belloc. Larion rushed from the scene, only to apparently kill himself in an accident with an airlock.

Once the ship arrived at the base, it fought in the war for months. It then returned to Earth for new crewmembers before heading back to the front. Eventually, the war ended, and the ship was repurposed. After five years transporting cargo, it crashed on a planetoid. The crew was killed, leaving the ship stranded. Months later, Lamb, who became a patrol inspector, found the ship. He talked about trouble brewing on Venus, and how he wanted to captain the ship again and fight the Venerians. After Lamb flew off to fetch a repair crew, the ship waited for Lamb's return, excitedly.

== Background ==
Before the publication of "I, Rocket", U.S. writer Ray Bradbury sold newspapers from a Los Angeles street corner during the day while trying to establish his reputation as a writer by composing short stories and poems in a library at night. Although he had already written over a hundred stories for various magazines before "I, Rocket" was published, his writing went virtually unnoticed by literary critics.

"I, Rocket" is the first submission of his to the science fiction magazine Amazing Stories that was accepted. It is also the longest science fiction story that Bradbury had written at the time.

== Analysis ==
In Amazing Stories, science fiction writer Jean Marie Stine stated that "I, Rocket" is the first story where "the viewpoint character and first-person narrator is a fully conscious, intelligent and aware spaceship". She speculated that the idea to write from a rocket ship's perspective may have ultimately come from Amazing Stories editor Raymond A. Palmer, stating that Palmer may have suggested the idea to Bradbury directly, or Bradbury may have been inspired by Eando Binder's short story "I, Robot", which was written from the perspective of a robot, and had been published in the January 1939 issue of Amazing Stories.

Stine noted that "I, Rocket" followed the pattern of many other stories by Bradbury: an otherworldly setting for a story that was focused on neither the mechanical nor the scientific, but rather on the human or humanlike attributes of the story's characters.

== Reception ==
"I, Rocket" is Bradbury's first story to be featured on the cover of a magazine. Stine considers this story to be the one that made Bradbury famous and established his reputation as a writer of science fiction.

The story won the 1945 Retro Hugo Award for Best Short Story in 2020.

== Publication history ==
"I, Rocket" was first published in the May 1944 issue of Amazing Stories. It was made freely available on the web site of Amazing Stories in 2014.

In 1953, a seven-page comic adaptation, illustrated by Al Williamson and Frank Frazetta, was published by EC Comics in Weird Fantasy #20. (Note: Comic Book Resources also credits Roy Krenkel as an illustrator.) The original artwork was put up for auction in 2019 and was expected to sell for between 60,000 and 80,000 USD. EC Comics also published comic adaptations of 24 other Bradbury stories during the early 1950s, all of which were collected and republished in Home to Stay!: The Complete Ray Bradbury EC Stories in 2022.
