= Brooke Bolander =

American speculative fiction writer

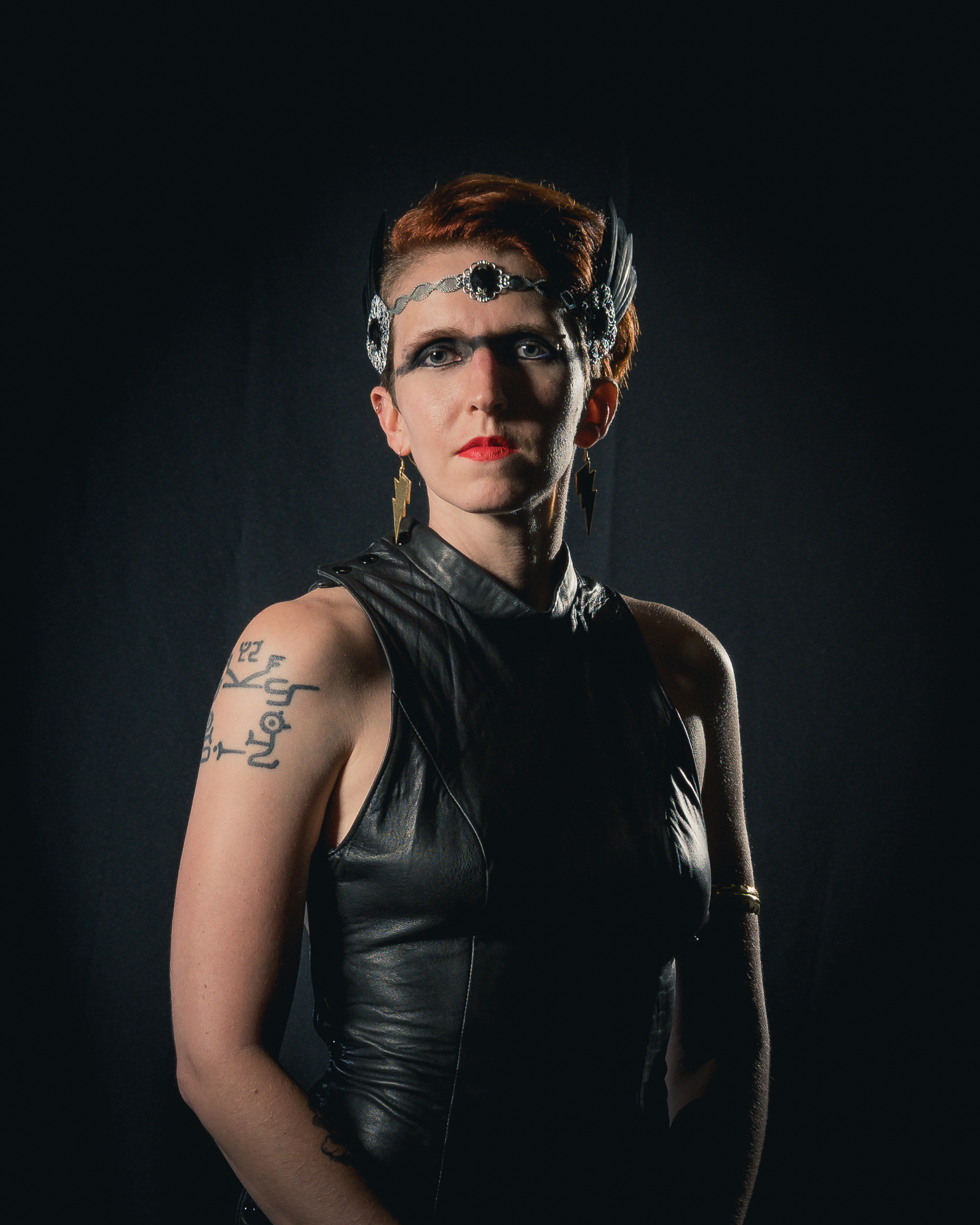
- Brooke Bolander at Worldcon in Helsinki, 2017
- Education: University of Leicester; Clarion Workshop
- Occupation: Short fiction author
- Writing career
- Language: English
- Period: 2008–present
- Genre: Speculative fiction
- Notable work: The Only Harmless Great Thing (2018)
- Notable awards: Nebula–Novelette (2018); Locus–Novelette (2018)
- Website: brookebolander.com

Brooke Bolander is an American author of speculative fiction.

== Biography ==
Bolander attended the University of Leicester, studying History and Archaeology, and is a graduate of the 2011 Clarion Workshop.

== Literary career ==
Bolander's work, including both short fiction and essays, has been published in venues such as Lightspeed, Uncanny Magazine, and Strange Horizons.

Her novelette "And You Shall Know Her by the Trail of Dead" (2015), first published in Lightspeed, was a finalist for the 2015 Nebula Award for Best Novelette, the 2016 Hugo Award for Best Novelette, and the 2016 Locus Award for Best Novelette. It was included in The Year's Best Science Fiction: Thirty-Third Annual Collection.

Her short story "Our Talons Can Crush Galaxies" (2016), in Uncanny Magazine, was a finalist for the 2016 Nebula Award for Best Short Story and the 2017 Hugo Award for Best Short Story.

Her novelette The Only Harmless Great Thing (2018), released by Tor, won the 2018 Nebula Award for Best Novelette and the 2019 Locus Award for Best Novelette, and was a finalist for the 2019 Hugo Award for Best Novelette.

== Awards and nominations ==
Year	Title	Award	Category	Result	Ref
2015	"And You Shall Know Her by the Trail of Dead"	Nebula Award	Novelette	Shortlisted	
2016	"And You Shall Know Her by the Trail of Dead"	Hugo Award	Novelette	Shortlisted	
2016	"And You Shall Know Her by the Trail of Dead"	Locus Award	Novelette	Nominated	
2016	"And You Shall Know Her by the Trail of Dead"	Theodore Sturgeon Award	—	Shortlisted	
2016	"Our Talons Can Crush Galaxies"	Nebula Award	Short Story	Shortlisted	
2017	"Our Talons Can Crush Galaxies"	Hugo Award	Short Story	Shortlisted	
2017	"Our Talons Can Crush Galaxies"	World Fantasy Award	Short Fiction	Shortlisted	
2018	The Only Harmless Great Thing	Nebula Award	Novelette	Won	
2019	The Only Harmless Great Thing	Hugo Award	Novelette	Shortlisted	
2019	The Only Harmless Great Thing	Locus Award	Novelette	Won	
2019	The Only Harmless Great Thing	Shirley Jackson Award	Novella	Shortlisted	
2019	The Only Harmless Great Thing	Theodore Sturgeon Award	—	Shortlisted	
2019	The Only Harmless Great Thing	World Fantasy Award	Novella	Shortlisted	
2019	"The Tale of the Three Beautiful Raptor Sisters..."	Hugo Award	Short Story	Shortlisted	

== Bibliography ==
Source: ISFDB

=== Fiction ===
- "Trickster Blues" (2008)
- "Her Words Like Hunting Vixens Spring" (2012)
- "Tornado's Siren" (2012)
- "Sun Dogs" (2012)
- "The Beasts of the Earth, the Madness of Men" (2013)
- "Darlings" (2014)
- "The Legend of RoboNinja" (2014)
- "Mechanical Animals" (2014)
- "And You Shall Know Her by the Trail of Dead" (2015)
- "Our Talons Can Crush Galaxies" (2016)
- "The Last of the Minotaur Wives" (2017)
- The Only Harmless Great Thing (2018)
- "The Tale of the Three Beautiful Raptor Sisters, and the Prince Who Was Made of Meat" (2018)
- "No Flight Without the Shatter" (2018)
- Kindle (2019)
- A Bird, a Song, a Revolution (2019)
- A Glossary of Radicalization (2020)
- Where the River Turns to Concrete (2020)

=== Nonfiction ===
- "Breaching the Gap" (2014)
- "Introduction" (Genius Loci) (2016)
- "The Uncanny Dinosaurs—Introduction" (2018)

== See also ==
- List of science-fiction authors
