= The Woman the Unicorn Loved =

1981 short story by Gene Wolfe

"The Woman the Unicorn Loved" is a 1981 science fiction short story by Gene Wolfe. It was first published in Asimov's Science Fiction.

== Synopsis ==
A unicorn is created by genetic engineering and gets loose on a college campus.

== Reception ==
"The Woman the Unicorn Loved" was a finalist for the 1982 Hugo Award for Best Short Story.
