= Ralph Williams (author) =

Ralph William Slone (1914–1959) was a science fiction writer who used the pseudonym Ralph Williams. He contributed to the magazine Astounding Stories of Super-Science. He was born in 1914 in Illinois and died in 1959 in Alaska. He died in a fishing accident, according to a letter written by his son.

== Selected works ==
His most notable work, the novelette "Cat and Mouse," was a finalist for the Hugo Award for Best Short Story in 1960. The story concerns a protagonist Ed Brown in Alaska as he discovers an alien civilization among wooded mountains.

Another novelette, of 1958, "Business As Usual During Alterations," has been cited many times. It describes economics changed by experimentation.
