= Michael A. Burstein =

American writer

- Born: 1970 (age 55–56); New York City, U.S.
- Education: Harvard College; Boston University
- Occupations: Author; editor; teacher
- Spouse: Nomi Burstein
- Children: 2

Michael A. Burstein (born 1970) is an American writer of science fiction.

== Background ==
Michael A. Burstein was born in New York City, and grew up in Forest Hills in the borough of Queens. He attended Hunter College High School in Manhattan and went on to Harvard College where he was a member of the Harvard-Radcliffe Science Fiction Association. He graduated Harvard in 1991 with a degree in Physics; in 1993 he earned a Master's in Physics from Boston University. In 1994 Burstein attended the Clarion Workshop. In 1995 he studied comic book writing under Dennis O'Neil at the School of Visual Arts in Manhattan.

== Writing career ==
Burstein's first published story, "TeleAbsence", which appeared in the July 1995 issue of Analog, was nominated for the Hugo Award and was chosen by the readers of Analog as the best short story published by the magazine in 1995. Two years later, Burstein won the John W. Campbell Award for Best New Writer at the 1997 World Science Fiction Convention, LoneStarCon2.

Burstein subsequently received Hugo nominations for "Broken Symmetry", "Cosmic Corkscrew", "Kaddish for the Last Survivor" (also a Nebula Award nominee), "Spaceships", "Paying It Forward", "Decisions", "Time Ablaze", "Seventy-Five Years", and "TelePresence", and a Nebula and Sturgeon Award nomination for "Reality Check". His novella "Sanctuary" was chosen by the readers of Analog as the best novella published by the magazine in 2005 and was a nominee for the Nebula Award.

Burstein's short story collection I Remember the Future: The Award-Nominated Stories of Michael A. Burstein was released by Apex Publications on November 1, 2008. On February 19, 2010, the Science Fiction and Fantasy Writers of America announced that the title story from the collection had been nominated for the 2009 Nebula Award for Best Short Story.

Burstein is the editor of Jewish Futures: Stories from the World's Oldest Diaspora, an anthology of speculative fiction published by Fantastic Books on August 7, 2023. The book's crowdfunding campaign on Kickstarter was launched in October 2022 by Ian Randal Strock and met its funding goal in four days.

Burstein currently contributes columns to the science fiction entertainment website SFScope.

From 1998 to 2000, Burstein served as Secretary of the Science Fiction and Fantasy Writers of America. He chaired the final Nebula Script jury in 2008. On January 1, 2014, he took office as the first permanent president of the Society for the Advancement of Speculative Storytelling, Inc. (SASS). He served for one year.

From 2014 until 2017, Burstein was a news correspondent for The Jewish Advocate.

== Public office ==
Burstein is an elected town meeting member and public library trustee in the town of Brookline, Massachusetts.

On Feb 8, 2012, Burstein announced the formation of an exploratory committee for a congressional run as a Democrat in the Massachusetts 4th Congressional District, but eventually decided not to run.

== Personal life ==
Burstein has worked as a science teacher at all levels, and edits science textbooks. He has given lectures and spoken at various science fiction conferences and libraries, and to groups at MIT and Harvard. He has been an active member of science fiction fandom.

Burstein lives with his wife Nomi in Brookline. Their children, fraternal twin girls, were born in 2009. With his wife, Burstein wrote the Brookline Parent column for the Brookline Patch website.

Burstein is president of the Society for the Preservation of Pluto as a Planet, which goes by the acronym SP3. The group of astronomy buffs formed in the spring of 2006.
