= Ian Randal Strock =

Ian Randal Strock (born in 1966 in Brooklyn, New York) is an American writer, editor, and publisher. He graduated from Boston University with a degree in Political Science.

== Editing ==
Strock is the owner of Gray Rabbit Publications, LLC, an independent publishing company. He also serves as the publisher and editor-in-chief of the company's imprints Fantastic Books, which he purchased from Warren Lapine’s Tir Na Nog Press in 2010, and Milherst. (Gray Rabbit’s imprint Multiminded is published by Charles Barouch.)

Strock’s first editorial job was as the Deputy Editorial Page Editor of Boston University's Daily Free Press from 1986 to 1987. He then served on the editorial staff of Analog Science Fiction and Fact and Asimov's Science Fiction magazines from 1989 to 1995, when he left to launch his own magazine, Artemis, which appeared from 2000 to 2003. He was the news editor of Science Fiction Chronicle from 2005 until the magazine’s final issue in 2006, and then moved those efforts to SFScope, which he founded and edited from 2007 until 2012.

== Writing ==
His first professionally published short story was "Fermat’s Legacy" in the September 1992 issue of Analog. He has also sold stories to Nature, Amazing Stories, and numerous anthologies.

- Writing Science Fiction and Fantasy (co-edited with Gardner Dozois, Tina Lee, Stanley Schmidt, and Sheila Williams) (St. Martin's Press, 1991)
- The Presidential Book of Lists: From Most to Least, Elected to Rejected, Worst to Cursed: Fascinating Facts About Our Chief Executives (Villard/Random House, 2008)
- So You Want to Get Rich as a Writer? (Gray Rabbit Publications, 2014)
- Ranking the First Ladies: True Tales and Trivia, from Martha Washington to Michelle Obama (Carrel Books/Skyhorse, 2016)
- Ranking the Vice Presidents: True Tales and Trivia, from John Adams to Joe Biden (Carrel Books/Skyhorse, 2016)
- Wandering Through Time: The Collected Short Fiction (So Far) (Fantastic Books, 2024)
- Punctilious Punctuation (Milherst Publishing, 2025)

== Awards ==
- 1997: "Living is the Best Revenge," AnLab Award for Best Short Story
- 1997: "The Coming of the Money Card: Boon or Bane?" AnLab Award for Best Fact Article
- 2024: American Mensa, National Service Award
- 2025: Skylark Award

== Non-profits ==
Strock serves on the Board of Advisors of The Moon Society, an outgrowth of the 1990s Artemis Project (of which he was a co-founder, and the original vice president of the Artemis Society International).

Strock served on the board of directors of American Mensa in several elected positions. He was First Vice Chair (2024), Secretary (2021–2024), and Regional Vice Chair representing Region 1 (2017–2021).

Strock was twice elected the Treasurer of the Science Fiction and Fantasy Writers of America, and served from 1998 to 2000.
