= The Best Christmas Ever (story) =

- Short story by James Patrick Kelly
- Country: United States
- Language: English
- Genre: Science fiction short story

Publication
- Published in: Sci Fiction
- Publication type: website
- Publication date: 26 May 2004

"The Best Christmas Ever" is a science fiction short story written in 2004 by James Patrick Kelly.

== Synopsis ==
Albert Hopkins is the last man on earth, cared for by shapeshifting biop androids. Granted his every wish, Albert is slipping into depression and the biops try everything to bring him out of it - including throwing a Christmas party that they think he will truly enjoy.

== Reception ==
"The Best Christmas Ever" was a finalist for the 2005 Hugo Award for Best Short Story.

At Tangent Online, Dave Truesdale found it to be "poignant and occasionally charming", as well as "uplifting (...) in a depressing sort of way", and noted that although Kelly does not include any details of the events that led to the extinction of humanity, "his characters are so well-realized and sympathetic" that this lack of information is "only a passing curiosity rather than a gaping flaw".

In Locus, Gary K. Wolfe noted that Kelly "skillfully evokes the role of the past – our present – in sustaining" Albert, who Wolfe calls "rather sad". John Clute felt that the story "ends at a lower state of energy than it began".
