= A Walk in the Sun (short story) =

- Short story by Geoffrey A. Landis
- Country: United States
- Language: English
- Genre: Science fiction

Publication
- Published in: Asimov's Science Fiction
- Publication type: Magazine
- Publication date: October 1991

"A Walk in the Sun" is a hard science fiction short story published in 1991 by American writer Geoffrey A. Landis. It won the 1992 Hugo Award for Best Short Story, the 1992 Asimov's Reader Poll Award and was nominated for the 1992 Locus Award.

== Plot summary ==
The story follows Trish, the sole survivor of a terrible crash landing on the Moon. After coming to her senses, she contacts Earth and learns that it will be thirty days before a rescue mission can reach her. In the meantime, she depends on a wing-like solar panel to provide power to her suit's recycling facilities, and lunar night is approaching.

To stay alive, Trish has to keep walking continually to stay in the sunlight. Due to exhaustion and loneliness, she starts hallucinating that her elder sister Karen is with her, whose death some years earlier Trish has not yet fully coped with.
