= Cat and Mouse in Partnership =

German fairy tale

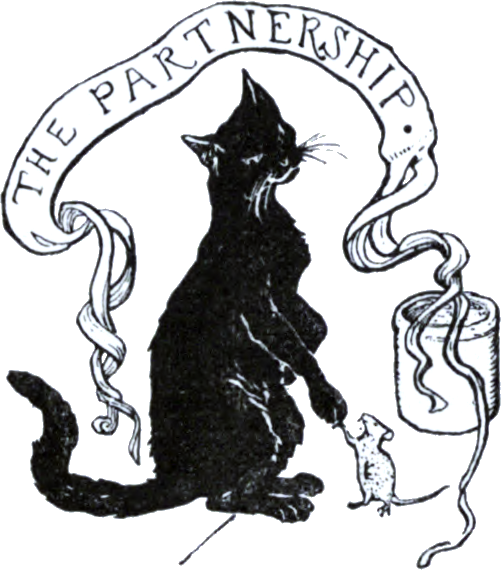
- 1894 illustration by Henry Justice Ford

Folk tale
- Name: Cat and Mouse in Partnership
- Aarne–Thompson grouping: ATU 15 (Stealing the Partner's Butter)
- Country: Germany
- Published in: Grimm's Fairy Tales

"Cat and Mouse in Partnership" (German: Katze und Maus in Gesellschaft) is a German fairy tale collected by the Brothers Grimm in Grimms' Fairy Tales (KHM 2). It is a story of Aarne-Thompson type 15 ("Stealing the Partner's Butter").

== Origin ==
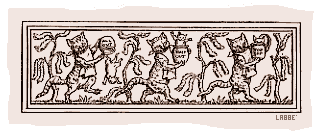
Illustration of the fairy tale by Walter Crane

A shorter version of the tale was included in the Brothers Grimm's manuscript collection of 1808, and published in the first edition of Kinder- und Hausmärchen in 1812. Their version is based upon an oral tradition communicated by Gretchen Wild (1787–1819) in Kassel.

== Plot ==
A cat and a mouse, contrary to the custom of their kinds, become friends, such good friends that they decide to share a home. That they might have something to fall back on in time of need, they buy a pot of fat and hide it away in a nook of a church for safekeeping. After a short time, the cat tells her housemate that one of her relations has given birth and that she has been asked to be godmother. Instead of going to a christening, though, the cat goes to the nook of the church and eats the top layer of the fat in the pot. When the cat returns home, the mouse asks the name of the kitten. The cat replies, "Top-off." The mouse remarks that she has never heard such a name.

Soon thereafter, the cat announces that she again has been invited to a christening. On the cat's return, the mouse asks what name was given to this kitten. "Half-gone," answers the cat. Again the mouse wonders aloud at the oddness of the name.

The cat goes a third time to the church, this time finishing off the fat. When the cat returns, the mouse asks the name given at this christening. "All-gone," answers the cat. Again the mouse shakes her head.

Winter arrives, and with it the lean times the friends had anticipated. The mouse proposes a trip to the church to retrieve the provisions stored there. When she beholds the empty pot, enlightenment dawns on the mouse: "First 'Top-off,' " she murmurs, "then 'Half-gone,' and then ..." The cat warns her to say no more, but the mouse persists. The cat pounces on the mouse and eats her up. "And that is the way of the world," the story closes.
