= Cat and Mouse (Ralph Williams story) =

- Short story by Ralph Williams
- Country: USA
- Language: English
- Genre: Science fiction

Publication
- Published in: Astounding
- Publication type: Periodical
- Publisher: Street & Smith
- Media type: Magazine
- Publication date: June 1959

"Cat and Mouse" is a science fiction novelette by Ralph Williams. Originally published in the June 1959 issue of Astounding Science Fiction, it was nominated for, but did not win, the 1960 Hugo Award for Best Short Fiction.

== Plot summary ==
The story is set in Alaska. Its main protagonist is Ed Brown, a trapper who has just begun a winter's stay in the wooded mountains. He soon discovers a "hole" into another world.

At this point in the story, the reader has already been told about the hole and the other world. The other world, named in the story only as World 7, is being used by an alien civilization as an experimental ground for transplanting intelligent life from different planets. However, World 7 has inadvertently been infested with a Harn, an intelligent predator. The entity overseeing the planet, known in the story only as the Warden, needs to eliminate the Harn and decides that the easiest way to do this is to open a portal from World 7 to Earth. The Warden's intention is to have the people of Earth kill the Harn.

His curiosity piqued by what he sees through the portal, Ed Brown passes through and investigates the other world. He soon comes into conflict with the Harn, but escapes back through to Earth. The Harn follows him through the portal and a final fight takes place in the mountains of Alaska. The Harn is a colony organism that can produce individuals of different sizes, shapes, and armaments, though it is limited by available resources. As the conflict develops, it tries to win by producing two large, lethal individuals.

Ed, being prepared for a winter in a hostile landscape, has several firearms with him, including shotguns, hunting rifles and light "varmint" guns. He has "snakeproof" pants and other backwoods equipment. The creatures are also allergic to tobacco: he can drive off some of the smaller ones by spitting tobacco juice at them.

The narrative dwells on Ed's need to conserve ammunition by not wasting heavy ammo on small targets. He is able to drive back most of the attacks, but is left with limited ammunition just as the Harn activates the final attackers. Realizing that the creature must have a central controller, he goes to World 7 while the Harn is mostly on Earth. He finds a burrow by following tracks, pours gasoline in and lights it. Just then the final attackers appear. They are huge bear-like creatures with fangs, claws, and six legs. Ed shoots one several times with his rifle but is injured as it makes a dying lunge. The second creature appears, but fortunately the Harn dies, and it collapses.

The final scene has Ed watching as a stranger looks at the battlefield, smiles at him and disappears. This is evidently the Warden. Ed returns to his normal routine.

== Publication history ==
In addition to its original appearance in Astounding Science Fiction, "Cat and Mouse" appeared in the November 1959 issue of the British version of Astounding.

The novelette has never been anthologized, nor has it been included in any collection devoted to Williams' work (indeed, no such collection has ever been published). In 2011, "Cat and Mouse" was published as a chapbook by Aegypan Press.

The foregoing was taken from the story's listing in the Internet Speculative Fiction Database (for which see the External Links section below). More detail on its publication history can be found at that listing.

== The author ==
Little is known about Ralph Williams. What little is known comes from a letter written by one of his sons to a science-fiction web site. In that letter, the son reports that his father's actual name was Ralph William Slone and that he died in 1959 (at age 45) while fishing on Kachemak Bay (in Alaska).

"Cat and Mouse" was the last of Williams' stories to be published. More detail on his publication history can be found at his listing in the Internet Speculative Fiction Database (for which see the External Links section below).
