= Absolute Magnitude (magazine) =

American science fiction magazine

- Winter 1999 cover
- Editor: Warren Lapine
- Categories: Science fiction
- Publisher: DNA Publications
- First issue: Spring/Summer 1993
- Final issue Number: Spring 2005; 23
- Country: United States
- Based in: Radford, Virginia
- Language: English
- ISSN: 1070-6569

Absolute Magnitude is an American discontinued, semi-professional science fiction magazine started in Spring/Summer 1993 issue under the name Harsh Mistress. However, in 1994 after only two issues the name was changed to Absolute Magnitude. In 2002 the name was changed again to Absolute Magnitude & Aboriginal Science Fiction when the publishers acquired the rights to Aboriginal Science Fiction. Absolute Magnitude was published by DNA Publications and edited by Warren Lapine. During this period it was headquartered in Radford, Virginia. Although it was supposed to be a quarterly magazine its actual releases were irregular. After releasing twenty-one issues under the Absolute Magnitude title (plus two as Harsh Mistress), Spring 2005 issue was the final issue of the magazine.

Absolute Magnitude was nominated for the 2002 Hugo Award for Best Semiprozine with Lapine noted as the editor.

== Anthology ==
Absolute Magnitude is also a collection of sixteen stories taken from the magazine between 1993 and 1997. The anthology was published by Tor Books and was released on April 15, 1997. It has been issued in both hardcover and paperback editions.

== Contributors ==
Authors who worked for the magazine included:

- Ben Bova
- Terry Bisson
- Hal Clement
- Alan Dean Foster
- Barry B. Longyear
- Allen Steele, columnist: Primary Ignition
- William F. Wu

== See also ==
- List of defunct American periodicals
