= Aboriginal Science Fiction =

American science fiction magazine (1986–2001)

- November/December 1989 cover
- Editor: Charles Ryan
- Categories: Science fiction
- Publisher: Aboriginal SF (October 1986 - May 1987); Absolute Entertainment, Inc. (July 1987 - July 1991); The Second Renaissance Foundation (December 1991 - Spring 2001)
- Founder: Charles Ryan
- First issue: October 1986
- Final issue Number: Spring 2001; 49
- Country: United States
- Based in: Woburn, Massachusetts
- ISSN: 0895-3198
- OCLC: 16568156

Aboriginal Science Fiction was a high-circulation semi-professional science fiction magazine started in October 1986 by editor Charles Ryan. After releasing 49 issues it ceased publication in the spring of 2001. In 2002 the rights to Aboriginal Science Fiction were acquired by Absolute Magnitude.

== Origins of the name ==
In an interview Charles Ryan explained his choice of name as follows:

At that time there was Analog, and Asimov's, and Amazing, which had all been around for a while. We looked at those names and realized that newer authors -- the people we wanted to focus on -- would use one of two methods to choose who they'd submit to. Some writers would submit first to whoever paid the most, but there are lots of others who just go through the list alphabetically, so we wanted a name that would put us near the front of the market list. First I thought of "Aardvark", but then I thought I remembered a fanzine with that name and I didn't want people to get confused. Then we thought of "Aboriginal", and came up with this whole story about an alien anthropologist who'd been sent to Earth to study the indigenous population -- the Aboriginals -- and got so intrigued by science fiction that he started to beam it back as part of his reports to his home world. So each issue of the magazine was supposed to be one of these field reports, which we'd intercepted and printed up. Sure, it was a cornball gimmick -- but it worked!

== Anthology ==
In 1988 Absolute Entertainment, Inc. released an 80-page anthology called Aboriginal Science Fiction 1988 Annual Anthology which contained twelve stories from earlier issues of the magazine.

== Publishers ==
The magazine was published out of Woburn, Massachusetts by

- Aboriginal SF, October 1986 - May 1987
- Absolute Entertainment, Inc., July 1987 - July 1991
- The Second Renaissance Foundation, December 1991 - 2001

== Illustrators ==
Among the many illustrators for this magazine was filmmaker Larry Blamire.

== See also ==
- List of defunct American periodicals
