= Science Fiction Chronicle =

American magazine (1979–2006)

- Cover of Issue #101
- Editor: Andrew I. Porter for most of its run
- Frequency: Monthly / bimonthly
- Publisher: Algol Press (until 2000); DNA Publications
- Founded: October 1979; 46 years ago
- First issue: October 1979
- Final issue Number: June 2006; 20 years ago 267
- Country: United States
- Based in: Radford, Virginia
- Language: English
- ISSN: 0195-5365 (print); 1930-3858 (web)
- OCLC: 5509898

Science Fiction Chronicle (SFC]) was an American science fiction magazine (or "semiprozine") published from 1979 to 2006. During its last four years, its title was shortened to Chronicle.

== History ==
Science Fiction Chronicle was founded, and initially owned and published, by Andrew I. Porter, originally as a section of Porter's older fanzine Algol, appearing there first in 1978. SFC became an independent publication in October 1979. The magazine was first published monthly, then bimonthly, then monthly again, though its publication became irregular for its final few issues. The magazine's circulation reached its highest point around 2001, with over 10,000 copies per issue. It had various subtitles such as "the Monthly SF and Fantasy News Magazine" and "SF, Fantasy and Horror's Monthly Trade Journal".

Porter sold SFC to DNA Publications in May 2000 and was fired from it in 2002 (which led to "swirling rumors" in the science fiction circles); his final issue was #226, July 2002.

From around the same time (issue #228, September 2002), until its final few issues (issue #265, December 2005/January 2006), the magazine was renamed Chronicle, ostensibly to avoid confusion with the San Francisco Chronicle. Its last issue was #267 in June 2006.

== Editors ==
Porter was also the initial editor of the magazine for about two decades, until 2002. According to ISFDb, from 2001 to 2006 the editor of Chronicle was Warren Lapine; SFE instead lists later editors as (from #229, October 2002) John R. Douglas and (from #257, April 2005) Ian Randal Strock.

== Content ==
SFC published literary criticism, news on authors, artists, events and publishing, information related to fandom, interviews related to the genre (including, among others, Michael Kandel, Michael Swanwick and George Zebrowski), information on the science fiction literary market, convention reports, and fiction.

Its contributors included Vincent Di Fate, Jo Fletcher, Harris Lentz III, Frederik Pohl, Jeff Rovin and Robert Silverberg.

== Reception ==
Gardner Dozois described it as "not quite as vital as Locus" but "also full of interesting information". Peter Nicholls and David Langford also remarked that its "coverage was not as broad" as that of Locus; although it also covered some other topics. They noted that it was "something of an East Coast institution" and that it "offered an alternative voice for the sf community".

In Issue 32 of Abyss, Dave Nalle noted "What SFC has to distinguish it is a rather nice line on the intrigues of publishing, and short but consistently on-target book reviews." However, Nalle also pointed out editorial problems, including, "an amateurish editorial attitude, a nauseating orientation towards the lowest common denominators of SF fandom, annoying convention reports, and trouble keeping up with its [publication] schedule." Nalle also rated the actual amount of content only 2 out of 10, commenting, "On the whole there are actually less than a dozen pages of densely printed text [out of 42] in an issue of SNC." Nalle concluded by giving it an overall rating of 4 out of 10, saying, "The price is reasonable, and SFC is different enough ... that you might find it worth looking into."

== Awards received ==
Porter received a Special Award at the Worldcon in 1991 for his "years of continuing excellence" in editing Science Fiction Chronicle. The magazine was nominated for the Hugo Award for Best Semiprozine numerous times, winning the award twice (consecutively in 1993 and 1994).

== SF Chronicle Award ==
From 1982 to 1998 SFC presented an award for achievements in the field of science fiction, in a number of categories. It was based on a reader's poll, similar to the Locus Award. Sources discussing the award refer to it variously as: the SF Chronicle Award, the Science Fiction Chronicle Readers Poll or the Science Fiction Chronicle Reader Award.

Some of the categories and awards given included:

Novel

- 1982 Gene Wolfe: The Claw of the Conciliator
- 1983 Gene Wolfe: The Sword of the Lictor
- 1984 Tim Powers: The Anubis Gates
- 1985 William Gibson: Neuromancer
- 1986 Orson Scott Card: Ender's Game
- 1987 Orson Scott Card: Speaker for the Dead
- 1988 Gene Wolfe: The Urth of the New Sun
- 1989 C. J. Cherryh: Cyteen
- 1990 George Alec Effinger: A Fire in the Sun
- 1991 Dan Simmons: The Fall of Hyperion
- 1992 Michael Swanwick: Stations of the Tide
- 1993 Vernor Vinge: A Fire Upon the Deep
- 1994 Greg Bear: Moving Mars
- 1995 Michael Bishop: Brittle Innings
- 1996 Neal Stephenson: The Diamond Age
- 1997 Bruce Sterling: Holy Fire
- 1998 Dan Simmons: The Rise of Endymion

Novella

- 1982 Phyllis Eisenstein: In the Western Tradition
- 1983 Joanna Russ: Souls
- 1984 Michael Bishop: Her Habiline Husband
- 1985 John Varley: PRESS ENTER[]
- 1986 James Tiptree, Jr.: The Only Neat Thing to Do
- 1987 Lucius Shepard: R&R
- 1988 Robert Silverberg: The Secret Sharer
- 1989 Connie Willis: The Last of the Winnebagos
- 1990 Lois McMaster Bujold: The Mountains of Mourning
- 1991 Mike Resnick: Bully!
- 1992 Nancy Kress: Beggars in Spain
- 1993 Lucius Shepard: Barnacle Bill the Spacer
- 1994 Jack Cady: The Night We Buried Road Dog
- 1995 Mike Resnick: Seven Views of Olduvai Gorge
- 1996 Mike Resnick & Susan Shwartz: Bibi
- 1997 Gregory Benford: Immersion
- 1998 Allen Steele: …Where Angels Fear to Tread

Novelette

- 1982 Michael Swanwick: Mummer Kiss
- 1983 Connie Willis: Fire Watch
- 1984 Kim Stanley Robinson: Black Air
- 1985 Octavia E. Butler: Bloodchild
- 1986 George R. R. Martin: Portraits of His Children
- 1987 Lucius Shepard: Aymara
- 1988 Octavia E. Butler: The Evening and the Morning and the Night
- 1989 George Alec Effinger: Schrödinger's Kitten
- 1990 Mike Resnick: For I Have Touched the Sky
- 1991 Mike Resnick: The Manamouki
- 1992 Ray Aldridge: Gate of Faces
- 1993 Susan Shwartz: Suppose They Gave a Peace...
- 1994 Nancy Kress: The Battle of Long Island
- 1995 Greg Egan: Cocoon
- 1996 James Patrick Kelly: Think Like a Dinosaur
- 1997 Bruce Sterling: Bicycle Repairman
- 1998 Stephen Baxter: Moon Six

Short Story

- 1982 John Varley: The Pusher
- 1983 Greg Bear: Petra
- 1984 Gardner Dozois: The Peacemaker
- 1985 Lucius Shepard: Salvador
- 1986 James P. Blaylock: Paper Dragons
- 1987 Pat Cadigan: Pretty Boy Crossover
- 1988 Carol Emshwiller: The Circular Library of Stones
- 1989 Mike Resnick: Kirinyaga
- 1990 Bruce Sterling: Dori Bangs
- 1991 Terry Bisson: Bears Discover Fire
- 1992 Kim Stanley Robinson: Vinland the Dream
- 1993 Connie Willis: Even the Queen
- 1994 Connie Willis: Death on the Nile
- 1995 Joe Haldeman: None So Blind
- 1996 Michael A. Burstein: TeleAbsence
- 1997 James White: Un-Birthday Boy
- 1998 Robert J. Sawyer: The Hand You're Dealt

Dramatic Presentation

- 1982 Raiders of the Lost Ark
- 1983 Blade Runner
- 1984 Return of the Jedi
- 1985 2010
- 1986 Back to the Future
- 1987 Aliens
- 1988 The Princess Bride
- 1989 Who Framed Roger Rabbit
- 1990 Field of Dreams
- 1991 Total Recall
- 1992 Terminator 2: Judgement Day
- 1993 Aladdin
- 1994 Jurassic Park
- 1995 The Mask
- 1996 Babylon 5: "The Coming of Shadows"
- 1997 Star Trek: Deep Space Nine: "Trials and Tribble-ations"
- 1998 Contact
