= Mike Resnick bibliography =

List of works by Mike Resnick, a science fiction writer from the United States

List of works by American science fiction author Mike Resnick.

== Series ==
=== Birthright Universe ===
Most of Mike Resnick's science fiction novels and series fit into an overarching future history, the Birthright universe. In the Birthright universe, 2908 A.D. is 1 G.E. (Galactic Era). The stories in the mosaic novels Birthright: The Book of Man (1982) and Ivory (1988) are set throughout this timeline.

List of stories in the Birthright Universe
Title	Publication date	In-universe date	Era	Notes
"The Hunter"	1988-09	1885 A.D.	n/a	Part of the novel Ivory
"Himself"	1988-09	1898 A.D.	n/a	Part of the novel Ivory
Sideshow	1982-10	1982 A.D.	n/a	Tales of the Galactic Midway, book 1
The Three-Legged Hootch Dancer	1983-02	1983 A.D.	n/a	Tales of the Galactic Midway, book 2
The Wild Alien Tamer	1983-07	1985 A.D.	n/a	Tales of the Galactic Midway, book 3
The Best Rootin' Tootin' Shootin' Gunslinger in the Whole Damned Galaxy	1983-10	1987 A.D.	n/a	Tales of the Galactic Midway, book 4
"The Politician"	1988-09	2057 A.D.	n/a	Part of the novel Ivory
"Shaka II"	2009-12	2403 A.D.	n/a	First published as a standalone novella by PS Publishing
"The Curator"	1988-09	16 G.E.	Republic	Part of the novel Ivory
"The Homecoming"	2011-04	103 G.E.	Republic	First published in Asimov's Science Fiction, April-May 2011
"The Pioneers"	1982-02	264 G.E.	Republic	Part of the novel Birthright: The Book of Man
"The Cartographers"	1982-02	332 G.E.	Republic	Part of the novel Birthright: The Book of Man
Walpurgis III	1982-06	346 G.E.	Republic	Standalone novel
Eros Ascending	1984-03	367 G.E.	Republic	Tales of the Velvet Comet, book 1
"The Miners"	1982-02	396 G.E.	Republic	Part of the novel Birthright: The Book of Man
Eros at Zenith	1984-10	401 G.E.	Republic	Tales of the Velvet Comet, book 2
Eros Descending	1985-12	442 G.E.	Republic	Tales of the Velvet Comet, book 3
Eros at Nadir	1986-09	465 G.E.	Republic	Tales of the Velvet Comet, book 4
"All the Things You Are"	2006-10	522 G.E.	Republic	First published in Jim Baen's Universe, October 2006
"The Psychologists"	1982-02	588 G.E.	Republic	Part of the novel Birthright: The Book of Man
A Miracle of Rare Design	1994-12	616 G.E.	Republic	Standalone novel
"The Potentate"	1988-09	882 G.E.	Republic	Part of the novel Ivory
"The Merchants"	1982-02	962 G.E.	Republic	Part of the novel Birthright: The Book of Man
"Cobbling Together a Solution"	2004-10	1150 G.E.	Republic	First published in Amazing Stories, October 2004
"Nowhere in Particular"	2005-01	1151 G.E.	Republic	First published in Amazing Stories, January 2005
"The God Biz"	2008-01	1152 G.E.	Republic	First published in "Voice For the Cure", White Rocket Books, January 2008
"Keepsakes"	2004-08	1394 G.E.	Republic	First published in Between Worlds
"The Artist"	1988-09	1701 G.E.	Republic	Part of the novel Ivory
Paradise	1989-05	1813-1902 G.E.	Republic	Chronicles of Distant Worlds, book 1
Purgatory	1993-03	1826 G.E.	Republic	Chronicles of Distant Worlds, book 2
Inferno	1993-12	1921 G.E.	Republic	Chronicles of Distant Worlds, book 3
Starship: Mutiny	2005-09	1966 G.E.	Republic	Starship, book 1
Starship: Pirate	2006-12	1967 G.E.	Republic	Starship, book 2
Starship: Mercenary	2007-12	1968 G.E.	Republic	Starship, book 3
Starship: Rebel	2008-12	1969 G.E.	Republic	Starship, book 4
Starship: Flagship	2009-12	1970 G.E.	Republic	Starship, book 5
"The 43 Antarean Dynasties"	1997-12	2122 G.E.	Democracy	First published in Asimov's Science Fiction, December 1997. Hugo Award winner.
"The Diplomats"	1982-02	2154 G.E.	Democracy	Part of the novel Birthright: The Book of Man
"Monuments of Flesh and Stone"	2007-06	2239 G.E.	Democracy	First published in Visual Journeys: A Tribute to Space Artists
"The Olympians"	1982-02	2275 G.E.	Democracy	Part of the novel Birthright: The Book of Man
"The Barristers"	1982-02	2469 G.E.	Democracy	Part of the novel Birthright: The Book of Man
"Robots Don't Cry"	2003-07	2885 G.E.	Democracy	First published in Asimov's Science Fiction, July 2003
"The Medics"	1982-02	2911 G.E.	Democracy	Part of the novel Birthright: The Book of Man
"The Politicians"	1982-02	3004 G.E.	Democracy	Part of the novel Birthright: The Book of Man
"The Gambler"	1988-09	3042 G.E.	Democracy	Part of the novel Ivory
Santiago: a Myth of the Far Future	1986-03	3286 G.E.	Democracy	Santiago, book 1
A Hunger in the Soul	1998-05	3322 G.E.	Democracy	Standalone novel
The Soul Eater	1981-10	3324 G.E.	Democracy	Standalone novel
"Nicobar Lane: The Soul Eater's Story"	2002-03	3324 G.E.	Democracy	First published in Oceans of Space
The Return of Santiago	2003-02	3407 G.E.	Democracy	Santiago, book 2
Soothsayer	1991-11	3427 G.E.	Democracy	Oracle, book 1
Oracle	1992-10	3441 G.E.	Democracy	Oracle, book 2
Prophet	1993-06	3447 G.E.	Democracy	Oracle, book 3
"Guardian Angel"	2005-05	3502 G.E.	Democracy	A Jake Masters story, first published in Down These Dark Spaceways, collected in Masters of the Galaxy
"A Locked-Planet Mystery"	2007-04	3504 G.E.	Democracy	A Jake Masters story, first published in Alien Crimes, collected in Masters of the Galaxy
"Honorable Enemies"	2008-04	3504 G.E.	Democracy	A Jake Masters story, first published in Jim Baen's Universe, April 2008, collected in Masters of the Galaxy
"If the Frame Fits..."	2009-10	3505 G.E.	Democracy	A Jake Masters story, first published in Jim Baen's Universe, October 2009, collected in Masters of the Galaxy
"Real Jake"	2012-08	3505 G.E.	Democracy	A Jake Masters story, original to the collection Masters of the Galaxy
"Hunting the Snark"	1999-12	3719 G.E.	Democracy	First published in Asimov's Science Fiction, December 1999
The Fortress in Orion	2014-12	4026 G.E.	Democracy	Dead Enders, book 1
The Prison in Antares	2015-12	4027 G.E.	Democracy	Dead Enders, book 2
The Castle in Cassiopeia	2017-08	4028 G.E.	Democracy	Dead Enders, book 3
"The Graverobber"	1988-09	4375 G.E.	Democracy	Part of the novel Ivory
"The Administrators"	1982-02	4822 G.E.	Oligarchy	Part of the novel Birthright: The Book of Man
The Dark Lady	1987-11	4839 G.E.	Oligarchy	Standalone novel
The Widowmaker	1996-08	5101 G.E.	Oligarchy	Widowmaker, book 1
The Widowmaker Reborn	1997-08	5103 G.E.	Oligarchy	Widowmaker, book 2
The Widowmaker Unleashed	1998-09	5106 G.E.	Oligarchy	Widowmaker, book 3
A Gathering of Widowmakers	2005-12	5108 G.E.	Oligarchy	Widowmaker, book 4
"The Media"	1982-02	5461 G.E.	Oligarchy	Part of the novel Birthright: The Book of Man
"The Artists"	1982-02	5492 G.E.	Oligarchy	Part of the novel Birthright: The Book of Man
"The Warlord"	1988-09	5521 G.E.	Oligarchy	Part of the novel Ivory
"The Thief"	1988-09	5730 G.E.	Oligarchy	Part of the novel Ivory
"The Biochemists"	1982-02	5655 G.E.	Oligarchy	Part of the novel Birthright: The Book of Man
"The Warlords"	1982-02	5912 G.E.	Oligarchy	Part of the novel Birthright: The Book of Man
"The Conspirators"	1982-02	5993 G.E.	Oligarchy	Part of the novel Birthright: The Book of Man
Ivory	1988-09	6304 G.E.	Monarchy	Part of the novel Ivory
"The Rulers"	1982-02	6321 G.E.	Monarchy	Part of the novel Birthright: The Book of Man
"The Symbiotics"	1982-02	6400 G.E.	Monarchy	Part of the novel Birthright: The Book of Man
"Catastrophe Baker and the Cold Equations"	2006-08	6521 G.E.	Monarchy	First published in Golden Age SF: Tales of a Bygone Future
The Outpost	2001-05	6523 G.E.	Monarchy	Standalone novel
"Catastrophe Baker and a Canticle for Leibowitz"	2009-07	6524 G.E.	Monarchy	First published in The New Space Opera 2
"The Philosophers"	1982-02	6599 G.E.	Monarchy	Part of the novel Birthright: The Book of Man
"The Architects"	1982-02	6746 G.E.	Monarchy	Part of the novel Birthright: The Book of Man
"The Collectors"	1982-02	6962 G.E.	Monarchy	Part of the novel Birthright: The Book of Man
"The Rebels"	1982-02	7019 G.E.	Monarchy	Part of the novel Birthright: The Book of Man
"The Archaeologists"	1982-02	16201 G.E.	Anarchy	Part of the novel Birthright: The Book of Man
"The Priests"	1982-02	16673 G.E.	Anarchy	Part of the novel Birthright: The Book of Man
"The Pacifists"	1982-02	16888 G.E.	Anarchy	Part of the novel Birthright: The Book of Man
"The Destroyers"	1982-02	17001 G.E.	Anarchy	Part of the novel Birthright: The Book of Man
"Seven Views of Olduvai Gorge"	1994-01	21703 G.E.	n/a	First published in The Magazine of Fantasy & Science Fiction, October-November 1994. Hugo Award winner.

=== The Chronicles of Lucifer Jones ===
A pulp fiction parody about the comic adventures of con-man and pretend preacher Lucifer Jones.

1. Adventures (1985)
2. Exploits (1993)
3. Encounters (1995)
4. Hazards (2009)
5. Voyages (2017)

=== Dreamscape Trilogy ===
1. The Master of Dreams (2019)
2. The Mistress of Illusions (2020)

=== Encounters ===
- Lady with an Alien: An Encounter with Leonardo Da Vinci (2005)
- A Club in Montmartre: An Encounter with Henri Toulouse-Lautrec (2006)
- World Behind the Door: An Encounter with Salvador Dali (2007)

=== Eli Paxton ===
1. Dog in the Manger (1997)
2. The Trojan Colt (2013)
3. Cat on a Cold Tin Roof (2014)

=== John Justin Mallory ===
Urban fantasy series about John Justin Mallory, a private detective drawn into a fantastical alternative New York.

1. Stalking the Unicorn (1987)
2. Stalking the Vampire (2008)
3. Stalking the Dragon (2009)
4. Stalking the Zombie (2012) (a collection of eight short stories)

=== Ganymede ===
1. The Goddess of Ganymede (1968)
2. Pursuit on Ganymede (1968)

=== Kirinyaga: A Fable of Utopia ===
A series of short stories set on Kirinyaga, an artificial utopian habitat based on the culture of the Kikuyu people. The original ten stories appeared as Kirinyaga in 1998 and the eleventh was issued as a standalone novella in 2008.

1. "One Perfect Morning, with Jackals" (1991)
2. "Kirinyaga" (1988) (Hugo Award winner)
3. "For I Have Touched the Sky" (1989)
4. "Bwana" (1990)
5. "The Manamouki" (1990) (Hugo Award winner)
6. "Song of a Dry River (1991)
7. "The Lotus and the Spear" (1992)
8. "A Little Knowledge" (1994)
9. "When the Old Gods Die" (1995)
10. "The Land of Nod" (1996)
11. "Kilimanjaro: A Fable of Utopia" (2008)

=== Weird West Tales ===
A steampunk western series.

1. The Buntline Special (2010)
2. The Doctor and the Kid (2011)
3. The Doctor and the Rough Rider (2012)
4. The Doctor and the Dinosaurs (2013)

== Stand-alone novels ==
- Redbeard (1969)
- Battlestar Galactica: Galactica Discovers Earth (1980) (with Glen A. Larson)
- The Branch (1984)
- Second Contact (1990)
- The Red Tape War (1991) (with Jack Chalker and George Alec Effinger)
- Lara Croft: The Amulet of Power (2003)
- Dragon America: Revolution (2005)
- The Cassandra Project (2012) (with Jack McDevitt)
- The Gods of Sagittarius (2017) (with Eric Flint)

== Collections ==
- Unauthorized Autobiographies (1984)
- Through Darkest Resnick With Gun and Camera (1990)
- Stalking the Wild Resnick (1991)
- Pink Elephants and Hairy Toads (1991)
- Bwana & Bully! (1991)
- The Alien Heart (1991)
- Will the Last Person to Leave the Planet Please Shut Off the Sun? (1992)
- Solo Flights Through Shared Worlds (1996)
- An Alien Land (1998)
- A Safari of the Mind (1999)
- Magic Feathers: The Mike and Nick Show (2000) (with Nick DiChario)
- In Space No One Can Hear You Laugh (2000)
- Hunting the Snark and Other Short Novels (2002)
- With a Little Help From My Friends (2002)
- New Dreams for Old (2006)
- The Other Teddy Roosevelts (2008)
- Dreamwish Beasts and Snarks (2009)
- Blasphemy (2010)
- With a Little More Help From My Friends (2012)
- The Incarceration of Captain Nebula and Other Lost Futures (2012)
- Win Some, Lose Some (2012)
- Resnick's Menagerie (2012)
- First Person Peculiar (2014)
- Away Games (2014)
- Soulmates (with Lezli Robyn) (2016)
- The Hex Is In: The Fast Life and Fantastic Times of Harry the Book (a collection of fifteen short stories)

== Anthologies edited ==
- Shaggy B.E.M. Stories (1988)
- Alternate Presidents (1992)
- Alternate Kennedys (1992)
- Inside the Funhouse (1992)
- Aladdin: Master of the Lamp (with Martin H. Greenberg, 1992)
- Whatdunits (1992)
- More Whatdunits (1993)
- Alternate Warriors (1993)
- Future Earths: Under African Skies (with Gardner Dozois, 1993)
- Future Earths: Under South American Suns (with Gardner Dozois,1993)
- Christmas Ghosts (1993)
- Dinosaur Fantastic (with Martin H. Greenberg, 1993)
- By Any Other Fame (1994)
- Deals With the Devil (with Loren D. Estleman, 1994)
- Alternate Outlaws (1994)
- Alternate Worldcons (1994)
- Witch Fantastic (1995)
- Sherlock Holmes in Orbit (1995)
- Again, Alternate Worldcons (1996)
- Girls for the Slime God (1997)
- Alternate Tyrants (1997)
- Alternate Skiffy (1997)
- Return of the Dinosaurs (1997)
- Women Writing Science Fiction as Men (2003)
- Men Writing Science Fiction as Women (2003)
- Stars (with Janis Ian, 2003)
- New Voices in Science Fiction (2003)
- I, Alien (2005)
- Down These Dark Spaceways (2005)
- This is My Funniest (2006)
- Space Cadets (2006)
- The Worldcon Guest of Honor Speeches (with Joe Siclari, 2006)
- Alien Crimes (2007)
- Nebula Awards Showcase 2007 (2007)
- This is My Funniest 2 (2007)
- History Revisited (with J. David Markham, 2008)
- The Dragon Done It (with Eric Flint, 2008)
- The Best of Jim Baen's Universe #2 (with Eric Flint) (2008)
- When Diplomacy Fails (with Eric Flint, 2008)
- The Worlds of Edgar Rice Burroughs (with Bob Garcia, (2013)
- The Best of Galaxy's Edge (2014)
- INCI (with Tina Gower, 2015)
- When Parallel Lines Meet (with Lezli Robyn and Larry Hodges, 2017)

== Non-fiction books ==
- Putting It Together (2000)
- I Have This Nifty Idea (2001)
- Once a Fan... (2002)
- The Science Fiction Professional (2002)
- Resnick at Large (2003)
- ...Always a Fan (2009)
- The Business of Science Fiction (with Barry N. Malzberg) (2010)
- Resnick Abroad (2012)
- Resnick on the Loose (2012)
- Mike Resnick's Worldcons (2014)
- The Expanded and Updated Science Fiction Professional, Volume 1 (2016)
- The Expanded and Updated Science Fiction Professional, Volume 2 (2017)

== Short fiction ==
- "The Last Dog"
- "Blue"
- "Beachcomber"
- "Watching Marcia"
- "The Olympians"
- "Me and My Shadow"
- "The Fallen Angel"
- "God and Mr. Slatterman"
- "The Inn of the Hairy Toad"
- "Stalking the Unicorn with Gun and Camera"
- "The Toymaker and the General"
- "King of the Blue Planet"
- "Kirinyaga"
- "His Award-Winning Science Fiction Story"
- "Beibermann’s Soul"
- "Death is an Acquired Trait"
- "The Crack in the Cosmic Egg"
- "Inquiry Into the Auction of the U.S.A."
- "For I Have Touched the Sky"
- "Slice of Life"
- "Balance"
- "Bwana"
- "Neutral Ground"
- "How I Wrote the New Testament, Brought Forth the Renaissance, and Birdied the 17th Hole at Pebble Beach"
- "Was It Good For You, Too?"
- "The Manamouki"
- "One Perfect Morning, With Jackals"
- "Frankie the Spook"
- "Posttime in Pink"
- "Museum Piece"
- "Origins"
- "The Nine Lives of Isaac Intrepid" (with Lou Tabakow)
- "Pawns"
- "Bully!"
- "Excerpt from the Diary of Dr. Morris Finkelstein"
- "Song of a Dry River"
- "Winter Solstice"
- "A Little Night Music"
- "Monsters of the Midway"
- "The Bull Moose at Bay" (collected in his alternate history anthology "Alternate Presidents")
- "Mrs. Hood Unloads"
- "Over There"
- "Revolt of the Sugar Plum Fairies"
- "Classified"
- "Malish"
- "Trading Up" (with Barbara Delaplace)
- "Will the Last Person to Leave the Planet Please Shut off the Sun?"
- "Editor Meacham and the Fate Worse Than Death"
- "The Light That Blinds, the Claws That Catch"
- "The Lotus and the Spear"
- "The Pale Thin God"
- "Lady in Waiting" (collected in his anthology Alternate Kennedys)
- "The B Team"
- "Every Man a God" (with Barry N. Malzberg)
- "The Trials and Tribulations of Myron Blumberg, Dragon"
- "The Blue-Nosed Reindeer"
- "Mwalimu in the Squared Circle" (collected in his anthology "Alternate Generals")
- "Ghosts" (with Barry N. Malzberg)
- "Stop Press"
- "Stanley the Eighteen-Percenter"
- "Genesis: The Rejected Canon"
- "The Summer of my Discontent"
- "Super Acorns" (with Lawrence Schimel)
- "The Tarnished Diamond"
- "Birdie" (with Nick DiChario)
- "Barnaby in Exile"
- "A Little Knowledge"
- "Seven Views of Olduvai Gorge"
- "Alien Radio" (with Nick DiChario)
- "Pleasantly Pink" (with Nick DiChario)
- "The Adventure of the Pearly Gates"
- "Working Stiff" (with Nick DiChario)
- "My Girl"
- "The Kemosabee"
- "Metamorphosis"
- "The Most Beautiful Girl Alive" (with Nick DiChario)
- "Squonking" (with Nick DiChario)
- "The Sweet, Sad Love Song of Fred and Wilma" (with Nick DiChario)
- "The Shiksa" (with Lawrence Schimel)
- "How Jerry Phipps Won His Hugo"
- "disILLUSIONS" (with Lawrence Schimel)
- "When the Old Gods Die"
- "The Land of Nod"
- "Darker Than You Wrote"
- "Merdinus" (with Linda Dunn)
- "Heart of Stone" (with Lyn Nichols)
- "Mrs. Vamberry Takes a Trip"
- "Bibi" (with Susan Shwartz)
- "The Joy of Hats" (with Nick DiChario)
- "The Starving Children of Mars" (with Louise Rowder)
- "The Roosevelt Dispatches"
- "Card Shark"
- "The Gefilte Fish Girl"
- "My Brother’s Keeper" (with Jack Nimbersheim)
- "A Limerick History of Science Fiction"
- "Of Flame and Air" (with Josepha Sherman)
- "The Arrows of Godly Passion" (with Nick DiChario)
- "Sagittarius Rising" (with Ann Marston)
- "The Fighting 35th Last Stand at the Delores Proud Apple School for the Blind" (with Nick DiChario)
- "Fascinatin’ Rhythm" (with Nick DiChario)
- "The 43 Antarean Dynasties"
- "Stan" (with Ron Collins)
- "Me and Galahad" (with Adrienne Gormley)
- "Interview with the Almighty"
- "A Buzzard Named Rabinowitz"
- "Hothouse Flowers"
- "Why Martians are Attracted to Big-Breasted Women"
- "Hunting the Snark"
- "Full Circle" (with Kristine Kathryn Rusch)
- "Boot Hill" (with Catherine Asaro)
- "The Elephants on Neptune"
- "Redchapel"
- "Even Butterflies Can Sting"
- "Ocean’s Eleven" (with Tom Gerencer)
- "Nicobar Lane: The Soul Eater’s Story"
- "Old MacDonald Had a Farm"
- "Like Father, Like Son" (with B.J. Galler-Smith)
- "Like Small Feet Following" (with Robyn Herrington)
- "The Chinese Sandman"
- "Flower Children of Mars" (with M. Shayne Bell)
- "The Shackles of Freedom" (with Tobias S. Buckell)
- "The Demons of Jupiter’s Moons" (with Dean Wesley Smith)
- "Approaching Sixty" (with Barry N. Malzberg)
- "Water-Skiing Down the Styx" (with Janis Ian)
- "The Amorous Broom"
- "Reflections in Black Granite" (with Michael A. Burstein)
- "Dobchek: Lost in the Funhouse" (with Kay Kenyon)
- "Robots Don’t Cry"
- "The Burning Spear at Twilight" (2005, collected in Harry Turtledove's anthology Alternate Generals III)
- "Here’s Looking at You, Kid"
- "Unsafe at Any Speed"
- "Society’s Goy"
- "Swimming Upstream in the Wells of the Desert" (with Susan B. Matthews)
- "Travels with My Cats" (Hugo Award winner)
- "Me"
- "El Presidente"
- "Game Face" (with Robert Sheckley)
- "Keepsakes"
- "The Boy Who Cried ‘Dragon!’"
- "The Island of Annoyed Souls"
- "A Princess of Earth"
- "Cobbling Together a Solution"
- "Down Memory Lane"
- "Guardian Angel"
- "The One That Got Away"
- "A Muse with Burning Eyes" (with B. D. Faw)
- "Before the Beginning" (with Harry Turtledove)
- "Nowhere in Particular"
- "The God Biz"
- "The Hermit of the Skies" (with Paul Crilley)
- "Two Hunters in Manhattan"
- "Prevenge" (with Kevin J. Anderson)
- "Catastrophe Baker and the Cold Equations"
- "Harry, Larry, Barry & Frankie"
- "Occupational Hazard"
- "Great Unreported Breakthroughs #163"
- "A Small Skirmish in the Culture War" (with James Patrick Kelly)
- "Solomon’s Choice" (with Nancy Kress)
- "Distant Replay"
- "Jellyfish" (with David Gerrold)
- "All the Things You Are"
- "The Big Guy"
- "Visitor’s Night at Joey Chicago’s"
- "Chartreuse Mansions"
- "A Locked-Planet Mystery"
- "The Long and Short of It"
- "Shell Game"
- "Honorable Enemies"
- "Monuments in Flesh and Stone"
- "The Lost Continent of Moo"
- "Alastair Baffle’s Emporium of Wonders"
- "Carnival Knowledge"
- "Sluggo"
- "The Last Actor" (with Linda Donahue)
- "Merry Bunta!"
- "The Hex is In"
- "A Jaguar Never Changes Its Stripes"
- "A Better Mousetrap"
- "Christmas Eve at Harvey Wallbanger’s"
- "A Very Special Girl"
- "A Most Unusual Greyhound"
- "Not Quite Alone in the Dream Quarter" (with Pat Cadigan)
- "Snatch as Snatch Can"
- "Kilimanjaro"
- "Best in Show"
- "Connoisseurs"
- "Spring Training"
- "Inescapable"
- "A Four-Sided Triangle"
- "The Forgotten Kingdom"
- "Mother Scorpion’s House of Fallen Flowers"
- "Idle Roomer" (with Lezli Robyn)
- "The Paternal Flame"
- "Catastrophe Baker and a Canticle for Leibowitz"
- "Article of Faith"
- "A Very Formal Affair"
- "Soulmates" (with Lezli Robyn)
- "If the Frame Fits…"
- "Benchwarmer" (with Lezli Robyn)
- "Shame" (with Lezli Robyn)
- "Shaka II"
- "On Safari"
- "The Bride of Frankenstein"
- "Heads and Tails in Paradise"
- "Harboring Pearls"
- "The Blimp and Sixpence"
- "Report from the Field" (with Lezli Robyn)
- "The Homecoming"
- "The Foundling"
- "Weekdays"
- "The Close Shave" (with Lezli Robyn)
- "Royal Bloodlines"
- "Observation Post"
- "The Incarceration of Captain Nebula"
- "King and Mrs. Kong"
- "El and Al vs. Himmler's Horrendous Horde from Hell"
- "Six Blind Men and an Alien"
- "A Weighty Affair"
- "Dark Doings at the Field Museum of Natural Mystery"
- "The Second Civil War"
- "The Plantimal"
- "Bad News From the Vatican"
- "Incident on the Low Seas" (with John Kenny)
- "Treasure Island"
- "The Kid at Midnight"
- "Real Jake"
- "Making the Cut" (with Lezli Robyn)
- "Catastrophe Baker Makes First Contact"
- "Peacekeeper" (with Brad R. Torgersen)
- "Siren Song"
- "Guard Dog" (with Brad R. Torgersen)
- "Mooncakes" (with Laurie Tom)
- "A Holy War"
- "The Book of Eternity"
- "The Ascent" (with Brad R. Torgersen)
- "The Sacred Tree"
- "Stalking the Zombie"
- "The Hotel of the Suicides" (with Sabina Theo)
- "The Wizard of West 34th Street"
- "Siren Song"
- "The Things That Pearls Can Buy" (with Gio Clairval)
- "Hush, Little Baby, Don't You Cry" (with Brennan Harvey)
- "The Evening Line"
- "The Puce Whale"
- "Spirit Gun" (with Jordan Ellinger)
- "Tourist Trap" (with Barry Malzberg)
- "The Revealed Truth"
- "In the Tombs of the Martian Kings" (2013) in Old Mars (anthology)
- "The Hell-Bound Stagecoach"
- "The Enhancement"
- "A Beautiful Friendship" (with Lou J Berger)
- "The Godstone of Venus" (2015) in Old Venus (anthology)
- "Stella by Starlight" (with Robert T. Jeschonek)
- "Keep Your Head Up"
- "Tantaros"
- "Keeping Ahead"
- "Incident on Maple Street"
- "Five Times Better"
- "The Little Green Men Take Their Hideous Vengeance, Sort Of"
- "Long-Term Employment"
- "The Mermaid Club" (with Cat Rambo)
- "The Fastest Dragon"
- "Romeo and Julie"
- "Occult.net"
- "Pure Beauty and the Beast"
- "Queen's Robot Sacrifice" (with Jean-Claude Dunyach)
- "The Mayoral Stakes"
- "Hugs to Die For" (with Marina J. Lostetter)
- "Coach" (Avatarxprize)
- "The Great Manhattan Eat-Off"

== Editing ==
Mike and Carol Resnik were editors of the Resnick's Library of Worldwide Adventure, a non-fiction series collecting tales of travel from various authors, for Alexander Books.

- Tombs Travel and Trouble (Resnick's Library of Worldwide Adventure) (by Lawrence Griswold, with Mike Resnick, May 2001)
- Musk Hashish and Blood (Resnick's Library of Worldwide Adventure) (by Hector France, with Mike Resnick, June 2001)
- White Shadows in the South Seas (Resnick's Library of Worldwide Adventure) (by Frederick O'Brien, with Mike Resnick, October 2001)
- Mystic Isles of the South Seas (Resnick's Library of Worldwide Adventure) (by Frederick O'Brien, with Mike Resnick, April 2002)
- Green Hell (Resnick's Library of Worldwide Adventure) by Julian Duguid, with Mike Resnick, May 2002)

== Comics ==
- Conan the Barbarian plot for "The Fiend from the Forgotten City" (July 1974)
