= Deaths in April 2002 =

The following is a list of notable deaths in April 2002.

Entries for each day are listed alphabetically by surname. A typical entry lists information in the following sequence:

- Name, age, country of citizenship at birth, subsequent country of citizenship (if applicable), reason for notability, cause of death (if known), and reference.

== April 2002 ==
=== 1 ===
- Russell Awkard, 84, American baseball player.
- Carlos da Benta, 74, Portuguese Olympic rower (1948, 1952).
- Albert F. Canwell, 95, American politician and anti-communist.
- Tonino Cervi, 72, Italian film director, screenwriter and producer, heart attack.
- Simo Häyhä, 96, Finnish sniper during World War II.
- James Karales, 71, American photographer and photo-essayist.
- Étienne Martinetti, 61, Swiss Olympic wrestler (1972).
- K. V. Narayanaswamy, 78, Indian musician.
- John S. Samuel, 88, American Air Force general.

=== 2 ===
- Levi Celerio, 91, Filipino composer and lyricist, and National Artist of the Philippines.
- Vladimír Černík, 84, Czech-Egyptian tennis player.
- Ike Clarke, 87, English football player and manager.
- Casey Jones, 86, American politician and basketball player.
- Jack Kruschen, 80, Canadian actor (The Apartment, The War of the Worlds, Webster).
- Bill Marsh, 72, Australian rugby league footballer.
- Ron Nery, 67, American football player (Los Angeles/San Diego Chargers, Denver Broncos, Houston Oilers).
- John R. Pierce, 92, American engineer and author who coined the term "transistor", pneumonia.
- Betty Jane Rase, 74, American singer and songwriter, stroke.
- Henry Slesar, 74, American author, playwright, and copywriter.
- Shigeo Sugimoto, 75, Japanese football player.
- Robert Lawson Vaught, 75, American mathematician, and one of the founders of model theory.

=== 3 ===
- Heinz Drache, 79, German film actor, lung cancer.
- Fad Gadget, 45, English singer-songwriter, heart attack.
- Roy Huggins, 87, American novelist and television producer (Maverick, The Fugitive, The Rockford Files).
- Norm Lee, 81, Australian politician.
- Bobby Managoff, 84, Armenian-American professional wrestler, heart failure.
- Roy Nichols, 81, American baseball player (New York Giants).
- Ernst Stojaspal, 77, Austrian football player and Olympian (1948), heart failure.
- Karl Swanson, 101, American baseball player (Chicago White Sox).

=== 4 ===
- Leo Brooks, 54, American gridiron football player (University of Texas, Houston Oilers, St. Louis Cardinals), esophageal cancer.
- Endel Edasi, 72, Soviet Estonian Olympic swimmer (1952).
- Leo Laakso, 83, Finnish Olympic ski jumper (1948).
- Pierre Marchand, 62, French publisher, cancer.
- Joe Massot, 69, American writer and film director.
- Qazi Mujahidul Islam Qasmi, 66, Indian Mufti, Qadhi and Islamic scholar.
- Ken Stewart, 90, Canadian ice hockey player (Chicago Black Hawks).
- Jack Tanuan, 36, Filipino basketball player, kidney failure.
- Hiram Hamilton Ward, 78, American district judge (United States District Court for the Middle District of North Carolina).
- Charles Winquist, 57, American theologian.

=== 5 ===
- Herbert A. Cahn, 87, German-Swiss archaeologist, numismatist and antiquities-dealer.
- Paul Erickson, 86, American baseball player (Chicago Cubs, Philadelphia Phillies, New York Giants).
- Tore Johansson, 81, Swedish rower and Olympian (1952).
- Bargil Pixner, 81, Italian-American monk, biblical scholar and archaeologist.
- Sheriff Robinson, 80, American baseball player.
- Layne Staley, 34, American singer (Alice in Chains), drug overdose.
- Ben Warley, 65, American professional basketball player (Philadelphia 76ers, Baltimore Bullets, Anaheim Amigos), liver cancer.
- Kim Won-gyun, 85, North Korean composer and politician, heart failure.

=== 6 ===
- Silvia Derbez, 70, Mexican film and television actress, lung cancer.
- Petru Dumitriu, 77, Romanian novelist.
- Oliver Eggimann, 83, Swiss football player.
- Børge Gissel, 86, Danish Olympic cyclist (1948).
- Kevin Kelley, 59, American drummer (Rising Sons, The Byrds, Fever Tree).
- Ralph J. Marino, 74, American lawyer and politician from New York.
- Nobu McCarthy, 67, Canadian actress, aortic aneurysm.
- Martin Sperr, 57, German dramatist and actor.
- Tom Sunkel, 89, American baseball player (St. Louis Cardinals, New York Giants, Brooklyn Dodgers).
- Judith Wood, 95, American film actress.

=== 7 ===
- John Agar, 81, American actor, starred in Western and Sci-Fi movies, first husband of Shirley Temple, pulmonary emphysema.
- Bobby Astyr, 64, American pornographic film actor.
- Margit Leskinen, 87, Finnish Olympic swimmer (1948).
- Bhavanam Venkatarami Reddy, 70, Indian politician, chief minister of Andhra Pradesh.
- Georges van Coningsloo, 61, Belgian racing cyclist.
- Conny Vandenbos, 65, Dutch singer, lung cancer.
- Tony Zuzzio, 85, American football player (Detroit Lions).

=== 8 ===
- Nigel Bagnall, 75, British field marshal, professional head of the British Army (Chief of the General Staff).
- John Borton, 69, American football player (Ohio State Buckeyes, Cleveland Browns).
- María Félix, 88, Mexican film star, considered "the most beautiful face in the history of Mexican cinema", heart attack.
- Eloy Fominaya, 76, American composer, music educator, conductor, violinist and luthier (Augusta Symphony).
- Giacomo Mancini, 85, Italian politician.
- Harvey Quaytman, 64, American painter, cancer.
- Francisco Zamora Salinas, 63, El Salvador football player.
- Josef Svoboda, 81, Czech artist and scenic designer.
- Laurel Rose Willson, 60, American author and con artist.

=== 9 ===
- Dorothy Love Coates, 74, American gospel singer, considered one of gospel's great performers.
- Harold Coates, 84, Australian politician, member of the New South Wales Legislative Assembly (1965–1976).
- Thomas Dinger, 49, German drummer, singer and songwriter.
- Roy Dwight, 69, English footballer.
- Pat Flaherty, 76, American professional racecar driver, won the Indianapolis 500 in 1956.
- Weldon Irvine, 58, American composer, playwright, poet, and pianist, suicide by gunshot.
- Kazuo Nakamura, 75, Japanese-Canadian painter and sculptor.
- Leopold Vietoris, 110, Austrian mathematician, World War I veteran, and supercentenarian.

=== 10 ===
- Haim Cohn, 91, Israeli jurist and politician.
- Ed Fleming, 68, American professional basketball player (Niagara University, Rochester Royals, Minneapolis Lakers).
- Géza Hofi, 75, Hungarian humorist.
- Andrew Hogan, 78, Canadian politician and priest, member of the House of Commons of Canada (1974-1980).
- Þorsteinn Löve, 78, Icelandic Olympic discus thrower (1952).
- Atanda Fatai Williams, 83, Nigerian jurist and Chief Justice of Nigeria (1979–1983).

=== 11 ===
- Elmer Angsman, 76, American gridiron football player (Notre Dame, Chicago Cardinals) and football color commentator, heart attack.
- Branko Bauer, 81, Croatian film director.
- William Brandon, 87, American author, wrote on Native Americans and the American West.
- Bubba Brooks, 79, American jazz tenor saxophonist, a member of Bill Doggett's ensemble.
- Héctor Rojas Herazo, 81, Colombian novelist, poet, journalist and painter.
- Delphi Lawrence, 76, English actress.
- Do Mau, 85, Vietnamese officer in the Army of the Republic of Vietnam (ARVN).
- Lidia Barbieri Sacconaghi, 57, Italian Olympic alpine skier (1964).
- J. William Stanton, 78, American politician (U.S. Representative for Ohio's 11th congressional district).
- Stanley Weston, 82, American publisher, sportswriter, artist and photographer, cancer.

=== 12 ===
- Hans Neurath, 92, Austrian-American biochemist and academic.
- Gabriel Raksi, 63, Romanian football player.
- Yadollah Sahabi, 97, Iranian scholar, writer, reformist and politician.
- Kondapalli Seetharamaiah, 87, Indian communist leader, Parkinson's disease.
- George Shevelov, 93, Ukrainian scholar.
- Safet Zhulali, 59, Albanian Minister of Defence.

=== 13 ===
- Alex Baroni, 35, Italian singer, traffic accident.
- Scipio Colombo, 91, Italian dramatic baritone.
- Ivan Desny, 79, Russian-Swiss film actor-, appeared in more than 150 films, pneumonia.
- Joe Fisher, 85, Canadian ice hockey player (Detroit Red Wings).
- Franz Krienbühl, 73, Swiss Olympic speed skater (1968, 1976).
- Oreste Piccioni, 86, Italian-American physicist.
- Hal Picketts, 92, Canadian ice hockey player (New York Americans).
- Álvaro Salvadores, 73, Chilean-Spanish basketball player and Olympian (1952).
- Vlajko Stojiljković, 65, Serbian politician, suicide by gunshot.
- Desmond Titterington, 73, British racing driver from Northern Ireland.

=== 14 ===
- Edmée Abetel, 79, Swiss Olympic alpine skier (1952).
- Buck Baker, 83, American stock car race driver and member of the NASCAR Hall of Fame.
- Gustave Blouin, 89, Canadian politician and a member of Parliament (House of Commons).
- Zdeněk Chlup, 79, Czech Olympic basketball player (1948).
- Mark Ermler, 69, Russian conductor (Bolshoi Theatre, Moscow Philharmonic Orchestra, Seoul Philharmonic Orchestra).
- Joop Haex, 90, Dutch politician.
- Bobby Holm, 83, American basketball player.
- Michael Kerr, 81, British jurist.
- Monal, 21, Indian actress, suicide by hanging.
- Fausto Radici, 48, Italian alpine skier and Olympian (1976), suicide by gunshot.

=== 15 ===
- Sándor Gáspár, 85, Hungarian communist politician and trade unionist.
- Moe Keale, 62, American musician of Hawaiian music, and actor, heart attack.
- Dave King, 72, English comedian, actor and singer.
- Damon Knight, 79, American science fiction author, editor and critic.
- Hans-Henrik Krause, 84, Danish actor and film director.
- Clare Raglan, 74, Canadian ice hockey player (Detroit Red Wings, Chicago Black Hawks).
- Ram Singh Thakur, 87, Indian freedom fighter, musician and composer.
- Byron White, 84, American lawyer and Associate Justice of the Supreme Court of the United States, pneumonia.

=== 16 ===
- Billy Ayre, 49, English footballer, cancer.
- Ramiro de León Carpio, 60, Guatemalan politician, diabetic coma.
- Friðrik Guðmundsson, 76, Icelandic Olympic discus thrower (1952).
- Janusz Kasperczak, 74, Polish Olympic boxer (1948).
- Yevgeny Rasskazov, 60, Soviet Russian Olympic sports shooter (1964).
- Claudio Slon, 58, Brazilian jazz drummer, lung cancer.
- Marcel Stern, 80, Swiss competitive sailor and Olympic medalist (1948, 1952, 1968).
- Zoltán Turcsányi, 87, Hungarian Olympic field hockey player (1936).
- Robert Urich, 55, American actor (Vega$, Spenser: For Hire, Lonesome Dove, S.W.A.T.), cancer.
- Hugh Franklin Waters, 69, American judge (U.S. District Judge of the U.S. District Court for the Western District of Arkansas).
- Herbert Wernicke, 56, German opera director and set and costume designer.

=== 17 ===
- Urs-Ulrich Bucher, 75, Swiss Olympic sailor (1960, 1964).
- James Copeland, 83, Scottish actor (The 39 Steps, The Private Life of Sherlock Holmes).
- Betsy Curtis, 84, American science fiction and fantasy writer.
- Srul Irving Glick, 67, Canadian composer, radio producer, and conductor.
- Saeed Hanaei, 39-40, Iranian serial killer, hanged.
- Stevan Kragujević, 80, Serbian photojournalist and art photographer.
- Rune Öberg, 79, Swedish Olympic water polo player (1948).

=== 18 ===
- Mitsos Dimitriou, 54, Greek football player.
- Jerry Heidenreich, 52, American competition swimmer and Olympic champion (1972), suicide by drug overdose.
- Thor Heyerdahl, 87, Norwegian anthropologist, brain cancer.
- Wayne Hightower, 62, American basketball player, heart attack.
- Cy Laurie, 75, British musician.
- Wahoo McDaniel, 63, American gridiron football player and wrestler, complications from diabetes and kidney failure.

=== 19 ===
- William E. Barber, 82, U.S. Marine Corps colonel and Medal of Honor recipient, bone marrow cancer.
- Alberto Beltrán, 79, Mexican painter, engraver and political cartoonist.
- Jean-Pierre Destrumelle, 61, French football player and manager.
- Lennart Hemming, 69, Swedish footballer.
- Ruud Knuppe, 63, Dutch Olympic canoeist (1960).
- Reginald Rose, 81, American film and television writer, complications of heart failure.
- Ross Whicher, 84, Canadian politician and businessman (member of Parliament representing Bruce, Ontario).

=== 20 ===
- Phillip Baldwin, 77, American judge.
- Vlastimil Brodský, 81, Czech actor, suicide by gunshot.
- Alan Dale, 76, American singer ("Heart of My Heart", "Cherry Pink and Apple Blossom White").
- Joe Geri, 77, American gridiron football player (Pittsburgh Steelers, Chicago Cardinals).
- Sarvepalli Gopal, 78, Indian historian, renal failure.
- Stig-Göran Johansson, 58, Swedish ice hockey player and Olympian (1972).
- Pierre Rapsat, 53, Belgian singer-songwriter, cancer.

=== 21 ===
- Romana Calligaris, 77, Italian swimmer and Olympian (1952).
- Sam Dente, 79, American baseball player (Boston Red Sox, St. Louis Browns, Washington Senators, Chicago White Sox, Cleveland Indians).
- Thomas Joseph Grady, 87, American prelate of the Roman Catholic Church.
- Willie Holman, 57, American football player (Chicago Bears, Washington Redskins).
- Verné Lesche, 84, Finnish speed skater.
- Juan Carlos Mesías, 68, Uruguayan footballer.
- Mohammad Nabi Mohammadi, 65, Afghan politician and mujahideen leader.
- Red O'Quinn, 76, American professional football player (Wake Forest, Chicago Bears, Philadelphia Eagles).
- Ogden Phipps, 93, American stockbroker, thoroughbred horse racing owner/breeder and philanthropist.
- Józef Reszpondek, 51, Polish Olympic boxer (1972).
- Leo Roininen, 73, Canadian Olympic athlete (1948).
- Walter Siegfried, 83, Swiss Olympic boxer (1936).
- Harry Tarraway, 76, British Olympic middle-distance runner (1948).
- Terry Walsh, 62, British stuntman.

=== 22 ===
- Albrecht Becker, 95, German production designer and actor.
- Janet Fox, 89, American actress (Stage Door, Dinner at Eight).
- Soja Jovanović, 80, Serbian and Yugoslav film director.
- Linda Lovelace, 53, American porn star turned political activist, car crash.
- Fran Minkoff, 87, American lyricist.
- Allen Morris, 92, American historian.
- Christopher Price, 34, English journalist and presenter, meningoencephalitis.
- Victor Weisskopf, 93, Austrian-American theoretical physicist, worked on the Manhattan Project.

=== 23 ===
- Bob Baker, 75, American heavyweight boxer.
- Doris Batter, 73, English sprinter and Olympian (1948).
- Jim Cohen, 83, American baseball player.
- Bob Faught, 82, American professional basketball player (University of Notre Dame, Cleveland Rebels).
- Sam Francis, 88, American football player (Nebraska, Chicago Bears, Brooklyn Dodgers) and coach, and Olympic shot putter (1936).
- Pee Wee Jenkins, 79, American baseball player.
- Ted Kroll, 82, American professional golfer, won eight PGA Tour events, Parkinson's disease.
- Tibor Simon, 36, Hungarian football player and manager, blunt trauma.

=== 24 ===
- Gloria Escoffery, 78, Jamaican artist, poet, teacher, art critic and journalist.
- Barbara Grizzuti Harrison, 67, American journalist, essayist and memoirist, COPD.
- Jack Johnson, 77, Danish footballer.
- Douglas Mast, 58, US Virgin Island Olympic sports shooter (1972).
- Eric McKitrick, 82, American historian.
- Robert McQueeney, 83, American actor.
- Lucien Wercollier, 93, Luxembourgish sculptor.
- Nadezhda Zhurkina, 81, Russian radio operator and gunner during World War II.

=== 25 ===
- Michael Bryant, 74, British actor (Mumsy, Nanny, Sonny and Girly, The Stone Tape, The Ruling Class, Gandhi).
- Mario Casilli, 71, American photographer.
- Indra Devi, 102, Russian "yoga teacher to the stars".
- Lisa "Left Eye" Lopes, 30, American singer and member of girl group TLC, car crash.
- Athanasios Papoulis, 81, Greek-American engineer and applied mathematician.

=== 26 ===
- Vincenzo Caianiello, 69, Italian jurist.
- Alton Coleman, 46, American convicted spree killer, execution by lethal injection.
- John Davis, 86, American baseball player (New York Giants).
- Alastair MacLeod, 77, British Olympic rower (1952).
- Jaroslav Papiernik, 50, Slovak Olympic handball player (1976).
- Del Sharbutt, 90, American radio announcer.
- Tore Svensson, 74, Swedish football goalkeeper and Olympian (1952).
- Steve Tshwete, 63, South African politician and activist, pneumonia and liver failure.

=== 27 ===
- Guila Bustabo, 86, American concert violinist.
- George Alec Effinger, 55, American science fiction writer (When Gravity Fails, "Schrödinger's Kitten").
- Ruth Handler, 85, American businesswoman and inventor of the Barbie doll, colorectal cancer.
- Robert L. Joseph, 79, American theatre producer, playwright, and screenwriter.
- Arthur Owen, 87, British racing driver.
- Joseph Rego-Costa, 82, American soccer player and Olympian (1948).
- Hans Heinrich Thyssen-Bornemisza, 81, German Industrialist and art collector, cardiovascular disease.
- Felix Villars, 81, Swiss-American emeritus professor of physics at MIT.
- Jerry Witte, 86, American baseball player (St. Louis Browns).

=== 28 ===
- Albert Béchard, 79, Canadian politician and a member of Parliament (House of Commons for Bonaventure, Quebec).
- Robert M. Gagné, 85, American educational psychologist.
- Konrad Grilec, 92, Slovenian Olympic gymnast (1936, 1948).
- Alexander Lebed, 52, Russian general and politician, aviation accident.
- Alex Obeysekere, 84, Sri Lankan boxer and Olympian (1948).
- Ken Panfil, 71, American football player (Los Angeles Rams, Chicago/St. Louis Cardinals).
- Peter Parker, 77, British businessman.
- Liu Qiong, 88, Chinese film director and actor, liver cancer.
- Lou Thesz, 86, American professional wrestler, complications caused by triple bypass surgery.
- John Wilkinson, 82, American sound mixer (Platoon, Saturday Night Fever, Days of Heaven), Oscar winner (1987).
- Gordon Willey, 89, American anthropologist, known for creation of the field of "settlement pattern studies".

=== 29 ===
- Bob Akin, 66, American businessman and professional race car driver (two-time Sebring winner).
- Sune Andersson, 81, Swedish football player, manager, and Olympian (1948).
- Sverre Bratland, 84, Norwegian military leader and commander during the invasion of Normandy during World War II.
- Michael Camille, 44, English art historian, specializing in art of the European Middle Ages, brain tumor.
- Henri Caron, 77, French Olympic racewalker (1948).
- Noel DaCosta, 72, Nigerian-Jamaican composer, jazz violinist, and choral conductor.
- Santiago Álvarez Gómez, 89, Spanish communist politician.
- Ihar Hermianchuk, 41, Belarusian journalist and political activist, cancer.
- Pete Jacobsen, 51, English jazz pianist.
- Stan Lynn, 73, English football player.
- Lor Tok, 88, Thai comedian and actor.

=== 30 ===
- Kathryn Albertson, 93, American philanthropist.
- Howard Alvin Crum, 79, American botanist, expert on North American bryoflora.
- Ida Engel, 98, American actress, television commercial star in her 90s.
- Leslie Melville, 100, Australian economist, academic and public servant.
- Robert Mosley, 74 or 75, American bass-baritone.
- Nitsa Tsaganea, 100, Greek actress of theatre and film.
- Charlotte von Mahlsdorf, 74, German LGBT writer and museum director, heart attack.
