= Circuit's Edge =

1990 video game

- Cover art
- Developer: Westwood Associates
- Publisher: Infocom
- Platform: MS-DOS
- Release: 1990
- Genres: Interactive fiction, role-playing
- Mode: Single-player

Circuit's Edge is a video game developed by Westwood Associates and released by Infocom in 1990. It is based on George Alec Effinger's 1987 novel When Gravity Fails. The game is a hybrid interactive fiction/role-playing video game; it contains a window of text, a graphic window for depiction of the player's current location, and various menus and mini-windows for character statistics and other game functions.

== Plot ==
The player assumes the role of Marîd Audran, a private detective. The game is set in "The Budayeen", an entertainment/criminal quarter in an unnamed city somewhere in the Middle East that is based on New Orleans. While running a series of errands/"business deals" for "Saied the Half-Hajj", a friend of Marîd's, Marîd is framed for the murder of a man named Kenji Carter. Although Marîd's influential patron Friedlander Bey clears him with the local police, Bey asks him to look into Carter's death. Doing so leads Marîd deep into the criminal underworld of the Budayeen.

Effinger's novel When Gravity Fails was the first in a series of three "Marîd Audran" books (followed by 1989's A Fire in the Sun and 1991's The Exile Kiss); Circuit's Edge takes place between the first and second novel.

== Reception ==
Jim Trunzo reviewed Circuit's Edge in White Wolf #22 (Aug./Sept., 1990), rating it a 4 out of 5 and stated that "One thing is certainL once you begin to play Circuit's Edge, you'll keep going back to the streets of Budayeen, where life is never boring and death never far away."

The editors of Game Player's PC Strategy Guide presented the game with their 1990 "Best PC Graphic Adventure Game" award. They wrote, "An intelligent, literate, and thoroughly compelling sci-fi role-playing game, Circuit's Edge is the best cyberpunk game yet released."
