= Craig Mullins =

American painter

Craig Mullins is an American digital painter, and leading international concept artist. He has created art for books, video games and films. He is often considered to be a pioneer in the field of digital painting, painting digitally for many years before drawing tablets were available.

== Biography ==
Craig Mullins was born in 1964 in California and moved to Ohio at the age of three. When he was 18 he went back to California, where for several years he lived in the proximity of Los Angeles. He went to Pitzer College in Claremont, California, for two years, then studied at Art Center College of Design to study product design and illustration. He started out as a transportation designer and got a job at Ford in Detroit. There he discovered his design sense was a little bit too extreme for the car industry, so he returned to Art Center to study illustration and earned his BFA in 1990. Since then, he has worked on many projects as concept artist, illustrator, and matte painter. Mullins realized that the digital era freed him from all geographical constraints so he moved to Hawaii.

He stated that he is trying to stay in as many areas of illustration as possible. His works are inspired by John Singer Sargent and Frank Frazetta.

Mullins has illustrated cards for the Magic: The Gathering collectible card game. He has also been invited to many seminars around the world, such as China, and is also highly respected by Chinese artists such as Su Lin, a concept artist residing there.

== Work ==
=== In books ===
He did book covers for the following books:

- When Gravity Fails (2005 Orb edition)
- A Fire in the Sun (2005 Orb edition)
- The Exile Kiss (2005 Orb edition)
- Halo Encyclopedia
- Caturdays.. The Beginning (2005 Orb edition)
- Caturdays.. The End (2005 Orb edition)
- BioShock: Rapture (2011)
- Murder of Souls (2011)

=== In film ===
He did matte paintings and concept art for these movies:

- The Matrix Revolutions
- Armageddon
- Flubber
- Contact
- Apollo 13
- Interview with the Vampire
- Final Fantasy: The Spirits Within
- Forrest Gump
- Jurassic Park
- Tangled
- Spider-Man: Into the Spider-Verse
- Alien

=== In video games ===
He did illustrations and concept art for the following videogames:

- BioShock 2
- Marathon
- Marathon 2: Durandal
- Marathon Infinity
- Myth II: Soulblighter
- Halo: Combat Evolved
- Halo 2
- Call of Duty: Black Ops III
- Age of Empires: Definitive Edition
- Age of Empires II: Definitive Edition
- Age of Empires III
- Age of Empires III: Definitive Edition
- Age of Empires IV
- Need For Speed Series
- Oni
- Return to Castle Wolfenstein
- Europa Universalis III
- The Elder Scrolls IV: Oblivion
- Fallout 3
- Mass Effect 2
- Assassin's Creed: Brotherhood
- Call of Cthulhu: Dark Corners of the Earth
- Dragon's Dogma
- Crusader Kings III
- World of Warcraft

== Publications ==
- Expose 1 by Ballistic Publishing Art of Halo
