= Nebula Awards Showcase 2006 =

2006 anthology edited by Gardner Dozois

- Cover of first edition
- Editor: Gardner Dozois
- Cover artist: Ginger Legato
- Language: English
- Series: Nebula Awards Showcase
- Genre: Science fiction
- Publisher: Roc/New American Library
- Publication date: 2006
- Publication place: United States
- Media type: Print (hardcover)
- Pages: 372 pp.
- ISBN: 0-451-46064-2
- Preceded by: Nebula Awards Showcase 2005
- Followed by: Nebula Awards Showcase 2007

Nebula Awards Showcase 2006 is an anthology of award-winning science fiction short works edited by Gardner Dozois. It was first published in trade paperback by Roc/New American Library in March 2006, which also issued an ebook edition in July 2009.

== Summary ==
The book collects pieces that won or were nominated for the Nebula Awards for best novel, novella, novelette and short story for the year 2005, a profile of 2005 grand master winner Anne McCaffrey and a representative early story by her, various other nonfiction pieces related to the awards, mostly by past Nebula Grand Masters, and the two Rhysling Award-winning poems for 2004, together with an introduction by the editor. Not all nominees for the various awards are included, and the best novel is represented by an excerpt.

== Contents ==
- "Introduction" (Gardner Dozois)
- "The Green Leopard Plague" [Best Novella winner, 2005] (Walter Jon Williams)
- "Basement Magic" [Best Novelette winner, 2005] (Ellen Klages)
- "Dry Bones" [Best Novelette nominee, 2005] (William Sanders)
- "The Masters Speak: Introduction" (Gardner Dozois)
  - "Science Fiction Century" (Jack Williamson)
  - "The Way It Was" (Robert Silverberg)
  - "Teaching the Art" (Ursula K. Le Guin)
  - "Change and Okay In All Around I See" (Brian W. Aldiss)
  - "Then and Now" (Frederik Pohl)
- "The Voluntary State" [Best Novelette nominee, 2005] (Christopher Rowe)
- "Grand Master Anne McCaffrey: An Appreciation" (Jody Lynn Nye)
- "The Ship Who Sang" (Anne McCaffrey)
- "Coming to Terms" [Best Short Story winner, 2005] (Eileen Gunn)
- "Embracing-the-New" [Best Short Story nominee, 2005] (Benjamin Rosenbaum)
- Paladin of Souls [Best Novel, 2005 (excerpt)] (Lois McMaster Bujold)
- "Zora and the Zombie" [Best Novelette nominee, 2005] (Andy Duncan)
- "Film: The Year in Review" (Kathi Maio)
- "Travels with My Cats" [Best Short Story nominee, 2005] (Mike Resnick)
- "Just Distance" [Rhysling Award for Short Poem winner, 2004] (Roger Dutcher)
- "Octavia is Lost in the Hall of Masks" [Rhysling Award for Long Poem winner, 2004] (Theodora Goss)
- "The Cookie Monster" [Best Novella nominee, 2005] (Vernor Vinge)

== Reception ==
Dave Itzkoff in The New York Times Book Review finds an overall theme of nostalgia in the anthology, observing in it "a parade of inner children, undigested, intact and fully liberated from the authors whose psyches once sheltered them." He sees the Rowe story, which he cites as "the speculative work possessing the year's most striking literary imagery", as metaphorically "an extremely potent representation of the science-fiction and fantasy community's complicated relationship with the idea of nostalgia". He singles out for particular mention the stories by Klages, Sanders, McCaffrey ("[e]very bit as potent as when it first appeared in 1961"), Vinge and Rosenbaum ("[t]he best piece of writing, by light years, in the 'Nebula' collection"). He also notes the "unrepentantly nostalgic essays" of the past grand masters' essays in "The Masters Speak" section.

The anthology was also reviewed by Gary K. Wolfe (2006) in Locus no. 543, April 2006.
