= Budayeen Nights =

- Cover of first edition (Golden Gryphon Press, 2003)
- Author: George Alec Effinger; Barbara Hambly (foreword)
- Cover artist: John Picacio
- Language: English
- Genre: Science fiction (cyberpunk) short stories/novelettes
- Publisher: Golden Gryphon Press
- Publication date: September 2003
- Publication place: United States
- Media type: Print (hardback & paperback)
- Pages: 235
- ISBN: 1-930846-19-3 (first edition)
- OCLC: 51511199
- Dewey Decimal: 813.54
- LC Class: PS3555.F4B83

Budayeen Nights is a collection of cyberpunk science fiction short stories and novelettes by George Alec Effinger, published in 2003. The work consists of nine individual stories by Effinger, with a foreword and story introductions by Barbara Hambly. Seven of the nine stories had been published previously in other forms, such as magazines, while one consists of the first two chapters of Word of Night, which was to be the fourth book in the Marîd Audran series, following The Exile Kiss.

Budayeen Nights was published posthumously; Effinger having died in April 2002. The paperback edition was released in September 2008.

== List of stories ==
Most of the stories in Budayeen Nights had been previously published in magazines and fiction anthologies, but the book includes two previously unpublished works of Effinger's.

- "The City on the Sand", originally published in The Magazine of Fantasy and Science Fiction, April 1973
- "King of the Cyber Rifles", originally published in Isaac Asimov's Science Fiction Magazine, Mid-December 1987
- "Marîd and the Trail of Blood", originally published in Sisters of the Night, 1995: ISBN 0-446-67143-6
- "Marîd Changes His Mind", originally published in Isaac Asimov's Science Fiction Magazine, May 1989
- "Marîd Throws a Party", previously unpublished, this was to be the first two chapters of Word of Night
- "The Plastic Pasha", previously unpublished
- "Schrödinger's Kitten", originally published in Omni, September 1988
- "Slow, Slow Burn", originally published in Playboy, May 1988
- "The World as We Know It", originally published in Futurecrime, 1992: ISBN 1-55611-312-9
