= Full measure =

Full measure or Full Measure may refer to:

- "Full Measure" (Breaking Bad), a 2010 episode of Breaking Bad
- Full measure (mathematics), a set whose complement is of measure zero
- Full Measure (TV series), a 2015 series hosted by Sharyl Attkisson
- Full Measure, a 1929 novel by Hans Otto Storm
- "Full Measure", a 1966 song by the Lovin' Spoonful from Hums of the Lovin' Spoonful
- Full Measure, a 2014 novel by T. Jefferson Parker

== See also ==
- The Last Full Measure (disambiguation)
