= Eloy Fominaya =

American classical composer (1925–2002)

Eloy Fominaya (10 June 1925 – 8 April 2002) was an American contemporary composer, music educator at the collegiate level, conductor, violinist, and, as of 1985, a luthier.

Fominaya was born in New York City. His obituary in The Augusta Chronicle stated that had been a child prodigy in music. Fominaya played the violin for Eleanor Roosevelt at the White House before the age of ten and, by the age of 15, performed Felix Mendelssohn's Violin Concerto in D with the National Symphony Orchestra in Washington, D.C.

Beginning 1966, Fominaya served as chair of the Fine Arts Department at Augusta State University for 16 years. In total, Fominaya served 33 years at Augusta State University, teaching violin, composition, contemporary harmony/humanities and counterpoint. He retired as a Professor of Music at age 70.

Fominaya was an associate conductor of the Augusta Symphony and played violin in the orchestra. He was musical director and conductor of the Augusta Chorale Society for 12 years. He was director of the Augusta Youth Orchestra from 1966 to 1994.

Fominaya died in Augusta, Georgia.

== Academic positions ==
- Associate Professor of Music, University of Louisiana at Monroe
- 1966–1997 — Various teaching positions, including Chairman, Music Department, Augusta College, Georgia

== Education ==
- 1950 — Bachelor of Music (violin & music education) Lawrence University, Wisconsin
- Feb 1953 — Master of Music (major – composition; minor – violin), University of North Texas (studied composition with Violet Archer)
- 1963 — Doctor of Philosophy in Music, Michigan State University
- Studied at Juilliard for 3 years
- Studied with master violin maker, Albert Ferdinand Moglie (1890–1988)
- 1951 — Studied at Baylor University
