= Dirk O. Meyer =

German conductor

Dirk Meyer is a German conductor active in the United States of America since 2002.

== Current position ==
Meyer is currently music director of the Augusta Symphony Orchestra in Georgia and the Duluth Superior Symphony Orchestra in Minnesota. In addition he serves as music director of the Lyric Opera of the North (LOON). Previously Meyer served as principal guest conductor of the Sarasota Orchestra in Florida, where he also served as assistant and associate conductor and music director of the Sarasota Youth Orchestras. He appears frequently as guest conductor throughout North America, having worked with orchestras like the Phoenix Symphony, Symphoria in Syracuse, NY, and the Toronto and Edmonton Symphony Orchestras in Canada. In 2012 Meyer was awarded the "American Prize" for professional conductors.

== Former positions ==
Prior to these appointments Meyer held music director positions with the Mason Symphony and the Art Nouveau Chamber Orchestra (MI) and assistant positions with the Traverse Symphony (MI) and Missouri Symphony Orchestra.

== Specialization ==
An advocate for 'new music', Meyer is actively involved in the promotion of new music through performance and commissioning of new compositions.

== Publications ==
He is also the author of Chamber Orchestra and Ensemble Repertoire. A Catalog of Modern Music (Scarecrow Press, 2011).
