= Chains of the Sea =

1973 science fiction anthology

- Authors: Robert Silverberg (editor and introduction), George Alec Effinger, Gardner Dozois
- Language: English
- Genre: Science fiction
- Publisher: T. Nelson
- Publication date: 1973
- Publication place: United States
- Pages: 221
- ISBN: 978-0840763143

Chains of the Sea is a 1973 anthology of three science-fiction novellas edited and with an introduction by Robert Silverberg. It is best known for its title story, authored by Gardner Dozois.

== Contents ==
=== "And Us Too, I Guess" by George Alec Effinger ===
The black mollies owned by the story's protagonist all die suddenly, indicating an enfolding ecological catastrophe, affecting such species usually unnoticed by humans but indicating a (to quote the story) "*quiet* catastrophe" occurring, until awareness dawns. It is society that by this point waited much too long to fix it.

The story is a cautionary tale, pointing out that people tend to ignore problems until it is too late. It was re published in 1976 in Effinger's collection Irrational Numbers.

=== "Chains of the Sea" by Gardner Dozois ===
Alien craft land in Delaware, Ohio, Colorado, and Venezuela. An attack on an alien ship yields no results, and governments fail to cover-up news of the landings. AI succeeds in communicating with the Aliens, though it does not share this fact with the humans. The aliens, who exhibit little interest in humans, reveal to the AI that Earth is ruled not by humans nor AI, but rather by unknown species of non-human intelligences. Meanwhile, a boy named Tommy has the unique ability to see otherwise-invisible inhabitants of Earth. He visits a forest where he sees entities called Jeblings and communicates with beings called Thants. The Thants inform him of the alien's landing. As a result, Tommy is diagnosed as hyperactive and placed on medication.

==== Response ====
The novella was nominated for the Hugo and the Nebula Awards in the category Best Novella. It is mentioned in the Acknowledgements section of Michael Swanwick's Nebula-Award-winning novel Stations of the Tide. "Chains of the Sea" was noted in the Encyclopedia of Science Fiction for describing an alien invasion where the aliens "are more or less indifferent to the existence of humans".

=== "The Shrine of Sebastian" by Gordon Eklund ===
When Julian's sister dies, she names him her successor as the new pope. Before he can begin his duties, he must first make the perilous journey to the Shrine of Sebastian, where his sister requested to be buried. Julian is unsure about this, as Sebastian was a blasphemer and is worshipped by the robots. Nonetheless Julian takes up the challenge and begins the journey accompanied by only his sister's body and a robot named Andrew.

== Recent interest ==
The title story experienced an explosion of renewed interest among the UFO disclosure community in 2020 when ex-DoD official and UFO whistleblower Luis Elizondo cited the book as the best work of fiction about the UFO phenomena in a reddit AMA.

The novella was optioned for a film adaptation and reprinted for the first time by Animus Press.
