= The Last Full Measure =

The Last Full Measure may refer to:

- The Last Full Measure (novel), a 1998 novel by Jeffrey Shaara
- The Last Full Measure (2004 film), a short film written and directed by Alexandra Kerry
- The Last Full Measure (2019 film), a war drama film by Todd Robinson
- "The Last Full Measure" (short story), a short story by George Alec Effinger
- Last Full Measure (Star Trek novel), a 2006 Star Trek: Enterprise relaunch novel
- The Last Full Measure (album), a 2016 album by Swedish metal band Civil War

== See also ==
- The Gettysburg Address, a speech by US President Abraham Lincoln which uses the words "the last full measure"
