= Ivory: A Legend of Past and Future =

1988 book by Mike Resnick

- First edition cover (publ. by Tor Books)
- Author: Mike Resnick
- Genre: Science fiction
- Publisher: Tor Books
- Publication date: September 1, 1988
- ISBN: 978-0-312-93093-6

Ivory: A Legend of Past and Future is a science fiction novel (or a novel-like series of vignettes) by American writer Mike Resnick, published in 1988. Set in Resnick's Birthright Universe, it describes the fictional past and future history of the (real) Kilimanjaro Tusks and those who own them.

== Plot summary ==
Duncan Rojas, a detective-like researcher, is hired by Bukoba Mandaka, the last of the Maasai people (and one of richest persons in the galaxy), to find the famous Kilimanjaro Tusks. Fragments of the history of the tusks and their owners are established by Rojas's research in future internet-like databases and are presented in the form of a series of vignettes.

== Reception ==
Ivory received mostly positive reviews from critics. Publishers Weekly described it as "a romantic vision of human destiny". Frances Bonner of Foundation criticized its prose and characterization as "simplistic" and "juvenile". Bryan Thomas Schmidt praised the novel's succinct and simple writing style, while noting that it "runs long". It was a finalist for the Nebula and Clarke awards.
