= Nebula Awards Showcase 2005 =

Science fiction anthology

- Cover of first edition
- Editor: Jack Dann
- Cover artist: Ray Lundgren
- Language: English
- Series: Nebula Awards Showcase
- Genre: Science fiction
- Publisher: Roc/New American Library
- Publication date: 2005
- Publication place: United States
- Media type: Print (paperback)
- Pages: 328
- ISBN: 0-451-46015-4
- OCLC: 58045829
- Preceded by: Nebula Awards Showcase 2004
- Followed by: Nebula Awards Showcase 2006

Nebula Awards Showcase 2005 is an anthology of award-winning science fiction short works edited by American writer Jack Dann. It was first published in trade paperback by Roc/New American Library in March 2005.

== Summary ==
The book collects pieces that won or were nominated in the Nebula Awards for best novel, novella, novelette and short story categories for the year 2004, profiles of 2004 grand master winner Robert Silverberg and 2004 Author Emeritus Charles L. Harness, with representative early stories by both, various other nonfiction pieces related to the awards, and the two Rhysling Award-winning poems for 2003, together with an introduction by the editor. Not all nominees for the various awards are included, and the best novella and best novel are represented by excerpts.

== Contents ==
- "Introduction" (Jack Dann)
- "The Mask of the Rex" [Best Novelette nominee, 2004] (Richard Bowes)
- "The Last of the O-Forms" [Best Short Story nominee, 2004] (James Van Pelt)
- "Movements in Science Fiction and Fantasy: A Symposium"
  - "Introduction" (Jack Dann)
  - "Deep in the Heart of the State of the Art" [essay] (Bruce Sterling)
  - "New Weird" [essay] (China Miéville)
  - "The New Space Opera" [essay] (Paul McAuley)
  - "The Interstitial Arts Foundation" [essay] (Ellen Kushner)
  - "The Romantic Underground: An Exploration of a Nonexistent and Self-Denying Nonmovement" [essay] (Jeff VanderMeer)
- "Grandma" [Best Short Story nominee, 2004] (Carol Emshwiller)
- "Grand Master Robert Silverberg: The Stochastic Writer" [essay] (Barry N. Malzberg)
- "Sundance" [short story] (Robert Silverberg)
- "Lambing Season" [Best Short Story nominee, 2004] (Molly Gloss)
- "0wnz0red" [Best Novelette nominee, 2004] (Cory Doctorow)
- "Film: The Year in Review" [essay] (Lucius Shepard)
- "Knapsack Poems" [Best Short Story nominee, 2004] (Eleanor Arnason)
- Coraline (excerpt) [Best Novella winner, 2004] (Neil Gaiman)
- "What I Didn't See" [Best Short Story winner, 2004] (Karen Joy Fowler)
- "Tripping with the Alchemist" [essay] (Barry N. Malzberg)
- "Author Emeritus Charles L. Harness: Wielder of Light" [essay] (George Zebrowski)
- "Quarks at Appomattox" [short story] (Charles L. Harness)
- "Of a Sweet Slow Dance in the Wake of Temporary Dogs" [Best Novelette nominee, 2004] (Adam-Troy Castro)
- "Potherb Gardening" [Rhysling Award for Short Poem winner, 2003] (Ruth Berman)
- "Epochs in Exile: A Fantasy Trilogy" [Rhysling Award for Long Poem winner, 2003] (Charles Saplak) and (Mike Allen)
- "Goodbye to All That" [Best Short Story nominee, 2004] (Harlan Ellison)
- "The Story Behind the Book: A Personal View" [essay] (Elizabeth Moon)
- The Speed of Dark (excerpt) [Best Novel winner, 2004] (Elizabeth Moon)
- "The Empire of Ice Cream" [Best Novelette winner, 2004] (Jeffrey Ford)

== Reception ==
Kirkus Reviews calls the book "another for the fan's bookshelf." After surveying the contents it notes that it "attempts to give a broader picture of the current state of SF" through its conclusion of the film summary, the Rhysling winners and "provocative essays by participants in several current movements in the field." The editor's introduction and story notes are called "knowledgable (sic), graceful and to the point."

Publishers Weekly Notes that the anthology "presents the usual quality mix of literary SF and fantasy with critical essays," briefly noting the contributors and highlighting Shepard's "provocative, witty movie survey."

Carl Hays, writing in Booklist, notes that "[a]ny collection of Nebula winners can be counted on to present the genre's finest literary artisans," and "[t]he 2005 Showcase is no exception." He lists as "[s]tandouts among these standouts" the pieces by Fowler and Doctorow, and also calls attention to the "quintet of insightful essays" and the editor's introductory comments, that "add depth to a superior collection."

Don D'Ammassa in Chronicle feels the anthology is "[n]ot really a best of the year, but contains many of the best stories of the year," stating that with it "[t]he venerable Nebula Awards collection [series] adds another fine book to its resume, mixing some of the best fiction of the past year with several good essays relevant to the field.

The anthology was also reviewed by Sandra Lindow in SFRA Review #263-4, Gary K. Wolfe in Locus, #507, April 2003, and Patrick J. Swenson in Talebones #26, Summer 2003.
