= The Outpost (Resnick novel) =

2001 novel by Mike Resnick

- First edition cover
- Author: Mike Resnick
- Cover artist: Bob Warner
- Language: English
- Series: Birthright Universe
- Genre: Science fiction
- Publisher: Tor Books
- Publication date: May 2001
- Publication place: United States
- Media type: Print (Hardcover)
- Pages: 383 (first edition, hardback)
- ISBN: 0-312-85485-4 (first edition, hardback)
- OCLC: 45879523
- Dewey Decimal: 813/.54 21
- LC Class: PS3568.E698 O98 2001

The Outpost is a science fiction novel by American writer Mike Resnick, first published as hardback by Tor Books in May 2001, followed by paperback edition in August 2002. It is a satirical anthology centered on a tavern called the Outpost on the planet Henry II at the edge of the galaxy, in the neutral territory known as the Inner Frontier where fighting is forbidden. It attracts legendary characters who, while drinking and relaxing, share stories of their lives.

== Summary ==
The novel is divided into 3 sections: Legend, Fact, and History. In Legend, the characters tell stories of what they were doing before they arrived and about people they met and things they did. The storytelling is interrupted by an alien invasion of the system, to which the heroes react. The History section sees everyone gathered back at the Outpost to share their stories and find out the fates of the others.

=== Major themes ===
- Tall tales in the nature of Paul Bunyan and Pecos Bill, but set in the Wild West of the future.
- Religion in the form of monotheism and polytheism.
- Discussion of history as a set of facts vs. perceptions.

=== Stories told ===
- Catastrophe Baker and the Dragon Queen
- The Last Landship (Hellfire Carson)
- The Greatest Painting of All Time (Little Mike)
- The Short, Star-Crossed Career of Magic Adbul-Jordan (Big Red)
- When Iron-Arm McPherson Took the Mound (Big Red)
- The Night Bet-a-World O'Grady Met High-Stakes Eddie
- Catastrophe Baker and the Siren of Silverstrike

== Characters ==
- Tomahawk (Thomas Aloysius Hawke) - Owner of The Outpost
- Reggie - Robot bartender
- Catastrophe Baker - Living legend
- Hurricane Smith - hero with a weakness for alien females
- Three-Gun Max - Mutant gunfighter with 3 arms
- Big Red - Former professional star athlete (basketball, baseball, murderball)
- Nicodemus Mayflower -
- Bet-a-World O'Grady - Infamous gambler
- Sinderella -
- Little Mike Picasso (Michelangelo Gauguin Rembrandt van Gogh Rockwell Picasso (formerly Montgomery Quiggle))- Famous unknown artist
- Sahara Del Rio - Alien (Borovite)
- Reverend Billy Karma -
- Einstein - Deaf, blind, mute supragenius
- Argyle - Alien with color-changing skin, former accountant
- Gravedigger Gaines - Retired bounty hunter
- Willie the Bard - Historian and record-keeper for the Outpost
- Hellfire Van Winkle - (formerly Hellfire Carson) 5,000 year old former big-game hunter and safari guide
- Achmed of Alphar -
- Earth Mother - Retired madam
- Sitting Horse & Crazy Bull- Aliens (Velitas IV) who become members of the Great Sioux Nation
- Delilah Jones ("Clockwork Delilah") - Time-displaced con artist
