= Distant Replay =

- Short story by Mike Resnick
- Language: English
- Genre: Magic realism-slipstream

Publication
- Published in: Isaac Asimov's Science Fiction Magazine
- Publication type: Magazine
- Publication date: April/May 2007

"Distant Replay" is a magic realism/slipstream short story by American writer Mike Resnick, originally published in the April 2007 issue of the Isaac Asimov's Science Fiction Magazine. It was nominated for the 2008 Hugo Award for Best Short Story.

== Plot summary ==
The story follows Walter Silverman, a man who sees a young woman that looks exactly like his deceased wife. As he gets to know her he discovers that she has too many things in common for this to be a coincidence. He then comes up with a plan to help out her love life and manages to find his own Avatar for her to meet.
