= Nebula Awards Showcase 2007 =

2007 anthology edited by Mike Resnick

- Cover of first edition
- Editor: Mike Resnick
- Language: English
- Series: Nebula Awards Showcase
- Genre: Science fiction
- Publisher: Roc/New American Library
- Publication date: 2007
- Publication place: United States
- Media type: Print (paperback)
- Pages: 389 pp.
- ISBN: 0-451-46134-7
- Preceded by: Nebula Awards Showcase 2006
- Followed by: Nebula Awards Showcase 2008

Nebula Awards Showcase 2007 is an anthology of award winning science fiction short works edited by Mike Resnick. It was first published in trade paperback by Roc/New American Library in March 2007.

== Summary ==
The book collects pieces that won or were nominated for the Nebula Awards for best novel, novella, novelette and short story for the year 2006, a profile of 2006 Grand Master winner Harlan Ellison and a representative early story by him, various other nonfiction pieces and bibliographical material related to the awards, and the two Rhysling Award-winning poems for 2005, together with an introduction by the editor. Not all nominees for the various awards are included, and the best novel is represented by an excerpt.

== Contents ==
- "Introduction" (Mike Resnick)
- "About the Science Fiction and Fantasy Writers of America"
- "The 2006 Nebula Awards Final Ballot"
- "Honoring Andre: The Andre Norton Award" [essay] (Josepha Sherman)
- "Magic for Beginners" [Best Novella winner, 2006] (Kelly Link)
- "Short Fiction Round Table" [essay] (Ellen Datlow, Ben Bova, Bill Fawcett and Martin H. Greenberg)
- "I Live with You" [Best Short Story winner, 2006] (Carol Emshwiller)
- "Why Nebulas Matter" [essay] (Jack McDevitt)
- "The End of the World as We Know It" [Best Short Story nominee, 2006] (Dale Bailey)
- "Daring the Boundaries" [essay] (Catherine Asaro)
- "Still Life with Boobs" [Best Short Story nominee, 2006] (Anne Harris)
- "Whither Canadian SF & F?" [essay] (Robert J. Sawyer)
- "Identity Theft" [Best Novella nominee, 2006] (Robert J. Sawyer)
- "My Mother, Dancing" [Best Short Story nominee, 2006] (Nancy Kress)
- "To Boldly Go: A Strange, Beautiful Future for Genre Cover Art" [essay] (John Picacio)
- "The Mice that Roared" [essay] (Lou Anders)
- Camouflage (excerpt) [Best Novel winner, 2006] (Joe Haldeman)
- "Soul Searching" [Rhysling Award for Long Poem winner, 2005] (Tim Pratt)
- "No Ruined Lunar City" [Rhysling Award for Short Poem winner, 2005] (Greg Beatty)
- "Think Outside the Page" [essay] (Kevin J. Anderson)
- "The Faery Handbag" [Best Novelette winner, 2006] (Kelly Link)
- "Men Are Trouble" [Best Novelette nominee, 2006] (James Patrick Kelly)
- "Harlan Ellison: The Man in E Minor" [essay] (Barry N. Malzberg)
- "The Resurgence of Miss Ankle-Strap Wedgie" [novella] (Harlan Ellison)
- "About the Nebula Awards"
- "Past Nebula Award Winners"
- "Grand Master Award Winners"
- "The Authors Emeriti"

== Reception ==
Kristin Gray, writing in The Davis Enterprise, calls the anthology "a reminder that short fiction still thrives" and "a book to revisit time and again." Observing that it "contains both fiction and the best of the year's nonfiction articles about the genre," she highlights Picacio's survey of science-fiction art, an "aspect of the genre isn't often considered," and Anderson's "timely" essay on "the changing face of science fiction." She notes, however, that the book's "real draw is its fiction, and the contents are admirable. Every story here is outstanding." Her favorites are the pieces by Link, "the sort of story that, for just a moment, makes us believe in magic again," Sawyer, "thought-provoking and a fast-paced adventure," and "for sheer laughs," Harris.

The anthology was also reviewed by Dorman T. Shindler in Subterranean Online, Spring 2007.
