= The 43 Antarean Dynasties =

Short story by Mike Resnick

- Short story by Mike Resnick
- Country: United States
- Language: English
- Genre: Science fiction

Publication
- Published in: Asimov's Science Fiction
- Publication type: Magazine
- Publication date: December 1997
- Series: Birthright

"The 43 Antarean Dynasties" is a science fiction short story by American writer Mike Resnick, originally published in the December 1997 issue of Asimov's Science Fiction. It won the 1998 Hugo Award for Best Short Story. The story itself can be considered as a science fictional spin on the study of postcolonialism.

== Plot summary ==
Hermes, a native and cynical insectoid tour guide shows a family of three visiting humans around the capital city of his home planet Antares. As he escorts the three visitors around he is annoyed by their insensitive actions, especially as his fares refuse to feel sorry for the violence and destruction the previous human invasions have caused for Antareans, and saddened by what has become of his own culture.
