= When Gravity Fails =

1986 novel by George Alec Effinger

- First Edition
- Author: George Alec Effinger
- Cover artist: Craig Mullins
- Language: English
- Series: Marîd Audran series
- Genre: Science fiction, cyberpunk
- Publisher: Arbor House
- Publication date: January 1987
- Publication place: United States
- Media type: Print (hardback & paperback)
- ISBN: 0-87795-851-3
- OCLC: 13860315
- Dewey Decimal: 813/.54 19
- LC Class: PS3555.F4 W5 1987
- Followed by: A Fire in the Sun

When Gravity Fails is a cyberpunk science fiction novel by American writer George Alec Effinger, published in 1986. It was nominated for the Nebula Award for Best Novel in 1987 and the Hugo Award for Best Novel in 1988. The title is taken from "Just Like Tom Thumb's Blues", a song by Bob Dylan: "When your gravity fails and negativity don't pull you through".

Taking place in a futuristic Middle-Eastern setting, the series reverses some of the usual expectations of a future world order by painting the Western world in decline while Muslim countries seem to prosper. The book's other main themes are the effects of drug use and alternate personality technologies, as well as the personal interactions and increasing isolation of a flawed protagonist.

It is the first book in Effinger's "Marîd Audran" series, named after the protagonist, and was followed by A Fire in the Sun in 1989 and The Exile Kiss in 1991. Effinger started work on a fourth Audran novel, Word of Night, but died before that work was completed. The existing chapters of Word of Night are now available in the posthumously published Budayeen Nights, along with some other Budayeen and non-Budayeen short stories.

== Setting ==
=== Middle East ===
Effinger's novel, set near the end of the 22nd century, describes an ascendant Arabic/Muslim world, where the West has been in decline for at least a century. The United States, Europe and the Soviet Union are described as having fractured into many small states, squabbling amongst themselves for remnants of former glory, with their citizens often described as visiting the unnamed city of the novel's setting as bumbling, naive tourists in awe at the wonders of the Muslim world.

Later stories relate that the Muslim world itself is fractured politically, and that a major character in the series frequently manipulates political events in the Muslim world to enhance his own fortune and personal power.

In follow-up stories, a Mars colony is mentioned that "was a combined project of the Federated New England States of American, the new Fifth Reich, and the Fragrant Heavenly Empire of True Cathay".

The Islamic world shows much of the elements commonly associated with it, such as religious faith, intricate rituals of conduct and relationship, and tensions between ethnic groups.

=== Protagonist ===
The novel is told from the perspective of Marîd Audran, a young man from low origins (coming from the Maghreb, and being the son of an Algerian prostitute and a Frenchman), who is a small-scale operator and hustler in the Budayeen, the entertainment and criminal quarter of an unnamed Middle-Eastern city, probably somewhere in the Levant, based on several geographical references to other countries around the region.

Audran considers himself a freelance operator and is fiercely proud of his independence, both from others (including Friedlander Bey, the shadowy, paternalistic crime figure overseeing most of the Budayeen's business interests) and from cybernetic modification. Where most others have their brain "wired" for work or play, Audran's almost superstitious dread of this modification has prevented him from doing the same, and so he cannot use "daddies" (from "add-ons", software chips providing skills like languages or accounting) or "moddies" (modules that contain whole new personalities, for example, those of movie stars or fictional characters). He covers this shortcoming by personal charm, a certain arrogance, and excessive use of stimulants, opiates, and other drugs, to which he is effectively addicted.

Audran's claims of independence from everyone, often given in wry internal narration, are not fully factual either. He is very fond of many people in the Budayeen, from various prostitutes, barkeepers and other lowlifes of the ghetto to most especially Yasmin, his on-and-off girlfriend. The relationship with Yasmin, a trans woman now working as a (rather successful) prostitute, is especially volatile, with periods of mutual understanding and love being interrupted by vicious fights between the two.

== Plot synopsis ==
Cover of the 1988 Bantam Spectra paperback edition. Cover art by Jim Burns.

A series of brutal murders soon begins to panic the Budayeen, and Audran is almost executed by Friedlander Bey, who at first considers him to be the killer. He is then forced by the centuries-old Bey to become his investigator, and even worse, is made to subject himself to extensive, partly experimental cybernetic modifications; an advanced form of the brain wiring he has dreaded before.

While the killer or killers brutally begin wiping out witnesses as well as acquaintances of Audran, he tries to uncover clues to their nature and to the link between the seemingly unconnected victims. The killer uses "moddies" to make himself into one of the most feared and bestial serial killers of history.

After being accosted by and overpowering the modified killer — who had begun stalking Audran himself with sadistic glee and patience — he is not convinced that everything is over, and finds that an important middleman in the Budayeen was behind some of the murders. When he confronts him, he is almost killed himself, and facing death, has to insert a special "daddy" which makes him go into a bestial frenzy, killing the murderer. However, in his rage, he also slaughters a captured policeman and mutilates both bodies horribly.

The gruesome nature of his self-defense disgusts his former acquaintances in the Budayeen. Friedlander Bey, in the final move sealing Audran's fate, then forces him to become one of his lieutenants to serve as a new middleman between the Budayeen and the police. As a result, Audran is viewed with suspicion by everyone and ends the novel with practically no friends.

== The Budayeen Cycle ==
1. When Gravity Fails
2. Circuit's Edge (video game, Effinger and Westwood Associates)
3. A Fire in the Sun
4. The Exile Kiss
5. Word of Night (unfinished)
- Budayeen Nights (short story collection; includes beginning chapters of Word of Night)

== In other media ==
- The 1990 computer game Circuit's Edge's backstory is based upon When Gravity Fails. Specifically it is set between the events of When Gravity Fails and A Fire in the Sun.
- As of 2013, a film adaptation was in development by Sinister director Scott Derrickson and writer C. Robert Cargill. In a 2016 interview, Cargill announced on Double Toasted that the project was probably in turnaround.
- R. Talsorian Games created a 'Budayeen' supplement for their role-playing game Cyberpunk 2020 titled When Gravity Fails (1992). It is intended mainly for game masters who want to set campaigns in the Budayeen; there are no connections to the main game world.
