= Old MacDonald Had a Farm (short story) =

- Short story by Mike Resnick
- Country: United States
- Language: English
- Genre: Science fiction

Publication
- Published in: Asimov's Science Fiction
- Publication type: Magazine
- Publication date: September 2001

"Old MacDonald Had a Farm" is a science fiction short story by American writer Mike Resnick, published in 2001.

The story is about a reporter who visits a farm where millions of genetically engineered animals are raised to help alleviate the world's food shortage. What he finds there is both brilliantly wonderful and tragically disturbing.

"Old MacDonald Had a Farm" was finalist for the 2002 Hugo Award for Best Short Story.
