= Duluth Superior Symphony Orchestra =

The Duluth Superior Symphony Orchestra (DSSO) is an American orchestra based in Duluth, Minnesota. Founded in 1932 as the Duluth Civic Orchestra, it became the city's first permanent symphony orchestra. In 2000, it performed the North American premiere of Spring Symphony by Chinese composer Xiao-Gang Ye. Since 1966, the DSSO has performed at the Duluth Entertainment Convention Center (DECC) Auditorium and the St. Louis County Depot. The orchestra's season runs from September to May each year.

== History ==
The beginnings of the Duluth Civic Orchestra occurred in 1931 at the house of Alphin Flaaten, a professional music teacher. The first concert was on May 2, 1932, conducted by Walter Lange. Paul Lemay, principal violist and assistant conductor of the Minneapolis Symphony, became the first full-time conductor. The initial concerts took place at the Duluth Armory. In 1966, the orchestra moved to the DECC, seating over 2,200 with a waterfront location. In the 1974–75 season, the name of the orchestra was changed to Duluth Superior Symphony Orchestra to reflect the close relationship between the Twin Ports: Duluth and Superior, Wisconsin. As of 2013, its music director is Dirk Meyer.

== Music director ==
The 2013–2014 season is Dirk Meyer's first year as music director. Meyer conducted six concerts for the DSSO last year as the music director designate. In the past, Meyer has held positions with the Sarasota Orchestra in Florida, the Springfield Symphony, Naples Philharmonic and The Florida Orchestra.

== Concertmaster ==
Erin Aldridge has been DSSO's Concertmaster since 2005. She also maintains an active performance schedule as a soloist and a chamber musician. Aldridge attended Indiana University, University of Wisconsin-Milwaukee, and University of Wisconsin-Madison, earning her bachelor's degree in Violin Performance, Master's degree and Performer's Certificate in Chamber Music Performance, and her Doctor of Musical Arts degree in Violin Performance.

== Past music directors ==
- Dirk O. Meyer (2013–present)
- Markand Thakar (2001 - 2013)
- Yong-yan Hu (1995 - 2000)
- Taavo Virkhaus (1977 - 1994)
- Joseph Hawthorne (1967 - 1977)
- Hermann Herz (1950 - 1967)
- Joseph Wagner (1947 - 1950)
- Tauno Hannikainen (1942 - 1947)
- Paul Lemay (1932 - 1942)
