= Kirinyaga (short story) =

- Short story by Mike Resnick
- Country: United States
- Language: English
- Genre: Science fiction

Publication
- Published in: The Magazine of Fantasy & Science Fiction
- Publication type: Magazine
- Publication date: November 1988

"Kirinyaga" is a science fiction short story by American writer Mike Resnick, published in 1988; it is the first chapter in the book by the same name. The story was the winner of the 1989 Hugo Award for Best Short Story and the 1989 SF Chronicle Award. It was also nominated for the 1989 Nebula Award for Best Novelette as well as the 1989 Locus award.

== Plot summary ==
The story is set on Kirinyaga, an artificial orbital colony that recreates an African savannah environment. The protagonist is Koriba, the mundumugu (priest or shaman) of a Kikuyu tribe living there. Koriba was raised in the mainstream modern world and has several graduate degrees, but came to resent bitterly how "Western" ways displaced African traditions. Later, he led a group of Kikuyu colonists to Kirinyaga to recreate a traditional Kikuyu society. A generation later, the residents live as their pre-modern ancestors did, as illiterate subsistence farmers and herders, with no access to or even knowledge of the larger world. They follow Kikuyu traditions in everything, guided by Koriba, who is one of the last survivors of the founding group. Koriba has a hidden computer terminal and conducts all contact with Maintenance, the agency which operates the machinery that provides Kirinyaga's artificial environment and keeps its orbit stable.

Kikuyu tradition says that a child born feet first is a demon. Koriba kills such a child, causing a breach with Maintenance. Maintenance sends an investigator to see if they need to interfere with and regulate the Kikuyu traditions. Koriba is unbending in his insistence that Maintenance not interfere with Kikuyu traditions no matter how much they dislike them. In the end Maintenance informs Koriba that they will not tolerate the killing of infants. Koriba begins to train the young men of the tribe as warriors, in preparation for armed resistance to Maintenance.

== Creation ==
Kirinyaga was written as a submission for a planned anthology edited by Orson Scott Card, entitled ''Eutopia'', in which all stories would be about a group attempting to create a utopian society. Each story would be told from the perspective of a member of that society who believed in that idea of utopia. Resnick requested and received permission to submit the story to a magazine in addition to the anthology. The originally-planned anthology was never published.
