= George Alec Effinger =

American science fiction author (1947–2002)

- Born: January 10, 1947; Cleveland, Ohio
- Died: April 27, 2002 (aged 55); New Orleans, Louisiana
- Occupations: Novelist, short story writer
- Writing career
- Pen name: O. Niemand, Susan Doenim
- Genres: science fiction, cyberpunk
- Notable work: When Gravity Fails

George Alec Effinger (January 10, 1947 – April 27, 2002) was an American science fiction author, born in Cleveland, Ohio.

== Writing career ==
Effinger was born in Cleveland, Ohio, on January 10, 1947. His father was a United States Navy veteran and his mother was a prostitute; he grew up very poor.

He attended Yale University on a scholarship, but failed organic chemistry and dropped out of the pre-med program. He moved to New York City and began writing. His first wife, Diana, sometimes babysat for Damon Knight and Kate Wilhelm, a married couple who were both science fiction writers. He joined the Clarion Writers' Workshop which they sponsored.

Effinger's first three stories were published in the first Clarion anthology in 1971. The first was "The Eight-Thirty to Nine Slot" in Fantastic in 1971. During his early period, he also published under a variety of pseudonyms.

His first novel, What Entropy Means to Me (1972), was nominated for the Nebula Award. He achieved his greatest success with the trilogy of Marîd Audran novels set in the Middle East in the 22nd century, with cybernetic implants and modules allowing individuals to change their personalities or bodies. The novels are in fact set in a thinly veiled version of the French Quarter of New Orleans. The three published Audran novels were When Gravity Fails (1987), A Fire in the Sun (1989), and The Exile Kiss (1991); Effinger also contributed to the computer game Circuit's Edge (1990), based on When Gravity Fails. He began a fourth Budayeen novel, Word of Night, but completed only the first two chapters. Those two chapters were reprinted in the anthology Budayeen Nights (2003) which has all of Effinger's short material from the Marîd Audran setting.

His novelette "Schrödinger's Kitten" (1988) received both the Hugo and the Nebula Award, as well as the Japanese Seiun Award. A collection of his stories was published posthumously in 2005, entitled George Alec Effinger Live! From Planet Earth; includes the complete stories Effinger wrote under the pseudonym "O. Niemand" and many of Effinger's best-known stories. Each O. Niemand story is a pastiche in the voice of a different major American writer (Flannery O'Connor, Damon Runyon, Mark Twain, etc.), all set on the asteroid city of Springfield. "Niemand" is from the German word for "nobody", and the initial O was intended by Effinger as a visual pun for Zero, and possibly also as a reference to the author O. Henry.

Effinger also wrote a series of Maureen (Muffy) Birnbaum parodies, which placed a preppy into a variety of science fictional, fantasy, and horror scenarios.

He made brief forays into writing comic books in the early 1970s, mostly in Marvel Comics' science fiction, fantasy, and horror titles; and again in the late 1980s, including the first issue of a series of his own creation entitled Neil and Buzz in Space & Time, about two fictional astronauts who travel to the edge of the universe to find it contains nothing but an ocean planet with a replica of a small New Jersey town on its only island. The first issue was the only issue, and the story ended on a cliffhanger. It was released by Fantagraphics. He also wrote a story based in the Zork universe.

== Personal life ==
Effinger was known to close friends as "Piglet", a nickname from his youth which he later came to dislike.

Throughout his life Effinger suffered health problems. These caused enormous medical bills he could not pay, resulting in bankruptcy. Because Louisiana law descends from the Napoleonic Code rather than English Common Law, the possibility existed that copyrights to Effinger's works and characters might revert to his creditors, in this case the hospital. However, no representative of the hospital appeared at the bankruptcy hearing, and Effinger retained the rights to his intellectual property.

Effinger suffered about 70% hearing loss from childhood infections, but was helped by hearing aids for his last 10 years. He did not drive most of his life, and only got a driver's license around age 39 for check-cashing identification.

Effinger met his first wife Diana in the 1960s. He was married from the mid-1970s to the mid-1980s to artist Beverly K. Effinger, and from 1998 to 2000 to fellow science fiction author Barbara Hambly. He died in New Orleans, Louisiana in 2002.

== Works ==
Novels (non-series)

- What Entropy Means to Me (1972)
- Relatives (1973)
- Nightmare Blue (1975) (with Gardner Dozois)
- Felicia (1976)
- Those Gentle Voices: A Promethean Romance of the Spaceways (1976)
- Death in Florence (1978) (aka Utopia 3)
- Heroics (1979)
- The Wolves of Memory (1981)
- Shadow Money (1988)
- The Red Tape War (1990) (with Mike Resnick and Jack L. Chalker)
- The Zork Chronicles (1990)
- Look Away (1990) (novella)
- Schrödinger's Kitten (1992)
- Trinity: Hope Sacrifice Unity
- The League of Dragons: A Castle Falkenstein Novel (1998)

Nick of Time series

- The Nick of Time (1985)
- The Bird of Time (1986)

Marîd Audran series

- When Gravity Fails (1987)
- A Fire in the Sun (1989)
- The Exile Kiss (1991)
  - The Audran Sequence (omnibus)
- Budayeen Nights (short stories, 2003)

Planet of the Apes Television series adaptations

- Man the Fugitive (1974)
- Escape to Tomorrow (1975)
- Journey Into Terror (1975)
- Lord of the Apes (1976)

Collections

- Mixed Feelings (1974)
- Irrational Numbers (1976)
- Dirty Tricks (1978)
- Idle Pleasures (1983) (science fiction sports stories)
- Author's Choice Monthly Issue 1: The Old Funny Stuff (1989)
- Maureen Birnbaum, Barbarian Swordsperson (1993)
- George Alec Effinger Live! From Planet Earth (2005)
  - stories selected and introduced by friends, fellow writers and editors
- A Thousand Deaths (2007)
  - the novel The Wolves of Memory plus 7 additional Sandor Courane stories (6 uncollected)

Short stories

- "The First Step," (as John K. Diomede) Haunt of Horror (digest) #1 (Marvel, June 1973)
- "The Jewel in the Ash," (as John K. Diomede) Haunt of Horror (digest) #2 (Marvel, August 1973)
- "Heartstop," Haunt of Horror (magazine) #1 (Marvel, May 1974)
- "And Us, Too, I Guess" (novella) (collected in Chains of the Sea, published 1974)
- "Prince Pat" (1992) (collected in Mike Resnick's alternate history anthology Alternate Kennedys)
- "Albert Schweitzer and the Treasures of Atlantis" (1993) (collected in Mike Resnick's alternate history anthology Alternate Warriors)
- "Shootout at Gower Gulch" (1994) (collected in Mike Resnick's alternate history anthology Alternate Outlaws)
- "Mars: The Home Front" (1996)
- "The Last Full Measure"

Comics

- "Wasteland—on a Weirdling World" (featuring Gullivar Jones, Warrior of Mars), Creatures on the Loose #18 (Marvel, July 1972)
- "The Long Road to Nowhere" (featuring Gullivar Jones), Creatures on the Loose #19 (Marvel, September 1972)
- "Moon of Madness, Moon of Fear!", Chamber of Chills #1 (Marvel, November 1972)
- "What Price Victory?" (featuring Gullivar Jones), Creatures on the Loose #20 (Marvel, November 1972)
- "More Than Blood!", Journey into Mystery #2 (Marvel, December 1972)
- "Two Worlds to Win!" (featuring Gullivar Jones), Creatures on the Loose #21 (Marvel, January 1973)
- "All the Shapes of Fear!", Chamber of Chills #3 (Marvel, March 1973)
- "Thongor! Warrior of Lost Lemuria!" (featuring Thongor! Warrior of Lost Lemuria!), Creatures on the Loose #22 (Marvel, March 1973)
- "Where Broods the Demon!" (featuring Thongor), Creatures on the Loose #23 (Marvel, May 1973)
- "Red Swords, Black Wings!" (featuring Thongor), Creatures on the Loose #24 (Marvel, July 1973)
- "The Wizard of Lemuria!" (featuring Thongor), Creatures on the Loose #25 (Marvel, September 1973)
- "The Mouse Alone!" (featuring the Young Gray Mouser), Sword of Sorcery #5 (DC Comics, Nov.-Dec. 1973)
- "All the World Wars at Once!", Fantastic Four #161 (Marvel, August 1975) (credit is only for the title of the issue)
- "Neil & Buzz in Space and Time" #1 (Fantagraphics, April 1989)

Note: The titles of the first two books of the Marîd Audran series are both taken from Bob Dylan lyrics. "When Gravity Fails" is from the song "Just Like Tom Thumb's Blues" and "A Fire in the Sun" from "It's All Over Now, Baby Blue". Permission was denied to use a Dylan quote for the third book's title, so Effinger chose a public domain quote from Shakespeare.
