= Leo Laakso =

Finnish ski jumper

Leo Laakso (21 August 1918 in Heinola – 4 April 2002) was a Finnish ski jumper who competed in the 1940s. He finished 6th in the individual large hill competition at the 1948 Winter Olympics in St. Moritz.
