= Ida Engel =

American actress

- Born: July 20, 1903; Winnipeg, Manitoba, Canada
- Died: April 30, 2002 (aged 98); Los Angeles, California, United States
- Occupations: Actress, singer
- Spouse: Murray Engel (m. 1924)

Ida Engel (July 20, 1903 – April 30, 2002) was an American actress and singer.

Ida Engel was born in Winnipeg, Manitoba, Canada, to parents of Russian-Jewish descent. In 1907, at the age of 4, she moved to Los Angeles, California. Engel took up the piano at fifteen and then matriculated at UCLA.

In 1924, she married Murray Engel, a Czech immigrant.

In 1985, Engel appeared on The Gong Show, singing the song "Secondhand Rose". In her nineties, Engel landed herself a Hollywood agent. She would appear at bar mitzvahs, synagogues and senior citizen centres. In 1994, she appeared as herself in the movie Young at Hearts, a documentary about eight Los Angeles women who remain happy and young at heart.

Ida Engel became best known in commercials for Holiday Inn. A Generation X slacker in his thirties would make demands of his grandmother, played by Engel, and the grandmother would cachinnate, and ask, "What do you think this is, the Holiday Inn?"

Engel was a member of a choral group, The Chansonettes.

Engel died of natural causes at Cedars-Sinai Medical Center in Los Angeles, California on April 30, 2002.
