= Sideshow (novel) =

1982 novel by Mike Resnick

First edition (publ. Signet Books) Cover art by Don Punchatz

Sideshow is a novel by Mike Resnick published in 1982.

== Plot summary ==
Sideshow is a novel in which a carnival owner blackmails a company into performing on the interstellar circuit.

== Reception ==
Greg Costikyan reviewed Sideshow in Ares Magazine #14 and commented that "The intrusion of a human scale into a genre whose major appeal is its galactic scale is a tricky task to pull off, and few have done it successfully. Mike Resnick is one such writer."

== Reviews ==
- Review by Faren Miller (1982) in Locus, #262 November 1982
- Review by Tom Easton (1983) in Analog Science Fiction/Science Fact, May 1983
- Review by Algis Budrys (1983) in The Magazine of Fantasy & Science Fiction, May 1983
