= Seven Views of Olduvai Gorge =

Novella by Mike Resnick

Cover of first publication in The Magazine of Fantasy & Science Fiction.

"Seven Views of Olduvai Gorge" is a science fiction novella by American writer Mike Resnick, originally published in The Magazine of Fantasy & Science Fiction in 1994. It won the 1994 Nebula Award for Best Novella and the 1995 Hugo Award for Best Novella.

The story concerns an archaeological expedition sent to Earth after humanity's alleged extinction. The alien archaeologists sent there study humanity's rise and fall in the legendary home of its emergence in East Africa. In the course of the story the aliens learn about the cruelty and glory of human history. They also discover a surprise.
