= Lennart Hemming =

Swedish footballer

Personal information
- Date of birth: 13 May 1932
- Date of death: 19 April 2002 (aged 69)

International career
Years	Team	Apps	(Gls)
1963–1965	Sweden	4	(0)

Lennart Hemming (13 May 1932 – 19 April 2002) was a Swedish footballer. He played in four matches for the Sweden men's national football team from 1963 to 1965.

Hemming represented Motala AIF and AIK.
