= The Soul Eater =

1981 novel by Mike Resnick

Cover of the first edition, published by Signet Books. Art by Paul Alexander.

The Soul Eater is a science fiction novel by American writer Mike Resnick, published in 1981.

== Plot summary ==
The Soul Eater is a novel in which professional hunter Nicobar Lane becomes obsessed with pursuing the roaming Dreamwish Beast through space.

== Reception ==
Greg Costikyan reviewed The Soul Eater in Ares Magazine #13 and commented that "it's well-written enough action for SF. It is, if you will, mindless fun, and recommended for aficionados thereof."

== Reviews ==
- Review by Richard E. Geis (1982) in Science Fiction Review, Spring 1982
- Review by Wayne Cogell (1982) in Science Fiction & Fantasy Book Review, #3, April 1982
- Review by Baird Searles (1982) in Isaac Asimov's Science Fiction Magazine, May 1982
- Review by Tom Easton (1982) in Analog Science Fiction/Science Fact, June 1982
- Review [French] by Tom Clegg (2002) in Galaxies, #27
