= Santiago: A Myth of the Far Future =

1986 novel by Mike Resnick

Santiago: a Myth of the Far Future
- First edition cover
- Author: Mike Resnick
- Cover artist: Michael Whelan
- Language: English
- Series: Birthright
- Genre: Science fiction Space Western
- Publisher: Tor Books
- Publication date: 1986
- Publication place: United States
- Media type: Paperback
- Pages: 376
- ISBN: 0-8125-2256-7
- OCLC: 50128766
- Followed by: The Return of Santiago

Santiago: A Myth of the Far Future is a science fiction novel by American author Mike Resnick. It was first published in 1986 and reprinted in 2004. The story is essentially a tall tale, in the style of the Wild West, with lonely heroes, shoot-outs, and faithless companions.

== Description ==
The setting of the novel is the Inner Frontier (the region toward the core of the Galaxy) of the interstellar Democracy which humans have formed. The title character, Santiago, is the most sought-after outlaw of the region if not the human universe.

The protagonist is a bounty hunter named Sebastian Nightingale Cain, who receives a very valuable piece of information: a hint to the whereabouts of Santiago. Cain crosses paths with several others also hunting Santiago: besides competing bounty hunters, journalist Virtue Mackenzie wants an interview with Santiago to make her fortune, and the master thief the Jolly Swagman covets some unique pieces of alien art in Santiago's possession.

The novel is divided into six parts, each named after one of the larger-than-life characters that populate the Inner Frontier, and headed by a quatrain, purportedly composed by another such character, the wandering balladeer Black Orpheus.

A sequel was published in 2003, The Return of Santiago. It is similar in structure to its predecessor.

== Reception ==
Orson Scott Card reviewed the novel favorably, saying "Resnick was gutsy enough to set out to create a myth, and as far as I'm concerned, he succeeds on a grand scale." Card later rated Santiago as one of the best SF books of 1986, describing it as "a carefully layered examination of the tension between individuality and responsibility, between legend and reality."

== Other works ==
The novel and the expanded Birthright universe have been developed into a role-playing game adventure path by EN Publishing.
