= The Three-Legged Hootch Dancer =

Mike Resnick SF novel (1983)

Cover of the first edition, published by Signet Books. Art by Don Punchatz.

The Three-Legged Hootch Dancer is a science fiction novel by American writer Mike Resnick, published in 1983.

== Plot summary ==
The Three-Legged Hootch Dancer is a novel in which a carnival owner blackmails a company into performing on the interstellar circuit.

== Reception ==
Greg Costikyan reviewed The Three-Legged Hootch Dancer in Ares Magazine #14 and commented that "The intrusion of a human scale into a genre whose major appeal is its galactic scale is a tricky task to pull off, and few have done it successfully. Mike Resnick is one such writer."

== Reviews ==
- Review by C. J. Henderson [as by Chris Henderson] (1983) in Dragon Magazine, June 1983
- Review by Tom Easton (1983) in Analog Science Fiction/Science Fact, September 1983
