= Kirinyaga (novel) =

1998 novel by Mike Resnick

- Author: Mike Resnick
- Language: English
- Genre: Science fiction
- Publisher: The Ballantine Publishing Group, a Del Rey book
- Publication date: 1998
- Media type: Print
- Pages: 287
- ISBN: 0-345-41701-1
- OCLC: 37843815
- Dewey Decimal: 813/.54 21
- LC Class: PS3568.E698 K57 1998

Kirinyaga: A Fable of Utopia is a science fiction novel published in 1998 by Mike Resnick. It is a series of parables about one man's attempt to preserve traditional African culture on a terraformed utopia.

The prologue and eight chapters of the book were each originally sold as a short story (or novelette or novella, depending on length) but were designed to fit together into a novel that builds to a climax with a coda afterward. The book and its chapters are among the most honored in science fiction history with 67 awards and nominations including two Hugo Awards.

Each section begins with a parable illustrating the relationship between Ngai, the Kikuyu god, and the creatures of the earth. On occasion, it is the narrator that has failed to properly understand the meaning of the story.

== Plot summary ==
Prologue: One Perfect Morning, With Jackals—In Kenya, a son argues with his father whether it is possible to adopt European conveniences and customs and still be a true Kikuyu, the dominant native tribe. The father will be the mundumugu (witch doctor) for the new Kikuyu society on a terraformed planetoid named Kirinyaga. On the way to the spaceport, they detour to see a pair of jackals hiding behind a bush in an area that will become a nature preserve.

Kirinyaga—Koriba kills a newborn child because traditional beliefs dictate that it is a demon. He must then convince Maintenance, the people who maintain the environment and regulate the orbit of the planetoid Kirinyaga, not to interfere with their traditions, no matter how much they dislike them.

For I Have Touched the Sky—A girl finds a falcon with a broken wing and asks the mundumugu to heal it. "Once a bird has touched the sky," Koriba explains, "he can never be content to spend his days on the ground." She persists. In the course of doing chores in exchange for help treating the bird, she discovers Koriba’s computer and the knowledge it can share. This creates conflict with the role held by women in the traditional Kikuyu society.

Bwana—Koinnage, the paramount chief, hires a hunter to reduce the hyena population. The hunter’s idea of utopia differs radically from Koriba’s. The mundumugu must demonstrate that, although the Kikuyu are a farming society, they are not powerless against predators.

The Manamouki—A married couple immigrate to Kirinyaga. Although they try to assimilate, they bring modern ideas that conflict with traditional Kikuyu culture. Can a utopia evolve?

Song of a Dry River—A grandmother refuses to be cared for in the traditional manner and sets up residence near the mundumugu, who lives apart from the village. The mundumugu threatens a drought unless she follows tradition.

The Lotus and the Spear—Three young men have died in unusual circumstances. The mundumugu must find and overcome the cause.

A Little Knowledge—Koriba is training Ndemi as his successor. Eventually he begins to instruct him on the use of the computer. But, as in the Garden of Eden, knowledge is a dangerous thing.

When the Old Gods Die—"It is said that from the moment of birth, even of conception, every living thing has embarked upon an inevitable trajectory that culminates in its death... Yet this knowledge does not lessen the pain of death." For a man intent on maintaining the traditional ways, cultural change may not represent life but the death of the old gods.

Epilogue: The Land of Nod—Koriba returns to Kenya. There, the old ways don’t mesh well with modern city living. When he visits a cloned elephant that is to be killed in a few days' time, Koriba realizes that they are both anachronisms, and that their fates are intertwined.

== Characters ==
- Koriba, the mundumugu (witch doctor), who guides the society
- Koinnage, the paramount chief of the village
- Ndemi, Koriba's student
- Ngai, the Kikuyu god
