= Stalking the Unicorn =

1987 novel by Mike Resnick

First edition (publ. Tor Books) Cover art by Boris Vallejo

Stalking the Unicorn is a novel, mixing the fantasy and mystery genres, by Mike Resnick. The paperback edition was published in the US in 1987. The book is followed by two more adventures of the protagonists, Stalking the Vampire published 2008 and Stalking the Dragon published in 2009. A short story collection, Stalking the Zombie released in 2012.

== Plot summary ==
Mallory, a private investigator from New York, spends New Year's Eve in his office, with a bottle of whisky, and in a terrible mood. His business partner left for California with Mallory's wife, having also blackmailed some of their clients. Since the infuriated victims head for the detective's office, it seems that the night will end up tragically; yet, the plot suddenly takes an unexpected turn as in the room appears a strange creature, an elf called Mürgenstürm.

Mürgenstürm, who comes from an alternative world, is in equally serious trouble. He was obliged to guard a valuable animal, the unicorn called Larkspur. He neglected his duty and the unicorn was stolen. Now, the elf's life is in danger, so he wants to take advantage of Mallory's service.

As he has no other way out of trouble the detective decides to follow Mürgenstürm, and to search for the stolen animal. They enter the alternative New York through the gate in the basement of the very building where Mallory has his office.

When the detective examines the scene of the crime, he encounters the eye-witness, a cat-girl Felina, who, despite her catlike personality, will become Mallory's loyal partner. She reveals that the culprit is a leprechaun, Gillespie, who is working for a perilous and powerful demon, Grundy, that is responsible for spreading evil in both New Yorks. At the same time, the Grundy finds out about Mallory's investigation and tries to dissuade him from taking further steps.

Nevertheless, Mallory does not abandon the investigation and in search of information about the unicorn visits various places in the alternative New York, such as the Museum of Natural History, full of dead yet regularly reviving animals, and Central Park, occupied by wholesalers offering completely useless goods.

On his way Mallory meets Eohippus, a six-inch tall horse that helps him find the expert on unicorns, a former huntress still craving for adventure, Colonel Winifred Carruthers. Unlike Mürgenstürm, who gradually turns out to be more an accomplice in the crime than the victim, Carruthers and Eohippus are valuable allies. Due to Colonel, Mallory comes into contact with a magician, The Great Mephisto, and finds out the motives for the crime. In the unicorn's head there is a ruby that would enable the Grundy to move freely between the two worlds and gain more power than he has ever had.

After a long search Mallory reaches Gillespie's flat on the 13th floor of a cheap hotel only to find out that the leprechaun ran away, the unicorn is already dead, and the gate between the two cities begins to close. In the meantime, Mallory's partners, Colonel and Eohippus, are caught by Gillespie.

Soon after that the detective receives an invitation to the auction at which the precious ruby is to be sold. The Grundy appears there too, and he seems to have all the cards. Yet, it turns out that Mallory, with the help of Felina, has already found and hidden the jewel, which gives him an advantage over the enemy. Grundy sets Mallory's friends free and agrees to wait until the detective delivers the ruby.

Mallory, who has no intention of letting the Grundy wreak havoc in both worlds, has the jewel transported to "his" New York just before the passage between the two worlds closes. Then he meets the Grundy only to inform him about it. Since the demon cannot be sure whether Mallory tells the truth he does not dare to kill the detective, but promises to have his revenge in the future.

Mallory is content to stay in the alternative New York, where his work makes more sense. He is determined to continue his struggle against evil having the noble Colonel and of the mysterious Felina at his side.

== Reception ==
Publishers Weekly called it an "enchanting blend of fantasy and hard-boiled detection", with "crisp dialogue and (an) imaginative setting". Similarly, the SF Site's Tammy Moore considered it to be "whimsical" and "an enjoyable and well-crafted novel"; Moore noted, however, that despite being a "deeply enjoyable read", it is "not a page-turner that will keep you up all night", and that it is "slightly dated (in that) it's written in a style that isn't often used any more".

In Poland, the book was reviewed by Marek Oramus (Feniks, 5/91 (9), p. 155-158).
