= Jack Johnson (Danish footballer) =

Danish footballer (1924-2002)

Personal information
- Date of birth: 3 July 1924
- Date of death: 24 April 2002 (aged 77)

International career
Years	Team	Apps	(Gls)
1951–1954	Denmark	4	(0)

Jack Johnson (3 July 1924 – 24 April 2002) was a Danish footballer. He played in four matches for the Denmark national football team from 1951 to 1954.
