= The Last Full Measure (short story) =

- Short story by George Alec Effinger
- Country: USA
- Language: English
- Genre(s): Science fiction

Publication
- Published in: Isaac Asimov's Science Fiction Magazine
- Publication type: Magazine

"The Last Full Measure" is a short story by American writer George Alec Effinger, originally published in Isaac Asimov's Science Fiction Magazine in 1978.

== Plot summary ==
Bo Steaffler, a young US Army corporal, is participating in the 1944 D-Day landings. Shortly after he hits the beach, he is killed by an explosion. However, he awakes to find himself uninjured and imprisoned in a dark dank cell. He is confronted by a strange creature with hypnotically luminous eyes, identified only as 'Aensa'. The creature communicates telepathically with him, questioning Steaffler as to the weapons and strategies used in the landings, but he's only a corporal and doesn't know much.

The Aensa sends him back to the beaches and when he is again killed, recovers him again. Steaffler, a pulp science fiction enthusiast, eventually realises that the creature is part of a potential invasion of Earth and seeks information on its defences. He projects telepathic visions of all the crazy weapons he has read about in magazines and creates a galaxy-wide scenario for the war.

The Aensa is more and more concerned that Earth may not be ready for invasion, and flings Steaffler back into his own time and place. He is again - finally - killed and as his thoughts fade, he remembers only "We won".
