= Travels with My Cats =

Short story by Mike Resnick

- Short story by Mike Resnick
- Country: United States
- Language: English
- Genre: Fantasy short story

Publication
- Published in: Asimov's Science Fiction
- Publication date: February 2004

"Travels with My Cats" is a fantasy/magic realism short story by Mike Resnick. It won the Hugo Award for Best Short Story in 2005, was nominated for the Nebula Award in 2004.

== Plot summary ==
Small town newspaper editor and failed novelist Ethan Owens leads a cautious, disappointing life, until he spends a few evenings with the long-dead author Priscilla Wallace, who wrote his favorite travel book, 'Travels with My Cats'.

When his only copy is destroyed at the end of the story, Ethan swears to find another and finds a new cause to go on in life.

== Sources, references, external links, quotations ==
- Travels with My Cats title listing at the Internet Speculative Fiction Database
- Travels with My Cats can be read online at Asimov's Science Fiction
- An audio version is available at Escape Pod
