= Birthright: The Book of Man =

1982 novel by Mike Resnick

- First edition cover (publ. by Signet Books)
- Author: Mike Resnick
- Genre: Science fiction
- Publisher: Signet
- Publication date: February 2, 1982
- ISBN: 978-0-451-11358-0

Birthright: The Book of Man is a science fiction novel (or a novel-like series of vignettes) by American writer Mike Resnick, published in 1982. It describes the fictional history of humanity's conquest of the galaxy that serves as environment for a number of the author's other novels.

== Plot summary ==
Birthright spans a timeline of nearly 17 millennia, beginning at a very early stage of expansion from Earth and ending with the death of the last humans. In between, it chronicles a slow but (despite some set-backs) steady conquest of the entire galaxy - inhabited by thousands of sentient alien races, which are overpowered and oppressed using whatever tool it takes: economic pressure, diplomatic finesse, or simple military power.

Not all chapters deal with humanity's treatment of aliens; some also cover the "internal" politics that result in a development of the growing human empire from a democracy to a monarchy. But the biggest theme is undeniably the search for the elusive quality that allows humanity to overcome all opposition and manage the unique feat of conquering the entire galaxy. It is never clearly defined but manifests perhaps most succinctly when it also results in the failure of an attempt to cross the void between galaxies.

Then, after there is no more room for conquest, the only way left is down: internal struggles as well as deep-seated resentment of aliens result in a decline of human power that takes nearly as long as the rise, but is described far less extensively. Somehow, despite whatever enabled humans to achieve total power, they were unable to keep it.

One of the chapters reveals the "literary genre of fiction" as another of humanity's peculiarities, not shared by any alien race.

== Form ==
The book is structured into 26 chapters, each of which forms a complete story, with no characters shared between chapters. At first glance, this looks like a collection of short stories, but the individual stories clearly exist only to form a bigger picture. This impression is reinforced by the linear placement of the stories at key events in the overall timeline.

Each chapter bears the name of a human group or profession on whose contribution to the overall storyline the chapter is focused, such as "The Cartographers", "The Artists", "The Priests".

Furthermore, most of the chapters are prefaced by excerpts from two history textbooks (one written by a human, one by aliens) corresponding to the events described in the chapter. Compared with the "first hand" information the reader gains in the chapters, both sources show a substantial bias in their interpretation of the events while often being in direct contradiction.

== Inspiration and relation to other works ==
The book's narrative describes a historical framework which serves as a setting for a number of Resnick's other works of fiction, including the novels Ivory, A Miracle of Rare Design, and Santiago.

The story is inspired by Resnick's personal interest in Africa. Humanity's behavior and motivation is a direct continuation of 16th to 19th century European colonialism and imperialism: ruthless exploitation and domination of other cultures, justified by an ideology of racial superiority. Birthright is based on the speculation that this behavior could be a fundamental trait of humans, which would be exhibited in just the same way towards extraterrestrial aliens. The later part is apparently based on the rather less speculative notion that seemingly invincible empires can and invariably do crumble and disappear, often quite quickly. History provides numerous examples, including Ancient Rome, the Mongol and British Empires and the domain of Alexander the Great.
