= A Fire in the Sun =

1989 novel by George Alec Effinger

- First edition
- Author: George Alec Effinger
- Cover artist: Steve Youll and Paul Youll
- Language: English
- Series: Marîd Audran series
- Genre: Science fiction, cyberpunk
- Publisher: Doubleday
- Publication date: June 1989
- Publication place: United States
- Media type: Print (hardback & paperback)
- Pages: 189
- ISBN: 0-385-26324-4
- OCLC: 19127822
- Dewey Decimal: 813/.54 19
- LC Class: PS3555.F4 F5 1989
- Preceded by: When Gravity Fails
- Followed by: The Exile Kiss

A Fire in the Sun is a cyberpunk science fiction novel by American writer George Alec Effinger, published in 1989. It is the second novel in the three-book Marîd Audran series, following the events of When Gravity Fails, and concentrating on Marîd's experience as he becomes the main lieutenant of Friedlander Bey's business empire while realizing that his new master has darker aspects than he suspected.

The title of the novel comes from "It's All Over Now, Baby Blue", a song by Bob Dylan: "Yonder stands your orphan with his gun / crying like a fire in the sun".

== Plot summary ==
Taking place some months after the events described in When Gravity Fails, Marîd Audran, once a small-time hustler on the streets of the decadent Budayeen, finds himself as one of the lieutenants of Friedlander Bey or "Papa", the most influential man in the city. With his independence taken from him and being stationed as a liaison between Bey and the local law enforcement under the supervision of Sergeant Hajjar, Audran is forced to pair up with his colleague Jirji Shaknahyi in order to track down yet another serial killer who likes to remove some of the internal organs of their victims.
