= Schrödinger's Kitten =

1988 novella by George Alec Effinger

- Author: George Alec Effinger
- Language: English
- Publication date: 1988

Schrödinger's Kitten is a 1988 novelette by American writer George Alec Effinger, which won a Hugo Award, a Nebula Award, a Theodore Sturgeon Award and the Japanese Seiun Award.

The story utilizes a form of the many-worlds hypothesis, and is named after the Schrödinger's cat thought experiment. It first appeared in Omni.

== Plot summary ==
The story follows a Middle-Eastern woman, Jehan Fatima Ashûfi, through various realities, ranging from one in which she is raped when still a girl, subsequently abandoned by her family, and dies alone; to one in which she is sentenced to death for killing her would-be rapist and being unable to pay the "blood price" to his family; to another in which she becomes a physicist and companion to well-known German scientists Werner Heisenberg and Erwin Schrödinger, and ultimately prevents the Nazis from developing nuclear weapons during World War II by simply forwarding "unintelligible scientific papers" to key politicians looking into the idea.

She is, unusually, aware of the existence of these realities, which she perceives as "visions" and assumes might come to her from Allah. At different points in the story, the adult Jehan of some realities struggles to reconcile her religious upbringing and "visions" with her scientific profession; in the end, however, an aged Jehan finds satisfaction in the explanation of Hugh Everett's theory regarding the possibility of alternate realities, which fits with her personal experiences.

== Awards and nominations ==
Schrödinger's Kitten won the Hugo Award for Best Novelette in 1989, as well as a Nebula Award, Theodore Sturgeon Award and the Seiun Award.

== See also ==
- Many worlds hypothesis
- Schrödinger's cat
