= Augusta Symphony Orchestra (Augusta, Georgia) =

The Augusta Symphony was founded in 1954. The orchestra has grown from a small group of 15 musicians to a full symphony orchestra offering three concert series each season as well as an education and outreach program. The symphony was first under the baton of Harry Jacobs and then Dr. Donald Portnoy. The next music director and conductor was Shizuo Z Kuwahara. During his tenure, the orchestra for a while was called Symphony Orchestra Augusta. The current director is German-born Dirk O. Meyer.

== History ==
The orchestra debuted on May 23, 1954, under the baton of its founding conductor, Harry M. Jacobs (former French horn musician of the Chicago and Minnesota orchestras). Community involvement and the formation of three volunteer support groups followed. In the summer of 1957, The Augusta Symphony Orchestra Guild was formed, its purpose "to aid and assist the Augusta Symphony Orchestra in its continued growth and to broaden its activities". The formation of The Augusta Symphonic League followed in 1961, its purpose "to nurture an awareness and education of its members regarding the activities and mission of the Augusta Symphony, and to financially support the symphony". Another volunteer support arm for the orchestra, The Friends of the Symphony Association, was organized in 1981, its purpose "to promote interest in the Augusta Symphony and in orchestral music, to sponsor activities to support the Symphony, and to foster community participation in Symphony programs."

The 1985–86 season expanded the audience across the state line into South Carolina with the establishment of the Aiken Concert Series funded by the Aiken Symphony Guild. During the 1986–87 season, four full-time core musicians were hired creating the Augusta Symphony String Quartet. The following season, three additional musicians were hired to fulfill the principal positions of bassoon, clarinet, and oboe creating the Augusta Symphony Woodwind Trio. Also during this season, the Discovery Series of young people's concerts was implemented. The Discovery Program included annual Strong Quartet and Woodwind Trip lecture-demonstrations in Aiken and Columbia County schools. This program has expanded so that today's Music in the Schools presents the string quartet, woodwind trio, principal percussion and principal bass players for schools in the area. The 2004–05 season marked the symphony's 50th anniversary season, an occasion celebrated with a Stephen Paulus commission in a world premier concert featuring Metropolitan Opera soprano Deborah Voigt. The 50th-anniversary season closed with the debut of Pops! Under the Stars, a free outdoor community concert.

During the 2005–06 season, the Symphony Series was moved to a new venue, First Baptist of Augusta, where the outstanding acoustics and increased seating improved the overall concert experience. In the 2007–2008 season, a fourth concert was added to Pops! at the Bell Series.

== Concert series ==
The Piedmont Augusta Symphony and Pops! Series are hosted at the Miller Theater in downtown Augusta, Georgia.

The Columbia County Music Series offers people in Columbia County the opportunity to attend classical music concerts in their own community.

Discovery concerts are aimed at attracting children to the symphony and to classical music.

== See also ==
- Augusta, Georgia
- Arts and culture in Augusta, Georgia
