= The Exile Kiss =

1991 novel by George Alec Effinger

- First edition
- Author: George Alec Effinger
- Cover artist: Steve Youll and Paul Youll
- Language: English
- Series: Marîd Audran series
- Genre: Science fiction, cyberpunk
- Publisher: Doubleday
- Publication date: April 1991
- Publication place: United States
- Media type: Print (Hardcover & Paperback)
- ISBN: 0-385-41423-4
- OCLC: 22703559
- Dewey Decimal: 813/.54 20
- LC Class: PS3555.F4 E95 1991
- Preceded by: A Fire in the Sun

The Exile Kiss is a cyberpunk science fiction novel by American writer George Alec Effinger, published in 1991. It is the third novel in the three-book Marîd Audran series, following the events of A Fire in the Sun. The title of the novel comes from Coriolanus, by William Shakespeare: "O! a kiss / Long as my exile, sweet as my revenge!" (Act V, scene 3).

Effinger had begun writing a fourth book in the Marîd Audran series, Word of Night, but died before that work was completed. The posthumously-published Budayeen Nights contains the first two chapters of Word of Night along with other stories of Effinger's.

== Plot summary ==
Married to Indihar, though from his perspective in name only, Marîd Audran gets invited to a reception at the palace of the amir of the city. Shaykh Mahali, the amir, thus wishes to end the rivalry between Friedlander Bey and Reda Abu Adil, two of the most powerful men in the city. Both Audran and Bey, or "Papa" as he's known in the Budayeen, become suspicious when their sworn enemy Abu Adil designates Audran as an officer of the "Jaish", an unofficial militia working for Abu Adil.

However, it is not until after the party that Abu Adil's scheme unfolds: Audran and Bey are put under arrest by Lieutenant Hajjar and charged with the murder of a police officer named Khalid Maxwell. They're sentenced on-the-spot into exile, never to return to the city under pain of death. Left to die amongst the burning sands of a vast desert, their luck finally turns as they are rescued by a Bedouin tribe of Bani Salim, allowing them to start planning the vengeance they'd exact upon Abu Adil and prove their innocence— if they ever make it back to the city alive.
