= Mike Resnick =

American science fiction writer and editor (1942–2020)

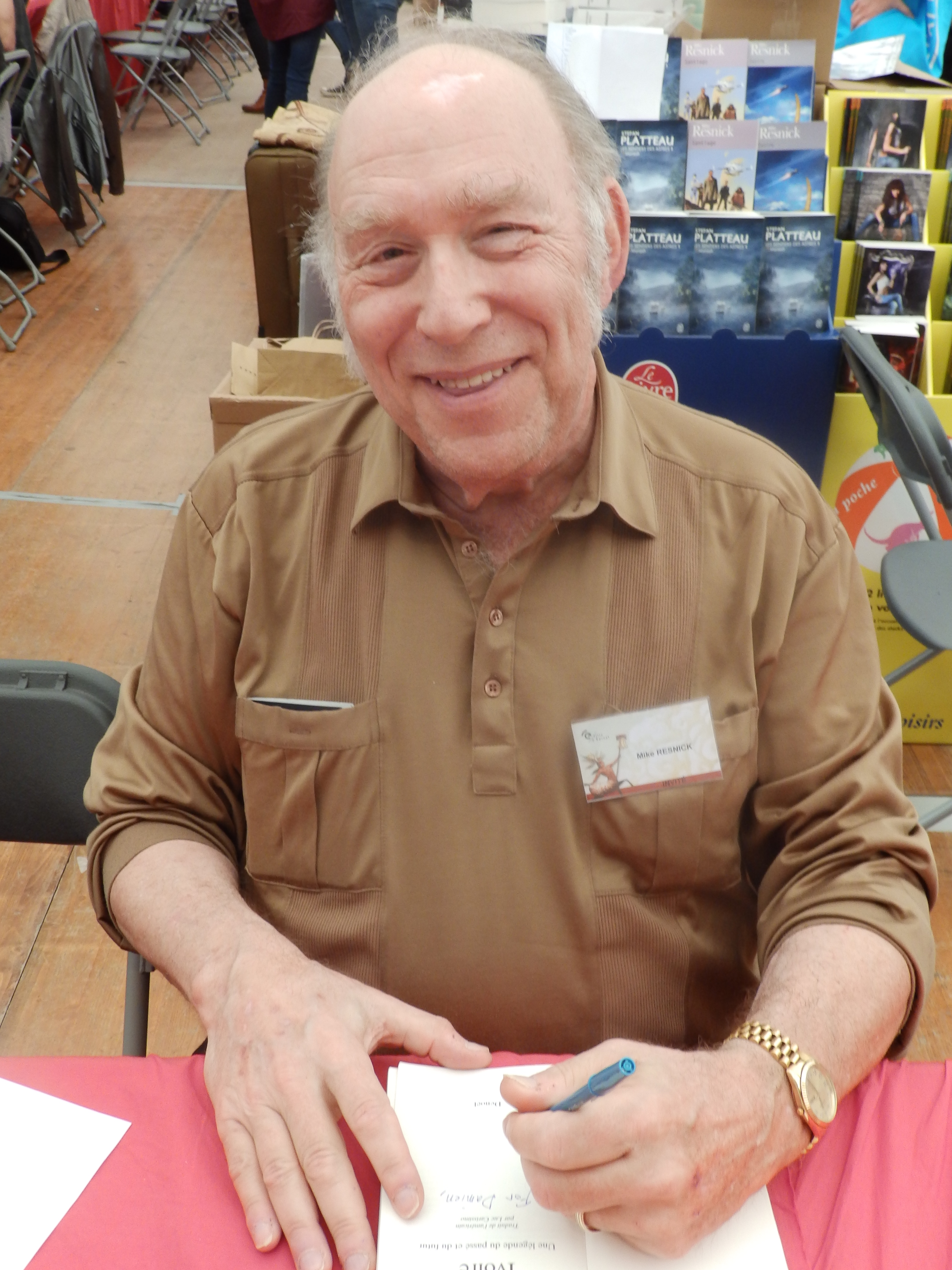
- Resnick in 2016
- Born: Michael Diamond Resnick; March 5, 1942; Chicago, Illinois, U.S.
- Died: January 9, 2020 (aged 77); Cincinnati, Ohio, U.S.
- Occupations: Writer; editor
- Spouse: Carol L. Cain (m. 1961)
- Children: Laura Resnick
- Writing career
- Years active: 1957–2020
- Genre: Science fiction

Michael Diamond Resnick (/ˈrɛznɪk/; March 5, 1942 – January 9, 2020) was an American science fiction writer and editor. He won five Hugo awards and a Nebula award, and was the guest of honor at Chicon 7. He was the executive editor of the defunct magazine Jim Baen's Universe, and the creator and editor of Galaxy's Edge magazine.

== Biography ==
Resnick was born in Chicago on March 5, 1942. He was a 1959 graduate of Highland Park High School in Highland Park, Illinois. He sold his first piece of writing in 1957, while still in high school. He attended the University of Chicago from 1959 to 1961 and met his future wife, Carol L. Cain, there. The couple began dating in mid-December 1960 and were engaged by the end of the month. They were married in 1961.

In the 1960s and early 1970s, Resnick wrote over 200 erotic adult novels under various pseudonyms and edited three men's magazines and seven tabloid newspapers. For over a decade he wrote a weekly column about horse racing and a monthly column about purebred collies, which he and his wife bred and showed. His wife was an uncredited collaborator on much of his science fiction and a co-author on two movie scripts they sold, based on his novels Santiago and The Widowmaker. His daughter Laura Resnick is a science fiction and fantasy author.

Resnick lived in Cincinnati from 1976 until his death from cancer on January 9, 2020.

== Work and themes ==
Two notable motifs are evident in much of Resnick's science fiction work—his love of fable and legend. The other main subject of his work is Africa, especially Kenya's Kikuyu people, their history, traditions and culture and colonialism and its aftermath. He visited Kenya often and drew on his experiences there. Some of his science fiction stories are allegories of Kenyan history and politics; other stories are actually set in Africa or have African characters.

Resnick's style is known for its humor. He enjoyed collaborating with other writers, especially on short stories. Through to 2014 he had collaborated with 52 different writers on short fiction, three on screenplays, and three on novels. Late in life, he began writing and selling a series of mystery novels as well, featuring detective Eli Paxton. He had also sold screenplays based on his novels to Miramax, Capella, and Jupiter 9, and often had multiple properties under option to Hollywood studios.

His work has been translated into: French, Italian, German, Spanish, Japanese, Korean, Bulgarian, Hungarian, Hebrew, Russian, Latvian, Lithuanian, Polish, Czech, Dutch, Latin, Swedish, Romanian, Finnish, Portuguese, Slovakian, Chinese, Catalan, Danish, Croatian, and Greek. Resnick's papers are in the Special Collections Library of the University of South Florida in Tampa.

== Editing ==
Resnick worked as an editor for National Insider from 1966 to 1969, and also as editor-in-chief of National Features Syndicate from 1967 to 1968. He was a publisher and editor for Oligarch Press from 1969 onwards. From 1988 on Resnick edited over 40 fiction anthologies. He was an editorial consultant for BenBella Books from 2004 to 2006 and executive editor of Jim Baen's Universe from 2007 through 2010. From 2011 he was the series' editor for The Stellar Guild series published by Phoenix Pick. The series pairs lesser-known science fiction and fantasy authors with best-selling veterans of the genre. Beginning in 2013, he was the editor of the bi-monthly magazine Galaxy's Edge, published by Arc Manor, which reprints work by major names in the field along with new stories by new and lesser-known writers.

== Fandom ==
Resnick and his wife were participants in science fiction fandom from 1962. As of 2012 Resnick had been the guest of honor at some 42 science fiction conventions and toastmaster at a dozen others. Resnick's wife created costumes in which she and Resnick appeared at five Worldcon masquerades in the 1970s, winning four out of five contests.

== Selected awards and honors ==
In 2012 he was the guest of honor at Chicon 7, the 70th World Science Fiction Convention in Chicago.

=== Hugo awards ===
Resnick was nominated for 37 Hugo Awards and won five times.

- 1989: "Kirinyaga" for Best Short Story
- 1991: "The Manamouki" for Best Novelette
- 1995: "Seven Views of Olduvai Gorge" for Best Novella
- 1998: "The 43 Antarean Dynasties" for Best Short Story
- 2005: "Travels with My Cats" for Best Short Story

In addition to his wins he was nominated for "For I Have Touched the Sky" (1990), "Winter Solstice" and "One Perfect Morning, With Jackals" (1992), "The Lotus and the Spear" (1993), "Mwalimu in the Squared Circle" (1994), "Barnaby in Exile" and "A Little Knowledge" (1995), "When the Old Gods Die" and "Bibi" (with Susan Shwartz, 1996), "The Land of Nod" (1997), "Hothouse Flowers" and "Hunting the Snark" (2000), "The Elephants on Neptune" and "Redchapel" (2001), "Old MacDonald Had a Farm" (2002), "Robots Don't Cry" (2004), "A Princess of Earth" (2005), "Down Memory Lane" (2006), "All the Things You Are" (2007), "Distant Replay" (2008), "Alastair Baffle's Emporium of Wonders" and "Article of Faith" (2009), "The Bride of Frankenstein" (2010), and "The Homecoming" (2012). In 1995 he was the first person to be nominated for four Hugos in a single year. His 37 Hugo nominations through 2015 were an all-time record for a writer at the time.

He was nominated for Best Editor in 1994, 1995, and 2015; for his Chicon 7 Guest of Honor speech in 2007; and for the nonfiction Putting It Together: Turning Sow's Ear Drafts Into Silk Purse Stories (2001), I Have This Nifty Idea...Now What Do I Do With It? (2002), and The Business of Science Fiction (with Barry N. Malzberg) in 2011.

=== Other awards ===
Resnick won one Nebula Award from eleven nominations, and numerous other awards from places as diverse as France, Japan, Spain, Croatia, and Poland.

His novella "Seven Views of Olduvai Gorge" won the Hugo Award for Best Novella, the S.F. Chronicle Poll Award, the 1994 Nebula Award for Best Novella and the 1995 HOMer Award for Best Novella. Between 1991 and 2001, he won a further nine HOMer Awards (bringing his total to 10, from 24 nominations). This placed him at the head of HOMer Award winners, ahead of Robert J. Sawyer with nine wins from 12 nominations.

His 1998 and 2005 Hugo Award-winning stories—"The 43 Antarean Dynasties" and "Travels with My Cats"—also garnered him Asimov's Reader Poll Awards, of which he won a total of five (from 20 nominations), placing him in second place tied with poet Bruce Boston, behind artist Bob Eggleton. He won a total of six S.F. Chronicle Poll Awards, one Locus Award (from 30 nominations, winning in 1996 with "When the Old Gods Die"), a Golden Pagoda Award, two American Dog Writers Awards and an Alexander Award.

In 1995, he was awarded the Skylark (or the Edward E. Smith Memorial Award for Imaginative Fiction) for Lifetime Achievement in Science Fiction. In 2017 he was awarded Writers and Illustrators of the Future's Lifetime Achievement Award.

==== International awards ====
"Seven Views of Olduvai Gorge" won awards in Spain (Ignotus Award), France (Prix Ozone Award) and Croatia (Futura Poll), contributing to a total of three Ignotus Awards and two Prix Ozone Awards. He was awarded the Spanish El Melocoton Mecanico Award for "Old MacDonald Had a Farm" and the Xatafi-Cyberdark Award for "For I Have Touched the Sky", in addition to a Tour Eiffel Award in France for The Dark Lady.

In Japan, he won the Seiun-sho Award for Kirinyaga: A Fable of Utopia, and the Hayakawa Award for "For I Have Touched the Sky". In Poland, "Kirinyaga" won the Nowa Fantastyka Poll Award, while "For I Have Touched the Sky" and "When the Old Gods Die" won SFinks awards. He won Catalonia's Ictineus Award in 2012 for Best Translated Story for "Soulmates", a collaboration with Lezli Robyn.

== Mike Resnick Memorial Award ==
The Mike Resnick Memorial Award was established in 2021 in Resnick's honor, sponsored by Dragon Con and publisher Arc Manor. Contenders must be new, previously unpublished authors. Winners receive a trophy and a cash prize of $250.

The first winner, in 2021, was Z.T. Bright for his story "The Measure of a Mother's Love". In 2022, the winner was “What Would You Pay for a Second Chance?” by Chris Kulp. In 2023, the winner was “For the Great and Immortal” by Daniel Burnbridge. In 2024, the winner was "When I was Your Age" by Sam Brown.

== Series bibliography ==
Resnick wrote more than 70 novels and published over 25 collections. He edited more than 40 anthologies. Fiona Kelleghan compiled Mike Resnick: An Annotated Bibliography and Guide to His Work (Farthest Star, 2000). Adrienne Gormley completed a 679-page second edition, which was published in 2012. This is a list of his series.

=== Ganymede ===
1. The Goddess of Ganymede (1968)
2. Pursuit on Ganymede (1968)

=== Far Future History ===
1. The Soul Eater (1981)
2. Birthright (1982)
3. Santiago (1986)
4. The Dark Lady (1987)
5. Ivory (1988)

=== Galactic Midway ===
1. Sideshow (1982)
2. The Three-legged Hootch Dancer (1983)
3. The Wild Alien Tamer (1983)
4. The Best Rootin' Tootin' Shootin' Gunslinger in the Whole Damned Galaxy (1983)

=== Velvet Comet ===
1. Eros Ascending (1984)
2. Eros At Zenith (1984)
3. Eros Descending (1985)
4. Eros At Nadir (1986)

=== Lucifer Jones ===
1. Adventures (1985)
2. Exploits (1993)
3. Encounters (1994)
4. Hazards (2009)
5. Voyages (2017)

=== John Justin Mallory ===
1. Stalking the Unicorn (1987)
2. Stalking the Vampire (2008)
3. Stalking the Dragon (2009)
4. Stalking the Zombie (2012)

=== Galactic Comedy ===
1. Paradise (1989)
2. Purgatory (1993)
3. Inferno (1993)

=== Tales of Kirinyaga ===
1. Kirinyaga (1991)
2. For I Have Touched the Sky (1989)
3. Bwana (1999)

=== Oracle ===
1. Soothsayer (1991)
2. Oracle (1992)
3. Prophet (1993)

=== Widowmaker ===
1. The Widowmaker (1996)
2. The Widowmaker Reborn (1997)
3. The Widowmaker Unleashed (1998)
4. A Gathering of Widowmakers (2005)

=== Eli Paxton Mystery ===
1. Dog in the Manger (1997)
2. The Trojan Colt (2013)
3. Cat on a Cold Tin Roof (2014)

=== Starship ===
1. Mutiny (2005)
2. Pirate (2006)
3. Mercenary (2007)
4. Rebel (2008)
5. Flagship (2009)

=== Weird West Tale ===
1. The Buntline Special (2010)
2. The Doctor and the Kid (2011)
3. The Doctor and the Rough Rider (2012)
4. The Doctor and the Dinosaurs (2013)

=== Dead Enders ===
1. The Fortress in Orion (2014)
2. The Prison in Antares (2015)
3. The Castle in Cassiopeia (2017)

=== Gods of Sagittarius (with Eric Flint) ===
1. Gods of Sagittarius (2017)

=== Dreamscape Trilogy ===
1. The Master of Dreams (2019)
2. The Mistress of Illusions (2020)
