= Maureen F. McHugh bibliography =

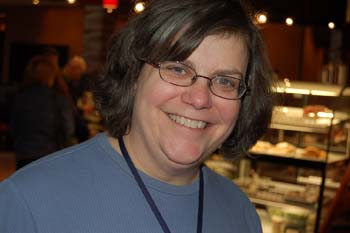
- McHugh in 2006
- Novels↙: 4
- Stories↙: 52
- Poems↙: 3
- Non-fiction↙: 2

Maureen F. McHugh (born 1959) is an American science fiction writer. She has published four novels, three poems, and more than fifty short stories. McHugh's first publication was the short story "All in a Day's Work", which was published in 1988 in Rod Serling's the Twilight Zone Magazine under the pen name Michael Galloglach. Four years later, she published her debut novel, China Mountain Zhang (1992). It earned her the James Tiptree, Jr. Award, the Locus Award for Best First Novel, and nomintions for the Hugo and Nebula Awards for best novel.

== Novels ==
Title	Year of first publication	First edition publisher	ISBN	Ref.
China Mountain Zhang	1992	Tor Books	0-312-85271-1	
Half the Day Is Night	1994	Tor Books	0-312-85479-X	
Mission Child	1998	Avon Eos	0-380-97456-8	
Nekropolis	2001	HarperCollins Eos	0-380-97457-6	

== Short fiction ==
Title	Format	Year of first publication	First edition publisher/publication	Notes	ISBN	Ref.
"All in a Day's Work"	Short story	1988	Rod Serling's the Twilight Zone Magazine	Credited as Michael Galloglach.		
"Baffin Island"	Novelette	1989	Isaac Asimov's Science Fiction Magazine, August 1989 issue			
"Kites"	Short story	1989	Isaac Asimov's Science Fiction Magazine, October 1989 issue			
"The Queen of Marincite"	Short story	1990	Isaac Asimov's Science Fiction Magazine, March 1990 issue			
"The Beast"	Short story	1992	Isaac Asimov's Science Fiction Magazine, March 1992 issue	Collected in Mothers and Other Monsters: Stories (2005).		
"Protection"	Novella	1992	Isaac Asimov's Science Fiction Magazine, April 1992 issue			
"The Missionary's Child"	Novelette	1992	Isaac Asimov's Science Fiction Magazine, October 1992 issue			
"Render unto Caesar"	Novelette	1992	Asimov's Science Fiction, mid December 1992 issue			
"Human Nature"	Short story	1992	Aladdin: Master of the Lamp, edited by Mike Resnick and Martin H. Greenberg, DAW Books			
"A Coney Island of the Mind"	Short story	1993	Asimov's Science Fiction, February 1993 issue			
"Whispers"	Novelette	1993	Asimov's Science Fiction, April 1993 issue			
"Virtual Love"	Short story	1994	The Magazine of Fantasy & Science Fiction, January 1994 issue			
"Nekropolis"	Novelette	1994	Asimov's Science Fiction, April 1994 issue	Collected in Mothers and Other Monsters: Stories (2005).		
"The Ballad of Ritchie Valenzuela"	Short story	1994	Alternate Outlaws, edited by Mike Resnick, Tor Books			
"Joss"	Novelette	1995	Asimov's Science Fiction, February 1995 issue			
"The Lincoln Train"	Short story	1995	The Magazine of Fantasy & Science Fiction, April 1995 issue	Collected in Mothers and Other Monsters: Stories (2005).		
"In the Air"	Short story	1995	Killing Me Softly: Erotic Tales of Unearthly Love, edited by Gardner Dozois, HarperPrism	Collected in Mothers and Other Monsters: Stories (2005).		
"Learning to Breathe"	Short story	1995	Tales of the Unanticipated, issue 15			
"The Cost to Be Wise"	Novella	1996	Starlight 1, edited by Patrick Nielsen Hayden, Tor Books	Contains an early version of a scene that later appeared in Mission Child (1998). Collected in Mothers and Other Monsters: Stories (2005).		
"Homesick"	Short story	1996	Intersections: The Sycamore Hill Anthology, edited by Richard Butner, John Kessel, and Mark L. Van Name, Tor Books			
"Strings"	Short story	1996	Science Fiction Age, November 1996 issue			
"Down on the Farm"	Short story	1997	Return of the Dinosaurs, edited by Mike Resnick and Martin H. Greenberg, DAW Books			
"The Reef Builders"	Round-robin	1997	Omni, May 1997 issue			
"Interview: On Any Given Day"	Short story	2001	Starlight 3, edited by Patrick Nielsen Hayden, Tor Books	Collected in Mothers and Other Monsters: Stories (2005).		
"Presence"	Novelette	2002	The Magazine of Fantasy & Science Fiction, March 2002 issue	Collected in Mothers and Other Monsters: Stories (2005).		
"Makeover"	Vignette	2002	Infinite Matrix, October 7, 2002			
"Laika Comes Back Safe"	Short story	2002	Polyphony, Volume 1, edited by Deborah Layne and Jay Lake, Wheatland Press	Collected in Mothers and Other Monsters: Stories (2005).		
"Frankenstein's Daughter"	Short story	2003	Sci Fiction, April 2, 2003	Collected in Mothers and Other Monsters: Stories (2005).		
"Eight-Legged Story"	Short story	2003	Trampoline, edited by Kelly Link, Small Beer Press	Collected in Mothers and Other Monsters: Stories (2005).		
"Ancestor Money"	Short story	2003	Sci Fiction, October 1, 2003	Collected in Mothers and Other Monsters: Stories (2005).		
"Oversite"	Short story	2004	Asimov's Science Fiction, September 2004 issue	Collected in Mothers and Other Monsters: Stories (2005).		
Mothers and Other Monsters: Stories	Collection	2005	Small Beer Press	Published simultaneously with a limited edition entitled Mothers and Other Monsters: Stories and Poems, which additionally included five poems.	1-931520-13-5	
"Wicked"	Vignette	2005	Mothers and Other Monsters: Stories Small Beer Press	Also appeared in Jul/Aug 2005 issue of Angle.		
"The Lost Boy: A Reporter at Large"	Short story	2007	Eclipse One: New Science Fiction and Fantasy, edited by Jonathan Strahan, Night Shade Books	Collected in After the Apocalypse: Stories (2011).		
Plugged In	Chapbook	2008	Aqueduct Press	Published with L. Timmel Duchamp.	978-1-933500-22-5	
"Kingdom of the Blind"	Novella	2008	Plugged In, Maureen F. McHugh and L. Timmel Duchamp, Aqueduct Press	Collected in After the Apocalypse: Stories (2011).		
"Special Economics"	Novelette	2008	The Del Rey Book of Science Fiction and Fantasy, edited by Ellen Datlow, Del Rey	Collected in After the Apocalypse: Stories (2011).		
"Going to France"	Short story	2008	Lady Churchill's Rosebud Wristlet, issue 22			
"Useless Things"	Novelette	2009	Eclipse Three: New Science Fiction and Fantasy, edited by Jonathan Strahan, Night Shade Books	Collected in After the Apocalypse: Stories (2011).		
"The Naturalist"	Novelette	2010	Subterranean Magazine, spring 2010 issue	Collected in After the Apocalypse: Stories (2011).		
After the Apocalypse: Stories	Collection	2011	Small Beer Press		978-1-931520-29-4	
"After the Apocalypse"	Short story	2011	After the Apocalypse: Stories, Small Beer Press			
"Honeymoon"	Short story	2011	After the Apocalypse: Stories, Small Beer Press			
"The Effect of Centrifugal Forces"	Short story	2011	After the Apocalypse: Stories, Small Beer Press			
"The Memory Book"	Short story	2013	Queen Victoria's Book of Spells: An Anthology of Gaslamp Fantasy, edited by Ellen Datlow and Terri Windling, Tor Books			
"Dead Fads"	Short story	2013	Readercon 24 Souvenir Book, edited by Richard Duffy and Ellen Brody, Readercon			
"Sidewalks"	Short story	2017	Omni, winter 2017 issue			
"Cannibal Acts"	Short story	2017	Boston Review, fall 2017 issue			
"The Starfish Girl"	Short story	2018	Slate, July 23, 2018	Illustrated by Doris Liou.		
"Under the Hill"	Short story	2019	The Magazine of Fantasy & Science Fiction, September/October 2019 issue			
"Yellow and the Perception of Reality"	Novelette	2020	Tor.com, July 22, 2020	Illustrated by Mary Haasdyk.		
"The Goldfish Man"	Short story	2022	Uncanny Magazine, issue 45			
"Prospect Heights"	Short story	2023	Uncanny Magazine, issue 40			
"Just a Nudge"	Short story	2023	The Book of Witches, ed. Jonathan Strahan, Harper Voyager			
"Liminal Spaces"	Short story	2024	Tor.com, January 17, 2024	Illustrated by Katherine Lam.		

== Poetry ==
Title	Year of first publication	First edition publication	Ref.
"Zoo Babies"	2002	Full Unit Hookup, issue 1	
"Alternate History"	2003	Asimov's Science Fiction	
"Les Brown's Band of Renown"	2004	Say..., issue 4	

== Non-fiction ==
Title	Year of first publication	First edition publication	Ref.
"Creating and Using Near Future Settings"	1996	Science Fiction and Fantasy Writer's Sourcebook, 2nd edition, edited by David H. Borcherding, Writer's Digest Books	
"The Anti-SF Novel"	1999	Tales of the Unanticipated, issue 20	
