= Alternate Tyrants =

Book of stories compiled by Mike Resnick

- Editor: Mike Resnick
- Language: English
- Genre: Alternate history, political fiction
- Publisher: Tor Books
- Publication date: February 1997
- Publication place: United States
- Media type: Print (paperback)
- Pages: 337
- ISBN: 978-0-8125-4835-8

Alternate Tyrants is a 1997 Tor alternate history anthology, edited by Mike Resnick. The anthology contains 20 short stories, with each story by a different author, and presents a scenario where an individual becomes a tyrant or dictator in a way that did not occur in real life.

== Contents ==
Title	Author	Scenario
"Children of Tears"	Adrienne Gormley	After Boer uprisings in South Africa during World War II, British Prime Minister Winston Churchill imposes extreme measures throughout the British Empire with special attention being given to suppressing Indian nationalists such as Mohandas K. Gandhi, Jawaharlal Nehru, and Vinoba Bhave.
"Boss"	Mark Bourne	As told via a (fictitious) Studs Terkel oral history, Al Capone, inspired by observing a chance astronomical event, embarks upon a political career and establishes a decades-long Mafia-like presidency in the United States.
"The Rising Sun at Dusk"	Jack Nimersheim	U.S. General Douglas MacArthur renounces his American citizenship and becomes dictator of Japan in the aftermath of World War II, enacting harsh policies to accelerate Japanese reconstruction and industrial output. The front cover of the anthology depicts Douglas MacArthur in Japanese style clothing while standing in front of both the American and Japanese flags, referencing the story.
"And Make Death Proud to Take Us"	Karawynn Long	Cleopatra does not commit suicide and instead seduces Octavian to become his consort and the power behind the throne of the Ptolemaic Kingdom.
"Infallibility, Obedience, and Acts of Contrition"	Brian M. Thomsen	Angelo Giuseppe Roncalli begins radically reinvigorating the Catholic Church early in his career. After becoming Pope, he calls for a world-wide holy war against Israel at the Second Vatican Council that ultimately leads to World War III.
"Causes"	Frank M. Robinson	British Admiral Horatio Nelson is killed at the Battle of the Nile in 1798. France goes on to win the Napoleonic Wars and become the leading superpower of the world.
"Amandla!"	Laura Resnick	Nelson Mandela is assassinated after taking office and as the African National Congress and Inkatha Freedom Party struggle for power, South Africa descends into a blood-soaked race war.
"In the Last Chamber"	Kathe Koja and Barry N. Malzberg	A young Caligula experiences tormenting visions of Christ's crucifixion and converts to Christianity, leading to a more peaceful (and sane) rule of the Roman Empire.
"That'll Be the Day"	Jack C. Haldeman and Barbara Delaplace	An amendment to the United States Constitution lowers the voting age and America's youth elects Elvis Presley as president. Presley establishes an ageist dictatorship, bans all music other than rock 'n roll, and fosters an unstable political system violently dominated by musicians.
"The Symmetry of Duty"	Louise Rowder	After experiencing psychological trauma caused by a bullet-wound, Albert Einstein accepts the offer to become the President of Israel and oversees continued atrocities committed against the Palestinians.
"Jubilee"	Richard A. Lupoff	Julius Caesar survives the attempt on his life in 44 BC. The Roman Republic survives and goes on to dominate the world.
"Mahogany Dreams"	Lyn Nichols	Ronald Reagan is assassinated in 1981 and is succeeded by George H. W. Bush. However, Secretary of State Alexander Haig, determined to preserve the presidency from continued denigration, masterminds a plot to remove his rivals, including Bush, and place himself in the Oval Office.
"A Stable Relationship"	Lawrence Schimel	Mike Resnick becomes the "tyrant" of the American publishing world.
"Faith"	Kristine Kathryn Rusch	A widow claiming to be the wife of God tells her husband's checkered and disillusioned story.
"The October Crisis"	Edo van Belkom	Canadian Prime Minister Pierre Trudeau takes drastic steps to crush the Front de libération du Québec during the October Crisis in 1970.
"The King of Poland's Foot Cavalry"	Roland J. Green	Maurice de Saxe becomes King of Poland and revolutionizes the Polish military. He aligns with France during the Seven Years' War and sends Polish cavalry to assist the French in the North America theater against the British.
"Dao De Qing by Lao Tzu"	Nicholas A. DiChario	Instead of preaching peace, Lao Tzu writes a treatise on how to be an effective tyrant unbound by morality or emotion.
"The Sword in the Stone"	Michelle Sagara	Prince William of Wales engineers a series of political crises in order to restore the power of the British monarchy.
"The Crab Lice"	Gregory Feeley	The Greek god Dionysos begins taking a more active role in the life of Aristophanes, warping the development of drama.
"The Lincoln Train"	Maureen F. McHugh	Abraham Lincoln survives an attempted assassination by John Wilkes Booth, but is rendered a vegetable as a result. William H. Seward takes over in Lincoln's stead and organizes brutal population transfers of Southern civilians who had owned slaves to the Western territories on a neo–Trail of Tears, where they are left to die of starvation and disease.

== See also ==
- Mike Resnick bibliography
- Alternate Generals
