= Bruce Coville's Book of Monsters =

1993 book by Bruce Coville

- First edition
- Author: Bruce Coville; Jane Yolen; Debra Doyle; James D. Macdonald; Sharon Webb; Joe R. Lansdale; Jack Prelutsky; Terry Jones
- Cover artist: Steve Fastner
- Country: United States
- Language: English
- Genre: Horror, Children's
- Publisher: Scholastic Publishing
- Published: 1993-1997

Bruce Coville's Book of Monsters is the first in a series of "Book of" anthologies edited by Bruce Coville. It was first published in September 1993 by Scholastic Publishing. It is collection of stories aimed at juvenile readers that advertises itself as "scary", but in fact contains a wide variety of stories and genres such as science fiction, horror, fantasy, and realistic with some supernatural elements. In this aspect the "Book of" anthologies differ from many other scary anthologies for juvenile readers which often lean towards straight horror.

== Reception ==
Laurie Tynan, writing for Emergency Librarian, compared Bruce Coville's Book of Monsters to "stories told around the summer campfire", calling them "just spooky enough to be good fun without triggering nightmares".

Peggy Latkovich reviewed the audiobook in School Library Journal; she wrote, "The differences in styles and approaches to horror will keep even the most jaded listeners enthralled". She specifically highlighted "Coville's 'My Little Brother Is a Monster,' a complex story with an emotional depth rare in modern children's horror, and 'Kokolimalayas, the Bone Man,' the only folktale in the collection". She found that Michael Markeiwicz's reading of his story "Merlin's Knight School" to be "a mediocre rendition of an adequate story". She further noted that Debra Doyle and James D. Macdonald's "Uncle Joshua and the Googlemen" was a "horrifying" story, but that "the reading is too fast and the accent is too vague to evoke a true sense of place".

== Book series ==
Bruce Coville followed-up his popular first book with a line of other supernatural or sci-fi subject matters for several follow-ups. After six volumes in the initial "Book of" series, the books were popular enough to warrant sequels to each volume. Coville also used the extended series to publish a five-part story, "The Monsters of Morley Manor." The book series was published from 1993 to 1997.

#	Title	Author	Original published date	Pages	ISBN
1	Bruce Coville's Book of Monsters: Tales to Give You the Creeps	Bruce Coville	September 1993	176	0-590-46159-1
Stories include: My Little Brother is a Monster by Bruce Coville, Momster in the Closet by Jane Yolen, Merlin's Knight School by Michael Markiewicz, Uncle Joshua and the Grooglemen by Debra Doyle and James D. Macdonald - later expanded as Groogleman, Friendly Persuasion by Bruce Coville, Kokolimalayas, the Bone Man by Laura Simms retold from a story by the Native American Modoc people, The Thing That Goes Burp in the Night by Sharon Webb, Personality Problem by Joe R. Lansdale, Duffy's Jacket by Bruce Coville, The Bogeyman by Jack Prelutsky, Bloody Mary by Patrick Bone, The Beast with a Thousand Teeth by Terry Jones, Timor and the Furnace Troll by John Barnes.
2	Bruce Coville's Book of Aliens: Tales to Warp Your Mind	Bruce Coville	1994	177	0-606-05771-4
Stories include: I, earthling / Bruce Coville, Brian and the aliens / Will Shetterly, Judgment day / Jack C. Haldeman II, The buddy system / Nina Kiriki Hoffman, To serve man / Damon Knight, How I maybe served the world last Tuesday before breakfast / Lawrence Watt-Evans, Pirates / Mark A. Garland, The secret weapon of last resort / Claudia Bishop, Just like you / Bruce Coville, Zero hour / Ray Bradbury, Curing the bozos / Sherwood Smith.
3	Bruce Coville's Book of Ghosts: Tales to Haunt You	Bruce Coville	1995	180	0-590-46160-5
Stories include: Introduction: Restless spirits / Bruce Coville, The ghost let go / Bruce Coville, The grounding of Theresa / Mary Downing Hahn, A true story / James D. Macdonald, The pooka / Michael Markiewicz, Ghost walk / Mark A. Garland, For love of him / Vivian Vande Velde, Ghost stories / Lawrence Watt-Evans, Mrs. Ambroseworthy / Jane Yolen, Not from Detroit / Joe R. Lansdale, Jasper's ghost / Nancy Etchemendy, The secret of city cemetery / Patrick Bone, The ghost in the summer kitchen / Mary Frances Zambreno.
4	Bruce Coville's Book of Nightmares: Tales to Make You Scream	Bruce Coville	1995	178	0-590-46161-3
Stories include: Introduction: Don't read this book / Bruce Coville, There's nothing under the bed / Bruce Coville, Through the mirror / Anne Mazer, The boy who cried dragon / Deborah Millitello, Drawing the moon / Janni Lee Simner, The cat came back / Lawrence Watt-Evans, The fat man / Joe R. Lansdale, The hand / Eugene M. Gagliano, Toll call / Michael Mansfield, Master of the hunt / Michael Markiewicz, Give a puppet a hand / Mary Downing Hahn, Halloween Party / Steven Prohaska, The baby-sitter / Jane Yolen, Death's door / Mark A. Garland.
5	Bruce Coville's Book of Spine Tinglers: Tales to Make You Shiver	Bruce Coville	January 1, 1996	177	0-590-25930-X
Stories include: The thing in Auntie Alma's pond / Bruce Coville, Letters from camp / Al Sarrantonio, Vampire for hire / Patrick Bone, One chance / Charles de Lint, Grendel / Mary Frances Zambreno, Jenny Nettles / Debra Doyle and James D. Macdonald, Those three wishes / Judith Gorog, What's a little fur among friends? / Sherwood Smith, The sight of the basilisk / Lois Tilton, The teacher who could hear / Paula McConnell, Life with a slob / Gordon Van Gelder, Campfire / S. Anthony Gardner, Past sunset / Vivian Vande Velde.
6	Bruce Coville's Book of Magic: Tales to Cast a Spell on You	Bruce Coville	May 1, 1996	178	0-590-25931-8
Stories include: Introduction: Cloudy, with a chance of magic / Bruce Coville, Wizards's boy / Bruce Coville, Phoenix farm / Jane Yolen, Horsing around / Lawrence Watt-Evans, Windwood Rose / Janni Lee Simner, Bear at the gate / Jessica Amanda Salmonson, The fourth wish / Nina Kiriki Hoffman, Byrd song / Nancy Springer, Watch out! / Bruce Coville, The Wonderworm / Laura Simms, Questing magic / Mark A. Garland and Lawrence Schimel, Visions / Sherwood Smith.
7	Bruce Coville's Book of Monsters II: More Tales To Give You The Creeps	Bruce Coville	1996	178	0-590-85292-2
Stories include: Little monsters / Bruce Coville, First excuse / Nina Kiriki Hoffman, Sea dragon of Fife / Jane Yolen, George Pinkerton and the Bloodsucking fiend of Brokentree swamp / Lawrence Watt-Evans, Recipe for trouble / Lawrence Schimel, Spook man / Al Sarrantonio, Wizard of chaos / Michael Markiewicz, First kiss / Patrick Bone, Optical illusion / Mack Reynolds, Trouble afoot / Mary Downing Hahn, Vend U. / Nancy Springer.
8	Bruce Coville's Book of Aliens II: More Tales to Warp Your Mind	Bruce Coville	November 28, 1996	183	0-590-85293-0
Stories include: Introduction: somewhere, out there / Bruce Coville, Through the starry door (part 2 of "The monsters of Morley Manor") / Bruce Coville, The spider beast / Nancy Etchemendy, George Pinkerton and the space waffles / Lawrence Watt-Evans, Abduction / Rick Hautala, Jesse Hautala, and Matti Hautala, Brandon & the aliens / Jane Yolen, Fine or Superfine / Martha Soukup, The plant people / Dale Carlson, Field trip / Vivian Vande Velde, Hunters / Anne Eliot Crompton, Behind the curtain / Pat Mauser, The very long distance wrong number / John C. Bunnell, Alien promises / Janni Lee Simner.
9	Bruce Coville's Book of Ghosts II: More Tales to Haunt You	Bruce Coville	January 1, 1997	182	0-590-85294-9
Stories include: Introduction: A faint presence, a cold touch / Bruce Coville, A trip to the land of the dead (Pt. 3 of "The Monsters of Morley Manor"), Leaves / Mary K Whittington, George Pinkerton and the bedtime ghost / Lawrence Watt-Evans and Julie Evans, A cry in the night / Nancy Varian Berbereck and Greg Labarbera, Haunted by a pig / Mel Gilden, Call me ghost / Lael Littke, After you've gone / Michael Markiewicz, The tenant who frightened a ghost / Jessica Amanda Salmonson, Soul survivor / Neal Shusterman, Shark! / John Gregory Betancourt, Biscuits of glory / Bruce Coville.
10	Bruce Coville's Book of Nightmares II: More Tales to Make You Scream	Bruce Coville	March 1, 1997	183	0-590-85295-7
Stories include: Introduction: Nightmare Alley / Bruce Coville, When evil wakes (part 4 of "The monsters of Morley Manor") / Bruce Coville, Circle of life / Michael and Rozalyn Mansfield, The dollhouse / Ann S. Manheimer, Bad dream / Joan Aiken, The gravekeeper / Patrick Bone, Gone to pieces / Michael Stearnes, It came from the closet / Andrew Fry, Snow / Al Sarrantonio, The homework horror / Greg Cox, Blackwater dreams / Tim Waggoner, Amanda's room / Janni Lee Simner, The shadow wood / Sean Stewart.
11	Bruce Coville's Book of Spine Tinglers II: More Tales to Make You Shiver	Bruce Coville	May 1, 1997	181	0-590-85296-5
Stories include: Coldest touch (Part 5 of "The monsters of Morley Manor") / Bruce Coville, Ragmore beast / Robert J. Harris, Same time next year / Neal Shusterman, Biology 205 / Jeremy Sabacek, Man under the bridge / Steve Rasnic Tem, All in good time / Michael Markiewicz, Toadstool wood / James Reeves, Come into my cellar / Ray Bradbury, Instrument / Martha Soukup, Elevator / William sleator, Packet / Nina Kiriki Hoffman.
12	Bruce Coville's Book of Magic II: More Tales To Cast A Spell On You	Bruce Coville	1997	179	0-590-85297-3
Stories include: Metamorphosis of Justin Jones / Bruce Coville, World where wishes worked / Stephen Goldin, Transitions / Nina Kiriki Hoffman, Under the bridge / Lawrence Schimel, What the dinosaurs are like / Deborah Wheeler, Wooden city / Terry Jones, Cinders case / Patricia C. Wrede, Into the forest / Alice DeLaCroix, Singing the New Age blues / Margaret Bechard, Vernan's dragon / John Gregory Betancourt, Blue suede shoes / Michael Stearns, Clean as a whistle / Bruce Coville.

== See also ==
- Scary Stories to Tell in the Dark
- Tales for the Midnight Hour
- Short & Shivery
