= Alternate Outlaws =

1994 anthology edited by Mike Resnick

- Editor: Mike Resnick
- Language: English
- Genre: Alternate history
- Publisher: Tor Books
- Publication date: October 15, 1994
- Publication place: United States
- Media type: Print (Paperback)
- Pages: 416

Alternate Outlaws is an alternate history anthology edited by Mike Resnick, published in the United States by Tor Books. There are 28 stories in the anthology, with each story by a different author, and presents a scenario where various historical figures become criminals or outlaws rather than their real-life counterparts. The anthology was released on October 15, 1994.

Some of the stories are not alternate history, but are instead secret history, horror fantasy, satire, pastiche, and other genres.

== Stories ==
Title	Author	Scenario
"Ma Teresa and the Hole-in-the-Wall Gang"	Jack C. Haldeman II	In the 1870s, the Hole-in-the-Wall Gang, led by Ma Teresa, Big Al Einstein, and Little Al Schweitzer, are pursued across the Wild West by Pinkerton agent George Armstrong Custer.
"A Quiet Evening by Gaslight"	Geoffrey A. Landis	After reading Bram Stoker's Dracula, Sherlock Holmes speculates to Dr. Watson about the plausibility of vampires.
"A Spark in the Darkness"	Beth Meacham	During her childhood in the 1880s, Helen Keller, despite being both blind and deaf, learns how to pick locks. As a result, she becomes a safe-cracker.
"Common Sense"	Kristine Kathryn Rusch	Thomas Paine did not emigrate to America in 1774. Later on, a highborn Englishwoman witnesses Paine's trial for treason, while Benjamin Franklin worries about finding a voice for the American rebels.
"Literary Lives"	Kathe Koja and Barry N. Malzberg	In the 1910s, two possible relationships form between Ernest Hemingway and Dorothy Parker.
"Saint Frankie"	Laura Resnick	In 1206, St. Francis of Assisi hears slightly different voices, and as a result, he is more helpful assisting rich people renounce their property and wealth.
"Good Girl, Bad Dog"	Martha Soukup	In the 1950s, Pal the dog gets tired of being called Lassie.
"Comrade Bill"	John E. Johnston III	The 42nd President of the United States checks in with his handlers in Moscow and discovers that, with the end of the Cold War, their priorities have changed.
"The Ballad of Ritchie Valenzuela"	Maureen F. McHugh	A Hollywood film crew shoots a movie about the famous bank robber Ritchie Valenzuela who robbed a bank in Tijuana.
"One Month in 1907"	Frank M. Robinson	The lives of the two men are swapped, with Hugo Gernsback originating the infamous "Gernsback Scheme" while Charles Ponzi publishes science fiction magazines, since 1907, when Gernsback gets screwed in a business deal by Ponzi.
"What Goes Around"	David Gerrold	Charles Manson and his "family" become a third-rate rock band. They are eventually murdered, which provokes commentary on modern society and culture.
"Red Elvis"	Walter Jon Williams	As a boy, an unidentified musician, who appears to be Elvis Presley, reads the works of writers such as Karl Marx, Friedrich Engels and Mahatma Gandhi. He becomes a Communist rebel rocker who is hated for dodging the draft, though he is later honored by Martin Luther King Jr. The front cover of the anthology depicts Elvis in a Communist military uniform sitting in a wooden chair in front of Communist propaganda, referencing the story.
"Cui Bono?"	Katharine Kerr	Thirty years after the Red Scare of the 1950s, a former Army intelligence officer learns from an ex-girlfriend that Joseph McCarthy was a Soviet mole.
"Cowards Die: A Tragicomedy in Several Fits"	Judith Tarr	In 84 BC, Julius Caesar's voicebox gets permanently damaged by Sulla, and as a result, he is forced to grab power through the Roman underworld. Centuries later, a young man from the Alexandria "family" gets involved with an ambitious Roman woman.
"Black Betsy"	Dean Wesley Smith	A recently fired lawyer gets a chance to revisit the moment in his life when he stole a bat from Shoeless Joe Jackson.
"Miranda"	Robert Sheckley	Carmen Miranda is the leader of a gang of bank robbers.
"Riders in the Sky"	Allen Steele	The dirigible is invented in 1860 and used in the American Civil War. After the war, Frank and Jesse James become infamous air pirates, but Northfield, Minnesota and Robert Ford still lie in their future.
"#2, with a Bullet"	Jack Nimersheim	Jack Kennedy is the head of the Kennedy Crime Family.
"Learning Magic"	Janni Lee Simner	Following the death of his mother in 1886 rather than in 1913, a 12 year old Harry Houdini turns to a life of crime.
"The Crimson Rose"	Tappan King	Queen Mary I of England has a son with her husband King Philip II of Spain, resulting in Spain's grip on the English throne. Years later, Mary's son is taken hostage by pirates while in the New World and while there, meets his exiled Aunt Elizabeth.
"What She Won't Remember"	Michelle West	While on holiday in 1926, Agatha Christie learns more about the art of murder.
"My Tongue in Thy Tale"	Gregory Feeley	Secret rival playwrights Francis Bacon and Edward de Vere recruit a player from Stratford to be their public face.
"Souvenirs"	James D. Macdonald and Alan Rodgers	Two Dallas Police officers interrogating Lee Harvey Oswald discover the real reason why he assassinated John F. Kennedy.
"Bigger Than U.S. Steel"	Brian M. Thomsen	A narrative of a ghostwriter for the late Meyer Lansky, chairman of the Federal Bureau of Investigation and the Internal Revenue Service.
"Giving Head"	Nicholas A. DiChario	After a head injury in 1917, Manfred von Richthofen is forced to visit Sigmund Freud, who is studying what makes a man a perfect warrior.
"Satan Claus"	David Gerrold	A group of novelists and screenwriters give Santa Claus an evil twin, to add more drama to the mythology of Christmas. They succeed a little too well.
"Shootout at Gower Gulch"	George Alec Effinger	In 1882, Frank James prevents Robert Ford from killing his brother Jesse. As a result, Jesse James eventually becomes a famous Hollywood actor, though one of Ford's relatives would also end up in Hollywood, as well.
"Painted Bridges"	Barbara Delaplace	A Jewish psychiatrist tries art therapy on his patient Adolf Schicklgruber, but it backfires powerfully.

== See also ==
- Mike Resnick bibliography
