= Alternate Presidents =

Book by Mike Resnick

- Editor: Mike Resnick
- Language: English
- Genre: Alternate history, political fiction
- Publisher: Tor Books
- Publication date: February 15, 1992
- Publication place: United States
- Media type: Print (paperback)
- Pages: 480
- ISBN: 0-8125-1192-1
- OCLC: 25288762

Alternate Presidents is an alternate history anthology edited by Mike Resnick, published in the United States by Tor Books. There are 28 stories in the anthology, including Resnick's own "The Bull Moose at Bay". The other remaining stories are by different authors, and present scenarios where an individual becomes President of the United States in a way that did not occur in real life. The anthology was released on February 15, 1992.

== Stories ==
Title	Author	Scenario
"The Father of His Country"	Jody Lynn Nye	Benjamin Franklin is elected as the first president of the United States against his sole opponent George Washington in 1789 with John Adams becoming his vice president. During his presidency, Franklin creates a more democratic society.
"The War of '07"	Jayge Carr	Aaron Burr is elected the third president in 1800 against Thomas Jefferson, establishes an alliance with Napoleon Bonaparte, and creates a family dictatorship. Aaron Burr serves as president for nine terms until his death on September 14, 1836. His grandson and final vice president Aaron Burr Alston becomes the fourth president of the United States.
"Black Earth and Destiny"	Thomas Easton	Andrew Jackson is elected president over John Quincy Adams in 1824 with John C. Calhoun becoming his vice president, four years earlier than in reality. As a result, Jackson invests government money into biological and chemical engineering, which develops earlier than in reality.
"Chickasaw Slave"	Judith Moffett	Davy Crockett is elected president over Andrew Jackson in 1828 after the latter's image is tarnished by a land-dealing scandal. This eventually results in a Civil War occurring over the Compromise of 1850 and a different version of the Confederacy winning its independence in 1853.
"How the South Preserved the Union"	Ralph Roberts	David Rice Atchison becomes the 13th president in 1849 after Zachary Taylor and Millard Fillmore are killed in a carriage accident shortly into their terms as president and vice president, respectively. This results in the Northeastern states seceding from the country and forming the Confederacy of North America with Daniel Webster as its president and John Brown as the commander of the army. The war ends two years later in 1855 with the northern states being readmitted into the Union shortly afterwards. In 1861, President Stephen A. Douglas introduces the Civil Rights Act of 1861, which abolishes slavery throughout the entire United States.
"Now Falls the Cold, Cold Night"	Jack L. Chalker	Former President Millard Fillmore on the Know Nothing Party is elected the 15th president in 1856 after James Buchanan dies from a stroke in October. When Fillmore upholds the fugitive slave laws in 1858, this results in ethnic tensions and riots in New England and causes it to secede from the Union. John C. Frémont becomes president of the New England Confederacy with William Tecumseh Sherman as his commanding general, opposed by the Army of the United States under Robert E. Lee.
"Lincoln's Charge"	Bill Fawcett	Stephen A. Douglas defeats Abraham Lincoln in 1860. In the hope of preserving the Union, Douglas approves the Manumission Act of 1862, which will free the slaves over a period of ten years, giving everyone time to adjust. The South rejects the compromise and forms the Confederate States of America. When the American Civil War begins later that year, Douglas grows fearful of further provoking the South and doesn't introduce conscription as the Confederacy did. Consequently, the much smaller Union Army is overwhelmed and nearly destroyed by the Confederate States Army at the Second Battle of Manassas in 1862. It takes the United States over a year to recover from this disaster, creating a period of false peace. The false peace gives both sides time to build their armies as well as providing an opportunity for the United Kingdom to decide to support the Confederacy. Douglas fruitlessly continues to negotiate with the Confederacy. Lincoln accepts a commission as the commanding general of the Illinois Militia in the Union Army. Shortly after leading his troops into battle for the first time in 1863, Lincoln is shot and killed by a Confederate sniper.
"We Are Not Amused"	Laura Resnick	A constitutional amendment limits Presidents of the United States to only one term, which forces Ulysses S. Grant out of the race. Victoria Woodhull of the Equal Rights Party is elected the 19th president in 1872 and becomes the first woman to hold that office. Her vice president, Frederick Douglass, becomes the first African American to hold that office. The story is told through a series of letters from Queen Victoria of the United Kingdom to the new president.
"Patriot's Dream"	Tappan Wright King	Leila Morse agrees to marry Samuel J. Tilden, giving him the impetus to secure his 1876 electoral college victory over Rutherford B. Hayes. Tilden is re-elected in 1880 and eventually founds the Liberal Party. His vice president Winfield Scott Hancock is elected the 20th president in 1884 and reelected in 1888 with Grover Cleveland as his vice president.
"I Shall Have a Flight to Glory"	Michael P. Kube-McDowell	Still bruised by his defeat in the 1876 presidential election, Samuel Tilden uses underhanded tactics to win the 1880 presidential election against James A. Garfield. However, Garfield gets help from Charles J. Guiteau (his assassin in real history) and they vainly attempt to convince Tilden that they can fix the corrupted electoral system. When he declines the offer, they assassinate him before he is able to take office.
"Love Our Lockwood"	Janet Kagan	Belva Ann Lockwood of the National Equal Rights Party is elected in 1888 over Democratic incumbent Grover Cleveland and Republican candidate Benjamin Harrison, becoming the first woman to hold the presidency. Her presidency results in expanded democratic rights, including women's suffrage. She serves as president until she is defeated in the 1892 election by Grover Cleveland.
"Plowshare"	Martha Soukup	William Jennings Bryan is elected in 1896 over William McKinley. He serves one term, during which Hawaii and the former Spanish colonies become independent nations following the Spanish–American War. He is a vocal supporter of women's suffrage, which is later granted throughout the United States long after he leaves office in 1913. He declines to run for a second term in 1900, as he believes that presidents should only serve one term. In spite of this, in 1915, Bryan reveals to the American public that he intended to prevent the expected Republican presidential nominee Theodore Roosevelt's plan to take the US into World War I following the sinking of the Lusitania from coming to fruition by running against him and defeating him in the 1916 election.
"The Bull Moose at Bay"	Mike Resnick	As a result of him not being harmed by John Schrank during his assassination attempt in October 1912, former President Theodore Roosevelt of the Bull Moose Party wins the 1912 election over Republican incumbent William Howard Taft and Democratic candidate Woodrow Wilson. As president, he supports women's suffrage and wins World War I against Germany within a year, but he nevertheless expects to lose the 1916 election.
"A Fireside Chat"	Jack Nimersheim	James M. Cox is elected in 1920 after Republican candidate Warren G. Harding dies from a stroke, but five weeks after the election, he is assassinated by an anti-League of Nations activist, leaving his vice president, Franklin D. Roosevelt, to become the 29th president. Adolf Hitler becomes Chancellor of Germany earlier than in real life and in 1925 the two of them establish an alliance to maintain the balance of power.
"Fighting Bob"	Kristine Kathryn Rusch	Robert M. La Follette Sr. is elected president in 1924 over Republican incumbent Calvin Coolidge and Democratic candidate John W. Davis. He dies the next year on June 18, 1925 (the same date as he did in real life) and is succeeded by his vice president Burton K. Wheeler.
"Truth, Justice, and the American Way"	Lawrence Watt-Evans	Al Smith runs as a third-party candidate in the 1932 election. Due to a split in the Democratic Party, Herbert Hoover is re-elected against both him and Franklin D. Roosevelt. Henry Stimson continues to serve as Secretary of State. On Stimson's advice, Hoover goes to war with Japan in 1934. FDR attempts to gain the presidency as the Democratic candidate again in both 1936 and 1940, but loses both times to Stimson, who becomes the 32nd president. Under his leadership, the United States emerges victorious from the war. President Stimson, however, is criticized for not crushing Japan entirely by invading the Home Islands. In 1938, Adolf Hitler is overthrown and killed by a cabal of generals and Hermann Göring succeeds him as the second Führer, continuing to serve in that position until at least 1953. Due to the survival of Nazi Germany, totalitarianism and antisemitism grows stronger across the world well into the 1950s.
"Kingfish"	Barry N. Malzberg	Huey Long escapes assassination in 1935 and runs for president in 1936 as an independent. He steals away Franklin Roosevelt's vice president John Nance Garner. Long defeats both Roosevelt and Republican candidate Alf Landon. World War II is averted when Long invites Hitler to Washington in 1938 and assassinates him with a bomb, but this leads to a war between the US and Germany.
"No Other Choice"	Barbara Delaplace	Thomas E. Dewey is elected president in 1944 and is pressured to end World War II by dropping the atomic bomb on Tokyo.
"The More Things Change..."	Glen E. Cox	The 1948 election plays out in reverse, with underdog Thomas E. Dewey eventually defeating incumbent President Harry S. Truman by playing to anti-communist fears. He becomes the 34th president with Earl Warren as his vice president.
"The Impeachment of Adlai Stevenson"	David Gerrold	Adlai Stevenson is elected in 1952 because Dwight D. Eisenhower chooses Joseph McCarthy as his running mate instead of Richard Nixon. Stevenson is re-elected in 1956 but is impeached and forced to resign in 1958. His vice president, John F. Kennedy, becomes the 35th president.
"Heavy Metal"	Barry N. Malzberg	A feud between John F. Kennedy and Chicago Mayor Richard J. Daley leads to Richard Nixon being elected president in 1960.
"Fellow Americans"	Eileen Gunn	Barry Goldwater wins the election in 1964 over Lyndon B. Johnson and uses nuclear weapons on North Vietnam to win the Vietnam War. Goldwater is re-elected President in 1968 and serves until 1973. Meanwhile, Richard Nixon, who had retired from politics in the late 1960s, has been hosting a popular late-night talk show called Tricky Dick on NBC for over 20 years.
"Dispatches From the Revolution"	Pat Cadigan	Lyndon B. Johnson decides to run for a second full term in the 1968 presidential election. This leads to widespread protests in the United States and a bomb going off at the Democratic National Convention, resulting in the deaths of President Johnson, Vice President Hubert Humphrey, Senator George McGovern, and Senator Eugene McCarthy. While official policy states that Robert F. Kennedy was also killed in the explosion, he was actually killed by a Chicago policeman. The chaos at the convention leads to an actual revolution. Ronald Reagan is elected president and turns the United States into an autocratic state.
"Suppose They Gave a Peace..."	Susan Shwartz	George McGovern is elected in 1972, and attempts a tricky immediate withdrawal from the Vietnam War.
"Paper Trail"	Brian M. Thomsen	George McGovern is elected in 1972 after G. Gordon Liddy is discovered to have murdered Carl Bernstein to cover up the Watergate scandal.
"Demarche to Iran"	Alexis A. Gilliland	Gerald Ford gives Nixon a specific, rather than general, pardon, thus keeping his popularity high enough that he wins the 1976 presidential election over Jimmy Carter. As a result of this, he threatens war with Iran over the Iran hostage crisis.
"Huddled Masses"	Lawrence Person	Walter Mondale is elected president in 1984 against Ronald Reagan. As a result, the Sandinista movement expands, causing a civil war in Mexico followed by a US invasion in 1987, and numerous Latin American refugees entering the American Southwest.
"Dukakis and the Aliens"	Robert Sheckley	Michael Dukakis is elected president in 1988, but is revealed to be an alien attempting to infiltrate Dulce Base. The Men in Black, along with friendly aliens, rewrite history in order for George H. W. Bush to win the 1988 election instead, resulting in today's timeline.

== See also ==
- Mike Resnick bibliography
- Lists of fictional presidents of the United States
