= Delaplace =

Delaplace is a French surname. Notable people with the surname include:

- Anthony Delaplace (born 1989), French road cyclist
- Barbara Delaplace (1952–2022), Canadian science fiction author
- Jonathan Delaplace (born 1986), French footballer
