= Alan Rodgers =

American novelist (1959–2014)

Alan Rodgers (August 11, 1959 – March 8, 2014) was a science fiction and horror writer, editor, and poet. In the mid-eighties he was the editor for Night Cry. His short stories have been published in a number of venues, including Weird Tales, Twilight Zone and a number of anthologies, such as Darker Masques, Prom Night, and Vengeance Fantastic. His novelette "The Boy Who Came Back from the Dead" won the Bram Stoker Award for Best Long Fiction in 1987 and was nominated for the World Fantasy Award.

== Biography ==
Alan Rodgers was born in 1959. From summer 1985 to fall 1987, Rodgers was the editor of the horror digest Night Cry. In 1987, his "The Boy Who Came Back From the Dead" tied for the Bram Stoker Award for Best Long Fiction. In 1990, his "Blood of the Children" was nominated for the Bram Stoker Award for Best First Novel.

He died at Anaheim on March 8, 2014.

== Bibliography ==
=== Novels ===
- Blood of the Children, Bantam Books, 1990 (ISBN 0-553-28335-9).
- Fire, Bantam, 1990 (ISBN 0-553-28777-X).
- Night, Bantam, 1991 (ISBN 0-553-28971-3).
- Pandora, Bantam, 1995 (ISBN 0-553-56305-X).
- Bone Music, Longmeadow Press, 1995 (ISBN 0-681-10086-9).
- The Bear Who Found Christmas, Wildside Press, 2000 (ISBN 1-58715-107-3).
- Her Misbegotten Son, Wildside, 2000 (ISBN 1-58715-155-3).

=== Collections ===
- New Life for the Dead, Wildside, 1991.
- Ghosts Who Cannot Sleep, Wildside, 2000 (ISBN 1-58715-106-5).

=== Short stories ===
- Rosemary: Scrambled Eggs on a Blue Plate, Tor Books, 1992 (co-written with James D. Macdonald and collected in Mike Resnick's alternate history anthology Alternate Kennedys)
- Souvenirs, Tor Books, 1992 (co-written with James D. Macdonald and collected in Mike Resnick's alternate history anthology Alternate Outlaws)
