= Groogleman =

1996 novel by Debra Doyle and James D. Macdonald

Groogleman is a young adult science fiction novel written by Debra Doyle and James D. Macdonald and published by Harcourt in 1996. Set in a post-apocalyptic future, it is the story of 13-year-old Dan Henchard, who shows signs of an immunity to the deadly plague which threatens his village. Feeling that he may be destined to be a healer, he travels with his friend Leezie to "The Dead Lands," a plague-ravaged area, where they must face not only the plague, but the fearsome grooglemen, strange creatures who steal the heads of the plague victims. Groogleman was expanded from the short story, "Uncle Joshua and the Grooglemen," written by the same authors, which was first published in the 1993 anthology Bruce Coville's Book of Monsters.

Groogleman was translated into French in 1998 and published by Hachette Livre under the title La nuit des Hommogres (ISBN 2012098185).
