= Alternate Kennedys =

1992 anthology edited by Mike Resnick

- Editor: Mike Resnick
- Language: English
- Genre: Alternate history, political fiction
- Publisher: Tor Books
- Publication date: July 1, 1992
- Publication place: United States
- Media type: Print (Paperback)
- Pages: 398

Alternate Kennedys is an alternate history anthology edited by Mike Resnick, published in the United States by Tor Books. There are 26 stories in the anthology, including Resnick's own "Lady in Waiting". The remaining stories by various authors present scenarios where members of the Kennedy family had lives that were different from real life. The anthology was released on July 1, 1992.

== Stories ==
Title	Author	Scenario
"A Fleeting Wisp of Glory"	Laura Resnick	The Cuban Missile Crisis blows up in 1962, leading to World War III and the apocalypse. Several centuries after apocalypse, legends of the two Camelots become entwined.
"In the Stone House"	Barry N. Malzberg	Joseph P. Kennedy Jr. is not killed in action during World War II and is later elected President of the United States in 1952. His presidency collapses in 1955 after he fires Secretary of State Joe McCarthy.
"The Kennedy Enterprise"	David Gerrold	In 1929, Joe Kennedy divorces his wife Rose and moves to Hollywood, where he marries Gloria Swanson and his sons go into the movie business. Later on in his life, Joe's son Jack is a second-rate actor who has appeared in numerous films in the 40s and 1950s, but is washed up by the 60s. In 1966, he is cast as Captain Jack Logan of the U.S.S. Enterprise (NCC-1701) in Gene Roddenberry's hugely popular science fiction television series Star Track.
"The Best and Brightest"	Kristine Kathryn Rusch	Robert F. Kennedy is elected president in 1964. Later on, a black reporter faces a personal crisis when he is given evidence that Kennedy ordered an assassination attempt on Martin Luther King Jr.
"The 1960 Presidential Campaign, Considered as a World Wrestling Federation Steel Cage Match or Short Count in Chicago"	Jack C. Haldeman II	This story depicts the world affairs of 1960 and the US presidential election seen through the metaphor of professional wrestling. Referee Chicago Dick (Richard J. Daley) gives the long count to the Trickster (Richard Nixon) and the short count to the Hyannis Kid (John F. Kennedy).
"Siren Song"	Susan Schwartz	John F. Kennedy abandons love, peace, and bliss with a mermaid to knowingly go back to a life he knows will end with his murder in Dallas.
"Them Old Hyannis Blues"	Judith Tarr	In a role reversal world, Elvis Presley is the US President while the Kennedy brothers are famous rock singers. Meanwhile Mick Jagger is an underground leader and John Lennon is the United States Secretary of State. The front cover of the anthology depicts a stack of vinyl records with a record showing the Kennedy brothers on top, referencing the story.
"Rosemary: Scrambled Eggs on a Blue Plate"	Alan Rodgers and James D. Macdonald	After she is lobotomized, Rosemary Kennedy has nightmares about aliens killing her brothers, replacing JFK with an alien double and lobotomizing her.
"The Missing 35th President"	Brian M. Thomsen	In a tabloid-style story, future cloners/archaeologists can not find John F. Kennedy’s remains. The story also depicts Kennedy's alleged post November 22, 1963 activities, such as marrying Marilyn Monroe and becoming Earth’s ambassador to the Galactic Congress.
"Freedom"	Barbara Delaplace	With Joseph P. Kennedy Sr. badgering his children to achieve his agenda, Joseph P. Kennedy Jr. decides death is his only escape from his father.
"A Massachusetts Yankee in King Arthur’s Court"	Harry Turtledove	John F. Kennedy is briefly transported back in time to ancient Britain, where he meets King Arthur of Camelot.
"President-Elect"	Mark Aronson	Robert F. Kennedy survives his assassination attempt by Sirhan Sirhan. As a result, he adopts a hard anti-crime stance and becomes a member of the Republican Party. He wins the Republican nomination and selects former Vice President Richard Nixon as his running mate. Meanwhile, Robert's brother Ted wins the Democratic nomination, resulting in the 1968 election becoming a Kennedy vs Kennedy match-up. On election day, Robert defeats his brother. However, President-elect Robert dies in a car accident on Chappaquiddick Island, resulting in Vice President-elect Nixon becoming the 37th president of the United States.
"No Prisoners"	Pat Cadigan	Robert F. Kennedy decides to become a priest while his sister Eunice enters politics. Nearly three decades later in 1968, former Attorney General and now Senator Eunice Kennedy is faced with the final outcome of her brother's antiwar activism.
"Lady in Waiting"	Mike Resnick	Marilyn Monroe does not become an actress and remains under her original name Norma Jeane Mortenson. Years later at her waitress job in Washington, D.C., she is picked up by President Kennedy for a one-night stand and futilely dreams of becoming the First Lady of the United States.
"The Inga-Binga Affair"	Michael P. Kube-McDowell	During World War II, it is revealed that Navy officer John F. Kennedy was having an affair with a suspected female Nazi spy. Alerted that the FBI is taping his trysts, JFK plots to get out from under his father's control.
"Bobbygate"	Rick Katze	John F. Kennedy is not assassinated in 1963 and runs for reelection the following year. However, a reporter stumbles onto links between Kennedy's brother Robert and a break-in at the Republican national headquarters (similar to the real life Watergate scandal), leading to Kennedy's father Joseph attempting to cover-up the scandal by whatever means necessary, including murder.
"Now And in the Hour of Death"	Debra Doyle and James D. Macdonald	Kathleen Kennedy is not killed in a plane crash in 1948.
"Eoghan"	Nancy Kress	A fantasy version of the Kennedy clan. They are magically blessed while they do good. However, John F. Kennedy's refusal to withdraw from the Vietnam War results in him getting assassinated in Dallas.
"’Til Death Do Us Part"	Charles von Rospach	One night in 1962, Marilyn Monroe is caught sneaking out of the White House. She later commits suicide and her ghost haunts President John F. Kennedy, urging him to find a way to be with her.
"Gloria Remembers"	Brian M. Thomsen	Joseph P. Kennedy Sr. signs a pact with Satan in order to have the Kennedy name glorified through his sons. He thinks it will be through their deeds.
"Told You So"	Esther M. Friesner	In a world where magic and mythical creatures exist, John F. Kennedy saves the life of a leprechaun and is given the power of making anything true merely by speaking it into reality. Kennedy begins to change the world for the better, but a misstatement in Berlin leads to disastrous effects.
"The End of the Summer by the Great Sea"	Ginjer Buchanan	Time traveling aliens do awful things to the Kennedy family.
"Prince Pat"	George Alec Effinger	Instead of dying two days after his birth in 1963, Patrick Bouvier Kennedy survives to adulthood and enter politics. He runs for president in 2000 as a Democrat with the aid of his numerous cousins, all intent on avoiding 1990s style marketing-politics. In the end, it pays off, and Kennedy defeats incumbent Republican president and former Secretary of State James A. Baker.
"The Disorder and Early Sorrow of Edward Moore Kennedy, Homunculus"	Robert Sheckley	Ted Kennedy suffers a nasty fate.
"Rosemary’s Brain"	Martha Soukup	Rather than getting the prefrontal lobotomy in 1941 that permanently incapacitated her, Rosemary Kennedy instead receives an experimental operation that turns her into a genius. Afterwards, she discusses her plans for her future with her godfather.
"The Winterberry"	Nicholas A. DiChario	John F. Kennedy survives Lee Harvey Oswald’s assassination attempt, but suffers severe brain-damage. As a result he is secretly cared for by his brother Ted and their mother Rose with only them and doctors knowing about it.

== See also ==
- Mike Resnick bibliography
- Assassination of John F. Kennedy in popular culture
