= Mission Child =

1998 novel by Maureen F. McHugh

- Cover of the first edition
- Author: Maureen F. McHugh
- Cover artist: Debra Lill
- Language: English
- Genre: Science fiction
- Published: 1998 (Avon Eos)
- Publication place: United States
- Media type: Print (hardcover, paperback)
- Pages: 385 (1st edition)
- ISBN: 978-0-380-97456-6
- OCLC: 39313436

Mission Child is a science fiction novel by Maureen F. McHugh. Set on a once-forgotten colony planet, it follows the life of Janna, the titular mission child, who witnesses the massacre of her loved ones and is displaced time and again as her world is radically changed by contact with new colonists from Earth. The novel explores the impacts of colonization on colonized peoples, the estranging power of technology, and Janna's gender identity as she disguises herself as a young man, takes on a new name, and over time comes to identify as neither a man nor a woman.

Mission Child was critically well-received, both contemporaneously and in the decades following its publication, with reviewers particularly highlighting its worldbuilding and realism. It was included in the 1998 James Tiptree Jr. Award Honor List.

== Plot ==
Protagonist Janna begins the book as a young teenager who has grown up in a mission called Hamra on an isolated and largely forgotten colony planet. The mission's founders have strictly controlled her people's access to advanced technology. As a result, the people of Hamra are left defenseless when a group of marauders attacks, and nearly everyone is massacred. Janna and another survivor seek refuge with a nearby clan, marry, and have a child, but before long, both the child and Janna's new husband die.

Cast out by the clan with whom she had sought refuge, Janna travels to a refugee camp in another city and meets a shaman who teaches her how to disguise herself as a boy, a practice she quickly takes up. In her disguise and under the more masculine name "Jan", she finds a job with which she is able to support herself for a time, but before long, another tragedy strikes. She spends years wandering the planet, still using the name Jan, and over time, she comes to see herself as neither female nor male. Eventually, Jan settles in an island society, which is soon afflicted by a deadly plague.

== Major themes ==
=== Colonization and its impacts ===
Mission Child takes place on a planet that was colonized by humans, forgotten, and then later re-discovered. The re-discovery brings new arrivals from Earth, whose more advanced weapons—along with the germs that follow them from Earth—radically disrupt the planet's ecology and the existing residents' way of life. These existing residents, which include the protagonist and her Hamran people, are cast in the narrative as Indigenous peoples coming newly into contact with colonizers. The Hamra mission, set up by off-worlders, parallels real-world religious missions. Multiple reviewers have noted similarities between the fictional Hamrans and the Sámi peoples of Sápmi, and one described the Hamrans' "plight" as "not very different from that of Native Americans in the 19th century".

Discussing the worldbuilding in her 2009 review of the novel, Jo Walton wrote that "McHugh knows what colonial and post-colonial societies are like, and sees no reason why it would be different on another planet." Critic Thomas A. Easton described Mission Child as a story interested above all in "the intersection of societies, the collision of 'primitive' and 'advanced'". The protagonist, Easton concluded, is the necessary person "who can bridge the cultures".

=== Gender ===
The Encyclopedia of Science Fiction describes Mission Child as a work of transgender science fiction. The novel's protagonist, known first as Janna and later as Jan, undergoes a change in how she understands her gender over the course of the novel; after living as a young woman and then as a man, she concludes that she belongs to neither gender. During her journey, Jan encounters a shaman who teaches her how to pass as a man and a doctor who is accepting of her and of transgender people generally. Writing for Tor.com, Alex Dally MacFarlane described this as a depiction of non-binary gender, stating that Mission Child doesn't make "a grand statement" about non-binary people but rather explores one character's individual experience of gender alongside many other life experiences.

=== Technology ===
Advanced technology is not a straightforward good in the world of Mission Child. While it can be helpful, it is unevenly distributed among the peoples living on Janna's planet, and that uneven distribution creates social problems. The novel's ambivalence toward technology is also reflected in the protagonist herself, who early in the novel is given three high-tech bodily implants that she doesn't understand. The implants become both tools for survival and sources of pain and alienation, functioning narratively "much like the ambiguous magical gifts of fairy tales." In his review of the novel for Interzone, Paul J. McAuley described Janna as a character "culturally and sexually disenfranchised by carelessly-wielded technology" and identified this as a continuation of similar themes in McHugh's previous novels, which featured "hostile societies in which technology is estranging rather than ... empowering".

== Publication history ==
An early scene in Mission Child, in which the people of the Hamra mission are massacred, first appeared in an earlier short story by McHugh titled "The Cost to Be Wise". In "The Cost to Be Wise", the scene included an outside witness to the massacre who does not appear in Mission Child.

Three editions of Mission Child were published between 1998 and 1999:

- 1998: US, Avon Eos, November 1998, hardcover. ISBN 0-380-97456-8, 978-0-380-97456-6.
- 1999: US, Avon Eos, November 1999, paperback. ISBN 0-380-79122-6, 978-0-380-79122-4.
- 1999: UK, Orbit, December 1999, paperback. ISBN 1-85723-861-3, 978-1-85723-861-7.

It has since fallen out of print.

== Reception ==
Mission Child was critically well-received. Many reviewers praised its worldbuilding, which Gary K. Wolfe likened to that found in the works of Ursula K. Le Guin. Wolfe also praised the novel for its pacing and characterization and the interweaving of the protagonist's identity with her environment. Paul J. McAuley likewise compared the novel favorably to the works of Le Guin, noting that its "langorous" pacing and "finely focused narrative" differentiated it from typical science fiction novels of the era. Thomas A. Easton recommended the novel in his review for Analog Science Fiction and Fact, as did Peter Tennant for The Third Alternative, with Tennant calling it a "richer, more complex" book than McHugh's first novel, China Mountain Zhang.

A. M. Dellamonica described Mission Child as a nearly perfect novel, but cautioned that it may not be the right fit for readers who prefer action or dislike ambiguity. Similarly, Norman Spinrad wrote that "if Mission Child has a flaw, it is a decided lack of the flash" present in McHugh's previous two novels, but praised its realism and called its ending "close to perfect". In a 2014 column on non-binary gender in science fiction, Alex Dally MacFarlane highly recommended Mission Child, pointing to the narrative's tight focus on its protagonist's personal journey as one of its greatest strengths. Simultaneously, MacFarlane described the lack of non-binary characters other than the protagonist as a shortcoming of the novel.

== Awards and nominations ==
| Year | Award | Result | Ref. |
|---|---|---|---|
| 1998 | James Tiptree Jr. Award | Honor List | |
| 1999 | Locus Award for Best Science Fiction Novel | 16th | |
| 1999 | Nebula Award for Best Novel | Nominated | |

== See also ==
- The Left Hand of Darkness – 1969 science fiction novel by Ursula K. Le Guin
- "The Lincoln Train" – 1995 short story by Maureen F. McHugh
- She Who Became the Sun – 2021 fantasy novel by Shelley Parker-Chan
