= Fire (Rodgers novel) =

1990 novel by Alan Rodgers

Fire is an apocalyptic science fiction/horror novel by Alan Rodgers, published in 1990 as an original paperback from Bantam Books. It was reprinted by specialty publisher Wildside Press in 2000.

== Plot summary ==
Fundamentalist Christian American President, Paul Green, is unhinged by the accidental death of his wife while she was vacationing in the Soviet Union. President Green attempts to provoke a nuclear war in order to usher in Armageddon and the Rapture. The expected nuclear holocaust does not occur. Both the US and Soviet arsenals malfunction and American Armed Forces refuse to obey Green's commands. One bomb goes off in Kansas City.

Meanwhile, a genetic engineering research facility has developed a strain of bacteria that can reanimate fossilized tissues from DNA. A bomb explosion at the facility spreads the bacteria into the area around the facility, animating a dead dog. The ashes of a fossil trilobite are also reanimated, then incinerated, by the head researcher. The Researcher had left the facility with the vial containing the ashes, and died in a fire, with the ashes having been poured on his body by an angry drug addict who mistook the vial for drugs. This results in the spreading of the bacterial infection to a second epicenter. The bacteria turns out to be immune to fire.

== Reception ==
Graham Masterton and J. Michael Straczynski both praised the book at the time of publication, with Straczynski describing it as a mix of "Biblical prophecies, high-tech, and ancient horrors".
