= Bones of Faerie =

2003 young adult fantasy novel by Janni Lee Simner

- Author: Janni Lee Simner
- Publisher: Random House Books for Young Readers
- Publication date: January 27, 2009
- ISBN: 978-0-375-84563-5
- Followed by: Faerie Winter (2011)

Bones of Faerie is a 2009 young adult fantasy novel by American author Janni Lee Simner. It is about a girl named Liza, who lives in a post-apocalyptic world where a war between faerie and humans has left behind a devastated planet. What humans are left fear the effects of the Faeries power so much that they will kill anyone touched by magic.

== Plot summary ==
The war between humanity and Faerie devastated both sides. Nothing has been seen or heard from Faerie since, but in the human world, some magic remains embedded in nature. Corn resists being harvested; dandelions have thorns. Trees terrorize villagers, and the town where Liza lives is surrounded by a forest that seems alive and will kill anyone who goes near. But Liza believes her father can protect their town. He does so by electing himself town leader and laying down strict rules, the most important being that any trace of magic must be destroyed, no matter where it is found.

Then Liza's sister is born with faerie magic, and Liza's father leaves the baby on a hillside to die. Later, when her mother runs away into the forest, leaving Liza with her abusive father. Liza then discovers she has the faerie ability to see into the past, and into the future, she must flee. With a magic shadow following her and an unwanted companion, she will try to journey to the Faerie world.

== Reception ==
Bones of Faerie was on the Spring 2009 Children's Indie Next List, and was a 2010 Best Books For Young Adults nominee, and a Popular Paperbacks for Young Adults nominee.

== Sequels ==
Bones of Faerie is the first book in a trilogy. The second book, Faerie Winter, was published April 5, 2011. The third and final book of the trilogy, Faerie After, was released May 28, 2013.
