= Janni Lee Simner =

American author

- Born: November 3, 1967 (age 59); New York City, U.S.
- Occupation: Author
- Spouse: Larry Hammer
- Writing career
- Genre: Fantasy
- Website: www.simner.com

Janni Lee Simner (born November 3, 1967, in New York City, US) is an American author of fantasy and adventure novels and short stories. She writes primarily for young adults as teenagers and upper elementary children.

== Appearances ==
She was involved in a number of panels and autograph signings at the 2007 North American Science Fiction Convention. On March 11–12, 2009, she was one of the four special guest authors for the Brandeis Book and Author Events at the Skyline Country Club in Arizona.

Simner was interviewed on CNN in relation to the essay she wrote for the anthology Dear Bully that had been a blog post that she had written about being bullied as a child. She discussed how she was contacted later in life online by one of her childhood bullies and they became friends. In response to the multiple child sexual abuse allegations made against by Marion Zimmer Bradley by her own children, Simner announced on June 13, 2014, that she would be donating advances from her two Darkover books, her Darkover royalties and at the request of her husband, Larry Hammer, payment for his sale to Bradley’s magazine to the American anti-sexual assault organization Rape, Abuse & Incest National Network.

== Personal life ==
She is married to the author Larry Hammer, and they reside in Arizona.

== Bibliography ==
=== Fiction novels ===
- Faerie After (May 2013)
- Faerie Winter (May 2011) - "Oddly, Liza's tale works despite the jumble of crowd-pleasing elements (post-apocalyptic dystopia, multigenerational faerie love stories, werewolf heartthrob). Graphic descriptions of murdered children push the story older than the reading level of its prose, but that just leaves it as an entertaining if quick adventure for those impatiently awaiting the next, heftier entry by Cassandra Clare or Julie Kagawa."
- Thief Eyes (2011) - "Simner’s second book, a fantasy set in modern times but rooted in ancient Icelandic sagas, has great reader appeal. Light, romantic fiction with an engaging fantasy punch."
- Bones of Faerie (2010) - "The setting, characters and plot are ones every fantasy and science-fiction reader has seen before: the dystopian world, evil faeries, a protagonist with extra-strong, extra-special magic, a hunt for a lost mother. Simner keeps things interesting with a fair amount of action and the constant introduction of new characters. The postapocalyptic environment is haunting but not downright scary—the most frightening things are the people, not the magic. With its dark, sharply imagined world, this will appeal to readers of Holly Black and Cassandra Clare."
- The Secret of the Three Treasures (2006), reissued as Tiernay West, Professional Adventurer (October 2013) - "Simner deftly tucks in clues, subplots and enough tongue-in-cheek humor to keep the suspense from turning scary. Fine fare for recent Cam Jansen and Encyclopedia Brown graduates."
- Ghost Vision (Phantom Rider) (1996)
- The Haunted Trail (Phantom Rider) (1996)
- Ghost Horse (Phantom Rider) (July 1996)

=== Fiction short stories ===
- Welcome to Bordertown anthology (Crossings) (2011)
- Seal Story (February 2011)
- What Fire Is (December 2008)
- Dragon Offerings (2008)
- Lost or Forgotten (November 2007)
- Invasive Species (2007)
- Heart's Desire (October 2006)
- Stone Tower (June 2006)
- Practical Villainy (February 2006)
- Song for Two Voices (December 2005)
- Water's Edge (September 2004)
- Advice (2003)
- Hanukkah Light (July 2001)
- Tearing Down the Unicorns (February 2000)
- Frog Princes (October 1999)
- Amanda's Room (March 1997)
- Alien Promises (November 1996)
- Windwood Rose (May 1996)
- Sarah's Window (April 1996)
- Drawing the Moon (1995) (collected in Bruce Coville's anthology Bruce Coville’s Book of Nightmares)
- Learning Magic (1994) (collected in Mike Resnick's alternate history anthology Alternate Outlaws)

== Awards ==
- Judy Goddard/Libraries, Ltd. Arizona Young Adult Author Award
