= Michelle Sagara =

Canadian writer

- Born: Michelle Michiko Sagara; May 5, 1963 (age 63); East York, Ontario, Canada
- Occupation: Fiction writer
- Writing career
- Genres: Fantasy, Science fiction

Michelle Michiko Sagara (born May 5, 1963) is a Canadian author of fantasy literature, active since the early 1990s. She has published as Michelle Sagara, as Michelle West (using her husband's surname) and as Michelle Sagara West. Sagara has received two nominations for the John W. Campbell Award.

She lives in Toronto and is employed part-time at Bakka-Phoenix, a local bookstore.

== Biography ==
Sagara is the eldest child of Japanese immigrants. As a child, Sagara loved reading Nancy Drew mysteries as well as the works of Enid Blyton and J. R. R. Tolkien. She studied physics, then English, at the University of Toronto before dropping out to pursue writing. After she married in 1990, she began publishing under Michelle West. Her debut book, Into the Dark Lands was published in 1991. She has said, in a 2008 interview: "I submitted the first novel to Del Rey books in 1987. It was rejected, but with a phone call, and in the end I revised the manuscript and sent it back. The revision was passed on to Lester del Rey, who was alive at the time. He rejected it with a four-page single space letter [that] had all the trademark curmudgeonliness for which he was famed. But buried in that four-page letter was a very definite 'This flashback of 94 pages needs to be its own damn book, and it should be book one.' So... I wrote that novel, and I submitted that novel, and that's the novel they bought."

== Bibliography ==
=== Novels ===
==== The Sundered ====
(as Michelle Sagara, Ballantine Books/Michelle Sagara West, BenBella Books)

1. Into the Dark Lands, 1991
2. Children of the Blood, 1992
3. Lady of Mercy, 1993
4. Chains of Darkness, Chains of Light, 1994

==== The Sacred Hunt ====
(as Michelle West, DAW Books)

1. Hunter's Oath (October 1995)
2. Hunter's Death (June 1996)

==== The Sun Sword ====
(as Michelle West, DAW Books)

The House War series intersects The Sun Sword series in the Essalieyan universe. Michelle Sagara published a synopsis of The Sun Sword series to give necessary background to readers of The House War.

1. The Broken Crown (July 1997)
2. The Uncrowned King (September 1998)
3. The Shining Court (August 1999)
4. Sea of Sorrows (May 2001)
5. The Riven Shield (July 2003)
6. The Sun Sword (January 2004)

==== The House War ====
(as Michelle West, DAW Books)

1. The Hidden City: A Novel of the House War, Book 1 (March 2008)
2. City of Night: A Novel of the House War, Book 2 (February 2010)
3. House Name: A Novel of the House War, Book 3 (January 2011)

The concluding volumes, beginning with Skirmish, take place after events of The Sun Sword.

1. Skirmish: A Novel of the House War, Book 4 (January 2012)
2. Battle: A Novel of the House War, Book 5 (December 2012)
3. Oracle: A Novel of the House War, Book 6 (May 2015)
4. Firstborn: A Novel of the House War, Book 7 (February 2019)
5. War: A Novel of the House War, Book 8 (June 2019)

==== The Burning Crown ====
(as Michelle West, self-published)

1. Hunter's Redoubt (October 2023)
2. The Wild Road (June 2025)
3. The Winter Prince (forthcoming, 2027/2028)

==== Chronicles of Elantra ====
(as Michelle Sagara, Luna Books)

1. Cast in Shadow (August 2005)
2. Cast in Courtlight (July 2006)
3. Cast in Secret (August 2007)
4. Cast in Fury (October 2008)
5. Cast in Silence (August 2009)
6. Cast in Chaos (August 2010)
7. Cast in Ruin (October 2011)
8. Cast in Peril (September 2012)
9. Cast in Sorrow (October 2013)
10. Cast in Flame (July 2014)
11. Cast in Honor (November 2015)
12. Cast in Flight (October 2016)
13. Cast in Deception (January 2018)
14. Cast in Oblivion (January 2019)
15. Cast in Wisdom (January 2020)
16. Cast in Conflict (June 2021)
17. Cast in Eternity (November 2022)
18. Cast in Atonement (August 2024)
19. Cast in Blood (Forthcoming April 2026)

Cast in Moonlight is a novella that was first published in Harvest Moon, a short story collection released by Luna Books in 2010, and later became available as a stand-alone work.

The Chronicles of Elantra have also been made available as audio books.

==== The Academia Chronicles ====
(as Michelle Sagara, Mira Books)

1. Shards of Glass (November 2023)
2. Heir of Light (May 2025)

==== The Wolves of Elantra ====
(as Michelle Sagara, Mira Books)

1. The Emperor's Wolves (October 2020)
2. Sword and Shadow (February 2022)

==== Queen of the Dead ====
(as Michelle Sagara, DAW Books)

1. Silence (May 2012)
2. Touch (January 2014)
3. Grave (February 2017)

=== Short stories ===
- "For Love of God" (1993) (in Mike Resnick's alternate history anthology Alternate Warriors)
- "What She Won't Remember" (1994) (in Mike Resnick's alternate history anthology Alternate Outlaws)
- "The Sword in the Stone" (1997) (in Mike Resnick's alternate history anthology Alternate Tyrants)
- "Dust" (2000) (in How I Survived My Summer Vacation, a Buffy the Vampire Slayer anthology)
- Speaking with Angels (as Michelle West) - a collection of short stories (2003)

Other short stories by Michelle Sagara West have appeared in magazines and anthologies under a variety of surnames.

"Sigurne" is a short story created from material that was edited out of ORACLE. Michelle Sagara has made the short story available for free download in PDF format on her website.

=== Review columns and blog ===
Under the name Michelle West, Sagara writes a long running book review column, Musing on Books, for The Magazine of Fantasy & Science Fiction. As of the end of 2019, she has written 56 columns.
