= Martha Soukup =

American writer

Martha Soukup (born 20 July 1959 in Aurora, Illinois) is a science fiction author and playwright for the Monday Night PlayGround emerging playwrights group. In 2003, she won their annual June Anne Baker Prize commission.

The 1994 short film Override, directed by Danny Glover, was based on her short story "Over the Long Haul".

== Biography ==
She attended the Clarion science fiction writing workshop in 1985, with such other emerging SF talents as Robert J. Howe, Geoffrey A. Landis, Kristine Kathryn Rusch, William Shunn, and Mary Turzillo.

She lives in San Francisco, California.

== Collections ==
- Rosemary's Brain: And Other Tales of Wonder (1992)

Wildside Press - ISBN 1-880448-08-4
With introduction by John Gregory Betancourt.

- Arbitrary Placement of Walls (1997)

Dreamhaven Books - ISBN 0-9630944-9-1 (Hardback) - ISBN 0-9630944-8-3 (Paperback)
Contains the Nebula-award winning story "A Defense of the Social Contracts". With introduction by Neil Gaiman.

== Short-stories ==
- Plowshare - (1992) (collected in Mike Resnick's alternate history anthology Alternate Presidents)
- Rosemary’s Brain - (1992) (collected in Mike Resnick's alternate history anthology Alternate Kennedys)
- Good Girl, Bad Dog - (1994) (collected in Mike Resnick's alternate history anthology Alternate Outlaws)

== Awards and nominations ==
- 1991: Nominee, Hugo Award for Best Novelette for "Over the Long Haul"
- 1991: Nominee, Nebula Award for Best Novelette for "Over the Long Haul"
- 1992: Nominee, Hugo Award for Best Short Story for "Dog's Life"
- 1992: Nominee, Nebula Award for Best Short Story for "Dog's Life"
- 1993: Nominee, World Fantasy Award for Best Short Fiction for "The Arbitrary Placement of Walls"
- 1993: Nominee, Hugo Award for Best Short Story for "The Arbitrary Placement of Walls"
- 1993: Nominee, Nebula Award for Best Short Story for "The Arbitrary Placement of Walls"
- 1994: Nominee, Nebula Award for Best Novelette for "Things Not Seen"
- 1994: Nominee, Hugo Award for Best Short Story for "The Story So Far"
- 1995: Winner, Nebula Award for Best Short Story for "A Defense of the Social Contracts"
