= Brian Thomsen =

American science fiction author

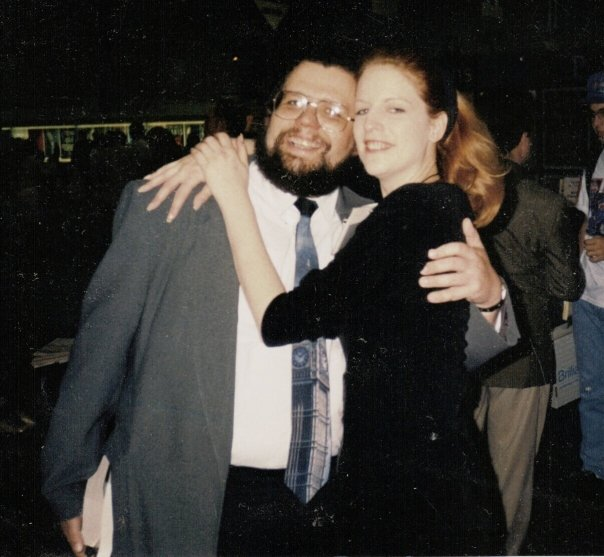
- Brian Thomsen and SF/Fantasy book cover model, Lisa Feerick Pollison at the 1994 ABA Book Expo in downtown Los Angeles.
- Born: Brian Michael Thomsen; April 13, 1959
- Died: September 21, 2008 (aged 49); Brooklyn, New York, United States
- Occupation: Writer

Brian Michael Thomsen (April 13, 1959 – September 21, 2008) was an American science fiction editor, author, and anthologist.

== Biography ==
Thomsen was raised in the New York City neighborhood of Rockaway Beach and attended Regis High School in Manhattan.

He was a founding editor of Warner Books' Questar Science Fiction line, in which position he was nominated for the 1988 Hugo Award for Best Professional Editor.

In the mid-90s, Thomsen served as managing fiction editor at TSR, Inc. He also worked at one point as the publisher for TSR's Periodicals Department. He authored two Forgotten Realms tie-in novels, in 1995 and 1996. His tenure at TSR was controversial. In the 1980s, TSR had developed a reputation for underpaying its authors compared to the major fiction publishers in New York. Mary Kirchoff, who eventually came to lead the Books Department, had spearheaded changes to increase author compensation so as to better retain talent. Kirchoff instituted a sliding royalty system where the better books sold, the more of a share of royalties the author would receive, a gesture to keep the most valuable talent happy. Kirchoff left TSR in early 1992, and Thomsen was hired to replace her. According to Jim Lowder, then a part of TSR's fiction department, Thomsen was expected by others to move TSR's fiction department closer in policy to that of the New York publishing houses he had come from, and continue increasing author compensation and prestige. Thomsen surprised Lowder and others by doing the reverse: he moved to slash author royalties, reduce or eliminate author advances, and end recruiting new authors from the slush pile of unsolicited fan offerings. He theatrically made his point by throwing slush submissions into a garbage can at a departmental meeting. Thomsen's changes led to a breakdown in relations with a number of its authors, most notably star author R. A. Salvatore who stopped publishing his popular Drizzt series with TSR after refusing to agree to Thomsen's contract demands. Lowder himself had a finished book, The Screaming Tower, trapped in limbo where Thomsen refused to relinquish the rights to it, but also refused to publish it. Ben Riggs, an author who studied TSR's financial problems, considered Thomsen's changes disastrous and self-defeating for one of TSR's most important and lucrative departments. After Wizards of the Coast purchased a bankrupt TSR in 1997, Thomsen was fired from his position, Mary Kirchoff was rehired, and Wizards set about reversing the bonds broken in Thomsen's tenure, notably including luring Salvatore back to work with the Forgotten Realms again.

Thomsen wrote more than 30 short stories for various anthologies. He was a collaborator with longtime DC Comics managing editor Julius Schwartz on Schwartz's autobiography. He was also a consulting editor for publisher Tor Books.

He died on September 21, 2008, at his home in Brooklyn, New York at the age of 49. He was survived by his wife, Donna.

== Bibliography ==
=== Novels ===
- Once Around the Realms, 1995
- The Mage in the Iron Mask, 1996

=== Anthologies ===
- The Reel Stuff, 1998
- A Date Which Will Live in Infamy, with Martin H. Greenberg, 2001
- Oceans of Magic, with Martin H. Greenberg, 2001
- Alternate Gettysburgs, with Martin H. Greenberg, 2002
- The American Fantasy Tradition, 2002
- Oceans of Space, with Martin H. Greenberg, 2002
- The Repentant, with Martin H. Greenberg, 2003
- A Yuletide Universe, 2003
- Blue & Gray at Sea, 2004
- Masters of Fantasy, with Bill Fawcett, 2004

=== Nonfiction ===
- Man of Two Worlds, with Julius Schwartz, 2000

=== Short stories ===
- "Gloria Remembers," Alternate Kennedys, 1992
- "The Missing Thirty-Fifth President," Alternate Kennedys, 1992
- "Paper Trail," Alternate Presidents, 1992
- "Reunion," Grails: Quests of the Dawn, 1992
- "The Case of the Skinflint's Specters," Christmas Ghosts, 1993
- "A Sense of Loyalty, a Sense of Betrayal," Alternate Warriors, 1993
- "Bigger Than U.S. Steel," Alternate Outlaws, 1994
- "Iguanacon, Too," Alternate Worldcons, 1994
- "A Night on the Plantation," By Any Other Fame, 1994
- "Infallibility, Obedience & Acts of Contrition," Alternate Tyrants, 1997
- "Oscar Night at Swifty's," Alternate Skiffy, 1997
- "Bloodstained Ground," Alternate Generals, 1998
- "Dearest Kitty," Legends: Tales from the Eternal Archives, 1999
- "Mouse the Magic Guy," Merlin, 1999
- "Fragment of the Log of Captain Amasa Delano," Oceans of Space, 2002
- "The Grand Tour," Sol's Children, 2002
- "It's a Wonderful Miracle on 34th Street's Christmas Carol," A Yuletide Universe, 2002
