= Jack C. Haldeman II =

American novelist (1941–2002)

Jack Carroll "Jay" Haldeman II (December 18, 1941 – January 1, 2002) was an American biologist and science-fiction writer. He was the older brother of SF writer and MIT writing professor Joe Haldeman.

== Biography ==
Jack Haldeman studied environmental engineering and biology at the University of Oklahoma, and received a degree from Johns Hopkins University. His scientific career included work in parasitology, field studies of whales in the Canadian Arctic, study of the greenhouse effect, and coordination of a website and a CD-ROM relating to agriculture in Florida. The tapeworm Hymenolepis haldemani was named after him.

Haldeman published at least 75 short stories, beginning with "Garden of Eden" in the magazine Fantastic (December 1971). He is notable for writing science fiction with sports themes; "Home Team Advantage", first appearing in Isaac Asimov's Science Fiction Magazine in 1977, has been anthologized a number of times. "High Steel", a 1982 story co-authored with Jack Dann, was a Nebula Award nominee; it was later expanded into a novel.

Haldeman became a member of the Science Fiction Writers of America in 1971, and went on to chair eight SF conventions. He was married to writer Barbara Delaplace; they collaborated on stories beginning with "That'll be the Day" in the anthology Alternate Tyrants.

Haldeman died of cancer in 2002, at the Hospice of North Central Florida in his hometown of Gainesville, Florida.

== Bibliography ==
=== Novels ===
- Vector Analysis (G. P. Putnam's Sons 1978; Berkley Books 1980; Ace Books 1984 ISBN 0-441-86071-0)
- Perry's Planet (Bantam Books 1980, ISBN 0-553-13580-5)
- The Fall of Winter (Baen Books 1985, ISBN 0-671-55947-8)
- There Is No Darkness (1983, with Joe Haldeman; Ace Books 1986, ISBN 0-441-80567-1)
- Echoes of Thunder (1991, with Jack Dann)
- High Steel (Tor Books 1993, with Jack Dann, ISBN 0-312-93163-8)

=== Short stories ===
- "We, The People" (1983) (collected in ANALOG and archived in Wayback Machine)
- "The 1960 Presidential Campaign, Considered as a World Wrestling Federation Steel Cage Match or Short Count in Chicago" (1992) (collected in Mike Resnick's alternate history anthology Alternate Kennedys)
- "The Cold Warrior" (1993) (collected in Mike Resnick's alternate history anthology Alternate Warriors)
- "Death of a Dream" (1993) (also collected in Alternate Warriors)
- "Ma Teresa and the Hole-in-the-Wall Gang" (1994) (collected in Mike Resnick's alternate history anthology Alternate Outlaws)
- "That'll Be the Day" (1997) (cowritten with Barbara Delaplace and collected in Mike Resnick's alternate history anthology Alternate Tyrants)

=== Series ===
Star Trek Adventures

- 4. Perry's Planet (Bantam Books 1984, ISBN 0-553-13580-5;1996; reissued 1996, ISBN 0-553-24193-1)

Spaceways

- 11. The Iceworld Connection (1983; as "John Cleve" a collaborative pen name with Jack Dann)

Bill, the Galactic Hero

- 5. ...on the Planet of Zombie Vampires (1991; with Harry Harrison)

=== Anthologies with Jack Haldeman stories ===
- Alternities (1974)
- TV: 2000 (1982)
- 100 Great Fantasy Short Short Stories (1984)
- Shadows 7 (1984)
- First Contact (1987)
- Alternate Warriors (1993)
- By Any Other Fame (1993)
- Alternate Worldcons (1994)
- Bruce Coville's Book of Aliens: Tales to Warp Your Mind (1994)
- Deals with the Devil (1994)
- Warriors of Blood and Dream (1995)
- Alternate Tyrants (Tom Doherty Associates 1997, ISBN 0-8125-4835-3)
- Asimov's Choice Astronauts & Androids (1977)
- Asimov's Choice Comets & Computers (1978)
