= Tappan Wright King =

American writer

- Born: 1950 (age 75–76)
- Occupations: Editor, author

Tappan Wright King (born 1950) is an American editor and author in the field of fantasy fiction, best known for editing The Twilight Zone Magazine and its companion publication Night Cry in the late 1980s. Much of his work has appeared under a shorter form of his name, Tappan King. He is the grandson of legal scholar and utopian novelist Austin Tappan Wright and the husband of author and editor Beth Meacham. He and his wife live near Tucson, Arizona.

== Life, education and family ==
King was born in 1950, the son of Lowell and Phyllis (Wright) King. He attended Antioch College in Yellow Springs, Ohio, where he met his wife, Beth Meacham. They were married in 1978, and in 1980 bought a house on Staten Island, which they spent eight years rehabilitating. They moved to northeast Tucson, Arizona in 1989, where they resided for 14 years, after which they moved to a 4-acre (16,000 m^{2}) ranch south of Tucson close to the village of Corona de Tucson. They keep cats and horses.

== Literary career ==
In the late 1970s and early 1980s King and his wife were regular reviewers for Baird Searles' and Martin Last's SF Review Monthly. He was a consulting editor at Bantam Books from 1980 to 1985, helping to found the Bantam Spectra imprint, after which he was editor-in-chief of The Twilight Zone Magazine from March, 1986 until its last issue (February, 1989), and editorial director of its shorter-lived companion title Night Cry to its last issue in Fall 1987. He has since worked as a consultant technical writer and editor.

King has written one novel with Beth Meacham, Nightshade (1976, Pyramid), and one children's novel with Viido Polikarpus, Down Town (1985, Arbor House), in addition to a number of short stories on his own. His work has appeared in the magazines Crimmer's: The Harvard Journal of Pictorial Fiction, Ariel, a fantasy magazine, SF Review Monthly, Galaxy Science Fiction, Locus, Rod Serling's The Twilight Zone Magazine, Night Cry, and Asimov's, and anthologies Devils & Demons (Marvin Kaye, ed., 1987), Alternate Presidents (Mike Resnick, ed., 1992), Alternate Warriors (Mike Resnick, ed., 1993), More Whatdunits (Mike Resnick, ed., 1993), A Wizard's Dozen (Michael Stearns, ed., 1993), Alternate Outlaws (Mike Resnick, ed., 1994), Xanadu 2 (Jane Yolen and Martin H. Greenberg, eds., 1994), and The Armless Maiden and Other Tales for Childhood's Survivors (Terri Windling, ed., 1995).

== Bibliography ==
=== Novels ===
- Nightshade (with Beth Meacham) (1976)
- Down Town (with Viido Polikarpus) (1985)

=== Short stories ===
- "Fearn" (1978)
- "Boogie Man" (1987)
- "Patriot's Dream" (1992) (collected in Mike Resnick's alternate history anthology Alternate Presidents in 1992)
- "Come Hither" (1993)
- "Flight of Reason" (1993)
- "The Mark of the Angel" (1993) (collected in Mike Resnick's alternate history anthology Alternate Warriors)
- "A Most Obedient Cat" (1994)
- "The Crimson Rose" (1994) (collected in Mike Resnick's alternate history anthology Alternate Outlaws)
- "Wolf's Heart" (1995)

=== Nonfiction ===
- The Art of Robert McCall: A Celebration of Our Future in Space (with Robert McCall) (1992)
- "The Image in Motion" (1975)
- "Will the Real Bruce Wayne Please Stand Up?: Chronicle of an Ongoing Identity Crisis" (1976)
- "Introduction (Islandian Tale: The Story of Alwina)" (1981)
- "Profile: Stephen Jay Gould" (1982)
- "Illuminations" (1986)
- "In the Twilight Zone" (1986)
- "The State of the Art" (1986)
- "Illuminations: A Little Night Music" (1987)
- "Illuminations: Dreamland" (1987)
- "Illuminations: Eternal Evil" (1987)
- "Illuminations: Latin Lama" (1987)
- "Illuminations: Leaps of Faith" (1987)
- "Illuminations: Magic Underfoot" (1987)
- "Illuminations: The Creature from the Silt in the Black Lagoon" (1987)
- "In the Twilight Zone" (1987)
- "In the Twilight Zone" (1987)
- "In the Twilight Zone" (1987)
- "In the Twilight Zone" (1987)
- "In the Twilight Zone" (1987)
- "In the Twilight Zone" (1987)
- "The Other Side: Elephant Parts" (1987)
- "The Twilight Zone Gallery: The Art of Jim Burns" (1987)
- "Editor's Notes" (1988)
- "Editor's Notes" (1988)
- "Illuminations: And Now...Twilight Zone - The Game" (1988)
- "Illuminations: Road to the Stars" (1988)
- "Illuminations: The Journey of a Thousand Li" (1988)
- "Illuminations: The Winds of Chaos" (1988)
- "In the Twilight Zone" (1988)
- "In the Twilight Zone" (1988)
- "In the Twilight Zone" (1988)
- "In the Twilight Zone" (1988)
- "In the Twilight Zone" (1988)
- "In the Twilight Zone" (1988)
- "Other Dimensions: Lost in the Stars?" (1988)
- "The Twilight Zone Review: 1987" (1988)
- "Editor's Notes: Inspiration" (1989)
- "Editor's Notes: Still Crazy After All These Years" (1989)
- "Editor's Notes: Synergy" (1989)
- "In the Twilight Zone" (1989)
- "In the Twilight Zone: Television Land" (1989)
- "The Twilight Zone Review 1988" (1989)
- "The Sobering Saga of Myrtle the Manuscript: A Cautionary Tale" (1991, rev. 1997)
- "In Memoriam: Baird Searles, 1936-1993" (with Beth Meacham) (1993)
- "The Story I Hadn't Planned to Write" (1995)
