= James D. Macdonald =

American novelist

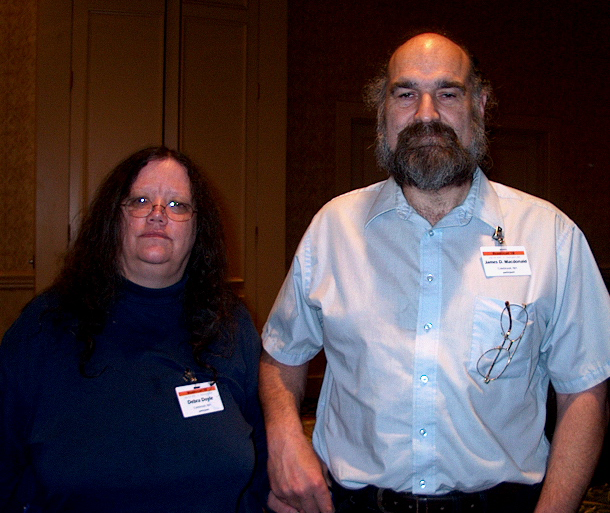
- Jim Macdonald and Debra Doyle at Readercon
- Born: James Douglas Ignatius Macdonald; February 22, 1954 (age 72); White Plains, New York, U.S.
- Occupation: Writer
- Writing career
- Pen name: Robyn Tallis, Nicholas Adams, Victor Appleton, Douglas Morgan, Martin Delrio
- Period: 1990s to present
- Genres: fantasy, science fiction, mystery
- Website: madhousemanor.com

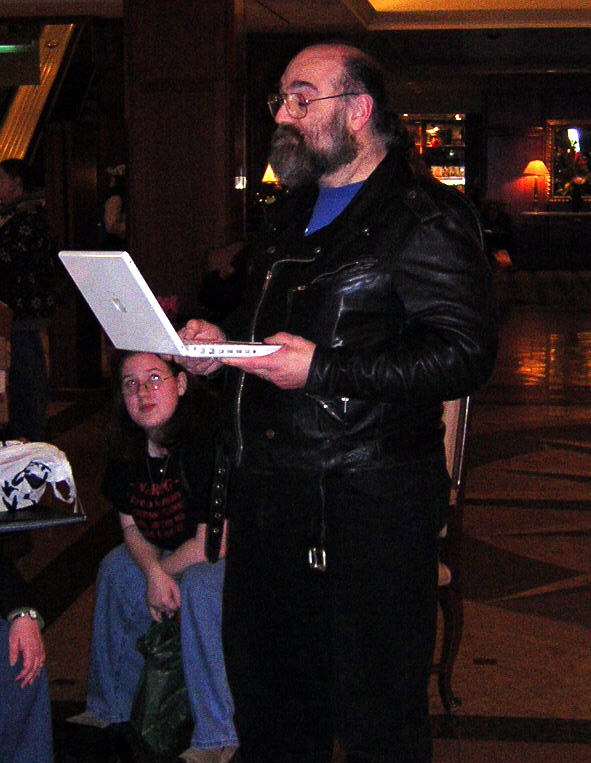
Jim Macdonald reads at Boskone 43, 2006

James Douglas Ignatius Macdonald (born 1954) is an American author and critic who lives in New Hampshire. He frequently collaborated with his late wife Dr. Debra Doyle. He works in several genres, concentrating on fantasy, but also writing science fiction, and mystery and media tie-ins.

== Biography ==
Macdonald was born in 1954, and raised in White Plains, New York. He attended the University of Rochester, and went on to serve in the US Navy for fifteen years. He has been writing professionally since the early 1990s and has published 35 novels.

== Educational work ==
Macdonald is well known for his work in educating aspiring authors, particularly for his advice on avoiding literary scams. Early in his career, he was asked by such an author how much he had paid to have his books published, and in response began a campaign of educating other writers about the problems of vanity publishers. As part of this campaign, he coined Yog's Law, which states "Money should flow toward the author." This rule is named after "Yog Sysop", a nickname of Macdonald that refers to Yog-Sothoth. It is often quoted by professional authors such as John Scalzi and Teresa Nielsen Hayden when giving advice on finding an agent and getting published.

=== Atlanta Nights and PublishAmerica ===
One target of his campaign is PublishAmerica, a company that claims not to be a vanity publisher but a "traditional publisher" that accepts or rejects books based on their quality. Macdonald organized a group of professional authors to test whether that company was actually reading any submissions for clarity and realism before accepting them. One day after Macdonald issued a press release announcing that PublishAmerica had accepted a manuscript that was created to be as bad as possible, the company withdrew the offer to publish it.

== Awards and honors ==
Knight's Wyrd was awarded the Mythopoeic Fantasy Award for Children's Literature, 1992, and named to the New York Public Library Books for the Teen Age list in 1993. In 1997, he was awarded Best Young-Adult Science Fiction by the Science Fiction Chronicle for Groogleman.

== Select bibliography ==
This bibliography is based on Macdonald's entry on the Internet Speculative Fiction Database.

=== Novels ===
- The Apocalypse Door, Tor (New York, NY), 2002. ISBN 978-0312869885

=== Novels with Debra Doyle ===
- (Under pseudonym Robyn Tallis) Night of Ghosts and Lightning ("Planet Builders" series), Ivy, 1989. ISBN 978-0804102025
- (Under pseudonym Robyn Tallis) Zero-Sum Games ("Planet Builders" series), Ivy, 1989. ISBN 978-0804102070
- (Under pseudonym Nicholas Adams) Pep Rally ("Horror High" series), HarperCollins, 1991 ISBN 978-0061060847
- (Under pseudonym Victor Appleton) Monster Machine ("Tom Swift" series), Pocket Books (New York, NY), 1991. ISBN 978-0671678272
- (Under pseudonym Victor Appleton) Aquatech Warriors ("Tom Swift" series), Pocket Books (New York, NY), 1991. ISBN 978-0671678289
- Timecrime, Inc. ("Robert Silverberg's 'Time Tours'" series), Harper (New York, NY), 1991. ISBN 978-0061060144
- Night of the Living Rat ("Daniel Pinkwater's 'Melvinge of the Megaverse'" series), Ace Books (New York, NY), 1992. ISBN 978-0441910793
- Knight's Wyrd, Harcourt, Brace (New York, NY), 1992. ISBN 978-0152007645
- Groogleman, Harcourt, Brace (New York, NY), 1996. ISBN 978-0152002350
- Requiem for Boone (based on the television series Gene Roddenberry's Earth—Final Conflict), Tor (New York, NY), 2000. ISBN 978-0312874612
- (As Douglas Morgan) Tiger Cruise, Forge (New York, NY), 2000. ISBN 978-0312870423
- (As Douglas Morgan) What Do You Do with a Drunken Sailor? (nonfiction), Swordsmith, 2002. ISBN 978-1931013093
- Land of Mist and Snow, Eos, 2006. ISBN 978-0060819194
- Lincoln's Sword, HarperCollins, 2010 ISBN 978-0060819279

=== Circle of Magic series, with Debra Doyle ===
- School of Wizardry, Troll (Metuchen, NJ), 1990. ISBN 978-0816769360
- Tournament and Tower/The Secret of the Tower, Troll (Metuchen, NJ), 1990. ISBN 978-0816718290
- City by the Sea/The Wizard's Statue, Troll (Metuchen, NJ), 1990. ISBN 978-0816718313
- The Prince's Players/Danger in the Palace, Troll (Metuchen, NJ), 1990. ISBN 978-0816718337
- The Prisoners of Bell Castle/The Wizard's Castle, Troll (Metuchen, NJ), 1990. ISBN 978-0816718351
- The High King's Daughter, Troll (Metuchen, NJ), 1990. ISBN 978-0816769971

=== Mageworlds series ===
Written with Debra Doyle, Mageworlds is a space opera novel series originally published in the 1990s and re-issued as e-books in 2012.

1. The Price of the Stars, Tor Books (New York), 1992. ISBN 978-0812517040
2. Starpilot's Grave, Tor, 1993. ISBN 978-0812517057
3. By Honor Betray'd, Tor, 1994. ISBN 978-0812517064
4. The Gathering Flame, Tor, 1995. ISBN 978-0812534955
5. The Long Hunt, Tor, 1996. ISBN 978-0812534962
6. The Stars Asunder, Tor, 1999. ISBN 978-0312864101
7. A Working of Stars, Tor, 2002. ISBN 978-0312864118

=== Bad Blood series, with Debra Doyle ===
- Bad Blood, Berkley (New York, NY), 1993. ISBN 978-0425139530
- Hunters' Moon, Berkley (New York, NY), 1994. ISBN 978-0425143629
- Judgment Night, Berkley (New York, NY), 1995. ISBN 978-0425147283

=== Under joint pseudonym "Martin Delrio", with Debra Doyle ===
- Mortal Kombat (movie novelization), Tor (New York, NY), 1995. ISBN 978-0812544527
- Midnight Justice (Spider-Man Super-Thriller series), Byron Preiss (New York, NY), 1996. ISBN 978-0671568511
- Global War (Spider-Man Super-Thriller series), Byron Preiss (New York, NY), 1996. ISBN 978-0671007997
- Harold R. Foster's Prince Valiant (movie novelization), Avon (New York, NY), 1998. ISBN 978-0380794058
- The Loch Ness Monster (nonfiction), Rosen Publishing (New York, NY), 2002. ISBN 978-0823935642
- A Silence in the Heavens (novel; MechWarrior: Dark Age series), Roc (New York, NY), 2003. ISBN 978-0451459329
- Truth and Shadows (novel; MechWarrior: Dark Age series), Roc (New York, NY), 2003. ISBN 978-0451459381
- Service for the Dead (novel; MechWarrior: Dark Age series), Roc (New York, NY), 2003. ISBN 978-0451459435

=== Short stories ===
- Rosemary: Scrambled Eggs on a Blue Plate, Tor, 1992 (co-written with Alan Rodgers and collected in Mike Resnick's alternate history anthology Alternate Kennedys)
- Now And in the Hour of Death, Tor, 1992 (co-written with Debra Doyle and also collected in Mike Resnick's alternate history anthology Alternate Kennedys)
- Souvenirs, Tor, 1992 (co-written with Alan Rodgers and collected in Mike Resnick's alternate history anthology Alternate Outlaws)
