= China Mountain Zhang =

1992 novel by Maureen F. McHugh

- Cover of 1993 Tor paperback edition
- Author: Maureen F. McHugh
- Language: English
- Genre: Science fiction
- Publisher: Tor Books
- Publication date: March 1992
- Publication place: United States
- Media type: Print (hardback & paperback)
- Pages: 313
- Awards: James Tiptree Jr. Award; Lambda Literary Award; Locus Award
- ISBN: 0-312-85271-1
- OCLC: 24670648
- Dewey Decimal: 813/.54 20
- LC Class: PS3563.C3687 C48

China Mountain Zhang is a 1992 science fiction novel by American writer Maureen F. McHugh. The novel is made up of several stories loosely intertwined. The novel was nominated for multiple major awards, including the Hugo Award and the Nebula Award, and won the Locus Award for Best First Novel.

== Title ==
The novel's title derives from the name of the protagonist, a young gay man of mixed Chinese and Hispanic ancestry who goes by the name Rafael Zhang in non-Chinese contexts and Zhang Zhongshan in Chinese contexts. His Chinese given name, "Zhongshan", is written with the characters that have the primary meanings "center" and "mountain"; the Mandarin name for China also begins with the character meaning "center" or "middle". Thus, "China Mountain" is an alternate reading of his Chinese given name. As the novel explains, "Zhongshan" was one of the given names used by the Chinese revolutionary leader Sun Yat-sen, for whom the character is named.

== Plot summary ==
The main story involves a man's maturation in a future dominated by China, where the United States has undergone a Second Great Depression, a Communist revolution and then a "Cleansing Winds Campaign" that resembled the Chinese Cultural Revolution. His personal evolution is paralleled in four interwoven side stories following characters progressing from outsiderdom to finding places in society.

== Allusions/references to actual history, geography and current science ==
The backdrop is a 22nd-century in which the Chinese Communist regime dominates the world. The novel is slightly unusual for science fiction in that none of the characters cause any significant change in the world around them; nor does it use any standard science fiction tropes.

The New York Times said of the book when it first appeared: "A first novel this good gives every reader a chance to share in the pleasure of discovery; to my mind, Ms. McHugh's achievement recalls the best work of Samuel R. Delany and Kim Stanley Robinson without being in the least derivative."

== Connections to other works ==
McHugh's short story "Protection" is set in the same future history as China Mountain Zhang, detailing the experiences of a petty criminal in a "Reform Through Labor" camp in Kansas under the future Communist system.

== Awards and nominations ==
| Year | Award | Category | Result | Ref. |
|---|---|---|---|---|
| 1993 | James Tiptree Jr. Award | - | Won | |
| 1993 | Lambda Literary Award | Gay Men's Science Fiction/Fantasy | Won | |
| 1993 | Hugo Award | Novel | Nominated | |
| 1993 | Locus Award | First Novel | Won | |
| 1993 | Locus Award | Science Fiction Novel | 24th | |
| 1993 | Nebula Award | Novel | Nominated | |
| 1999 | Gaylactic Spectrum Awards | Hall of Fame | Inducted | |

== See also ==
- Mission Child – Another science fiction novel by McHugh with LGBTQ themes
