= Debra Doyle =

American writer (1952–2020)

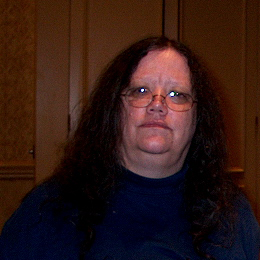
- Debra Doyle at Readercon 2007
- Born: November 30, 1952
- Died: October 31, 2020 (aged 67)
- Education: University of Pennsylvania (PhD)
- Occupation: Writer
- Writing career
- Period: 1990–2020
- Genres: Fantasy, science fiction, mystery
- Website: doyleandmacdonald.com

Debra Doyle (November 30, 1952 – October 31, 2020) was an American author in multiple related fiction genres, including science fiction, fantasy, and mystery, for young adults and adults. Her works were co-written with her husband, James D. Macdonald.

== Life and career ==
Doyle was born in Florida and grew up in Texas. Doyle earned a PhD from the University of Pennsylvania with a dissertation on Old English poetry. She married Macdonald in 1978.

Her first work written with Macdonald was "Bad Blood" in 1988. Their novel Knight's Wyrd was awarded the Mythopoeic Fantasy Award for Children's Literature in 1992 and appeared on the New York Public Library Books for the Teen Age list in 1993. They published two series, Mageworlds (7 novels) and The Wizard Apprentice (8 novels), and two alternate history novels, Land of Mist and Snow and Lincoln's Sword.

Doyle and Macdonald also published together under other names. They published their first novel, Night of Ghosts and Lightning, in 1989 under the house name Robyn Tallis; two Tom Swift novels under the house name Victor Appleton; Pep Rally, Blood Brothers, and Vampire’s Kiss under the house name Nicholas Adams; and two Spider-Man and three Battletech novels as Martin Delrio.

Together Doyle and Macdonald made up part of the core membership of the sff.net website and rec.arts.sff newsgroup. Doyle also taught at the Viable Paradise genre writer's workshop on Martha's Vineyard.

She died of cardiac arrest on October 31, 2020.

== Bibliography ==
A full list of her contributions and work can be found on the Fantastic Fiction site.

=== Series ===
==== Circle of Magic (with James D Macdonald) ====
1. School of Wizardry (1990)
2. Tournament and Tower (1990); reissued as Secret of the Tower (2000)
3. City by the Sea (1990); reissued as The Wizard's Statue (2000)
4. The Prince's Players (1990); reissued as Danger In The Palace (2000)
5. The Prisoners of Bell Castle (1990); reissued as The Wizard's Castle (1999)
6. The High King's Daughter (1990)

==== Tom Swift (Fourth Series) (with James D Macdonald) ====
- Monster Machine (1991)
- Aquatech Warriors (1991)

==== MageWorlds (with James D Macdonald) ====
1. The Price of the Stars (1992)
2. Starpilot's Grave (1993)
3. By Honor Betray'd (1994)
4. The Gathering Flame (1995)
5. The Long Hunt (1996)
6. The Stars Asunder (1999)
7. A Working of Stars (2002)
- A Death in the Working (2004); a Mageworlds short story
- On Suivi Point (2005); a Mageworlds novelette

==== Bad Blood (with James D Macdonald) ====
1. Bad Blood (1993)
2. Hunter's Moon (1994)
3. Judgement Night (1995)
- Bad Blood: A Short Story (2011)

==== Peter Crossman (with James D Macdonald) ====
- The Confessions of Peter Crossman (2010)
- The Devil in the Details (2014)

==== Orville Nesbit (with James D Macdonald) ====
- Ecdysis (2011)

=== Novels ===
- Knight's Wyrd (1992) (with James D Macdonald)
- Groogleman (1996) (with James D Macdonald)
- Prince Valiant (1998) (with Hal Foster and James D Macdonald)
- Land of Mist and Snow (2006) (with James D Macdonald)
- Lincoln's Sword (2010) (with James D Macdonald)

=== Short stories (selection) ===
- "Now And in the Hour of Death" (co-written with James D. Macdonald and collected in Mike Resnick's alternate history anthology Alternate Kennedys)
- "Witch Garden" co-written with James D. Macdonald (1994)
- "Please to See the King" co-written with James D. Macdonald (1995)
- "Ecdysis" co-written with James D. Macdonald (1996)
- "Ghosts and Legends" (with James D. Macdonald) (2012)
