= The Lincoln Train =

- Short story by Maureen F. McHugh
- Country: United States
- Language: English
- Genre: Science fiction

Publication
- Published in: The Magazine of Fantasy & Science Fiction; Alternate Tyrants; Best of the Best: 20 Years of the Year's Best Science Fiction
- Publication type: Magazine
- Publication date: April 1995

"The Lincoln Train" is an alternate history short story by Maureen F. McHugh that was first published in April 1995. It is collected in volume 31 of the Nebula Awards anthologies, in Alternate Tyrants (1997), and in Best of the Best: 20 Years of the Year's Best Science Fiction (2005).

== Plot summary ==
The story follows Clara Corbett, a teen-aged girl from Mississippi who is being forcibly removed from her home following the end of the American Civil War. Clara is from a slave-owning family, and is boarding the train with her mother when the latter suddenly dies. Travelling alone, Clara is approached by Elizabeth Loudon, and they travel together to St. Louis. Clara initially fears that Elizabeth is an adventuress who will kidnap her and take her to parts unknown, but she is a Quaker and a member of an Underground Railroad network that rescues people in Clara's situation. Clara journeys with her, her final destination being her sister Julia's home in Tennessee. As she tries to offer help to the Quakers, however, Elizabeth grows cold and rebuffs her, stating that "there are no slavers in [their] ranks."

== Alternate history ==
The point of divergence from history occurs on April 14, 1865, when John Wilkes Booth's bullet fails to kill Abraham Lincoln. Instead, it leaves Lincoln in a vegetative state and thus incapable of governing the nation. Secretary of State William H. Seward is widely believed to be the true national policy maker. Seward instigates a harsh policy of removing all Southerners who had owned slaves to the western territories in a neo-Trail of Tears, where many of them are left to die of starvation and disease. The brevity of the story, and the limit of its narrative viewpoint to one young girl in a remote province, do not allow this alternate history to be examined in any great depth.

== Author's comment ==
In her letter accompanying the story in volume 31 of the Nebula Awards collection, Maureen McHugh states that she originally intended to write a story from Lincoln's perspective, but after reading his speeches and letters, felt incapable of "capturing the man on paper," and so kept him "offstage."

== Reception ==
"Train" won the 1996 Hugo Award for Best Short Story and the 1996 Locus Award. It was also nominated for the 1996 Nebula Award for Best Short Story.

== Historical inaccuracies ==
Several references are made to Oklahoma Territory, but no such entity existed until 1890. The territories that existed in the setting of the story at the time were the Indian Territory and the Unorganized Territory.
