= Maureen F. McHugh =

American author (born 1959)

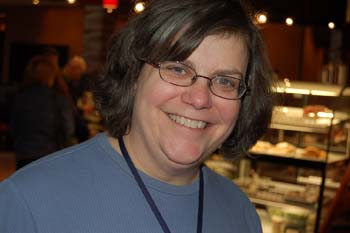
- Maureen McHugh in 2006.
- Born: February 13, 1959 (age 67)
- Education: Ohio University (B.A., 1981); New York University (M.A., 1984)
- Occupations: Author; writer
- Spouse: Bob Yeager (m. 1992)
- Writing career
- Period: 1988–present
- Genres: Science fiction; fantasy
- Notable works: China Mountain Zhang (1992); Mission Child (1998)
- Notable awards: James Tiptree, Jr. Award (1993); Lambda Literary Award (1993); Hugo Award (1996)

Maureen F. McHugh (born February 13, 1959) is an American science fiction and fantasy writer. Her deubt novel, China Mountain Zhang (1992), earned her the James Tiptree, Jr. Award, the Locus Award for Best First Novel, and the Lambda Literary Award for Gay Men's Science Fiction/Fantasy. She has also won a Hugo Award for her story "The Lincoln Train" (1995) and the Shirley Jackson Award for her collection After the Apocalypse (2011). In addition to authoring novels and short stories, McHugh has written for alternate reality games such as I Love Bees (2004) and Year Zero (2007).

== Early life and education ==
McHugh was born February 13, 1959, in Loveland, Ohio. She studied at Ohio University, where she received a Bachelor of Arts in 1981. In 1984, she received a master's degree in English literature from New York University.

== Career ==
McHugh published her first story in Rod Serling's The Twilight Zone Magazine in 1988, under the pseudonym Michael Galloglach. This was followed by a pair of publications under her own name in Isaac Asimov's Science Fiction Magazine in 1989. Since then, she has written four novels and over twenty short stories.

Her first novel, China Mountain Zhang (1992), was nominated for both the Hugo Award and the Nebula Award, and won the James Tiptree, Jr. Award. In 1996, she won a Hugo Award for her short story "The Lincoln Train" (1995). Her short story collection Mothers and Other Monsters was shortlisted as a finalist for the Story Prize in December 2005. In 2013, she was a Readercon guest of honor with Patricia A. McKillip.

McHugh has worked as a writer and/or managing editor for numerous alternate reality game projects, including Year Zero and I Love Bees for 42 Entertainment. Since 2009 she has been a partner at No Mimes Media, an alternate reality game company that she co-founded with Steve Peters and Behnam Karbassi.

== Written works ==
McHugh has published four novels, three poems, and more than fifty short stories, beginning with "All in a Day's Work" in 1988, a short story published under the pen name Michael Galloglach. Her first novel was 1992's China Mountain Zhang.

== Awards and honors ==
Awards and nominations
Year	Award (Note: This table only includes Locus Award nominations where the work placed 10th or better.)	Category	Work	Result
1993	Hugo Award	Novel	China Mountain Zhang	Nominated
1993	Hugo Award	Novella	"Protection"	Nominated
1993	Lambda Literary Award	Gay Men's Science Fiction/Fantasy	China Mountain Zhang	Won
1993	James Tiptree Jr. Award	-	China Mountain Zhang	Won
1993	Locus Award	First Novel	China Mountain Zhang	Won
1993	Nebula Award	Novel	China Mountain Zhang	Nominated
1993	Nebula Award	Novella	"Protection"	Nominated
1995	Locus Award	Novelette	"Nekropolis"	5th
1995	Locus Award	Short Story	"Virtual Love"	5th
1995	Nebula Award	Novelette	"Nekropolis"	Nominated
1995	Nebula Award	Short Story	"Virtual Love"	Nominated
1995	Sidewise Award	Short Form Alternate History	"The Lincoln Train"	Nominated
1995	Theodore Sturgeon Award	-	"Nekropolis"	Finalist
1996	Hugo Award	Short Story	"The Lincoln Train"	Won
1996	Locus Award	Short Story	"The Lincoln Train"	Won
1996	Nebula Award	Short Story	"The Lincoln Train"	Nominated
1997	Hugo Award	Novella	"The Cost to Be Wise"	Nominated
1997	Locus Award	Novella	"The Cost to Be Wise"	10th
1997	Locus Award	Short Story	"Strings"	9th
1997	Nebula Award	Novella	"The Cost to Be Wise"	Nominated
1998	James Tiptree Jr. Award	-	Mission Child	Shortlist
1999	Gaylactic Spectrum Award	Hall of Fame	China Mountain Zhang	Inducted
1999	Nebula Award	Novel	Mission Child	Nominated
2002	John W. Campbell Memorial Award	-	Nekropolis	Finalist
2002	Locus Award	Science Fiction Novel	Nekropolis	7th
2002	Theodore Sturgeon Award	-	"Interview: On Any Given Day"	Shortlist
2003	Hugo Award	Novelette	"Presence"	Nominated
2004	World Fantasy Award	Short Fiction	"Ancestor Money"	Nominated
2009	James Tiptree Jr. Award	-	"Useless Things"	Honor List
2009	Theodore Sturgeon Award	-	"Special Economics"	Shortlist
2010	Locus Award	Short Story	"Special Economics"	3rd
2011	James Tiptree Jr. Award	-	"After the Apocalypse"	Honor List
2011	Locus Award	Novelette	"The Naturalist"	7th
2012	Locus Award	Collection	After the Apocalypse: Stories	2nd
2012	Philip K. Dick Award	-	After the Apocalypse: Stories	Finalist
2012	Shirley Jackson Award	Collection	After the Apocalypse: Stories	Won
2012	World Fantasy Award	Collection	After the Apocalypse: Stories	Nominated
2014	Shirley Jackson Award	Short Fiction	"The Memory Book"	Nominated
2018	Theodore Sturgeon Award	-	"Sidewalks"	Finalist
2021	Theodore Sturgeon Award	-	"Yellow and the Perception of Reality"	Finalist
2023	Locus Award	Short Story	"The Goldfish Man"	8th
