= Twilight Zone literature =

Media adaptations of The Twilight Zone series

Twilight Zone literature is an umbrella term for the many books and comic books which concern or adapt The Twilight Zone television series.

== Comics ==
Dell Comics published two "Twilight Zone" comics as issues #1173 (March–May 1961) and #1288 (February–April 1962) of the Four Color comics anthology. They then published two standalone issues, #01860-207 (May–July 1962) and #01-860-210 (August–October 1962).

Gold Key Comics published a long-running Twilight Zone comic that featured the likeness of Rod Serling introducing both original stories and occasional adaptations of episodes. The comic book series ran for 91 issues from November 1962 to April 1979. Issue #92 was published in May 1982 and reprinted the first issue. George Wilson drew several covers for the series. The Gold Key series continued for years after the television series's last original episode in June 1964 and Serling's death on June 28, 1975.

A later revival of Twilight Zone comics was published by Now Comics, spinning off of the 1980s revival of the show.

In 2008, The Savannah College of Art & Design and publisher Walker & Company collaborated to produce a series of graphic novel adaptations of episodes from the series that were written by Rod Serling.

Beginning in December 2013, comics publisher Dynamite Entertainment ran a multi-issue series, written by J. Michael Straczynski and with art by Guiu Vilanova.

The publisher IDW is launching a new Twilight Zone comic in September 2025.

== Guides ==
Marc Scott Zicree's episode-by-episode guide of the original series, The Twilight Zone Companion (1982), was published by Bantam Books. Later editions were updated to include a brief chapter acknowledging the 1985 revival series, although no additions or corrections were made to the previously existing text.

Martin Grams Jr.'s volume, The Twilight Zone: Unlocking the Door to a Television Classic (2008), covers production information for each episode of the original series in great detail. At 800 pages, it is much longer and more detailed than Zicree's guide, and makes a point of identifying and correcting Zicree's misstatements and errors.

== Magazines ==
The Twilight Zone Magazine
- First issue of The Twilight Zone Magazine, April 1981
- Editor: T. E. D. Klein, Michael Blaine, Tappan King
- Categories: horror fiction
- Frequency: Monthly
- First issue: April 1981
- Final issue: June 1989
- Country: United States
- ISSN: 0279-6090

Beginning in 1981 and with T. E. D. Klein as editor, The Twilight Zone Magazine (also known as Rod Serling's The Twilight Zone Magazine) featured horror fiction and to some extent other forms of fantasy and some borderline science fiction. The TZ Magazine reviewed and previewed new movies while publishing articles about The Twilight Zone original and revival (The Twilight Zone) television series, among other cultural oddities. The Twilight Zone Magazine was initially successful; by 1983 it was selling 125,000 issues a month, outselling magazines like Analog. Under Klein's editorship, the magazine published several noted writers, including Harlan Ellison, Stephen King, Pamela Sargent, and Peter Straub. In late 1985, Michael Blaine succeeded Klein as editor. From March 1986 until its last issue of June 1989 the editor was Tappan King, who also edited its "twisted sister" publication, Night Cry. It was the most reliable market for much of the best short horror in that period and appealed to audiences for the likes of Fangoria and Starlog, as well as for The Magazine of Fantasy and Science Fiction and Whispers. Like Omni Magazine, which it also somewhat resembled, it was published by a company better-known for "skin" magazines, Gallery's Montcalm Publishing.

The all-fiction digest-sized companion, Night Cry, makes a cameo in The Simpsons 300th episode, "Barting Over". On occasion, the magazine and digest reprinted often-anthologized short stories, introducing a new generation of horror aficionados to classic short stories by veteran writers, such as "The Voice in the Night" by William Hope Hodgson, and "The Bookshop" by Nelson Bond.

== Novels ==
Numerous novelizations were published based upon episodes of The Twilight Zone. In 2003, the first Twilight Zone novel was published, entitled The Twilight Zone Book 1: Harvest Moon, which was written by John J. Miller. Two sequels were later published. The first sequel was entitled The Twilight Zone Book 2: A Gathering of Shadows which was written by Russell Davis. The second sequel was entitled The Twilight Zone Book 3: Deep in the Dark written by John Helfers.

In 2004, Black Flame released the five novelizations based on 2 episodes each from the 2002 series. Five authors, Jay Russell, Pat Cadigan, Paul Woods, K. C. Winters and Christa Faust, adapted the episodes.

== Short story collections ==
Several volumes of original short stories were published under The Twilight Zone brand, the first of which was edited by Rod Serling, himself.

- From the Twilight Zone (1962, Doubleday)
- Chilling Stories from Rod Serling's The Twilight Zone (1965, Grosset & Dunlap)
- Rod Serling's Twilight Zone Revisited (1967)
- Twilight Zone: 19 Original Stories on the 50th Anniversary (2009, Tor Books)

== See also ==
- Fantasy fiction magazine
- Horror fiction magazine
- Online magazine
- Science fiction magazine
