= Barbara Delaplace =

Canadian science fiction writer (1952–2022)

Delaplace (undated)

Barbara Delaplace (August 2, 1952 - July 7, 2022) was a Canadian science fiction writer.

== Early life and education ==
Barbara Mona Delaplace was born in Vancouver, British Columbia on August 2, 1952.

In 1976, she graduated from the University of British Columbia with a BSc. degree.

== Career ==
For twelve years (1982–1994), she worked as a research technologist in Vancouver at Terry Fox Laboratory, serving as the Media Preparation Department's division head.

At the University of Florida, beginning in 1994, she was employed as an Academic Assistant II.

Delaplace won the HOMer Award for best short story of 1992 for her "Black Ice", originally published in the theme anthology Aladdin: Master of the Lamp.

In May 2002, she was a headline speaker at the Orlando Area Science Fiction Society's 15th annual convention.

== Personal life ==
From 1976 until 1980, she was married to Michael Delaplace.

Living in Gainesville, Florida, she secondly married Jack C. Haldeman II (d. 2002) in 1995.

Barbara Delaplace died on July 7, 2022, at the age of 69.

== Awards and honours ==
- 1991, finalist, John W. Campbell Award for Best New Writer 1992
- 1992, nominee, Hugo Awards
- 1992, winner, HOMer Award
- 1994, finalist, HOMer Award

== Selected works ==
=== Short stories ===
Delaplace was primarily an author of short stories, with at least 25 published. Several were translated into other languages.

- "Legends Never Die", the Fantastic Adventures of Robin Hood, Martin Greenberg, ed., Signet (June 1991)
- "Wings", Horsefantastic, Martin Greenberg, ed., DAW (December 1991)
- "Choices", Alternate Presidents, Mike Resnick, ed., Tor (January 1992)
- "The Hidden Dragon", Dragonfantastic, Martin Greenberg, ed., DAW (May 1992)

- Translation: "Der verborgene Drache" (in German, 1995)

- "Freedom" (collected in Mike Resnick's alternate history anthology Alternate Kennedys) (July 1992)
- "Trading Up", with Mike Resnick, in Battlestation, Book One, David Drake and Bill Fawcett, ed., Ace (July 1992)
- "Belonging", The Crafters, Vol. 2: Blressings and Curses, Bill Fawcett and Christopher Stasheff, ed., Ace (August 1992)
- "Lost Lamb", Whatdunits, Mike Resnick, ed., DAW (October 1992)
- "The Last Sphinx", in A Christmas Bestiary, Rosalind M. and Martin Greenberg, ed., DAW (November 1992)
- "Black Ice" in Aladdin: Master of the Mystic Lamp, Mike Resnick and Martin Greenberg, ed., DAW (December 1992)
- "No Other Choice} (1992)
- "Standing Firm" (1993) (collected in Mike Resnick's alternate history anthology Alternate Warriors)
- "Modern Mansions (1993)
- "Fellow Passengers" (1993)

- Translation: "Reisegefährten" (German, 1993)
- Translation: "Compagni di viaggio" (Italian, 1993)

- "Painted Bridges" (1994) (collected in Mike Resnick's alternate history anthology Alternate Outlaws)
- "The Garden" (1994)
- "Farewell, My Buddy" (1994)
- "Connections" (1994)
- "Painted Bridges" (1994)
- "1945 ApeCon" (1996)
- "That'll Be the Day", with Jack C. Haldeman, II (1996)
- "The Found and Lost Shop (1996)
- "Black Ops (1997)
- "Home Key (1997)
- "In the Cards (1997)
- "Rx (1997)
- "Resident Alien (2005)
