= List of fictional United States presidencies of historical figures (M–O) =

Lists of fictional presidents of the United States
A–B	C–D	E–F
G–H	I–J	K–M
N–R	S–T	U–Z
Fictional presidencies of historical figures
A–B	C–D	E–G
H–J	K–L	M–O
P–R	S–U	V–Z

The following is a list of real or historical people who have been portrayed as President of the United States in fiction, although they did not hold the office in real life. This is done either as an alternate history scenario, or occasionally for humorous purposes. Also included are actual US presidents with a fictional presidency at a different time and/or under different circumstances than the one in actual history.

== M ==
=== Douglas MacArthur ===
- President in: Resistance: A Hole in the Sky
- 35th President of the United States.
- Commander of the United States Armed Forces during the Chimeran War.
- Became Acting President of the United States following the death of President Harvey McCullen during the Chimera's invasion of the U.S. in 1953.
- Killed in action against the Chimera in Phoenix, Arizona, in 1953.
- Succeeded by Assistant Secretary of the Interior Thomas Voss.

=== James Madison ===
- In a parallel universe featured in the short story "He Walked Around the Horses" by H. Beam Piper, James Madison was a major participant in the short-lived rebellion in the colonies of the British North America in the 1770s. In 1809, he was living in exile in Switzerland. A seemingly insane individual who claimed to be a British diplomat named Benjamin Bathurst maintained that the American rebels were successful in their attempts to achieve independence, Madison was the current President of the United States in 1809 and was preceded by Thomas Jefferson, the author of the American rebels' Declaration of Philadelphia.
- In the short story "The War of '07" by Jayge Carr in the anthology Alternate Presidents edited by Mike Resnick, James Madison served as Attorney General in the cabinet of Aaron Burr, who became the 3rd president after defeating Thomas Jefferson in the 1800 election.
- In Harry Turtledove's alternative history series Southern Victory, James Madison served as the 4th president from March 4, 1809, to March 4, 1817, as he did in real life. Due to his Virginia heritage as well as his anti-Federalist views, Madison was generally remembered unfavorably in the version of history taught in the United States after the Confederate States of America achieved its independence in the War of Secession (1861–1862) with the support of the United Kingdom and France. Many in the United States presumed that Cassius Madison, the 16-year-old Confederate black boy who had killed Confederate States President Jake Featherston on July 7, 1944, had taken his surname in honor of President Madison. In fact, Cassius had taken it from the Georgia town nearest to where he had gunned down Featherston. He had never even heard of Madison before he began his tour of the United States after the end of the Second Great War (1941–1944).
- In the 1988 short story The Reploids by Stephen King, Edward Paladin, who is revealed to be the counterpart of Johnny Carson as host of The Tonight Show in a parallel universe, has a deep-blue United States one-dollar bill in his wallet with James Madison on it, implying that he served as the first president of the United States instead of George Washington in Paladin's universe.

=== Alfred Thayer Mahan ===
- In the alternative history novels The Great War: Walk in Hell and American Empire: Blood and Iron, part of the Southern Victory Series by Harry Turtledove, Alfred Thayer Mahan is mentioned as having served as president from 1889 to 1897. Mahan's place in the pantheon of "great US presidents" was assured when he forced the Confederate States of America to abandon its proposal to build a canal in Nicaragua. President Mahan was credited with the observation that the main problem with republics is that "over time, the voters are apt to get tired of paying for what their country needs to defend itself." He was succeeded by Thomas Brackett Reed, who served as president from 1897 until he died in office in 1902.

=== George Marshall ===
- President in "Thor Meets Captain America", 1987 novelette by David Brin
- Mentioned as being president in 1962, three years after his death in real life.

=== Thomas R. Marshall ===
- In the 1953 alternate history novel Bring the Jubilee by Ward Moore, Thomas Marshall is elected president in 1916 as candidate for the Populist Party. He is then defeated for reelection in 1920 by William Hale Thompson.

=== John McCain ===
- In the future history graphic novel Shooting War by Anthony Lappé, McCain was president in 2011.
- In the Treehouse of Horror XIX episode of The Simpsons, Homer attempts to vote for Barack Obama in the 2008 presidential election but his electronic voting machine registers his multiple attempts to do so as six votes for McCain; upon realizing that the machine is rigged, Homer attempts to head out to report the mishap, but the machine sucks him in and kills him to hide the truth.

=== Eugene McCarthy ===
- President in Robert L. O'Connel's "The Cuban Missile Crisis: Second Holocaust", an essay in the 2003 book What Ifs? of American History, edited by Robert Cowley. He was elected as the 38th president in 1968, in the long aftermath of the Cuban Missile Crisis in October 1962 which escalated into nuclear war. The US reacted drastically to the destruction of Washington, D.C., by totally destroying the Soviet Union and Cuba and killing some 90% of their populations. It was subsequently accused of having perpetrated genocide. Richard Nixon, who as elected as the 37th president in 1964, had driven the US into complete international isolation and made it a pariah nation. McCarthy soundly defeated the incumbent Nixon in 1968, promising "global reconciliation and healing" and winning no less than 76% of the popular vote. McCarthy's success as president was only partial. He did reduce the American nuclear arsenal but refused to completely dispose of it, which the rest of the world found inadequate. He did manage to re-establish diplomatic relations with 21 countries and got the US an observer status in the United Nations, stating that it would become a full member again only should the UN drop the demand for the US to pay war reparations. McCarthy did provide generous US help in trying to rehabilitate the starving and radiation-ridden remnants of the populations of "The Victim Nations" (the Soviet Union, Cuba, and former Warsaw Pact countries). However, shortly before the 1972 election, a commission headed by Newt Gingrich (in his role as Archivist of the United States) presented to President McCarthy its recommendations – with the conclusion that the US would only be fully readmitted to the Family of Nations by adhering to the "Geneva Convention of the Total Abolition of Nuclear Weapons", already accepted by all other countries in the world.

=== Joseph McCarthy ===
- In the alternate history short story "We Could Do Worse" by Gregory Benford, Joseph McCarthy was chosen in 1952 as the Republican vice presidential candidate by nominee Robert A. Taft, a choice made with the tacit support of California Senator Richard Nixon. When Taft died on July 31, 1953 (as in real life), McCarthy became the 35th president. By the 1956 election, when the story took place, he was well on his way to establishing a brutal dictatorship. The story indicates McCarthy would be re-elected with Nixon as his running mate, using considerable voter intimidation provided by federal agents, and would "diddle" the United States Constitution to make his power permanent by 1960. At some point during his first term, President McCarthy had placed Adlai Stevenson, Taft's Democratic opponent in 1952, under house arrest due to his alleged Communist sympathies. The story depicted two federal agents arresting a congressman named Garrett, a member of the United States House of Representatives' Internal Security Committee who has proven to be a major thorn in McCarthy's side, on the trumped up charge that he was part of a Communist spy network. Shortly thereafter, Garrett was murdered. The arrest took place on August 20, 1956, while the first day of the Republican National Convention was being broadcast live on CBS. After being renominated by his party, President McCarthy was interviewed by Walter Cronkite. The two federal agents in question were grateful that Nixon delivered the California delegation to Taft at the 1952 Convention as it prevented Dwight D. Eisenhower, a "pinko general" with a "Kraut name," from securing the nomination. Furthermore, they regarded Taft's death as a godsend as it allowed McCarthy to accede to the presidency. In reality, McCarthy died of acute hepatitis on May 2, 1957. If the same is true of the version of McCarthy depicted in the story, it is possible that Nixon will succeed him as the 36th president only seven months after the 1956 election.

=== George B. McClellan ===
- George McClellan is President in Gray Victory by Robert Skimin. He was elected as the 17th president in 1864 after General Sherman failed to take Atlanta, leading to Northern voters feeling fatigue with the never-ending American Civil War. Upon learning the result of the election, Abraham Lincoln orders an immediate cease-fire, which McClellan follows with peace negotiations and recognition of the Confederate States of America which accounted themselves as victors of the war. McClellan was sharply criticized by abolitionists for having perpetuated slavery, and two years after his election a growing number of Americans are having second thoughts about having ended the war.

=== John William McCormack ===
- He was the 36th President of the United States in "The Cuban Missile Crisis: Second Holocaust" (an essay in What Ifs? of American History) by Robert L. O'Connell. As Speaker of the United States House of Representatives, McCormack succeeded John F. Kennedy following a nuclear strike on Washington, D.C., on Saturday, October 27, 1962, as the Cuban Missile Crisis escalated into the Two Days' War. A Russian SS-4 (R-12 Dvina) IRBM (launched from Cuba) detonated above the Lincoln Memorial, leveling much of the surrounding area, including The White House, taking with it Kennedy, Vice President Lyndon B. Johnson, and the rest of the National Command Authority. At nearly 71 upon assuming office, McCormack became the oldest serving president. Falling into ill health following his admirable handling of the crises that followed the war, he did not contest the 1964 presidential election, and was succeeded by the Republican victor Richard Nixon, who became the 37th president.
- In the alternative history novel Surrounded by Enemies: What if Kennedy Survived Dallas? by Bryce Zabel, McCormack acceded to the presidency on February 24, 1966, after the impeachment, trial and removal from office of President John F. Kennedy for multiple incidents of extramarital affairs both before and during his term in office. As Vice President Lyndon B. Johnson had been forced to resign due to allegations of bribery and financial malfeasance, McCormack's position as Speaker of the House of Representatives meant that he was the first in the line of succession to the presidency under the provisions of the Presidential Succession Act 1947. For a time, it appeared that his Republican predecessor Gerald Ford would become president, but the Democrats gained a slim majority of 218-217 in the House of Representatives and McCormack once again became the Speaker. At 75 years old, he was the oldest man to take office as president. In March 1966, McCormack gave Kennedy a pardon for any crimes which he committed or may have committed while in office. He also announced that he would not run for election in 1968. He was succeeded by Richard Nixon.

=== George McGovern ===
- In one of the episodes What If?, program of Discovery Channel, George McGovern was appointed vice president after Martin Luther King Jr. took office as the 38th president following the assassination of his predecessor Robert F. Kennedy in September 1969. After King was likewise assassinated in September 1971, McGovern became the 39th president.
- He was also the subject of the novel President McGovern's First Term (1973) by Nicholas Max.
- In the anthology Alternate Presidents edited by Mike Resnick, two stories deal with McGovern winning the 1972 election and becoming the 38th president. In both stories, his vice president was Sargent Shriver, the brother-in-law of John F. Kennedy. In "Suppose They Gave a Peace..." by Susan Shwartz, McGovern wins when the youth vote turns out for him in droves, and is then blamed for the debacle that occurs when he swiftly withdraws US troops from South Vietnam. In "Paper Trail" by Brian Thomsen, the tide turns for McGovern after reporter Carl Bernstein, investigating a break-in at the Watergate complex, is killed in a hit-and-run accident which is very quickly linked to G. Gordon Liddy.
- George McGovern was also elected in 1972 in one of the alternative timelines featured in Paul Di Filippo's Fuzzy Dice. In this case, he was narrowly elected after President Richard Nixon had undergone an assassination attempt and become completely paranoid, waging a crackdown on real and imagined domestic foes as well as a huge escalation of the Vietnam War, and setting off a huge explosion of countrywide riots. Unfortunately, the riots continue and even increase after McGovern's election and a call by the new president for a return to calm proves completely ineffective. McGovern rejects a call in Congress to use the Army to quell the riots, leading to an attempted impeachment. Some military commanders try repression on their own, killing civilians and only adding to the ferocity of the riots. Eventually, the country is plunged into chaos, all-out civil war, and eventually the total collapse of the Old Order. When the book's protagonist arrives some decades later, he finds a "Hippie-style" dictatorship presided over by the monstrous Lady Sunshine and with Hells Angels acting as the police, and the final fate of McGovern is unknown.
- Although not actually specified, in The Fairly OddParents episode The Secret Origin of Denzel Crocker, Timmy, Cosmo and Wanda travel back to March 15, 1972, and accidentally cause Denzel Crocker to lose his Fairy Godparents, who happen to be that time's counterparts to Cosmo and Wanda. As punishment, Jorgen Von Strangle forbids them from ever going to March 1972 again but tells them that they'll still be allowed to visit other months of that year on the proviso they won't ruin the election of "President McGovern". This suggests that Timmy was somehow responsible for McGovern's defeat or that Jorgen didn't know that George McGovern would lose the presidential election to Nixon.
- In the short story, "Hillary Orbits Venus" by Pamela Sargent, McGovern was elected in 1968 and 1972. During his term, he withdrew US troops from Vietnam and expanded funding to NASA.

=== William McKinley ===
- In Ward Moore's novel Bring the Jubilee, one of the time travelling characters in the alternative reality witnessed the victory of the Democratic candidate William Jennings Bryan in the 1896 presidential election where he had to resist the temptation of covering the confident bets made by McKinley's supporters, who were unaware that Bryan would go on to serve three terms as president. President Bryan was the candidate for both the Democratic Party and the Populist Party.
- In the short story "Plowshare" by Martha Soukup in the anthology Alternate Presidents edited by Mike Resnick, William Jennings Bryan was elected as the 25th president in 1896 over William McKinley. President Bryan ended the Spanish–American War by granting full independence to Cuba, the Philippines, Puerto Rico and Hawaii. Only 36 years old at the time of his election, he was the youngest man ever elected to the presidency. President Bryan served one term from 1897 to 1901, declining to run for re-election in 1900 as he believed that presidents should only serve one term. In spite of this, in 1915, he revealed to the American public that he intended to prevent the expected Republican presidential nominee Theodore Roosevelt's plan to take the US into the Great War from coming to fruition by running against him and defeating him in the 1916 election. During his presidency, Bryan was a vocal supporter of women's suffrage, which was granted throughout the United States in 1913.
- In the alternative history novel 1901 by Robert Conroy, William McKinley died of a sudden heart attack in 1901 after being overwhelmed by the invasion of Long Island by Germany. He was succeeded by Theodore Roosevelt, who became the 26th president and went on to win the war against Germany.
- On the online timeline of the 2004 mockumentary CSA: The Confederate States of America, William McKinley served as the President of the Confederate States of America from the late 1800s until 1901. According to the timeline, he was president during the alternate version of the Spanish–American War, which sparked a resurgence in the Manifest Destiny and the Confederacy's continued expansion south that would continue well into the 1920s and would include all of the Caribbean, Mexico, Central and South America as part of the nation's conquered territories. In 1901, McKinley was assassinated at the Pan-American Exposition (as in reality). However, instead of being shot by Leon Czolgosz, an anarchist, he was instead killed by an abolitionist. (This contradicts the mockumentary, as John F. Kennedy was mentioned as the first Northern Confederate president to be elected).

=== Robert McNamara ===
- Robert McNamara served as the president in Thomas M. Disch's 1968 science fiction novel Camp Concentration.

=== James B. McPherson ===
- In If the South Had Won the Civil War by MacKinlay Kantor, James McPherson survived and became President of United States for two terms in the 1880s. During his Second Inaugural Speech he strongly called for reconciliation with the Confederate States, arguing that the war ending in 1863 saved the lives of many who would have been killed had it dragged on. This was warmly received south of the Mason–Dixon line, became part of the school curriculum and helped achieve an eventual reunification (though it only came long after his death). (In actual history, James McPherson was a Union officer who was killed in 1864; this did not happen in Kantor's alternative timeline, where the war ended in 1863 with a decisive Confederate victory.)

=== Andrew Mellon ===
- In the alternative history/time travel story "A Slip in Time" by S. M. Stirling, 'Andrew Mellon was briefly mentioned as being President in 1926 in an alternate timeline in which the First World War was avoided and the Austro-Hungarian Empire survived. In general, the alternative 1926 featured in the story has a worldwide trend favoring conservative politicians and regimes, including Mellon.

=== H. L. Mencken ===
- In the alternative history novel The Probability Broach as part of the North American Confederacy Series by L. Neil Smith in which the United States became a libertarian state after a successful Whiskey Rebellion and the overthrowing and execution of George Washington by firing squad for treason in 1794, H. L. Mencken served as the 19th president of the North American Confederacy from 1928 until his death in 1933. He killed his vice president in a duel and was subsequently killed himself by his vice president's mother. After his death, the Continental Congress choose Frank Chodorov as his successor.

=== Walter Mondale ===
- In the short story "Huddled Masses" by Lawrence Person contained in the anthology Alternate Presidents edited by Mike Resnick, Mondale defeated Ronald Reagan in the 1984 Presidential Election to become the 41st president. His vice president was Geraldine Ferraro, who was the first woman to hold the office. As a result, the Sandinista National Liberation Front movement expanded, causing a civil war in Mexico. This was followed by an invasion from the United States and a massive influx of Latin American refugees into the American Southwest.
- In the American Dad! episode "The Best Christmas Story Never Told", when Stan Smith is taken back in time to 1970 by the Ghost of Christmas Past, he uses the opportunity to try and kill Jane Fonda, whom he believes ruined Christmas through political correctness. After persuading Martin Scorsese to give up drugs, Taxi Driver is never made, preventing John Hinckley Jr.'s attempt on Ronald Reagan's life which resulted in Walter Mondale winning the 1984 election, after which he surrendered the United States to the Soviet Union after his seventy-fourth day in office. After unsuccessfully attempting to recreate Taxi Driver (replacing Robert De Niro in the lead with John Wayne) in the hope of once again getting Hinckley obsessed with Jodie Foster, Stan largely restores the original timeline by shooting at Reagan himself.

=== James Monroe ===
- In the alternative history novel The Probability Broach as part of the North American Confederacy Series by L. Neil Smith in which the United States became a libertarian state after a successful Whiskey Rebellion and George Washington being overthrown and executed by firing squad for treason in 1794, James Monroe helps Albert Gallatin arrange the Louisiana Purchase in 1803, borrowing money from private sources against the value of the land; as the central government is no longer allowed to produce money, the purchase is mostly made in gold and silver. On July 4, 1826, he would become the fifth president following the death of Thomas Jefferson and would serve until his own death exactly five years later on July 4, 1831.
- In Harry Turtledove's Southern Victory alternative history series, James Monroe served as the fifth president from March 4, 1817, to March 4, 1825, as he did in real life. He was from Virginia, a trait which consigned his predecessors Thomas Jefferson, James Madison and even George Washington to being remembered in a mixed or negative light by US historians following the War of Secession (1861–1862) in which the Confederate States of America achieved its independence with the support of the United Kingdom and France. In spite of this, Monroe was looked upon kindly in US history books for his attempt to promote American security and international prestige with the Monroe Doctrine. This doctrine was eviscerated in 1862 when, given the victory of the Confederacy, the US was powerless to prevent France from installing Maximilian I as the Emperor of Mexico.

=== Marilyn Monroe ===
- In the short story "A Dream Can Make A Difference" by Beth Meacham, contained in the anthology By Any Other Fame, Marilyn Monroe survived her drug overdose on August 5, 1962 and subsequently entered politics. She was elected as the Governor of California in 1970, defeating the Republican incumbent and her fellow former Hollywood star Ronald Reagan. She went on to be elected as the first female President of the United States in 1980 with Jimmy Carter as her running mate. After only 69 days in office, President Monroe was assassinated in Washington, D.C. on March 30, 1981 by John Hinckley Jr. as the culmination of an effort to impress Jodie Foster. She was succeeded by Carter. After William Henry Harrison, who died on his 32nd day in office on April 4, 1841, she was the second shortest-serving president in US history.

=== Charlie Murphy ===
- President in: Chappelle's Show, episode #110
- Vice President under Dave Chappelle; becomes president when President Chapelle goes missing during his third term.

== N ==
=== Ralph Nader ===
- President in the Saturday Night Live skit A Glimpse of Our Possible Future III (2000), played by Jimmy Fallon.

=== Richard Nixon ===
- In the alternative history novel If Israel Lost the War by Robert Littell, Richard Z. Chesnoff and Edward Klein, Israel was defeated by Egypt, Syria, Jordan and Iraq in the Six-Day War (June 5-June 10, 1967). As Sirhan Sirhan returned home to Jordan to celebrate the conquest of Israel, Robert F. Kennedy was never assassinated and went on to defeat Richard Nixon in the 1968 election, becoming the 37th president.
- In Poul Anderson's The Psychotechnic League, Vice President Richard Nixon succeeded as the 35th president in June 1956, following the death of President Dwight D. Eisenhower from surgical complications. Becoming president as a relatively young man of 43, only a few years removed from his active participation in the House Un-American Activities Committee and with his anti-Communist zeal untampered by the pragmatism he might have gained in later life, Nixon embarked on a wild, provocative and confrontational policy. This resulted by 1958 in a worldwide nuclear war, in which President Nixon himself was killed along with hundreds of millions of other people.
- In the alternative history novel The Probability Broach by L. Neil Smith in which the United States became a libertarian state known as the North American Confederacy, Richard Nixon was a small-time criminal in California in 1986.
- In Making History by Stephen Fry, the protagonist Michael Young and physicist Leo Zuckerman (born Axel Bauer, the son of an SS doctor) accidentally created an alternate reality wherein the Axis Powers won the Second World War by preventing Hitler's conception in the hope of averting the Second World War and the Holocaust. In this reality, where Hitler was replaced with the more effective and patient Rudolph Gloder, a more socially conservative United States (where racial segregation and illegality of homosexuality are still realities) is locked in a Cold War with the Third Reich. Richard Nixon is mentioned as having been a three-term President, elected in 1960, 1964 and 1968.
- In the time travel short story "Hindsight" by Harry Turtledove, Nixon's presidency was fictionalized two decades before the Watergate scandal (1972–1974) in the 1953 novel Watergate by Michelle Gordian, a time traveler from the early 1980s who wrote science fiction stories under the pseudonym "Mark Gordian." The novel was critically acclaimed and was compared to Nineteen Eighty-Four by George Orwell. Senator Joseph McCarthy publicly criticized Watergate which Pete Lundquist, a science fiction writer from California, believed spoke well of it. As Nixon was serving as vice president under Dwight D. Eisenhower in 1953, Gordian referred to him as "President Cavanaugh" in the novel.
- In Watchmen, Richard Nixon was the incumbent president in 1985, having repealed the Twenty-second Amendment after winning the Vietnam War and making Vietnam the 51st state of the Union by utilizing Doctor Manhattan. In the comic series, it was suggested that masked-vigilante-turned-paramilitary agent The Comedian had killed Bob Woodward and Carl Bernstein, thereby keeping the actions of Committee for the Re-Election of the President in 1972 secret. He is challenged for re-election by Robert Redford in 1988. In the Watchmen television series, Nixon was succeeded by Redford in 1992, who was serving his seventh consecutive term in 2019. By 2019, Nixon became the fifth president to have his likeness carved into Mount Rushmore and the namesake of Hooverville-like settlements called 'Nixonvilles', one of which is located in Tulsa, Oklahoma.
- In the alternative history Dark Future novel series by Kim Newman, Richard Nixon defeated John F. Kennedy in the 1960 election after it was discovered that Kennedy was having an affair with Marilyn Monroe. Under Nixon's leadership, the Solid Sixties were seen as a golden age of peace, stability and decent moral values in the United States. Legal restrictions were removed from businesses, allowing for both technological advancement and ending regulations against pollution. Racial strife was considered to be ended by the separate but equal laws. He was succeeded by Barry Goldwater.
- In the alternative history short story "We Could Do Worse" by Gregory Benford, Senator Robert A. Taft secured the Republican presidential nomination at the 1952 Republican National Convention, narrowly beating General Dwight D. Eisenhower, with the support of the California delegation which was delivered by Richard Nixon. In the election the following November, Taft defeated Adlai Stevenson and was inaugurated as the 34th president on January 20, 1953. However, after only six months in office, President Taft died of a heart attack on July 31, 1953, as occurred in reality. He was succeeded by his vice president Joseph McCarthy. By the 1956 election, when the story takes place, President McCarthy was well on his way to establishing a brutal dictatorship. The story indicates McCarthy would be re-elected with Nixon as his running mate, using considerable voter intimidation provided by federal agents, and would "diddle" the United States Constitution to make his power permanent by 1960. Two federal agents, the principal characters of the story, were grateful for Nixon's part in facilitating the late President Taft's nomination as it prevented Eisenhower, a "pinko general" with a "Kraut name", from being elected president. In reality, McCarthy died of acute hepatitis on May 2, 1957. If the same is true of the version of McCarthy depicted in the story, it is possible that Nixon will succeed him as the 36th president less than seven months after the 1956 election.
- In Back to the Future Part II, Biff Tannen travels back to November 12, 1955, to give his younger self a sports almanac filled with the results of sporting events for the rest of the twentieth-century, and become wealthy by betting on the known outcomes. In the resultant alternate timeline, the May 23, 1983, edition of the Hill Valley Telegraph carries the story that Richard Nixon intends to run for a fifth term in 1984, having seemingly been re-elected in 1976 and 1980 with Biff's support. He pledges to successfully conclude the Vietnam War by 1985, a reference to the events of Watchmen. Once the proper timeline is restored, the story is replaced by one which states that Ronald Reagan intends to run for a second term in 1984.
- In the short story "The Impeachment of Adlai Stevenson" by David Gerrold contained in the anthology Alternate Presidents edited by Mike Resnick, the title character defeated Dwight D. Eisenhower in 1952 after Eisenhower made the mistake of choosing Joseph McCarthy as his running mate instead of Richard Nixon. However, Stevenson proved to be an extremely unpopular president, leading to his impeachment and subsequent resignation in August 1958. Stevenson is succeeded by his untested 41-year-old vice-president John F. Kennedy. Although the story ends immediately after Stevenson has decided to resign, it is heavily implied that Nixon, already the front runner for the next Republican nomination, will defeat Kennedy in the 1960 election and become the 36th president. This is due both to the public's antipathy towards the Democrats and the fact that Kennedy is a much derided figure due to his recent marriage to the Hollywood actress Marilyn Monroe, referred to derisively as "the new Monroe Doctrine."
- In the short story "Heavy Metal" by Barry N. Malzberg, also contained in the anthology Alternate Presidents edited by Mike Resnick, Richard Nixon was elected as the 35th president in 1960 following a feud between John F. Kennedy and Richard J. Daley. He won Illinois and, consequently, the election by 240,000 votes. He succeeded Dwight D. Eisenhower, under whom he had served as vice president from 1953 to 1961. His own vice president was Henry Cabot Lodge Jr.
- In the short story "Fellow Americans" by Eileen Gunn, also contained in the anthology Alternate Presidents by Mike Resnick, Barry Goldwater defeated the early favorite and incumbent Lyndon B. Johnson in 1964 and went on to be re-elected in 1968. During his term in office, President Goldwater ordered that nuclear weapons be deployed against North Vietnam during the Vietnam War. Following his "last press conference" on November 7, 1962, immediately after his defeat in the 1962 California gubernatorial election to the Democratic incumbent Pat Brown, Richard Nixon retired from politics. As President Goldwater had never liked nor trusted Dwight D. Eisenhower's former vice president, he was pleased that Nixon had never acceded to the nation's highest office. However, Nixon re-entered the public sphere in an entirely different context eight years later. Despite an uneasy relationship with the media dating back to the Checkers speech during the 1952 presidential election campaign, he parlayed his electoral defeat into television success and was given a late-night talk show entitled Tricky Dick (referring to his most famous political nickname) on NBC in 1970. Much to Goldwater's annoyance, the series garnered high ratings from its inception and, by 1990, was still as popular as ever despite being on its twentieth season. He believed that it was time for the 77-year-old Nixon to retire from television as well as politics. At the beginning of every episode, Nixon made the V sign, which became his trademark. Much of Nixon's continued popularity was attributed to his use of self-deprecating humor as he frequently made jokes about his defeat by John F. Kennedy in the 1960 election and the perceived ineffectual nature of the office of vice president. In a 1990 edition of Tricky Dick in which he was supposedly connected to a lie detector, he admitted that he and his wife Pat Nixon had tried LSD in 1965 (before it was made illegal) which they had obtained from a Hollywood couple. After taking the LSD, Nixon imagined himself to be a submarine whereas his wife cried at the thought of all of the music trapped inside their piano. Long resident in Hollywood, the Nixon's owned a luxurious yacht and frequently entertained various actors and politicians on the boat. For instance, they maintained a friendship with Vice President Dan Quayle and his wife Marilyn Quayle. While the two couples relaxed in the yacht's hot tub, Nixon learned that it was Quayle's ambition to one day send a human mission to Mars, though President George H. W. Bush was considerably more skeptical about its viability.
- In the short story President-Elect by Mark Aronson contained in the anthology Alternate Kennedys edited by Mike Resnick, Robert F. Kennedy survives his assassination attempt by Sirhan Sirhan. As a result, he adopts a hard anti-crime stance and becomes a member of the Republican Party. He wins the Republican nomination and selects former Vice President Richard Nixon as his running mate. Meanwhile, Robert's brother Ted wins the Democratic nomination, resulting in the 1968 election becoming a Kennedy vs Kennedy match-up. On election day, Robert defeats his brother. However, President-elect Robert dies in a car accident in Chappaquiddick Island, resulting in Vice President-elect Nixon becoming the 37th president of the United States, instead.
- In the alternative history novel The Two Georges by Harry Turtledove and Richard Dreyfuss, Richard "Honest Dick" Nixon was a prosperous used-steamer salesman in the North American Union city of New Liverpool. He was the murdered by the Sons of Liberty, a terrorist organisation, as a distraction during the theft of the Thomas Gainsborough painting The Two Georges from the mansion of the Provincial Governor of Upper California in June 1995. Shockingly, his murder was the fifth by gunfire in New Liverpool since the beginning of the year.
- In the alternative history novel Branch Point by Mona Clee, Richard Nixon was assassinated during the 1968 presidential election campaign, as were Vice President Hubert Humphrey and Senators Robert F. Kennedy and Eugene McCarthy. Running as the American Independent Party candidate, George Wallace, the former Governor of Alabama, won the election that November and became the 37th president. His vice president was the retired USAF General Curtis LeMay.
- In the alternative history anthology Back in the USSA by Kim Newman and Eugene Byrne, Richard Nixon was the fourth president of the United Socialist States of America (USSA), succeeding Barry Goldwater. Nixon served as a parallel to Leonid Brezhnev, as Goldwater was this world's version of Nikita Khrushchev.
- In the television series Futurama, Nixon's head (like the heads of other public figures from the viewers' past and present) has been preserved in a jar of H2OG fat liquid. In the episode "A Head in the Polls", Nixon is elected as the President of Earth in the year 3000. Nixon appears as president in several later episodes, such as "Time Keeps On Slippin'" and "A Taste of Freedom". In "Decision 3012", although Nixon was defeated by Chris Travers, a time-traveler sent back to prevent a robot uprising caused by a disastious Dyson fence project, the resulting time paradox resulted in Nixon winning re-election, seemingly unopposed.
- In the alternative history novel Colonization: Down to Earth as part of the Worldwar series by Harry Turtledove, Richard Nixon was a congressman who represented California. In 1963, Liu Han, a leading member of the Chinese Communist Party, lobbied Nixon and a number of other members of Congress for military aid for his party's resistance against the Race's colonization of China. Congressman Nixon was hesitant to support a communist party due to his ardent anti-communism but was convinced to acquiesce when Liu Han bluntly told him, "You help us, you help people go free from Lizards."
- In the Elseworlds comic book miniseries Superman: Red Son, Richard Nixon defeated John F. Kennedy in the 1960 election but was assassinated in Dallas, Texas on November 22, 1963.
- In one of the alternative timelines featured in Paul Di Filippo's Fuzzy Dice, during the 1972 election campaign, Arthur Bremer attempted to kill President Nixon rather than George Wallace. The assassination attempt drove Nixon into an increasingly paranoid crackdown on real and imagined domestic foes as well as a huge escalation of the Vietnam War, setting off a huge explosion of countrywide riots. A few weeks before the elections, Nixon proclaimed martial law – which only escalated the riots and caused the narrow victory of George McGovern. Nixon died of a stroke at the conclusion of a hate-filled farewell speech. In later centuries, he was remembered as a satanic figure, "The Weasel".
- In another timeline mentioned in Di Filippo's same book, Richard Nixon single-handedly saved the Earth from an alien invasion by letting himself be abducted and experimented upon by extraterrestrials, and was for many centuries thereafter venerated worldwide as "The Savior".
- In the counterfactual history essay "Cuban Crisis: Second Holocaust" by Robert L. O'Connell contained in the anthology What Ifs? of American History, Richard Nixon was elected in 1964. He succeeded John William McCormack as the 37th president, two years after the Cuban Missile Crisis escalated into nuclear war, in which Washington, D.C., was destroyed and the US retaliated drastically by totally destroying the Soviet Union and Cuba, killing 90% of their populations. He became president at a time when the United States was being internationally accused of having perpetrated genocide, the "Second Holocaust" of the title. Nixon won the election after a famous "nothing to be ashamed of" speech, and completely refused any suggestion at nuclear disarmament of the US even though its Soviet foe no longer existed. He presided over the disintegration of NATO, from which all members but the US withdrew, and expelled the United Nations from New York City after all other members of the General Assembly unanimously condemned the US. Nixon declared the 1968 election "a referendum on national security" but was defeated with a huge margin by Eugene McCarthy, who promised "global reconciliation and healing".
- In the parallel universe featured in the comic book newuniversal by Warren Ellis, Richard Nixon defeated John F. Kennedy in the 1960 election.
- In the alternative history novel Settling Accounts: The Grapple by Harry Turtledove, Richard Nixon was a soldier in the United States Army during the Second Great War (1941–1944) who was a specialist in sweeping for surveillance equipment. He was stationed in Philadelphia in 1943. His immediate superior was Sgt. Carl Bernstein.
- In the parallel universe featured in Fringe, Richard Nixon's portrait was used on the silver dollar coins. Furthermore, there was a Nixon Parkway in Manhattan, New York.
- In the alternative history novel The Man Who Prevented WW2 by Roy Carter, Richard Nixon was elected president in 1952. His predecessor was Thomas E. Dewey.
- In the alternative history novel Surrounded by Enemies: What if Kennedy Survived Dallas? by Bryce Zabel, Richard Nixon defeated his Democratic opponent Senator Edmund Muskie of Maine in the 1968 election, becoming the 37th president. His immediate predecessor was John William McCormack, who acceded to the presidency on February 24, 1966, following the impeachment, trial and removal from office of President John F. Kennedy. In November 1969, Nixon reluctantly invited Kennedy to meet the Apollo 11 astronauts Neil Armstrong, Buzz Aldrin and Michael Collins. Nixon was re-elected in 1972 but was impeached himself during his second term. He was succeeded by Ronald Reagan.
- In one of the alternative history timelines featured in The First Fifteen Lives of Harry August, a 2014 novel by Claire North (Catherine Webb), in which technological development was much accelerated in the 1950s and 1960s due to the intervention of a fanatic time-traveler, President Richard Nixon announced that a pill turning the skin of black people inro white would be the ultimate solution to the race problem. This being a minor point in the book's overall plot, there is no detailed description of how Nixon's idea worked out in practice.
- In the film C.S.A.: The Confederate States of America, a 2004 mockumentary directed by Kevin Willmott which depicts a timeline in which the Confederacy won the American Civil War, completely annexed and absorbed the United States, and perpetuated slavery. By 1960, when only 29 percent of voters approve of slavery, Democratic candidate Richard Nixon was defeated by Roman Catholic Republican candidate John F. Kennedy. On the online timeline of the film, it is reveled that Nixon is elected Confederate President in his own right. During his presidency, Nixon travels to China in 1972 (the first time a Confederate President would do so). His talks with the Chinese government would open the way for Confederate-run labor camps to be run in China, which results in cheaper goods being made and imported from China. However, that year on June 17, five men were caught placing wire taps at the Watergate Hotel in order to spy on the Confederate National Committee. As the investigation wore on, it became clear that the orders came from high-up. How high up was unclear until a mysterious anonymous source, using the code name “Dark Throat”, tipped off the CBI that Nixon gave the orders to place the taps. Under pressure from the press and the CBI investigation of the Watergate scandal Nixon was forced to resign from the presidency on August 8, 1974 (as in real life). During his resignation speech he reminded the public, “I am not a Negro!”. Still, years from the event, the mystery surrounding the informant “Dark Throat” is still speculated about. The most popular theory is that one of the White House slaves had overheard the President, and turn against Nixon by turning him in to the CBI. With the penalty of slaves turning against their masters in the Confederacy being death, it is unlikely the informant would ever even be known.
- In the novel The Ground Beneath Her Feet by Salman Rushdie, Richard Nixon is a fictional character from a novel about a fictional Watergate scandal with Nixon having the same role in the novel as he did in real life. This and other differences from reality in Rushdie's book reveals that it is set in an alternative timeline but this is never directly stated as such.
- In the SCP Foundation entry SCP-2736 - The Age of Nixon, California Senator Richard M. Nixon joined a secret society named Magog's Multitude that promised him political prosperity. In June 1951, Nixon was subjected to a violent ritual involving mutilation and live burial, resulting in the creation of two identical versions of Nixon, both retaining the original's memories. One of the Nixons (SCP-2736-2) attempted to sacrifice the other, but the sacrificial Nixon (SCP-2736-1) managed to escape the ritual site and was rescued by SCP Foundation agents undercover in Magog's Multitude. SCP-2736-2 escaped with Magog's Multitude and assumed the life of the original Richard Nixon, furthering his political career and becoming the United States' 36th vice president in 1953 and the 37th president in 1969, while SCP-2736-1 was held in Foundation custody and questioned on the original's involvement with Magog's Multitude. The two Nixons' health were found to be inexplicably linked when the two were concurrently hospitalized in 1974 for phlebitis; on April 21, 1994, SCP-2736-1 and SCP-2736-2 simultaneously suffered a stroke, fell into a deep coma, and died at 21:08 EST the following day.
- In the shared alternate history of Ill Bethisad (1997 and after), Richard Milhouse Nixon was a used-car salesman living in Ill Bethisad's version of Los Angeles (which is located in a country called "Alta California" as the United States does not exist in that timeline, instead its territory is taken by several other countries). Nixon was a local celebrity and frequently claimed honesty in his sales with his catchphrase being "I am not a crook". He was however in one major scandal where the breaks of a car he sold suddenly failed while driving and it crashed into the gate of the local water recycling plant. Nixon had tried (and failed) to cover-up the incident and it became known as the "water's gate" affair.
- In a Marvel Comics storyline published in 1973 and 1974, the Secret Empire (a villainous organization) gets a new "Number One" (the title given to the group's leader) who then infiltrates Roxxon Oil's Brand Corporation, tries to ruin superhero Captain America's reputation and sets up one of their agents "Moonstone" as Captain America's replacement. By the orders of the supervillain Number One, the Secret Empire then kidnaped several superheroes and supervillains (all of them mutants) to harness their mutant energy to power a flying saucer. Number One then flies the saucer to the White House and stages a "fight" against Moonstone who is "defeated" as previously agreed to by both. After this, Number One then demands that the United States government surrender control to him, threatening to detonate nuclear weapons in every major American city if they don't. The plot is foiled when superheroes Captain America, Cyclops, the Falcon, and Marvel Girl arrive and Captain America chases Number One into the White House. Rather than get captured by Captain America, Number One then unmasked himself (the reader does not see his face), then committed suicide. When the U.S. governments discover that Number One was actually one of their highest ranking officials attempting a coup d'état, They cover it up and replace the dead official with a body double who will live out the rest of his life as the official. While the story does mention his name or not directly state his position in the government, Number One is implied to none other than the then-sitting President Richard Nixon with this story being published at a time when he was involved in the Watergate scandal which would later force him to resign. The story's writer, Steve Engelhart intended the story as a metaphor of the Watergate case and the Nixon era.
- In the alternate history For All Mankind, the Soviet Union launches the first successful moon landing in 1969, beating the Apollo 11 mission. Believing that he would be blamed for "tripping at the goal line", Richard Nixon endorses the establishment of a permanent US lunar base (even engineering the discrediting of critic Wernher von Braun as a former Nazi to achieve this) and initiates the recruitment of female astronauts (nicknamed "Nixon's Women") after the Soviet Union also becomes the first nation to put a woman on the Moon. Nixon is defeated in the 1972 election by Ted Kennedy, who pardons him for his role in the break-in at the Watergate Complex.
- In the alternate history novella anthology Then Everything Changed by Jeff Greenfield, Richard Nixon is a key character in two of its featured stories.
  - Following John F. Kennedy's assassination as President-elect by Richard Paul Pavlick in a suicide bombing on December 11, 1960, Richard Nixon supported the election of Vice President-elect Lyndon B. Johnson as president by the Electoral College to maintain stability (due to the absence of a constitutional mechanism to determine presidential succession) albeit reasserting allegations of voter fraud in Illinois and Texas during an emergency meeting to discuss the peaceful succession. After the Johnson administration's handling of the Cuban Missile Crisis escalated into a 'Sixty Minute War' in which the first use of nuclear weapons in active combat since the Second World War resulted in the destruction of the Guantanamo Bay Naval Base and Sevastopol, Nixon was elected Governor of California in 1962, although the turnout in that year's midterm elections reached a record low of 13% amid growing public pessimism for the future.
  - After Stephen Smith saved Robert F. Kennedy from an assassination attempt by Sirhan Sirhan on June 5, 1968, Kennedy went on to defeat Eugene McCarthy and Hubert Humphrey for the Democratic nomination. In anticipation of Kennedy's nomination, Nixon nominated Mayor of New York City John Lindsay as his running mate and registered to vote in California. However, Lindsay's response to that year's teachers' strike in New York City undermined the Nixon campaign. Kennedy went on to defeat both Richard Nixon and George Wallace in that year's presidential election. To demonstrate his strength against Communism, Kennedy appoints Nixon as a special envoy to normalize relations between the United States and the People's Republic of China.
- In the audio comedy drama series Space: 1969 and Space: 1972, Richard Nixon served as the series' narrator. By 1969, Nixon was serving as a will and probate lawyer in New York while John F. Kennedy had been elected to a third term (following the repeal of the Twenty-fifth Amendment) over Ronald Reagan in a landslide. Persuaded by H. R. Haldeman to seek the presidency after Kennedy's twelve years in power dominated by aggressive expansionism in space, Nixon became manager of a branch of Shakey's Pizza on the US Moon base as a pretext for becoming its mayor as a stepping stone. Embroiled in the machinations of the future Kennedy Space Empire and the Resistance movement against it, Nixon was targeted in a foiled assassination attempt during a visit to the base by Kennedy. Remaining manager of Shakey's operations in space after the position of Moon Mayor was dissolved when the base became a military outpost, Nixon returned to Earth in 1972, on the advice of Haldeman, to canvass for Republican candidates in the 1972 elections in a bid to become the US Delegate for Space. At risk of losing the position to Spiro Agnew, Nixon with the aid of new confidante Henry Kissinger established a Shakey's branch on the Sino-Soviet space station to renew his credentials. While the station was destroyed during the branch's grand opening as Kennedy engineered a war to revive his floundering 1972 election campaign, Nancy and Mike Kranick manage to use the "Pizza Pie" metal instrumental to the Kennedy Space Empire's power to alter reality. Nixon finds himself as the incumbent President, and as the only person other than Nancy to remember the aborted timeline, hiring Nancy as his nurse to keep her in his confidence.

=== Albert Jay Nock ===
- In the alternative history novel The Probability Broach as part of the North American Confederacy Series by L. Neil Smith in which the United States became a libertarian state after a successful Whiskey Rebellion and George Washington being overthrown and executed by firing squad for treason in 1794, Albert Jay Nock served as the 18th president of the North American Confederacy from 1912 to 1928.

=== Chuck Norris ===
- Chuck Norris serves as president in Andrew Cartmel novel: "Doctor Who: The New Adventures: Warhead". He ended immigration to the United States, and presided over the establishment of Local Development laws which prevented the unemployed from leaving their local area to find work.

=== George W. Norris ===
- In Ward Moore's 1953 novel Bring the Jubilee, George Norris is mentioned as the sitting president in 1940. A member of the Populist Party, he was elected in 1936 but declined to run for a second term in the 1940 election.

=== Oliver North ===
- In the alternative history Dark Future novel series by Kim Newman, North is president in 1995. His predecessor was Charlton "Big Chuck" Heston.
- In a parallel universe featured in the Sliders Season One episode "Summer of Love", the United States lost the Battle of the Coral Sea to the Empire of Japan on May 10, 1942. Japan proceeded to invade Australia. After the defeat of Nazi Germany, the Soviet Union liberated North Australia whereas the United States liberated South Australia. While the United States rebuilt their portion of Australia, the Soviets continued their occupation of North Australia and created a communist state. In the early 1990s, the Australian War broke out when North Australia attacked South Australia. President North unofficially joined the war to prevent the fall of South Australia to North Australia, which was backed militarily by the Soviet Union. As the war dragged on with no sign of either victory or peaceful resolution, it became increasingly unpopular in the United States and, by 1995, the hippie movement, centered in the Haight-Ashbury district of San Francisco, had spread throughout the US and beyond.
- In a parallel universe featured in the Sliders Season Three episodes "The Exodus, Part I" and "The Exodus, Part II", North was the president in 1997. In this universe, the Soviet Union had never collapsed and the Cold War lasted until 1997, at which time all life on Earth (with the exception of 150 people who escaped to another universe) was wiped out by the radiation from a pulsar.
- In Canadian Bacon, an attempt to instigate a new Cold War against Canada to improve the President's approval ratings almost results in a nuclear exchange between the United States and Russia after aggrieved weapons manufacturer R.J. Hacker attempts to blackmail and deceive the US Government into paying one trillion dollars for a program to cancel the unauthorized activation of American missile silos. The unnamed President (played by Alan Alda) loses re-election to Oliver North, who pardons former National Security Advisor Stuart "Stu" Smiley for his accidental killing of Hacker whilst trying to seize the deactivation program.
- North succeeded George H. W. Bush as the 42nd president after the latter died of pneumonia in an alternative timeline during Walt Simonson's run on Fantastic Four.

=== Devin Nunes ===
- In the novella And the Last Trump Shall Sound by Harry Turtledove, James K. Morrow and Cat Rambo, Devin Nunes ran in the 2032 presidential election as the Republican nominee, having previously served as Speaker of the House. Incumbent President Mike Pence circumvented the 22nd Amendment, running as Nunes' running mate and serving for a third term following Nunes' brief presidency and resignation. Nunes' home state of California had seceded from the United States in 2031 as part of Pacifica, established by the Democratic state governments of California, Oregon and Washington in opposition to the extremist policies of the Trump and Pence administrations.

== O ==
=== Barack Obama ===
- According to the Fringe Season One finale "There's More Than One of Everything", Obama was elected as president in 2008 in the parallel universe featured on the series. In May 2009, Obama, his wife Michelle and their daughters Malia and Sasha were preparing to move into the recently rebuilt White House. The original version of the traditional presidential residence had been destroyed in the September 11, 2001 attacks perpetrated by al-Qaeda whereas the Pentagon had been severely damaged. In contrast, the World Trade Center in New York City remained standing.
- In Franz Ferdinand Lives! A World Without World War I (2014) by Richard Ned Lebow in which neither World War I nor World War II took place, Obama was elected Governor of Hawaii in 2008 and served two highly successful terms. In the 1990s, because of the US-Japanese Cold War, many demanded that Japanese residents and Japanese Americans be either detained or deported. Following a riot in Los Angeles, the Republican president announced that everyone of Japanese descent had 30 days to leave the country. Those with green cards were allowed to remain but were ordered to report to transport to detention camps until tensions subsided. Governor Obama considered these measures to be gross overreactions and called upon the government to make public any evidence that it had of a security threat posed by people of Japanese descent. The United States Attorney General refused to do so on the grounds of national security and did not respond to Obama's request to be briefed on camera. In response, Obama set his plan in motion: Japanese Americans were invited to turn themselves in, take up residence in resort hotels along Oahu's Waikiki Beach and limit their movement to Waikiki and Honolulu's immediate downtown. Other civic groups organised a "Parade of Freedom" in which citizens of diverse ancestry peacefully demonstrated their support for the United States Constitution and its guarantees against detention without charge. A small counter-demonstration ensued but public opinion overwhelmingly supported Governor Obama. The Japanese government threatened to expel all Americans from Japan and arrest a prominent businessman and his wife on charges of spying. Evidence of the couple's activities is given to the press and the American media became divided over whether the couple were truly spies or were being set up. Obama insisted that the federal government foot the bill for room and board at resort hotels for Japanese Americans. The president considered sending the Hawaii National Guard to clear the hotels and move the Japanese Americans to a detention camp. Students, religious leaders and other citizens held round-the-clock visits at the hotels, meaning that any military action would have involved arresting them and further alienating the state's population. Consequently, the president backed down and negotiated a compromise agreement whereby Japanese tourists and expatriates would be quietly repatriated and Japanese residents would be allowed to return to their homes in Hawaii. However, militarily sensitive areas in the state were declared off-limits. Relations with Japan gradually improved and, in the interim, none of its citizens were arrested or charged with a crime.
- In the first episode of The Last Ship, Barack Obama died from the Red Flu shortly after the breakout of the disease. Following his death, Vice President Joe Biden succeeded him before he also died from the disease a week later. After Biden's death, he was replaced by President August, the former fictitious Speaker of the House of Representatives, who delivers the news via teleconference to the USS Nathan James. Although neither he nor Obama are mentioned by name in the series, a printed news article in the Season 2 episode "Safe Zone" shows Obama as the incumbent President before the outbreak, meeting with the newly appointed Secretary of Housing and Urban Development Jeffery Michener (who also goes on to serve as president later in the series).
- In The Death of Basketball, a short story based on events simulated in the NBA 2K14 video game, Barack Obama remains President for the entire duration of the story, implying that he successfully removed the two-term limit and has been forcing the NBA to continue by decree in spite of the league having entered a "Dark Era" upon the 2033 retirements of Nerlens Noel and Anthony Davis, the last remaining truly competent players from before the Doomsday draft classes started bringing down the quality of play.

=== Malia Obama ===
- Malia Obama is president in 2035 in the series finale of Life On Mars. Frank Morgan at Mission Control stated that she had gone with her sister to Chicago to be with their ailing father Barack Obama rather than witness humans landing on Mars at Mission Control. Although not specifically identified, Malia would meet the minimum age requirement of 35 by 2033, assuming no changes to the Constitution of the United States or the United States presidential line of succession before July 4, 2033, by being at most Speaker of the United States House of Representatives.

=== Michelle Obama ===
- In the episode "The Rad Awesome Terrific Ray" on the 2020 Hulu animated series Solar Opposites, Michelle Obama is president in an alternate timeline.

=== Twin Presidents Mary-Kate and Ashley Olsen ===
- The Olsen Twins are mentioned as both being President, though not seen by the Ghost of Christmas Future in A Dennis the Menace Christmas.

=== Osceola ===
- In the alternative history novel The Probability Broach as part of the North American Confederacy Series by L. Neil Smith in which the United States became a libertarian state after a successful Whiskey Rebellion and George Washington being overthrown and executed by firing squad for treason in 1794, Osceola served as the 9th President of the North American Confederacy from 1842 to 1848. After Sequoyah Guess, he was the second Native American to hold the office of the presidency.
