= What If? 2 (essays) =

2001 counterfactual history anthology book by Robert Cowley

- First edition cover
- Editor: Robert Cowley
- Language: English
- Series: What If?
- Genre: Alternate history
- Publisher: G.P. Putnam's Sons
- Publication date: 2001
- Publication place: United States
- Media type: Print (paperback)
- ISBN: 0-399-14795-0
- Preceded by: What If?
- Followed by: What Ifs? of American History

What If? 2, subtitled More What If?: Eminent Historians Imagine What Might Have Been, is an anthology of twenty-five essays dealing with counterfactual history. It was published by G.P. Putnam's Sons in 2001, ISBN 0-399-14795-0, and edited by Robert Cowley. It is the successor of What If? It was combined with the original What If? in The Collected What If?

== Essays ==
- "Socrates Dies at Delium, 424 BC" by Victor Davis Hanson
  - What if Socrates had died before his philosophy was written down by Plato?
- "Not by a Nose" by Josiah Ober
  - What if Antony and Cleopatra had won the Battle of Actium?
- "Pontius Pilate Spares Jesus" by Carlos M. N. Eire
  - What if Jesus had not been crucified and instead lived into old age?
- "Repulse at Hastings, October 14, 1066" by Cecelia Holland
  - What if William had not conquered England?
- "The Chinese Discovery of the New World, 15th century" by Theodore F. Cook, Jr.
  - What if Zheng He's expeditions had been allowed to continue?
- "Martin Luther Burns at the Stake, 1521" by Geoffrey Parker
  - What if Martin Luther had been sentenced to death at the Diet of Worms?
- "If Charles I Had Not Left Whitehall, August 1641" by Theodore K. Rabb
  - What if the English king had died from an outbreak of plague in 1641?
- "Napoléon's Invasion of North America" by Thomas Fleming
  - What if yellow fever had not decimated the French forces in Haiti in 1802?
- "If Lincoln Had Not Freed the Slaves" by Tom Wicker
  - What if there was no Emancipation Proclamation?
- "France Turns the Other Cheek, July 1870" by Alistair Horne
  - What if there had been no Franco-Prussian War?
- "The Election of Theodore Roosevelt, 1912" by John Lukacs
  - What if Roosevelt had received the Republican nomination for President over incumbent William Howard Taft in 1912?
- "The Great War Torpedoed" by Robert L. O'Connell
  - What if German Chancellor Theobald von Bethmann Hollweg had not prevented the Imperial German Navy from continuing unrestricted submarine warfare after the Sinking of the RMS Lusitania?
- "No Finland Station" by George Feifer
  - What if Lenin had been stopped before he arrived at Petrograd?
- "The Luck of Franklin Delano Roosevelt" by Geoffrey C. Ward
  - What if FDR's life or circumstances had been different in the 20th century? (Seven counterfactual scenarios are presented here.)
- "The War of 1938" by Williamson Murray
  - What if Britain and France had declared war on Nazi Germany after the invasion of Czechoslovakia?
- "Prime Minister Halifax" by Andrew Roberts
  - What if Lord Halifax had been Prime Minister instead of Churchill?
- "The Boys Who Saved Australia, 1942" by James Bradley
  - What if the Japanese had won the Kokoda Track campaign?
- "Enigma Uncracked" by David Kahn
  - What if Bletchley Park had failed to crack the Wehrmacht Enigma code?
- "Pius XII Protests The Holocaust" by Robert Katz
  - What if the Vatican had been more forceful against the Nazi regime?
- "VE Day—November 11, 1944" by Caleb Carr
  - What if Patton and Montgomery's armies had been allowed to advance into Germany after D-Day rather than pursue a "broad front" strategy?
- "The Führer in the Dock" by Roger Spiller
  - What if Hitler had lived to stand trial?
- "No Bomb, No End" by Richard B. Frank
  - What if Operation Olympic had proceeded on November 1, 1945?
- "The Presidency of Henry Wallace" by James Chace
  - What if Franklin Roosevelt had not chosen Harry S. Truman as his 1944 running mate?
- "A Tale of Three Congressmen, 1948" by Lance Morrow
  - What if Nixon, Johnson, and Kennedy had chosen different paths than they did?
- "What if Pizarro Had Not Found Potatoes in Peru?" by William H. McNeill

== Reviews ==
- "As a mental exercise or from simple curiosity, it is not uncommon to wonder what might have happened if an event had ended other than as history records." —Washington Times
- "A follow-up to the 1999 book by prominent historians who each examine a key moment in history and theorize how a slight turn of fate at a decisive moment could have changed history. The first book helped give alternate history its 'serious' look, and this book should cement that." —USA Today

== See also ==
- What If? (essays)
- What Ifs? of American History
