= James M. McPherson bibliography =

American Civil War historian

The following is a list of the published works of James M. McPherson, an American Civil War historian.

== Works ==
External videos
- Booknotes interview with McPherson on What They Fought For, 1861-65, May 22, 1994, C-SPAN
- Presentation by McPherson on For Cause and Comrades, May 21, 1998, C-SPAN
- Discussion with McPherson on Battle Cry of Freedom, July 10, 2000, C-SPAN
- Presentation by McPherson on the illustrated version of Battle Cry of Freedom, November 3, 2003, C-SPAN
- Presentation by McPherson on Hallowed Ground: A Walk at Gettysburg, June 25, 2003, C-SPAN
- Presentation by McPherson on This Mighty Scourge: Perspectives on the Civil War, February 28, 2007, C-SPAN
- Presentation by McPherson on Crossroads of Freedom: Antietam, September 11, 2008, C-SPAN
- Presentation by McPherson on Tried by War: Abraham Lincoln as Commander-in-Chief, October 8, 2008, C-SPAN
- Discussion with McPherson on War on the Waters: The Union and Confederate Navies, 1861-1865, October 4, 2012, C-SPAN
- Presentation by McPherson on Embattled Rebel: Jefferson Davis as Commander in Chief, October 10, 2014, C-SPAN

- The Struggle for Equality: Abolitionists and the Negro in the Civil War and Reconstruction. Princeton, NJ: Princeton University Press, 1964 (1st ed.); 1995 (2nd ed., with a new preface by the author); 2014 (paperback, with a new preface by the author).
- The Negro's Civil War: How American Negroes Felt and Acted During the War for the Union. New York: Pantheon Books, 1965.
- Marching Toward Freedom: The Negro in the Civil War, 1861-1865. New York: Knopf, 1968 (1st ed.); New York: Facts on File, 1991 (revised and updated ed.).
- The Abolitionist Legacy: From Reconstruction to the NAACP. Princeton, NJ: Princeton University Press, 1975 (1st ed.); 1995 (2nd ed., with a new preface by the author).
- Ordeal by Fire: The Civil War and Reconstruction. New York: Knopf, 1982 (1st ed.); New York: McGraw-Hill, c1992 (2nd ed.); c2001 (3rd ed.), c2010 (4th ed.). ISBN 9780070458376 ISBN 9780070458383
- Lincoln and the Strategy of Unconditional Surrender. Gettysburg, PA: Gettysburg College, 1984.
- How Lincoln Won the War with Metaphors. Fort Wayne, IN: Louis A. Warren Lincoln Library and Museum, 1985.
- Battle Cry of Freedom: The Civil War Era. New York: Oxford University Press, 1988 (1st ed.); New York: Ballantine Books, 1989 (1st Ballantine Books ed.); New York: Oxford University Press, 2003 (Illustrated ed.) ISBN 0-19-515901-2; New York: Oxford University Press. ISBN 9780195168952.
- Abraham Lincoln and the Second American Revolution (essays). New York: Oxford University Press, 1991. ISBN 9780195076066 ISBN 9780195055429
- What They Fought For, 1861-1865. Baton Rouge: Louisiana State University Press, 1994. ISBN 9780807119044
- Drawn with the Sword: Reflections on the American Civil War (essays). New York: Oxford University Press, 1996. ISBN 9780195096798
- For Cause and Comrades: Why Men Fought in the Civil War. New York: Oxford University Press, 1997. ISBN 9780195090239
- Is Blood Thicker than Water?: Crises of Nationalism in the Modern World. Toronto: Vintage Canada, c1998. ISBN 9780679309284
- Crossroads of Freedom: Antietam. Oxford; New York: Oxford University Press, 2002. ISBN 9780195135213 ISBN 9780195173307 ISBN 9780965461184
- Fields of Fury: The American Civil War. New York: Atheneum Books for Young Readers, 2002.
- Hallowed Ground: A Walk at Gettysburg. New York: Crown Journeys, 2003. ISBN 9780609610237
- This Mighty Scourge: Perspectives on the Civil War (essays). New York: Oxford University Press, 2007. ISBN 9780195313666
- Tried by War: Abraham Lincoln as Commander in Chief. New York: The Penguin Press, 2008. ISBN 9780143143604
- Abraham Lincoln. Oxford University Press, 2009. ISBN 9780195374520
- War on the Waters: The Union and Confederate Navies, 1861-1865. Chapel Hill: The University of North Carolina Press, 2012. ISBN 9780807835883
- Embattled Rebel: Jefferson Davis as Commander in Chief. Penguin Press, 2014. ISBN 9781594204975
- The War That Forged a Nation: Why the Civil War Still Matters. Oxford University Press, 2015. ISBN 0199375771

== As editor or contributor ==
- Blacks in America: Bibliographical Essays by James M. McPherson and others. 1st ed. Garden City, N.Y., Doubleday, 1971.
- Region, Race, and Reconstruction: Essays in Honor of C. Vann Woodward, edited by J. Morgan Kousser and James M. McPherson. New York: Oxford University Press, 1982.
- Battle Chronicles of the Civil War, James McPherson, editor; Richard Gottlieb, managing editor. 6 vols. New York: Macmillan Pub. Co.; London: Collier Macmillan Publishers, c1989.
- American Political Leaders: From Colonial Times to the Present, by Steven G. O'Brien; editor, Paula McGuire; consulting editors, James M. McPherson, Gary Gerstle. Santa Barbara, Calif.: ABC-CLIO, c1991. ISBN 978-0874365702.
- Why the Confederacy Lost, edited by Gabor S. Boritt; essays by James M. McPherson et al. New York: Oxford University Press, 1992.
- Gettysburg: The Paintings of Mort Künstler, text by James M. McPherson. Atlanta, GA: Turner Publishing, c1993.
- The Atlas of the Civil War, edited by James M. McPherson. New York: Macmillan, c1994.
- "We Cannot Escape History": Lincoln and the Last Best Hope of Earth, edited by James M. McPherson. Urbana: University of Illinois Press, 1995. ISBN 978-0-252-02190-9.
- The American Heritage New History of the Civil War, narrated by Bruce Catton; edited and with a new introduction by James McPherson. New York: Viking, 1996. ISBN 978-0670781454.
- Personal Memoirs of U.S. Grant, by Ulysses S. Grant; with an introduction and notes by James M. McPherson. New York: Penguin Books, 1999. ISBN 978-0140437010.
- Encyclopedia of Civil War Biographies, edited by James M. McPherson. 3 vols. Armonk, NY: Sharpe Reference, c2000. ISBN 978-0765680211.
- To the Best of My Ability: The American Presidents, edited by James M. McPherson and David Rubel. London: Dorling Kindersley, c2000, ISBN 978-0789450739.
- "If the Lost Order Hadn't Been Lost: Robert E. Lee Humbles the Union, 1862", in What If?: The World's Foremost Military Historians Imagine What Might Have Been, Robert Cowley, ed. G. P. Putnam's Sons, 1999.
  - Reprinted in What Ifs? of American History: Eminent Historians Imagine What Might Have Been, Robert Cowley, ed. G. P. Putnam's Sons, 2003.
- "A. Lincoln, Commander in Chief", in Foner, Eric, ed. Our Lincoln: New Perspectives on Lincoln and His World. W. W. Norton & Co., 2008. ISBN 978-0-393-06756-9
