= What Ifs? of American History =

2003 book by Theodore K. Rabb

- First edition cover
- Editor: Robert Cowley
- Language: English
- Series: What If?
- Genre: Alternate history
- Publisher: G.P. Putnam's Sons
- Publication date: 2003
- Publication place: United States
- Media type: Print
- ISBN: 0-399-15091-9
- Preceded by: What If? 2

What Ifs? of American History, subtitled Eminent Historians Imagine What Might Have Been, is a collection of seventeen essays dealing with counterfactual history regarding the United States. It was published by G.P. Putnam's Sons in 2003, ISBN 0-399-15091-9, and this book as well as its two predecessors, What If? and What If? 2, were edited by Robert Cowley.

== Essays ==
- "Might the Mayflower Not Have Sailed?" by Theodore K. Rabb
  - What if the Mayflower had not set sail from England in 1620?
- "William Pitt the Elder and the Avoidance of the American Revolution" by Caleb Carr
  - What if Parliament had pursued a more conciliatory policy regarding the Thirteen Colonies' war debts?
- "What the Fog Wrought: The Revolution's Dunkirk, August 29, 1776" by David McCullough
  - What if George Washington's retreat after the Battle of Long Island had not succeeded? (This essay is a reprint from What If?)
- "'His Accidency' John Tyler" by Tom Wicker
  - What if the tenth President of the United States had not assumed the full power of the presidency after the death of his predecessor, William Henry Harrison?
- "Lew Wallace and the Ghosts of the Shunpike" by Victor Davis Hanson
  - What if General Wallace's reinforcement of General Grant at the Battle of Shiloh had been successful?
- "If the Lost Order Hadn't Been Lost: Robert E. Lee Humbles the Union, 1862" by James M. McPherson
  - What if Lee had succeeded in destroying the Army of the Potomac? (This essay is a reprint from What If?)
- "The Northwest Conspiracy" by Thomas Fleming
  - What if the Copperheads in Illinois, Indiana, and Ohio had succeeded in inciting protest against the Lincoln administration?
- "Beyond the Wildest Dreams of John Wilkes Booth" by Jay Winik
  - What if Booth's co-conspirators had succeeded in assassinating Johnson and Seward?
- "The Revolution of 1877" by Cecelia Holland
  - What if the Great Railroad Strike of 1877 had turned into a full-blown worker's uprising?
- "The Whale Against the Wolf: The Anglo-American War of 1896" by Andrew Roberts
  - What if the United Kingdom and the United States went to war over the border dispute between Venezuela and British Guiana?
- "No Pearl Harbor? FDR Delays the War" by John Lukacs
  - What if Japan had not attacked Pearl Harbor?
- "If Eisenhower Had Gone to Berlin" by Antony Beevor
  - What if the Allied armies had not stopped at the Elbe?
- "Joe McCarthy's Secret Life" by Ted Morgan
  - What if Senator McCarthy had done more damage than he did?
- "If the U-2 Hadn't Flown" by George Feifer
  - What if there had been no U-2 flight on May 1, 1960?
- "The Cuban Missile Crisis: Second Holocaust" by Robert L. O'Connell
  - What if the Crisis had spiraled into World War III?
- "JFK Lives" by Robert Dallek
  - What if President Kennedy had not been assassinated in 1963?
- "What if Watergate Were Still Just an Upscale Address?" by Lawrence Malkin and John F. Stacks
  - What if the Watergate break-in had not been discovered?

== Reviews ==
- "Great for history buffs not quite ready for fiction, it is suitable for public libraries and general academic collections."—Library Journal.
- "In this interesting book, the latest in a series using the same gimmick, experts speculate on how things might have worked out differently if some pivotal historical event had not happened." —New York Times.

== See also ==
- What If?
- What If? 2
