= Windshield obstruction laws =

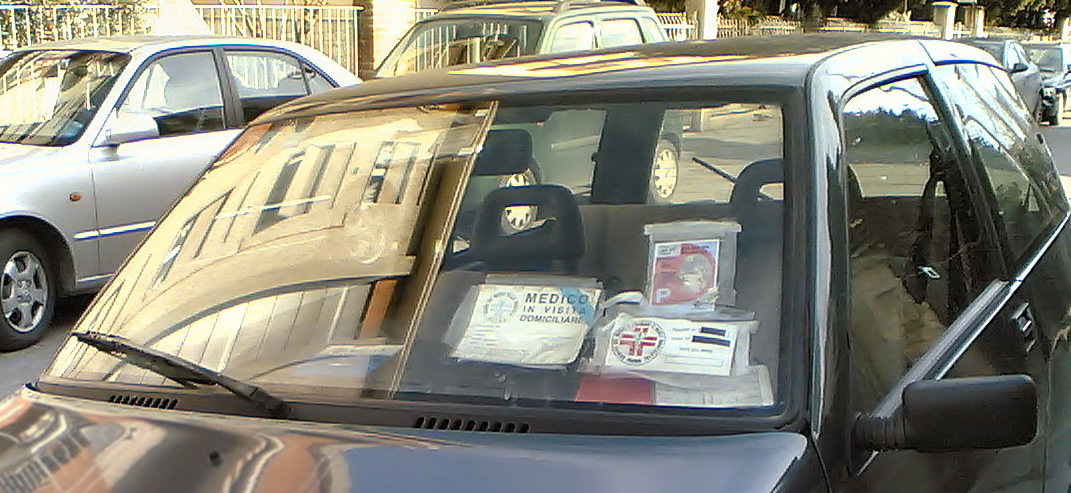
Windshield

Some legislations ban the placement of articles, devices and other paraphernalia on the windshields of vehicles.

== United Kingdom ==
Various limitations are in force relating to the visibility through the windscreen and driver and passenger windows, including a substantial ban on tinting.

== United States ==
Over half of all states have windshield obstructions laws.

=== California ===
California prohibits the placement of anything on the windshield or side-mirrors of a car that obstruct the view of the driver, with certain exceptions. These exceptions include toll payment devices, glare shields (for those with approved doctor notices) and small obstructions such as stickers placed in the lower corners. Drivers are allowed to have objects dangling from rearview mirrors, so long as the object does not impede the driver's clear view of the roadway.

=== Minnesota ===
Minnesota has strict laws defined by Minnesota statute §169.71 regarding obstruction of the windshield and side-mirrors, but they have come under scrutiny for their vague nature and difficulty for tech-savvy drivers.

=== New Hampshire ===
New Hampshire prohibits driving a vehicle "with any sign, poster, sticker, or other nontransparent material upon or adjacent to the front windshield... which shall obstruct the driver's clear view of the way or any intersecting way."

=== New Jersey ===
New Jersey prohibits windshield obstructions under 39:3-74 : "No person shall drive any motor vehicle with any sign, poster, sticker or other non-transparent material upon the front windshield, wings, deflectors, side shields, corner lights adjoining windshield or front side windows of such vehicle other than a certificate or other article required to be so displayed by statute or by regulations of the commissioner. No person shall drive any vehicle so constructed, equipped or loaded as to unduly interfere with the driver's vision to the front and to the sides.".

Examples of violations include items hanging from the rear view mirror such as religious objects, fuzzy dice, air fresheners, or electronic devices. Electronic toll collection equipment such as E-ZPass transponders can also be considered a violation by law enforcement.

Ideally, a windshield obstruction summons is issued in lieu of a more serious traffic infraction which would have incurred points and raised insurance costs, such as speeding or running a red light. However, unlike in other states, it can be issued without any other cause or suspicion.

=== Pennsylvania ===
Pennsylvania windshield obstructions are covered under Title 75, §4524 : "Obstruction on front windshield.--No person shall drive any motor vehicle with any sign, poster or other nontransparent material upon the front windshield which materially obstructs, obscures or impairs the driver's clear view of the highway or any intersecting highway except an inspection certificate, sticker identification sign on a mass transit vehicle or other officially required sticker...". Subsection f gives exception to police video and audio recording equipment and also exempts law enforcement of Pennsylvania's felony all-party consent recording laws.

== See also ==
- Road safety
- Traffic enforcement camera
