= What If? (essays) =

1999 book edited by Robert Cowley

- First edition cover
- Editor: Robert Cowley
- Language: English
- Series: What If?
- Genre: Alternate history
- Publisher: G.P. Putnam's Sons
- Publication date: 1999
- Publication place: United States
- Media type: Print (paperback)
- ISBN: 0-399-14576-1
- Followed by: What If? 2

What If?, subtitled The World's Foremost Military Historians Imagine What Might Have Been, also known as What If? The World's Foremost Historians Imagine What Might Have Been, is an anthology of twenty essays and fourteen sidebars dealing with counterfactual history. It was published by G.P. Putnam's Sons in 1999, ISBN 0-399-14576-1, and this book as well as its two sequels, What If? 2 and What Ifs? of American History, were edited by Robert Cowley. It was later combined with What If? 2 to form The Collected What If?.

Cowley decided to create the book after several "What if?" articles were published in the Military History Quarterly, which he edits, and received much attention.

== Essays ==
- "Infectious Alternatives" by William H. McNeill
  - What if a plague had not forced the Assyrians to withdraw from their siege of Jerusalem in 701 BC?
- "No Glory That Was Greece" by Victor Davis Hanson
  - What if the Persians had won the Battle of Salamis?
- "Conquest Denied" by Josiah Ober
  - What if Alexander the Great had died at the Battle of the Granicus River?
- "Furor Teutonicus: The Teutoburg Forest, A.D. 9" by Lewis H. Lapham
  - What if Varus had defeated Arminius at the Battle of the Teutoburg Forest?
- "The Dark Ages Made Lighter" by Barry S. Strauss
  - What if the battles of Adrianople in 378 and Poitiers in 732 had been won by the Romans and the Muslims, respectively?
- "The Death That Saved Europe" by Cecelia Holland
  - What if Ogadai Khan had not died in 1241 on the eve of the Mongol siege of Vienna?
- "If Only It Had Not Been Such a Wet Summer" by Theodore K. Rabb
  - What if Suleiman the Magnificent had begun his 1529 siege of Vienna earlier in the year?
- "The Immolation of Hernán Cortés" by Ross Hassig
  - What if Cortés had been killed or his expedition into Aztec-dominated Mexico had failed? (The essay discusses La Noche Triste, the near-destruction of Cortés' force in 1520, as a key possibility of a point of divergence.)
- "The Repulse of the English Fireships" by Geoffrey Parker
  - What if the Spanish Armada had successfully landed in England?
- "Unlikely Victory" by Thomas Fleming
  - What if the Americans lost the Revolutionary War? (Thirteen ways are presented here.)
- "What the Fog Wrought" by David McCullough
  - What if George Washington and his forces had not escaped after losing the Battle of Long Island?
- "Ruler of the World" by Alistair Horne
  - What if Napoleon Bonaparte had chosen to do several things differently?
- "If the Special Order 191 Hadn't Been Lost" by James M. McPherson
  - What if Robert E. Lee hadn't lost Special Order 191 during the Maryland Campaign and had been able to march through the Union state of Pennsylvania and the border state of Maryland without fighting the Battle of Antietam?
- "A Confederate Cannae and Other Scenarios" by Stephen W. Sears
  - What if the Civil War had not lasted as long as it did? (Five ways are presented here.)
- "The What Ifs of 1914" by Robert Cowley
  - What if the United Kingdom had remained neutral in World War I? (This and four other possibilities are presented here.)
- "How Hitler Could Have Won the War" by John Keegan
  - What if the Wehrmacht had turned toward the Middle East instead of the Soviet Union?
- "Our Midway Disaster" by Theodore F. Cook, Jr.
  - What if the Japanese had won the Battle of Midway?
- "D Day Fails" by Stephen E. Ambrose
  - What if the Allied invasion of Europe had failed in June 1944?
- "Funeral in Berlin" by David Clay Large
  - What if American and not Soviet forces had taken Berlin in 1945? What if the Berlin airlift had failed? What if German reunification had occurred in 1952? Etc.
- "China Without Tears" by Arthur Waldron
  - What if the Chinese Civil War had ended with Chiang Kai-shek not marching to retake Manchuria from Mao Zedong and the Communists?

== Reviews ==
- "Probably the most interesting nonfiction historical fiction was What If?: The World's Foremost Military Historians Imagine What Might Have Been (Putnam, 1999). Its editor, Robert Cowley, persuaded two dozen historians to write essays on how a slight turn of fate at a decisive moment could have changed the very annals of time." —The New York Times
- "The essays collected in What If? are sober extrapolations from historical fact. Even so, they're a lot of fun. They remind us of the slender threads on which our past hangs. One small break—at Poitiers or on Long Island, at Gettysburg or in Berlin—might have unraveled the entire tapestry of modern history." —CNN
- "Those and other provocative 'counterfactuals' are the topic of the intriguing What if?, a compilation of essays by 34 distinguished historians... Each essay testifies to the fact that history hangs by a thread." —Houston Chronicle

== See also ==
- What If? 2
- What Ifs? of American History
