= ¿Qué hubiera pasado si...? =

Argentine counterfactual history book

Book cover

¿Qué hubiera pasado si...? (in English, What would have happened if...?) is a counterfactual history Argentine book written by Rosendo Fraga. The book speculates on how would the History of Argentina have developed if certain key events did not take place or had happened in a different way.

== Description ==
Among other things, the book speculates what would have happened if the viceroyalty of the Río de la Plata wasn't created, if the British invasions of the Río de la Plata did not fail, if José de San Martín had obeyed the Supreme Directors and returned with the Army of the Andes to fight Artigas instead of taking the independentist war to Peru, if the Conquest of the Desert did not take place, if the different coup d'états that took place in Argentina did not happen or were defeated, and if Argentina had obtained the sovereignty of the Malvinas. Each chapter starts with a basic premise but speculates as well on related possibilities that could have influenced changes: for example, the one on San Martin questions as well what would have happened if the government of Chile fell, if a Spanish task force arrived to take Buenos Aires, and what stance could have the caudillos taken in those hypothetic scenarios.
