= Fictional history =

Fictional history may refer to:

- Alternate history, a subgenre of speculative fiction
- Counterfactual history, a form of historiography
- Backstory, events preceding the plot of a story
  - Origin story, the backstory of how a character became a protagonist or antagonist
- Historical fiction, a literary genre
- Pseudohistory, a form of pseudoscholarship
