= Plausible Worlds =

1991 book by Geoffrey Hawthorn

- Author: Geoffrey Hawthorn
- Language: English
- Subject: Counterfactual history
- Publisher: Cambridge University Press
- Publication date: August, 1991 (hardcover)
- Publication place: United Kingdom
- Media type: Hardcover, Paperback
- Pages: 206 pages (hardcover)
- ISBN: 0-521-40359-6 (hardcover)
- OCLC: 22664059
- Dewey Decimal: 901 20
- LC Class: D16.9 .H39 1991

Plausible Worlds: Possibility and Understanding in History and the Social Sciences is a 1991 book by Geoffrey Hawthorn, professor of sociology at the University of Cambridge. The book is credited with legitimizing the academic field of counterfactual history.

The book explores three points of divergence: the Black Death, the Korean War, and the influence of Duccio.
