= Geoffrey Hawthorn =

Geoffrey Hawthorn (28 February 1941 in Slough – 31 December 2015) was a British Professor on International Politics and Social and Political Theory and Head of the Department of Political Sciences and International Politics at the University of Cambridge, as well as a reputed author.

== Education ==
Hawthorn studied at Jesus College, Oxford (BA) and the London School of Economics and Political Science (MA).

== Academic career ==
Hawthorn was a lecturer in Sociology at the University of Essex, 1964–1970. In 1970 he began a longstanding academic association with the University of Cambridge: lecturer in sociology, 1970–1985; reader in Sociology and Politics, 1985–1998; professor of International Politics, 1998–2007; fellow, Churchill College, 1970–1976; fellow, Clare Hall since 1982. Visiting professor of sociology at Harvard University between 1973 and 1974 and between 1989 and 1990; visiting member of the Institute for Advanced Study at Princeton, New Jersey, 1989–1990. As from 2007 he was an emeritus professor of International Politics and Social and Political Theory at the University of Cambridge. According to Stefan Collini in Hawthorn's obituary at The Guardian: "It is thanks to him more than to any other individual that Cambridge now boasts a flourishing Department of Politics and International Studies". He was a member of the editorial board of the Cambridge Review of International Affairs.

== Publications ==
- The Sociology of Fertility, London, Collier-Macmillan, 1970
- Enlightenment and Despair, Cambridge, Cambridge University Press, 1976, 1987
- Population and Development, Cambridge, Cambridge University Press, 1977
- The Standard of Living, Cambridge, Cambridge University Press, 1987
- Plausible Worlds: Possibility and Understanding in History and the Social Sciences, Cambridge, Cambridge University Press, 1991
- The Future of Asia and the Pacific, Cambridge, Cambridge University Press, 1998
- Thucydides on Politics, Cambridge, Cambridge University Press, 2014.

His ideas on contrafactual history are well known and have been highly influential. Hawthorn was also the author of numerous papers in learned journals and other periodicals.

== Recognition ==
In 1998 he delivered the British Academy's Master-Mind Lecture. The Department of Political Sciences and International Politics of the University of Cambridge instituted the Geoffrey Hawthorn Prize in memory of its founding Head. This prize is awarded to the student with the highest average on a graduate paper.
