= Richard B. Frank =

American historian (born 1947)

Richard B. Frank (born November 11, 1947) is an American lawyer and military historian.

Born in Kansas, Frank graduated from the University of Missouri in 1969, after which he served four years in the United States Army. During the Vietnam War, he served a tour of duty as a platoon leader of the 101st Airborne Division. In 1976, he graduated from the Georgetown University Law Center.

== Bibliography ==
Frank has written several books and articles on the Pacific campaign of World War II and Southeast Asia:

=== Books ===
- Guadalcanal: The Definitive Account of the Landmark Battle (1990)—Won the General Wallace M. Greene Award from the U.S. Marine Corps
- Downfall: The End of the Imperial Japanese Empire (1999). ISBN 9780141001463.
- MacArthur (2007). ISBN 9781403976581.
- Frank, Richard B. (2020). Tower of Skulls: A History of the Asia-Pacific War, July 1937–May 1942 (First ed.). New York: W. W. Norton & Company. ISBN 9781324002109.

=== Articles ===
- "No Bomb, No End", in What If? 2 (2001).
- "Why Truman Dropped the Bomb", The Weekly Standard (August 8, 2005): p. 20.
- "George Polk's Real World War II Record", Washington Examiner (February 26, 2007)
