= Tower of Skulls =

2020 book by Richard B. Frank

Tower of Skulls: A History of The Asia-Pacific War July 1937-May 1942
- Author: Richard B. Frank
- Cover artist: Chris Welch
- Language: English
- Genre: Nonfiction
- Publisher: W. W. Norton & Company
- Publication date: 2020
- Publication place: United States
- Pages: 751
- ISBN: 978-1-324-00210-9

Tower of Skulls: A History of The Asia-Pacific War July 1937-May 1942 is a 2020 nonfiction book written by American military historian Richard B. Frank. It is the first volume released of a planned trilogy covering the Pacific Theater of the Second World War. The full text is divided into 18 chapters. This volume recounts the first five years of the Second Sino-Japanese War starting with the Marco Polo Bridge Incident up until just before the Battle of the Coral Sea.

== Background ==
The book's title comes from a quote in a letter written by the Bengali poet Rabindranath Tagore in 1938 to the Japanese poet Yonejirō Noguchi stating "You are building your conception of an Asia which would be raised on a tower of skulls," as Tagore compared Japan's ongoing conquest as emulating the ruthlessness of the Timurid Empire's founder Timur.

== Reception ==
Naval War College Review, US Naval Institute, The New York Review of Books, and the Literary Review published positive reviews.
