= Robert Cowley =

American military historian

Robert Cowley is an American military historian, who writes on topics in American and European military history ranging from the American Civil War through World War II. He has held several senior positions in book and magazine publishing and is the founding editor of MHQ: The Quarterly Journal of Military History; Cowley has also written extensively and edited three collections of essays in counterfactual history known as What If?

As part of his research, he has traveled the entire length of the Western Front, from the North Sea to the Swiss border.

== Early life and education ==
Cowley is the son of prominent writer and literary critic Malcolm Cowley and Muriel Mauer. He attended Phillips Exeter Academy in New Hampshire, graduating in 1952. Thereafter, he earned an A.B. degree in history in 1956 from Harvard College in Massachusetts.

== Personal life ==
He was married to Blair Cowley; they later divorced and she remarried to artist Paul Resika. They had two daughters, Elizabeth and Miranda. Miranda Cowley Heller, is married to film producer and director Bruno Heller, son of screenwriter Lukas Heller and grandson of political philosopher Hermann Heller. Cowley was married to Susan Cheever, daughter of novelist John Cheever from 1967 to 1975. He married Edith Lorillard, daughter of Elaine Lorillard, who founded the Newport Jazz Festival, in 1978. They have two daughters, Olivia Wassenaar and Savannah Cowley.

== Works ==
- 1918: Gamble for Victory. The Greatest Attack of World War I, by Robert Cowley, New York: Macmillan Books, 1964. OCLC 3860691
- Fitzgerald and the Jazz Age, by Malcolm Cowley and Robert Cowley, New York: Scribner, 1966.
- The Rulers of Britain, by Robert Cowley, New York: Stonehenge Press, 1982, ISBN 0-86706-068-9.
- Experience of War, ed. Robert Cowley, New York: Random House, 1993, ISBN 0-440-50553-4
- The Reader's Companion to Military History, by Robert Cowley and Geoffrey Parker, New York: Houghton Mifflin, 1996, ISBN 978-0-618-12742-9
- No End Save Victory: Perspectives on World War II, edited by Robert Cowley, New York: Putnam, 2001, ISBN 978-0-425-18338-0 OCLC 44932120
- With My Face to the Enemy: Perspectives on the Civil War, ed. Robert Cowley, New York: Putnam, 2001, ISBN 978-0-7126-7946-6 OCLC 45375993
- West Point: Two Centuries of Honor and Tradition, edited by Robert Cowley and Thomas Guinzburg, New York: Warner Books, 2002. ISBN 0-446-53018-2 OCLC 49748770
- The Great War: Perspectives on the First World War, ed. Robert Cowley, New York: Random House, 2003, ISBN 978-1-84413-419-9
- The Cold War, ed. Robert Cowley, New York, Random House, 2006, ISBN 978-0-8129-6716-6
- What If? The World's Most Foremost Military Historians Imagine What Might Have Been, ed. Robert Cowley, New York: Putnam, 1999, ISBN 0-425-17642-8 OCLC 41338197
- What If? 2 Eminent Historians Imagine What Might Have Been, ed. Robert Cowley, New York: Putnam, 2001, ISBN 0-399-14795-0
- What Ifs? of American History, ed. Robert Cowley, New York: Putnam, 2003, ISBN 0-399-15091-9
