= Fuzzy dice =

Automobile decoration

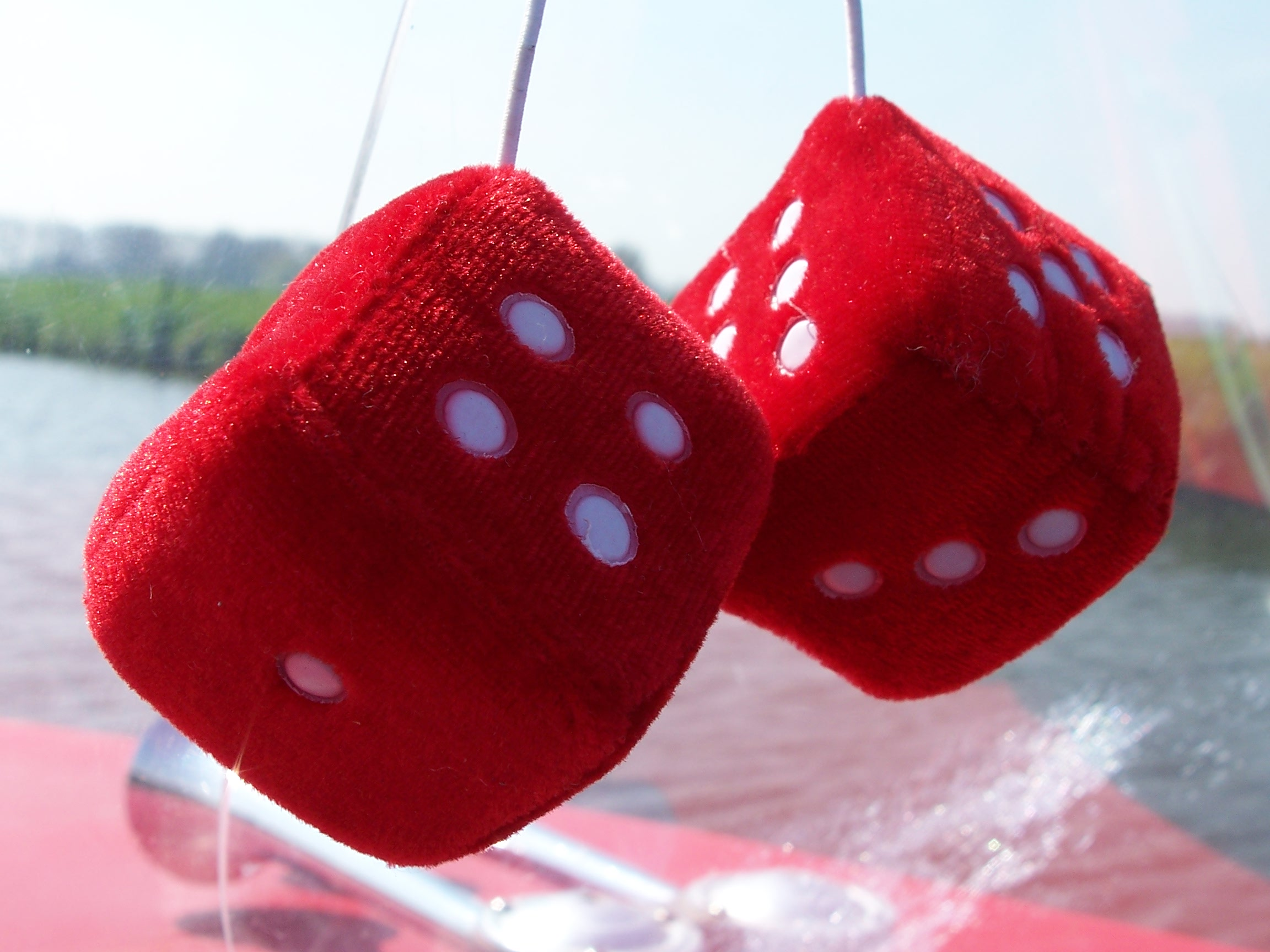
A pair of fuzzy dice

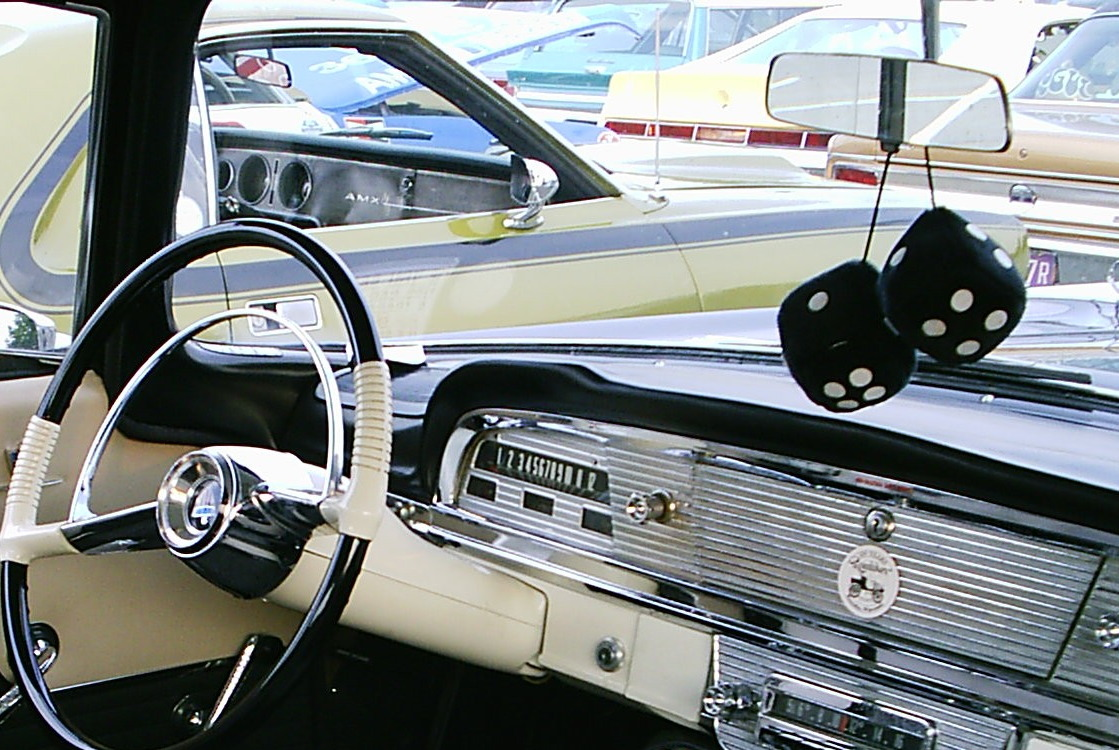
A pair of fuzzy dice hanging from a car's rearview mirror

Fuzzy dice, also known as fluffy dice, soft dice, or stuffed dice, are an automotive decoration consisting of two oversized (usually six-sided) plush dice that hang from the rearview mirror. The original fuzzy dice used in the 1950s were white and approximately 3 inches (8 cm) across. Nowadays, fuzzy dice come in many colors and various sizes.

== Origin and history ==
The use of fuzzy dice is believed to be traced back to American fighter pilots during World War II. Pilots would hang the dice above their instruments, displaying seven pips, before a 'sortie' mission for good luck. It is also speculated that the dice represented a high degree of risk associated with the fighter sorties; hundreds of pilots were shot down each week. Upon returning after the war, many airmen continued the tradition.

In the 1950s, the fuzzy dice became one of the first items sold specifically to be hung from a rearview mirror. The Encyclopedia of American Social History notes that during the 1950s, young adults were drawn to cars that were "customized for speed, painted with vivid colors, stripes, and flames, tuck-and-roll interiors, fuzzy dice suspended from the mirror, rock-and-roll on the radio...".

Another explanation for hanging these in a car has been proposed that "displaying the dice meant the driver was ready and willing to be 'dicing with death' in the dangerous and unregulated world of street racing".

In some segments, such as the lowrider community, research indicated that even the most dedicated individuals "did not attach any significance to the dice" that were hung from their car's rearview mirror.

A 1993 study found no correlation between the use of fuzzy dice and the degree of a driver's reckless driving behavior.

In some jurisdictions, suspending objects from rearview mirrors is illegal.

A technology upgrade to the product includes illuminated LED plastic dice that change colors.

== See also ==
- Effects of the car on societies
