= Thomas Fleming (historian) =

American writer and historian

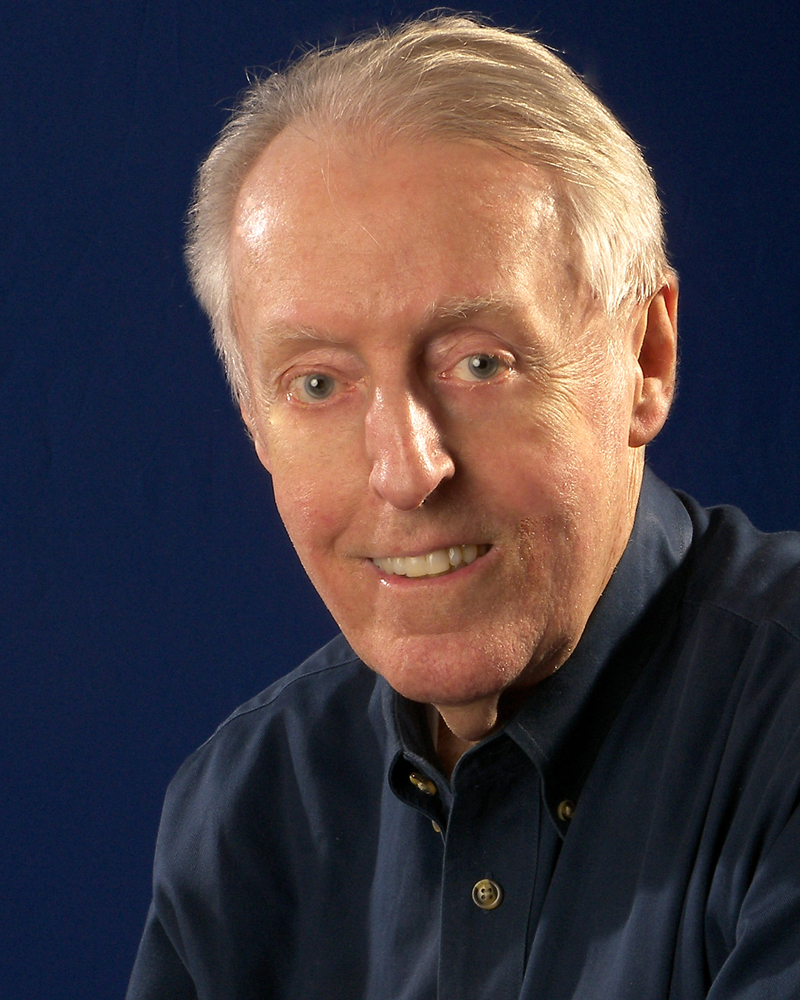
- Thomas Fleming in 2009
- Born: Thomas James Fleming; July 5, 1927; Jersey City, New Jersey, U.S.
- Died: July 23, 2017 (aged 90); New York City, U.S.
- Education: St. Peter's Preparatory School; Fordham University
- Occupations: Historian, novelist
- Writing career
- Notable works: The Officers' Wives; Washington's Secret War: The Hidden History of Valley Forge
- Website: www.thomasflemingwriter.com

Thomas James Fleming (July 5, 1927 – July 23, 2017) was an American historian and historical novelist and the author of over forty nonfiction and fiction titles. His work reflects a particular interest on the American Revolution, with titles such as Liberty! The American Revolution And The Future Of America, Duel: Alexander Hamilton, Aaron Burr, and the History of America and Washington's Secret War: The Hidden History of Valley Forge.

== Biography ==
A native of Jersey City, New Jersey, Fleming graduated from St. Peter's Preparatory School in 1945 and from Fordham University in 1950, serving a year in the United States Navy before he started college. While in the navy, he served aboard the USS Topeka (CL-67).

Fleming served as president of the Society of American Historians and the PEN American Center. Fleming also spent ten years as chairman of the New York American Revolution Round Table and was an Honorary Member of the New York State Society of the Cincinnati from 1975. He lived in New York with his wife, Alice, a writer of books for young people.

Fleming published books about various events and figures of the Revolutionary era. He also wrote about other periods of American history, and wrote over a dozen well-received novels set against various historical backgrounds. He said, "I never wanted to be an Irish-American writer, my whole idea was to get across that bridge and be an American writer".

That was my first really strong exposure to America's secular idealism. These guys have this ideal of duty, honor, country, but in the real world, in the Army, a lot of other things are going on. There's throat-cutting careerism, hostility from the civilian community, and always the possibility that at the bottom line, there's going to be a body bag.

Fleming died at his home in New York City on July 23, 2017, at the age of 90.

== Controversy over Haitian history ==
Thomas Fleming caused controversy when writing, on History News Network, about Haitian history, and describing president Dessalines as a "very angry black man". In a piece written by Alyssa Goldstein Sepinwall about Haitian History in the aftermath of Jean-Rolph-Trouillot's Silencing the Past, she comments on the different depiction of Dessalines and Thomas Jefferson in the article: "Haitian slaves were savage barbarians, while slaveowners’ crimes remained shrouded in silence."

== Bibliography ==
=== Histories ===
- Cowpens: "Downright Fighting": the Story of Cowpens. Washington, DC: Division of Publications, National Park Service, U.S. Dept. of the Interior. 1988. ISBN 0912627336.
- Now We Are Enemies
- Beat the Last Drum: The Siege of Yorktown 1781
- One Small Candle: The Pilgrims' First Year In America. New York: W. W. Norton & Co., 1963.
- Washington's Secret War: The Hidden History of Valley Forge. New York: Smithsonian Books/Collins. 2005. ISBN 0060829621. OCLC 61529854.
- The Perils of Peace: America’s Struggle to Survive After Yorktown
- The Irish-American Chronicle
- The New Dealers’ War: FDR and the War Within World War II
- The Illusion of Victory: America in World War I. New York: Basic. 2003. ISBN 046502467X.*
- Duel: Alexander Hamilton, Aaron Burr and the Future of America
- Liberty! The American Revolution
- The Louisiana Purchase. Hoboken, NJ: John Wiley & Sons. 2003. ISBN 0471267384.
- The Man from Monticello: An Intimate Life of Thomas Jefferson
- The Man Who Dared the Lightning: A New Look at Benjamin Franklin
- Benjamin Franklin: A Life in His Own Words (ed.)
- The Forgotten Victory: The Battle for New Jersey–1780
- The First Stroke: Lexington, Concord, and the Beginning of the American Revolution
- West Point: The Men and Times of the U.S. Military Academy
- 1776: Year of Illusions
- The Intimate Lives of the Founding Fathers
- George Washington: The General from Profiles in Leadership (ed. Walter Isaacson)
- A Disease in the Public Mind: A New Understanding of Why We Fought the Civil War. New York: Da Capo Press. 2013. ISBN 9780306821264. OCLC 808413574.
- The Great Divide: The Conflict between Washington and Jefferson That Defined a Nation. Da Capo Press. 2015. ISBN 9780306821271. OCLC 880889261.
- The Strategy of Victory: How George Washington Won the American Revolution. New York: Da Capo Press, 2017. ISBN 978-0-306-82496-8. OCLC 1008913772

=== Novels ===
- Liberty Tavern
- Dreams of Glory
- The Spoils of War
- Rulers of the City
- A Passionate Girl
- Promises to Keep
- Remember The Morning
- The Wages of Fame
- When This Cruel War Is Over. New York: Forge. 2001. ISBN 9780812576450. OCLC 50793815.
- The Secret Trial of Robert E. Lee
- The Officers’ Wives
- Time and Tide
- Over There
- Loyalties: A Novel of World War II
- All Good Men
- The God of Love

== Sources ==
- Who's Who in America
- Contemporary Authors, v. 7–8
- Contemporary Literary Criticism, v. 37
- B.U. Bridge newspaper, Volume 5, No. 4, 28 September 2001
