= Cecelia Holland =

American writer

- Born: December 31, 1943 (age 82); Henderson, Nevada, U.S.
- Education: Connecticut College (BA); Columbia University
- Occupation: Novelist
- Writing career
- Language: English
- Genre: Historical fiction

Cecelia Holland (born December 31, 1943) is an American historical novelist.

== Early life and education ==
Holland was born December 31, 1943, in Henderson, Nevada. She grew up in Metuchen, New Jersey, where she started writing at age 12, recording the stories she made up for her own entertainment. From the beginning, she focused on history because "being twelve, I had precious few stories of my own. History seemed to me then, as it still does, an endless fund of material."

Holland attended Pennsylvania State University for a year, and received her Bachelor of Arts degree in 1965 from Connecticut College, where she took a course in creative writing and was encouraged by poet William Meredith and short story writer David Jackson. Jackson took a novel Holland wrote for his seminar to an editor at Atheneum, and her first novel, The Firedrake, was published in 1966. She had just dropped out of graduate school at Columbia University to work as a clerk at Brentano's in Manhattan. Holland has been a full-time professional writer ever since. The Firedrake was the fourth novel she had written, but was the first published; Jerusalem is the final, mature version of one of these earlier ones. Pieces of the other two also have made their way into her published work.

== Literary style ==
David Jackson of The New York Review of Books wrote that "a feeling for physical and mental action ... is the main strength in Cecelia Holland’s work". He also. noted, "Holland takes a view of a forceful and well-known time, and then she creates a hero usually to the left and a pace behind, a hero who is often more clever than the great mover and doer to whom he is attached, or by whom he is threatened. She does not have heroes sacrificing themselves for moral integrity, knowing that most moral integrities are recent inventions".

In the Autumn 2002 issue of the Historical Novel Society magazine, Solander, Sarah Johnson wrote, "What sets Cecelia's work apart in the genre is not just her productivity but also her versatility; she has the unique ability to make most any historical period her own."

She records the often harsh details of life in the distant or recent past and her depiction of it involves considerable research. Her character-driven plots often are developed from the viewpoint of a male protagonist. While including plenty of action (her battle scenes are noteworthy for their bottom-up viewpoint and understated verisimilitude), her work focuses on the life of the mind, whatever that might mean in a particular culture, and especially on politics, in the broadest sense, whatever politics might be in a monarchial, feudal or tribal society.

In her medieval novels in particular, she makes her characters, including Huns and Mongols, speak in colloquial English. This is intended to give the reader the impression of listening in on a conversation in the speakers' own vernacular.

Most of her novels have grown slowly in the back of her mind, often as the result of articles and essays written by her. The Belt of Gold and The Lords of Vaumartin, however, were written "cold" as the result of requests by her editor. While she claims not to choose fictional settings based on their infrequent usage by other writers, she has said, "I wouldn't dare do the Civil War, because it's so well known, every damn detail, it would be so stifling."

Floating Worlds (1976), is a science fiction novel written in a similar style. It is an epic novel set in approximately the 40th century AD, by which time a colonized Solar System hosts a variety of political systems. Paula Mendoza, an ex-prisoner from anarchist Earth, becomes a diplomat and the lover of one of the Styth, a variant human subspecies who live in floating cities.

== Personal life ==
During the late 1990s, Publishers Weekly described Holland as a "bohemian den mother" and historical novelist who had written 24 books. As of 2011, Holland lived in Fortuna, a small town in rural Humboldt County, California. She has three daughters and five grandchildren. For ten years, Holland taught two three-hour creative writing classes a week at Pelican Bay State Prison in Crescent City, California. She was visiting professor of English at Connecticut College in 1979. Holland was awarded a Guggenheim Fellowship in 1981–1982.
