= Counterfactual history =

Study of historical events that never happened

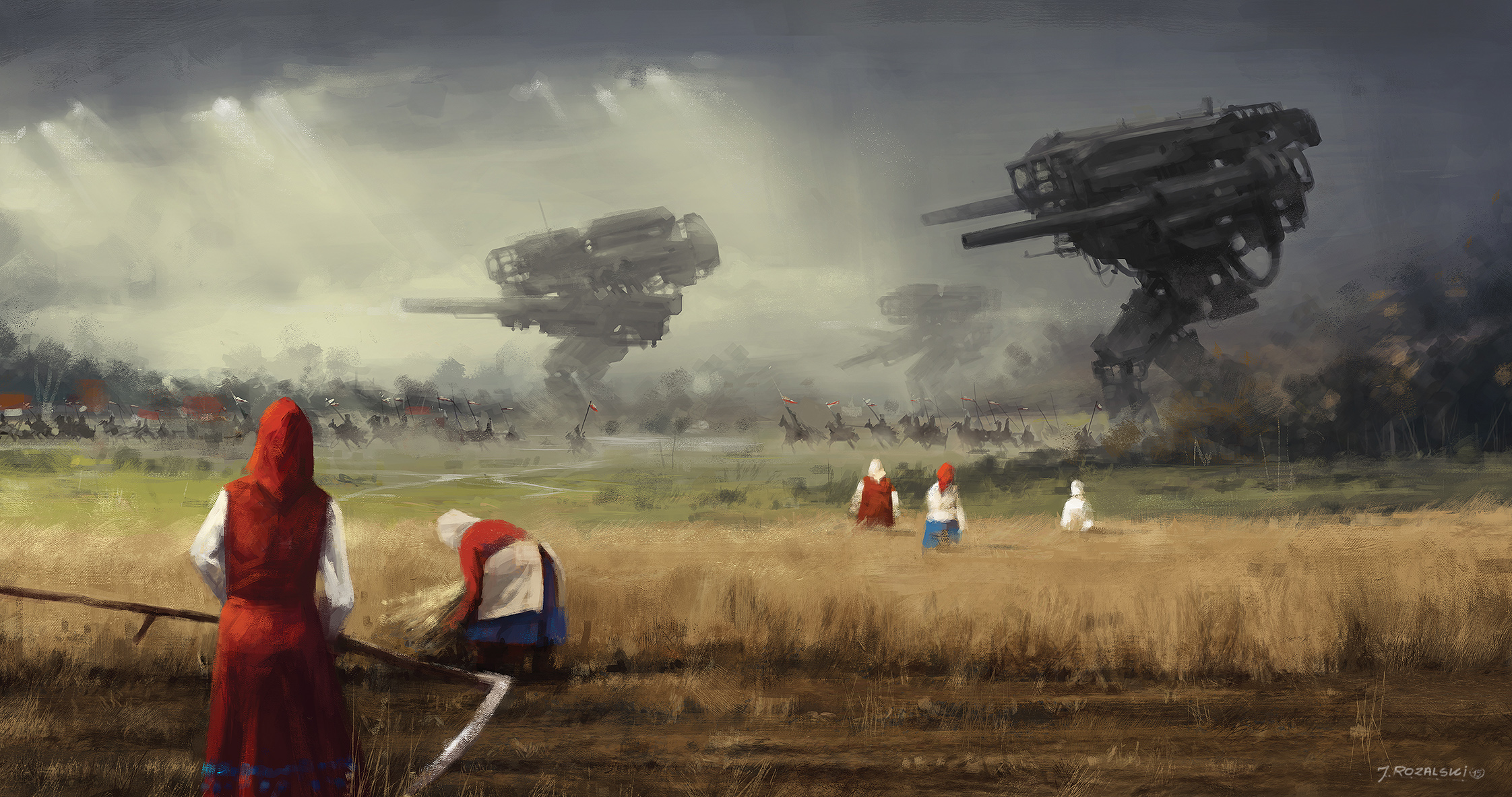
A painting by Jakub Różalski depicts an alternate history of the 1920s, in which rural peasants must contend with giant mechanical walking tanks.

Counterfactual history (also virtual history) is a form of historiography that attempts to answer the What if? questions that arise from counterfactual conditions. Counterfactual history seeks by "conjecturing on what did not happen, or what might have happened, in order to understand what did happen." It has produced a literary genre which is variously called alternate history, speculative history, allohistory, and hypothetical history.

== Development ==
An early book of counterfactual histories is If It Had Happened Otherwise (1931) which features "If Lee Had Not Won the Battle at Gettysburg", by Winston Churchill, about a fictional Confederate victory at the Battle of Gettysburg (1863). As a text of counterfactual histories written by historians, If It Had Happened Otherwise contains works of alternative history—fictional reinterpretations of historical events—because the narrative tone tends to whimsy, and offers neither historical analysis nor the logic behind such What if? scenarios.

In Railroads and American Economic Growth: Essays in Econometric History, Robert Fogel applied quantitative methods to imagine the U.S. economy of 1890 had there been no railroads. That in the absence of the railroad in the U.S., the great system of canals would have been expanded and the roads would have been paved and improved into a reliable transport system; both improvements would have diminished the social and economic importance of the railroad, because “the level of per capita income achieved by January 1, 1890 would have been reached by March 31, 1890, if railroads had never been invented.”

Few further attempts to bring counterfactual history into the world of academia were made until the 1991 publication of Plausible Worlds: Possibility and Understanding in History and the Social Sciences by the Cambridge sociologist Geoffrey Hawthorn, who carefully explored three different counterfactual scenarios. This work helped inspire Virtual History: Alternatives and Counterfactuals (1997), a collection of essays exploring different scenarios by a number of historians, edited by the historian Niall Ferguson. Ferguson has become a significant advocate of counterfactual history, using counterfactual scenarios to illustrate his objections to deterministic theories of history such as Marxism, and to put forward a case for the importance of contingency in history, theorizing that a few key changes could result in a significantly different modern world. A series of "What If?" books edited by Robert Cowley presented dozens of essays by historians or prominent writers about "how a slight turn of fate at a decisive moment could have changed the very annals of time."

Some scholars argue that a counterfactual is not as much a matter of what happened in the past but it is the disagreement about which past events were most significant. For example, William Thompson employs a sequence of counterfactuals for eight lead economies that have driven globalization processes for almost a thousand years. From Song dynasty in China to Genoa, Venice, Spain, Portugal, the Netherlands, Britain, and the United States, and claims that each actor in succession played an unusually critical role in creating a structure of leadership that became increasingly global in scope across time.

=== Differences from alternate history ===
Counterfactual history is neither historical revisionism nor alternate history.

Counterfactual history distinguishes itself through its interest in the very incident that is being negated by the counterfactual, thus seeking to evaluate the event's relative historical importance. Historians produce arguments subsequent changes in history, outlining each in broad terms only, since the main focus is on the importance and impact of the negated event.

An alternate history writer, on the other hand, is interested precisely in the hypothetical scenarios that flow from the negated incident or event. A fiction writer is thus free to invent very specific events and characters in the imagined history.

An example of a counterfactual question would be: "What if the Pearl Harbor attack did not happen?"; whereas an alternate history writer would focus on a possible series of events arising therefrom.

The line is sometimes blurred as historians may invent more detailed timelines as illustrations of their ideas about the types of changes that might have occurred. But it is usually clear what general types of consequences the author thinks are reasonable to suppose would have been likely to occur, and what specific details are included in an imagined timeline only for illustrative purposes.

The line is further blurred by novelists such as Kim Stanley Robinson, whose alternate-history novel The Years of Rice and Salt has a character talking of historians' use of counterfactuals, within the novel's alternate history. He dismisses this as "a useless exercise".

== Criticism ==
Most historians regard counterfactual history as perhaps entertaining, but not meeting the standards of mainstream historical research due to its speculative nature. Advocates of counterfactual history often respond that all statements about causality in history contain implicit counterfactual claims—for example, the claim that a certain military decision helped a country win a war presumes that if that decision had not been made, the war would have been less likely to be won, or would have been longer.

Richard Evans provides a systematic critique of the concept in his book Altered Pasts. In his view most counterfactuals are written by right wing historians engaging in wishful thinking either describing a hoped for present or to discredit left-wing ideology. He claims that reducing outcomes to a single cause ignores the complexity of influences on outcomes. In contrast Christopher Prendergast believes that counterfactuals have the important role of testing explanations of historical causality by exploring the implication of alternatives.

Aviezer Tucker has offered a range of criticism of this approach to the study of the past both in his review of Ferguson's Virtual History in History and Theory and in his book Our Knowledge of the Past: A Philosophy of Historiography. Tucker rejected the use of multi-causal counterfactuals stating that every counterfactual should be posed as "ceteris paribus", everything else remaining the same.

== See also ==
- Jonbar hinge
- Stalin's Missed Chance
- Wargame
- What If? (essays)
