= List of LGBTQ-themed speculative fiction =

Many science fiction and fantasy stories involve LGBT characters, or otherwise represent themes that are relevant to LGBT issues and the LGBT community. This is a list of notable stories, and/or stories from notable series or anthologies, and/or by notable authors; it is not intended to be all-inclusive.

== Novels with LGBT characters and themes, alphabetical by author surname ==
Title	Author	Year	LGBT content
Empire of the Senseless	Kathy Acker	1988	Bisexual main character
The Dark Light Years	Brian Aldiss	1964	Gender-shifting aliens, gay male characters
All the Birds in the Sky	Charlie Jane Anders	2016	Non-binary and asexual characters
Virgin Planet	Poul Anderson	1959	All-female world, lesbian characters
The Gods Themselves	Isaac Asimov	1972	Alien species with three sexes
The Skolian Saga/Major Bhaajan Mysteries	Catherine Asaro	1995–2020	Lesbian, gay, bisexual primary or secondary characters, positive portrayals
The Handmaid's Tale	Margaret Atwood	1985	Lesbian character
Shadowdance	Robin Wayne Bailey	1991	Gay protagonist
Queer Free	Alabama Birdstone (pseudonym)	1981	Homophobic dystopia
Tithe: A Modern Faerie Tale	Holly Black	2002	Gay major characters
Darkover Series	Marion Zimmer Bradley	1962–1988	Gay and lesbian protagonists
The Heritage of Hastur	Marion Zimmer Bradley	1975	Gay male protagonist and antagonist
The Shattered Chain	Marion Zimmer Bradley	1976	All-female society, lesbian themes
Warrior Woman	Marion Zimmer Bradley	1985	Lesbian main characters, positive portrayal of lesbian relationships
Beauty Queens	Libba Bray	2011	Transgender and lesbian major characters
A Civil Campaign	Lois McMaster Bujold	1999	Transgender character
Ethan of Athos	Lois McMaster Bujold	1986	Gay male protagonist
The Wanting Seed	Anthony Burgess	1962	Homophobic dystopia
Dawn	Octavia Butler	1987	Alien race that has three sexes, polyamorous marriages
Fledgling	Octavia Butler	2005	Bisexual characters
Patternmaster	Octavia Butler	1976	Bisexual female protagonist
An Anglo-American Alliance	Gregory Casparian	1906	A trans man marries his early love, and they live happily ever after.
The Amazing Adventures of Kavalier & Clay	Michael Chabon	2000	Gay protagonist
Spartan Planet	Bertram Chandler	1969	All-male world, gay characters
The Conqueror's Child	Suzy McKee Charnas	1999	All-female world
The Furies	Suzy McKee Charnas	1994	All-female world
Motherlines	Suzy McKee Charnas	1978	All-female world
Walk to the End of the World	Suzy McKee Charnas	1974	All-female world
The Mortal Instruments series	Cassandra Clare	2007–2014	One of the protagonist's best friends is gay, and has a relationship with a bisexual warlock.
Imperial Earth	Arthur C. Clarke	1976	Bisexual/gay male protagonist
Sardia: A Story of Love	Cora Linn Morrison Daniels	1891	Bisexual female vampire is the protagonist.
Babel-17	Samuel R. Delany	1966	Bisexual major characters, poly relationships
Dhalgren	Samuel R. Delany	1975	Bisexual major character and other LGBT characters
The Einstein Intersection	Samuel R. Delany	1967	Gay major character
Equinox	Samuel R. Delany	1973	Gay major character
Stars In My Pocket Like Grains Of Sand	Samuel R. Delany	1984	Gay major character
Through the Valley of the Nest of Spiders	Samuel R. Delany	2012	Gay major characters
Triton	Samuel R. Delany	1976	
The Door Into Fire	Diane Duane	1979	Major bisexual characters
Solitaire	Kelley Eskridge	2002	Lesbian protagonist
Infinity's Web	Sheila Finch	1985	Lesbian protagonist
Casket of Souls	Lynn Flewelling	2012	Gay main characters
Luck in the Shadows	Lynn Flewelling	1996	Gay main characters
Shadows Return	Lynn Flewelling	2008	Gay main characters
Shards of Time	Lynn Flewelling	2014	Gay main characters
Stalking Darkness	Lynn Flewelling	1997	Gay main characters
Traitor's Moon	Lynn Flewelling	1999	Gay main characters
The White Road	Lynn Flewelling	2010	Gay main characters
Daughters of a Coral Dawn	Katherine V. Forrest	1984	All-female world, lesbian protagonists
Bouncing Off the Moon	David Gerrold	2001	
The Man Who Folded Himself	David Gerrold	1973	
Halfway Human	Carolyn Ives Gilman	1998	
Herland	Charlotte Perkins Gilman	1915	All-female utopic world
The Gilda Stories	Jewelle Gomez	1991	Lesbian main character
The Kappa Child	Hiromi Goto	2001	
Ammonite	Nicola Griffith	1992	All-female world with mainly lesbian characters
Slow River	Nicola Griffith	1995	Lesbian main character
Nontraditional Love	Rafael Grugman	2008	Alternative future where heterosexuality is outlawed
The Forever War	Joe Haldeman	1974	Future society where homosexuality is the norm
Champion of the Scarlet Wolf, Book One and Book Two (Cadeleonian Series 3, 4)	Ginn Hale	2014	Gay protagonists
Lord of the White Hell, Book One and Book Two (Cadeleonian Series 1, 2)	Ginn Hale	2010	Gay protagonists
The Rifter 1: The Shattered Gates	Ginn Hale	2012	Gay protagonists
The Rifter 2: The Holy Road	Ginn Hale	2012	Gay protagonists
The Rifter 3: His Sacred Bones	Ginn Hale	2013	Gay protagonists
Wicked Gentlemen	Ginn Hale	2007	Gay protagonists
The Gumshoe, the Witch, and the Virtual Corpse	Keith Hartman	1999	
The Salt Roads	Nalo Hopkinson	2003	Lesbian major characters
Queen's Shadow, Queen's Peril and Queen's Hope	E. K. Johnston	2019–2022	Bisexual major character
The Wild Swans	Peg Kerr	1999	
Murder of Angels	Caitlin R. Kiernan	2004	
Turnskin	Nicole Kimberling	2008	Gay protagonists
Maximum Light	Nancy Kress	1997	
Swordspoint	Ellen Kushner	1987	Gay protagonists, bisexual characters
Magic's Pawn	Mercedes Lackey	1989	Gay main characters
Magic's Price	Mercedes Lackey	1990	Gay main characters
Magic's Promise	Mercedes Lackey	1990	Gay main characters
Salt Fish Girl	Larissa Lai	2002	Lesbian protagonists
Pantomime (Micah Grey Trilogy)	Laura Lam	2013	intersex protagonist
Carmilla	Sheridan Le Fanu	1872	Lesbian vampire story
The Left Hand of Darkness	Ursula K. Le Guin	1969	Genderqueer main and major characters
The Telling	Ursula K. Le Guin	2000	Lesbian protagonist
Dark Water's Embrace	Stephen Leigh	1998	
Ash	Malinda Lo	2009	
Ἀληθῆ διηγήματα	Lucian	125–180 CE (c)	All-male world, male hero is given the king's son in marriage
Itineraria	Jean de Mandeville (pseudonym)	1357–1371	An Amazon island and an island of the "third sex"
China Mountain Zhang	Maureen F. McHugh	1992	Gay major character
Starfarers	Vonda N. McIntyre	1989	Bisexual main characters, poly relationship
Gideon the Ninth	Tamsyn Muir	2019	Lesbian main characters
The Painter Knight	Fiona Patton	1998	
Witchmark	C. L. Polk	2018	Gay main characters
2312	Kim Stanley Robinson	2012	Genderqueer major characters, society in which nonbinary and fluid gender and sexuality is embraced
And Chaos Died	Joanna Russ	1970	Gay protagonist
The Female Man	Joanna Russ	1975	Lesbian major characters, partially about an all-female world
Was	Geoff Ryman	1992	Gay main characters
Burning Bright	Melissa Scott	1993	Bisexual major characters, lesbian protagonist
A Choice of Destinies	Melissa Scott	1986	Gay male protagonists
Dreamships	Melissa Scott	1993	Many gay characters
The Jazz	Melissa Scott	2000	Bisexual protagonist
Mighty Good Road	Melissa Scott	1990	Lesbian protagonist
Night Sky Mine	Melissa Scott	1996	Lesbian and gay main characters
Shadow Man	Melissa Scott	1995	
Trouble and Her Friends	Melissa Scott	1994	Lesbian protagonists
Sword of the Guardian	Merry Shannon	2006	Lesbian fantasy romance with crossdressing protagonist
The Porcelain Dove	Delia Sherman	1993	Lesbian fairy tale
Grasshopper Jungle	Andrew A. Smith	2015	Gay and questioning main characters
Glasshouse	Charles Stross	2006	Posthuman world in which consciousness can be put into other bodies
Venus Plus X	Theodore Sturgeon	1960	Set in a future utopia where everyone is one neuter gender
Hollow World	Michael J. Sullivan	2014	Homogenous world lacking genders where a man from the ancient past has to come to grips with the difference between love and sexual attraction
Queen of the Amazons	Judith Tarr	2004	Bisexual protagonist
Houston, Houston, Do You Read?	James Tiptree Jr.	1976	Set in a future where all men have died off
Palimpsest	Catherynne M. Valente	2009	
The House at Pelham Falls	Brenda Weathers	1986	Lesbian protagonists and main characters
Star Wars: Aftermath	Chuck Wendig	2015–2017	Bisexual female antagonist
All the White Spaces	Ally Wilkes	2022	A trans man protagonist
Where the Dead Wait	Ally Wilkes	2023	A closet gay man protagonist
Orlando: A Biography	Virginia Woolf	1928	Genderqueer themes, gender-switching
Briar Rose	Jane Yolen	1992	Gay major character
The Splinter in the Sky	Kemi Ashing-Giwa	2023	Lesbian main character, lesbian love interest, gay nonbinary major character
The King Must Die	Kemi Ashing-Giwa	2025	Lesbian and trans man main characters, supporting characters are predominately queer

== Short fiction with LGBT characters and themes ==
Title	Author	Year	First published in	LGBT content
"Desire"	Kim Antieau	1997	Bending the Landscape: Fantasy	
"The Stars Are Tears"	Robin Wayne Bailey	1997	Bending the Landscape: Fantasy	
"Love's Last Farewell"	Richard A. Bamberg	1998	Bending the Landscape: Science Fiction	
"In Memory Of"	Don Bassingthwaite	1997	Bending the Landscape: Fantasy	
"Who Plays With Sin"	Don Bassingthwaite	1998	Bending the Landscape: Science Fiction	
"Sun-Drenched"	Stephen Baxter	1998	Bending the Landscape: Science Fiction	
"Tangents"	Greg Bear	1986	Omni	Gay male protagonist, positive uplifting story about a nonsexual relationship
"Magicked Tricks"	K. L. Berac	1997	Bending the Landscape: Fantasy	
"In the House of the Man in the Moon"	Richard Bowes	1997	Bending the Landscape: Fantasy	
"Anthem"	Lela E. Buis	1997; 2014	Sex Crime; Competitive Fauna	Lesbian protagonist
"Ascension"	Lela E. Buis	1997; 2013	Icarus & Angels; Storm and Shadow	Gay protagonist
"The Dress"	Lela E. Buis	2016	Canines	Lesbian protagonist
"Enigma Variations"	Lela E. Buis	1996; 2014	Cyber-magick: Lesbian SF; Competitive Fauna	Lesbian protagonist
"My Little Town"	Lela E. Buis	2014	Competitive Fauna	Lesbian protagonist
"That December"	Lela E. Buis	2015	Young Love, Old Hearts	Lesbian protagonist
"A Study of Competitive Fauna"	Lela E. Buis	2014	Competitive Fauna	Lesbian protagonist
"Expression of Desire"	Dominick Cancilla	1997	Bending the Landscape: Fantasy	
The Bane Chronicles	Cassandra Clare, Maureen Johnson and Sarah Rees Brennan	2013–2014	Short e-books	Main character is bisexual
"Aye, and Gomorrah"	Samuel R. Delany	1967	Dangerous Visions	Genderqueer characters
"The Cage"	A. M. Dellamonica	2010	Tor.com	Lesbian protagonists
"A Plant (Whose Name is Destroyed)"	Seth Dickinson	2013	Strange Horizons	Gay protagonists
"Dance at the Edge"	L. Timmel Duchamp	1998	Bending the Landscape: Science Fiction	
"A Hollow Play"	Amal El-Mohtar	2013	Glitter & Mayhem Anthology	Lesbian protagonist, transgender and genderqueer characters
"Catman"	Harlan Ellison	1974	Final Stage: The Ultimate Science Fiction Anthology	Society where bisexuality is the norm; most characters are gay or bisexual
"Eye of the Storm"	Kelley Eskridge	1998	Sirens and Other Daemon Lovers	
"Frost Painting"	Carolyn Ives Gilman	1997	Bending the Landscape: Fantasy	
"It Takes Two"	Nicola Griffith	2010	Eclipse Three	Lesbian protagonist
"Free in Asveroth"	Jim Grimsley	1998	Bending the Landscape: Science Fiction	
"Miss Ogilvy Finds Herself"	Radclyffe Hall	1934		Lesbian protagonist, gender-switching themes
"Sex, Guns, and Baptists"	Keith Hartman	1998	Bending the Landscape: Science Fiction	
"Lonely Land"	Denise Lopes Heald	1998	Bending the Landscape: Science Fiction	
"-All You Zombies-"	Robert A. Heinlein	1959	Fantasy and Science Fiction	Intersex protagonist
"Fisherman"	Nalo Hopkinson	2001	Skin Folk	
"In Mysterious Ways"	Tanya Huff	1997	Bending the Landscape: Fantasy	
"Cloudmaker"	Charlee Jacob	1997	Bending the Landscape: Fantasy	
"The Rendez-Vous"	Nancy Johnston	1998	Bending the Landscape: Science Fiction	
"Sex with Ghosts"	Sarah Kanning	2008	Strange Horizons	
"Full Moon and Empty Arms"	M. W. Keiper	1997	Bending the Landscape: Fantasy	
"Galapagos"	Caitlin R. Kiernan	2009	Eclipse Three	Lesbian main characters
"Time Gypsy"	Ellen Klages	1998	Bending the Landscape: Science Fiction	Lesbian protagonist
"State of Nature"	Nancy Kress	1998	Bending the Landscape: Science Fiction	
"A Wild and Wicked Youth"	Ellen Kushner	2009	Fantasy and Science Fiction	
"The Fall of the Kings"	Ellen Kushner and Delia Sherman	1997	Bending the Landscape: Fantasy	
"Nine Lives"	Ursula K. Le Guin	1969	Playboy	Bisexual protagonists
"A Real Girl"	Shariann Lewitt	1998	Bending the Landscape: Science Fiction	
"Water Snakes"	Holly Wade Matter	1997	Bending the Landscape: Fantasy	
"Sea of Cortez"	Sandra McDonald	2011	Take Me There: Trans and Genderqueer Erotica	
"Useless Things"	Maureen F. McHugh	2009	Eclipse Three	
"Bridesicle"	Will McIntosh	2010	Asimov's Science Fiction	Lesbian protagonist
"Looking for Satan"	Vonda N. McIntyre	1981	Thieves' World III	Lesbian/bisexual love story
"Powertool"	Mark McLaughlin	1998	Bending the Landscape: Science Fiction	
"Prince of the Dark Green Sea"	Mark McLaughlin	1997	Bending the Landscape: Fantasy	
"Three Letters from the Queen of Elfland"	Sarah Monette	2002	Lady Churchill's Rosebud Wristlet	
"The King's Folly"	James A. Moore	1997	Bending the Landscape: Fantasy	
"Silent Passion"	Kathleen O'Malley	1998	Bending the Landscape: Science Fiction	
"Half in Love with Easeful Rock and Roll"	Rebecca Ore	1998	Bending the Landscape: Science Fiction	
"The Beautiful People"	Wendy Rathbone	1998	Bending the Landscape: Science Fiction	
"The City in Morning"	Carrie Richerson	1998	Bending the Landscape: Science Fiction	
"Proserpine When It Sizzles"	Tansy Rayner Roberts	2009	New Ceres Nights	
"Existence"	Joanna Russ	1975	Epoch	
"Nobody's Home"	Joanna Russ	1972	Women of Wonder	
"The Second Inquisition"	Joanna Russ	1970	More Women of Wonder	
"When It Changed"	Joanna Russ	1972	Again, Dangerous Visions	Lesbian protagonist
"Young Lady Who Loved Caterpillars"	Jessica Amanda Salmonson	1997	Bending the Landscape: Fantasy	
"Selected Program Notes from the Retrospective Exhibition of Theresa Rosenberg Latimer"	Kenneth Schneyer	2013	Clockwork Phoenix 4	Lesbian protagonist
"Brooks Too Broad for Leaping"	Charles Sheffield	1998	Bending the Landscape: Science Fiction	
"Gary, in the Shadows"	Mark Shepherd	1997	Bending the Landscape: Fantasy	
"There Are Things Which Are Hidden from the Eyes of the Everyday"	Simon Sheppard	1997	Bending the Landscape: Fantasy	
"The Faerie Cony-Catcher"	Delia Sherman	1998	Sirens and Other Daemon Lovers	
"The Sound of Angels"	Lisa S. Silverthorne	1997	Bending the Landscape : Fantasy	
"On Vacation"	Ralph A. Sperry	1998	Bending the Landscape: Science Fiction	
"The Flying Triangle"	Allen Steele	1998	Bending the Landscape: Science Fiction	
"The World Well Lost"	Theodore Sturgeon	1953	Universe	
"Another Coming"	Sonya Taaffe	2004	Not One of Us	
"The Home Town Boy"	B. J. Thrower	1997	Bending the Landscape: Fantasy	
"The Night Train"	Lavie Tidhar	2010	Strange Horizons	Trans protagonist
"Gestures Too Late on a Gravel Road"	Mark W. Tiedemann	1997	Bending the Landscape: Fantasy	
"Surfaces"	Mark W. Tiedemann	1998	Bending the Landscape: Science Fiction	
"Your Faces, O My Sisters! Your Faces Filled with Light"	James Tiptree Jr.	1976	Aurora: Beyond Equality	Woman from an all-female society is the protagonist.
"Mahu"	Jeff Verona	1997	Bending the Landscape: Fantasy	
"… Suspends ton vol"	Élisabeth Vonarburg	1992	Translated as "Stay Thy Flight" in Bending the Landscape: Science Fiction	
"Beside the Well"	Leslie What	1997	Bending the Landscape: Fantasy	
"The Metamorphosis Bud"	Liu Wen Zhuang (pen name of Cynthea Liu)	1996	Genderflex	
"Small Changes Over Long Periods of Time"	K. M. Szpara	2017	Uncanny Magazine	trans protagonist
"Fruiting Bodies"	Kemi Ashing-Giwa	2022	Reactor Magazine	lesbian protagonist, her wife
"The Sufficient Loss Protocol"	Kemi Ashing-Giwa	2022	Reactor Magazine	lesbian protagonist
"The Puppetmaster"	Kemi Ashing-Giwa	2023	Reactor Magazine	lesbian protagonist, queer love interest
"You Don't Belong Where You Don't Belong"	Kemi Ashing-Giwa	2024	Reactor Magazine	queer protagonist and love interest

== Anthologies ==
Title	Editors	Year	Publisher
Bending the Landscape: Fantasy	Nicola Griffith and Stephen Pagel	1997	White Wolf Publishing
Bending the Landscape: Horror	Nicola Griffith and Stephen Pagel	2001	White Wolf Publishing
Bending the Landscape: Science Fiction	Nicola Griffith and Stephen Pagel	1998	White Wolf Publishing
Beyond Binary: Genderqueer and Sexually Fluid Speculative Fiction	Lee Mandelo	2013	Lethe Press
Brothers of the Night: Gay Vampire Stories	Michael Rowe and Thomas S. Roche	1997	Cleis Press
Cyber-magick: Lesbian SF	Gary Bowen	1996	Obeliesk Books
Flying Cups & Saucers: Gender Explorations in Science Fiction & Fantasy	Debbie Notkin and the Secret Feminist Cabal	1998	Edgewood Press
Gay City 5: Ghosts in Gaslight, Monsters in Steam	Vincent Kovar and Evan J. Peterson	2013	Minor Arcana Press and Gay City Health Project
Grave Passions: Tales of the Gay Supernatural	William J. Mann	1997	Badboy
Icarus & Angels, Flights of Fantasy: Gay SF	Gary Bowen	1996	Obeliesk Books
Irregulars: A Shared-World Anthology – Stories by Nicole Kimberling, Josh Lanyon, Astrid Amara and Ginn Hale. LGBT Fantasy	Nicole Kimberling and J.D. Hope	2012	Blind Eye Books
Kindred Spirits: An Anthology of Gay and Lesbian Science Fiction Stories	Jeffrey M. Elliot	1984	Alyson
Queer Dimensions	James EM Rasmussen	2009	Queered Fiction
Suffered from the Night: Queering Stoker's Dracula	Steve Berman	2013	Lethe Press
Swords of the Rainbow: Science Fiction and Fantasy	Eric Garber and Jewelle Gomez	1996	Alyson
Tangle Anthology, XY Edition. Fiction with a Twist.	Nicole Kimberling	2008	Blind Eye Books
Tangle Girls Anthology. Fiction with a Twist.	Nicole Kimberling	2009	Blind Eye Books
Things Invisible to See: Gay and Lesbian Tales of Magic Realism	Lawrence Schimel	1998	Circlet Press
Time Well Bent: Queer Alternative Histories	Connie Wilkins	2009	Lethe Press
Touch of the Sea	Steve Berman	2012	Lethe Press
Worlds Apart: An Anthology of Lesbian and Gay Science Fiction and Fantasy	Camilla Decarnin, Eric Garber, and Lyn Paleo	1986	Alyson

== Awards ==
- Gaylactic Spectrum Awards
- James Tiptree, Jr. Award
- Lambda Literary Awards

== See also ==
- Sex and sexuality in speculative fiction
- Gender in speculative fiction
- Queer horror
- LGBT literature
- Lists of gay, lesbian, or bisexual figures in fiction
- List of LGBT figures in mythology
