= Bending the Landscape =

Series of LGBT-themed fiction anthologies

Bending the Landscape is the title of a series of LGBT-themed anthologies of short speculative fiction edited by Nicola Griffith and Stephen Pagel. Three books were produced between 1997 and 2001, subtitled Science Fiction, Fantasy, and Horror. Each volume won LGBT or genre awards.

== Themes ==
The editors asked contributors to "imagine a different landscape... some milieu that had not happened" and then address the theme of Alien or Other, with the Other being a lesbian or gay man. However the stories were not specifically aimed at a gay readership. Mark R. Kelly's review in locus magazine bemoaned the anthologies lack of thematic breadth.

== Awards ==
The series received awards including a World Fantasy Award, two Lambda Literary Awards, and two Gaylactic Spectrum Awards. Some individual stories contained within were also recipients of awards and nominations.

== Bending the Landscape: Fantasy ==
Cover of Bending the Landscape: Fantasy, art by Kevin Murphy.

Published in 1997.

=== Awards ===
- Lambda Literary Award, Lesbian and Gay Science Fiction, Fantasy & Horror
- World Fantasy Award, Best Anthology

=== Contents ===
- Frost Painting – novelette by Carolyn Ives Gilman
- Gary, in the Shadows – shortstory by Mark Shepherd
- Prince of the Dark Green Sea – shortstory by Mark McLaughlin
- Water Snakes – shortstory by Holly Wade Matter
- Gestures Too Late on a Gravel Road – shortstory by Mark W. Tiedemann
- The Fall of the Kings (The World of Riverside) – novelette by Ellen Kushner and Delia Sherman
- Cloudmaker – shortstory by Charlee Jacob
- Magicked Tricks – novelette by K. L. Berac
- The Sound of Angels – shortstory by Lisa S. Silverthorne
- The King's Folly – shortstory by James A. Moore
- Beside the Well – shortstory by Leslie What
- The Home Town Boy – shortstory by B. J. Thrower
- Expression of Desire – shortstory by Dominick Cancilla
- There Are Things Which Are Hidden from the Eyes of the Everyday – shortstory by Simon Sheppard
- Full Moon and Empty Arms – shortstory by M. W. Keiper
- Mahu – novelette by Jeff Verona
- The Stars Are Tears – shortstory by Robin Wayne Bailey
- Desire – shortstory by Kim Antieau
- Young Lady Who Loved Caterpillars – shortstory by Jessica Amanda Salmonson
- In Memory of – shortstory by Don Bassingthwaite
- In Mysterious Ways – novelette by Tanya Huff
- In the House of the Man in the Moon – shortstory by Richard Bowes

== Bending the Landscape: Science Fiction ==
Cover of Bending the Landscape: Science Fiction, art by J K Potter.

Published in 1998.

=== Awards ===
- Lambda Literary Award, Lesbian and Gay Science Fiction, Fantasy & Horror
- Gaylactic Spectrum Award
- Stonewall Book Award: Literature (finalist)

=== Contents ===
- Sex, Guns, and Baptists – shortstory by Keith Hartman
- Half in Love With Easeful Rock and Roll – shortfiction by Rebecca Ore
- Powertool – shortfiction by Mark McLaughlin
- Time Gypsy – novelette by Ellen Klages
- Lonely Land – shortfiction by Denise Lopes Heald
- The Rendez-Vous – shortfiction by Nancy Johnston
- Silent Passion – shortfiction by Kathleen O'Malley
- Sun-Drenched – shortfiction by Stephen Baxter
- The Flying Triangle – [Near Space] – shortfiction by Allen Steele
- Brooks Too Broad For Leaping – shortstory by Charles Sheffield
- A Real Girl – shortfiction by Shariann Lewitt
- Dance at the Edge – novelette by L. Timmel Duchamp
- Love's Last Farewell – shortfiction by Richard A. Bamberg
- On Vacation – shortfiction by Ralph A. Sperry
- The City in Morning – shortstory by Carrie Richerson
- State of Nature – shortstory by Nancy Kress
- The Beautiful People – shortfiction by Wendy Rathbone
- Who Plays With Sin – shortfiction by Don Bassingthwaite
- Surfaces – shortfiction by Mark W. Tiedemann
- Stay Thy Flight – shortfiction by Élisabeth Vonarburg
- Free in Asveroth – shortstory by Jim Grimsley

== Bending the Landscape: Horror ==
Cover of Bending the Landscape: Horror, art by J K Potter.

Published in 2001.

=== Awards ===
- Gaylactic Spectrum Award

=== Contents ===
- Coyote Love – shortstory by Kraig Blackwelder
- Explanations Are Clear – novelette by L. Timmel Duchamp
- What Are You Afraid Of? – shortstory by Simon Sheppard
- The Lost Homeland – novelette by Cynthia Ward
- The Man Who Picks the Chamomile – shortstory by Mark McLaughlin
- Love on a Stick – novelette by Carrie Richerson
- Triangle – shortstory by Ellen Klages
- Memorabilia – novelette by Holly Wade Matter
- Blood Requiem – shortstory by Gary Bowen
- In the Days Still Left – novelette by Brian A. Hopkins and James Van Pelt
- Broken Canes – shortstory by Alexi Smart
- Keep the Faith – shortstory by A. J. Potter
- The WereSlut of Avenue A – shortstory by Leslie What
- Kindred – novelette by Alexis Glynn Latner
- 'Til Death – shortstory by Barbara Hambly
- If I Could See Lazarus Rising – novelette by Kathleen O'Malley
- The Waltz of the Epileptic Penguins – shortstory by Keith Hartman
- Passing – novelette by Mark W. Tiedemann

== See also ==
- Homosexuality in speculative fiction
- List of LGBT-themed speculative fiction
