= Where the Dead Wait =

2023 novel by Ally Wilkes

- First edition cover
- Author: Ally Wilkes
- Language: English
- Genres: Horror; Supernatural; Historical
- Publisher: Atria Books
- Publication date: 5 December 2023
- Publication place: United Kingdom
- Media type: Hardcover
- Pages: 400
- ISBN: 978-1-982182-82-3

Where the Dead Wait is a 2023 historical, horror and supernatural novel by English writer Ally Wilkes. It is her second novel and was first published in the United Kingdom in December 2023 by Atria Books, a division of Simon & Schuster. The book's working title was What Passes Through.

Where the Dead Wait is a polar exploration book set in nineteenth-century Arctic. It is her second polar exploration story, the first being her debut novel, All the White Spaces (2022), which was set in early twentieth-century Antarctica.

== Plot summary ==
Where the Dead Wait alternates between two timelines set in the Arctic Ocean. The first takes place in 1869 where William Day is an officer aboard The Reckoning, a ship searching for a Northwest Passage through the Arctic icepack. When the captain dies from scurvy, Day is forced to take command of the ship. After The Reckoning becomes trapped in the ice and food supplies run out, starvation sets in and the crew start dying. Day, with the backing of his second in command, Jesse Stevens, makes the desperate decision to resort to cannibalism to stay alive. Later, Day, Stevens and some of the other crew, are rescued, but back in London Day is disgraced for losing his ship and sanctioning cannibalism. The British press publish cartoons of Day with the caption "Eat-Em-Fresh Day".

The second timeline takes place in 1882 when Day is instructed by British Admiralty to captain The Resolution and find Stevens. Stevens had set out on another ship to return to the Arctic to locate the Northwest Passage, but had never returned. Day learns that Stevens's wife, Olive, a psychic, had requested the rescue and will be aboard the ship as a passenger to help locate her husband. Day has misgivings about returning to the place he has nightmares about. He also obsesses about Stevens, who Day is secretly in love with. After Olive begins holding séances on the ship to locate the dead, Day begins seeing apparitions of Stevens.

== Background ==
Wilkes said she has always been captivated by the early polar explorations. "[T]here’s just something about the thrilling tales of survival—and hubris—in the days when you could literally travel 'off the edge of the map'." While working on her previous novel, All the White Spaces, which is set in the Antarctica, she discovered that she also wanted to write a companion novel set in the Arctic.

Wilkes began writing What Passes Through in 2019, about three years before All the White Spaces was published. In July 2022, and after several rewrites, What Passes Through was ready for publication, but not before changing the title to Where the Dead Wait. Wilkes and her publisher "realized that the book’s original title just didn’t quite work. It was too oblique, and didn’t really capture the reader’s interest."

Where the Dead Wait deals with, amongst other things, the impact colonialism had on the Arctic and its indigenous inhabitants. Wilkes explained that she worked with a sensitivity reader specializing in historical Inuit-European relations, but added, "while recognizing my own privilege and position as a white British author, I hope I’ve done my best to shine a small light on these areas, too."

== Critical reception ==
A starred review in Publishers Weekly described Where the Dead Wait as "a breathtaking achievement." The reviewer complimented Wilkes on her handling of the book's two timelines, and said she "crafts rich physical and psychological landscapes that deepen her terrifying tale as it barrels toward an unforgettable crescendo. Becky Spratford wrote in Library Journal that Where the Dead Wait's plot develops slowly, and is full of detailed descriptions of the ships, the characters, and the frozen landscapes. She stated that this narrative "mimics both the plight of the crew and the obsession which anchors the terror." Spratford said the book's "intense psychological horror and isolation" will appeal to readers of Alma Katsu's horror novels, and S. A. Barnes's Dead Silence.

Kirkus Reviews had reservations about Where the Dead Wait. It stated that despite its good start, "with raw, energetic prose and a sense of adventure undercut by dread that’s downright thrilling", after not too long, the plot becomes "repetiti[ve]". The reviewer complained that the narrative "turns from chilling to numbing", and the finale's horror "is no longer surprising". In a review of Where the Dead Wait in the New York Journal of Books, John Slayton stated that while the book's premise is "promising", "the overall execution is wanting". He said the story's two timelines "are expertly woven", but the plot "is too thin" and "repetitive", and most of the characters remain underdeveloped. Slayton felt that Day spends "too much time" agonising over his past and obsessing over Stevens, and the story relies too much on the horrors of cannibalism.

== See also ==
- List of LGBT-themed speculative fiction
- List of LGBT characters in modern written fiction
