= Space horror =

Genre of fiction

If you meant Cosmic horror, see Lovecraftian horror

Space horror is a subgenre of horror fiction generally defined as space-based horror.

While pure outer space horror films may solely include films taking place in spacecraft, space stations or outer space, the broader blend of settings covered by the subgenre of space horror include locations on exoplanets and exomoons, within the Solar System but not on Earth, and terrestrial films set on Earth (alien invasion films). Films belonging to the subgenre of space horror typically feature an alien antagonist.

Variety's Jenelle Riley cited the following titles as standout space horror films: Life (2017), Dead Space: Downfall (2008), Solaris (1972), Lifeforce (1985), It! The Terror from Beyond Space (1958), Sunshine (2007), Pitch Black (2000), Event Horizon (1997), Alien (1979), and Aliens (1986).

An innovative feature that can be found in some films blending a space setting and horror is an altered topology of time.

== Characteristics ==
Space horror is a subgenre of horror fiction typically set in space, away from human society and its constraints. While it occasionally takes place on Earth, such as in the case of alien invasion films, the subgenre focuses mostly on works taking place in spacecraft, space stations, other planets or outer space.

Common elements are a small set of characters, a high body count, a military component, aliens and the exploration of various themes such as isolation, the darkness of the human mind, existential dread or an altered topology of time.

== History ==
While space exploration has been a point of interest for a long time, with works such as David Russen’s Iter Lunare: Or, A Voyage to the Moon (1703) imagining interplanetary voyage, it was not until 1898 and H. G. Wells’s The War of the Worlds that alien invasion became a feature of science fiction stories, introducing the idea of extraterrestrial threats. Later works such as Georges Méliès’s A Trip to the Moon (1902) developed the idea of space as a dangerous place, linking together space exploration and horror.

The Cold War led to the development of science fiction, the genre providing an outlet for the fears and anxieties of the moment, representing hostile aliens and mass destruction as allegories for the threats of the war.

Interest in space horror diminished throughout the years, until 1979, with the release of the film Alien by Ridley Scott. Mixing science fiction, horror and supernatural, it popularized space horror, with the story of an alien attacking the crew members of a spaceship. Since then, space horror has been used in various movies, video games and novels.

== Films ==
Alien (1979) is considered one of the most influential movies in the space horror subgenre, although there had been similar films made before, such as It! The Terror from Beyond Space (1958), which inspired Alien itself, Planet of the Vampires (1965) or Queen of Blood (1966).

Alien was succeeded by its own sequel Alien franchise, as well as movies such as Event Horizon (1997), Sunshine (2007) or Life (2017).

Other examples of the genre are Solaris (1972), Pitch Black (2000), Pandorum (2009), Apollo 18 (2011), Europa Report (2013) and The Cloverfield Paradox (2018).

== Video games ==
Various video games feature space horror themes and plots, such as Doom, Dead Space, Alien: Isolation (2014), Prey (2017), Observation (2019), Moons of Madness (2019), Signalis (2022), The Callisto Protocol (2022), Lethal Company (2023) and System Shock (2023).

== Literature ==
Examples of space horror books are Richard Paul Russo’s Ship of Fools (2001), Brian Evenson’s Dead Space: Martyr (2010), Brett J. Talley's The Void (2012), Iain Rob Wright's 2389 (2015), Darcy Coates’s Parasite (2016), Stacey Kade’s Dead Silence (2022) and Ghost Station (2024) and David Wellington’s Paradise-1 (2023).

== See also ==
- Lovecraftian horror
