= Ghost station (disambiguation) =

The term ghost station refers to closed or never opened train station through which revenue-service passenger trains (especially rapid transit trains) pass but at which they do not stop.

It may also refer to:

- Ghost Stations, a series of books by Bruce Barrymore Halpenny
- Ghost Station (film), a 2007 Thai film
- Ghost Station (novel), a 2024 horror novel by Stacey Kade under the penname S. A. Barnes
- Ghost stations of the Paris Metro

== See also ==
- Ghost train
