= Social criticism =

Form of interpreting and sorting issues in contemporary society

Social criticism is a form of academic or journalistic criticism focusing on social issues in contemporary society, in respect to perceived injustices and power relations in general.

== History ==
Five fragments of text produced by the ancient Greek philosopher Xenophanes (c. 570 – c. 478 BCE) cover aspects of social criticism, including comments on the adulation directed to leading sport players and advice on living a life of moderation. These fragments have been seen as anticipating some of the later writings of Plato in his Republic.

The origins of modern social criticism date back at least to the Age of Enlightenment. According to the historian Jonathan Israel the roots of the radical enlightenment can be found in Spinoza and his circle.

The positivism dispute between critical rationalism and the Frankfurt School, dealt with the question of whether research in the social sciences should be "neutral" or consciously adopt a partisan view. Academic works of social criticism can belong to social philosophy, political economy, sociology, social psychology, psychoanalysis but also cultural studies and other disciplines or reject academic forms of discourse.

== In literature ==
Social criticism can be expressed in a fictional form, e.g. in a revolutionary novel like The Iron Heel (1908) by Jack London, in dystopian novels like Aldous Huxley's Brave New World (1932), George Orwell's Nineteen Eighty-Four (1949), Ray Bradbury's Fahrenheit 451 (1953), and Rafael Grugman's Nontraditional Love (2008), or in children's books or films. According to Frederick Douglass, "Where justice is denied, where poverty is enforced, where ignorance prevails, and where any one class is made to feel that society is an organized conspiracy to oppress, rob and degrade them, neither persons nor property will be safe."

=== Classical writings ===
- Étienne de La Boétie: Discourse on Voluntary Servitude (circa 1560)
- Baruch de Spinoza: Tractatus Theologico-Politicus, 1670
- Immanuel Kant: What Is Enlightenment? 1784
- Mary Wollstonecraft: A Vindication of the Rights of Woman 1792
- Karl Marx: Das Kapital. 1867
- Mikhail Bakunin: Statism and Anarchy 1873
- Friedrich Nietzsche: Untimely Meditations. (1873–1876)
- Upton Sinclair: The Jungle. 1906
- Walter Benjamin: Zur Kritik der Gewalt. In: Archiv für Sozialwissenschaften und Sozialpolitik, 1921, engl. Toward the Critique of Violence: A Critical Edition, Stanford University Press 2021
- Georg Lukács: History and Class Consciousness. 1923
- Virginia Woolf: A Room of One's Own. 1929
- Sigmund Freud: Civilization and Its Discontents. 1930
- Max Horkheimer: Traditional and Critical Theory (1937)
- Norbert Elias: Über den Prozeß der Zivilisation. 1939, engl The Civilizing Process
- Friedrich August von Hayek: The Road to Serfdom. 1944
- Max Horkheimer, Theodor W. Adorno: Dialektik der Aufklärung. 1947, engl. Dialectic of Enlightenment
- Simone de Beauvoir: Le Deuxième Sexe, 1949, engl. The Second Sex.
- Aimé Césaire: Discours sur le colonialisme (1950), engl. Discourse on Colonialism
- Ernst Bloch: Das Prinzip Hoffnung (1938 bis 1947), engl. The Principle of Hope
- Erich Fromm: The art of loving. 1956
- Milovan Đilas: The New Class: An Analysis of the Communist System 1957
- Friedrich August von Hayek: The Constitution of Liberty. 1960
- Frantz Fanon: Les damnés de la terre, engl. The Wretched of the Earth
- Rachel Carson: Silent Spring (1962)
- Herbert Marcuse: One-Dimensional Man (1964)
- Guy Debord: La Société du spectacle (1967), engl. The Society of the Spectacle
- Louis Althusser: Idéologie et appareils idéologiques d’État, published in La Pensée, no 151, June 1970, engl. Ideology and Ideological State Apparatuses
- Michel Foucault: Surveiller et punir: Naissance de la prison (1975), engl. Discipline and Punish
- Michel Foucault: La volonté de savoir, engl. vol. 1 of The History of Sexuality
- Cornelius Castoriadis: L'Institution imaginaire de la société (1975), engl. Imaginary Institution of Society: Creativity and Autonomy in the Social–historical World, London: Polity, 1997 (new edition)
- Pierre Bourdieu: La distinction: Critique sociale du jugement (1979), engl. Distinction: A Social Critique of the Judgement of Taste

=== Important contemporary works ===
- Audre Lorde: Sister Outsider, 1984
- Michel Henry: La barbarie. Bernard Grasset, Paris 1987,engl. Barbarism, Continuum 2012
- Gayatri Chakravorty Spivak: Can the Subaltern Speak? in: Cary Nelson & Lawrence Grossberg (Hgg.): Marxism and the Interpretation of Culture, University of Illinois Press, Chicago 1988,
- Judith Butler: Gender Trouble. 1989
- Monique Wittig: The Straight Mind and other Essays, 1992
- Raewyn Connell: Masculinities. 1995
- Richard Sennett: The corrosion of character. The Personal Consequences Of Work In the New Capitalism. 1998
- Noam Chomsky: Manufacturing Consent. 1988. Profit over People. 2000
- Gilbert Rist: Le développement, Histoire d’une croyance occidentale. Presses de Sciences Po, Paris 1996 – engl. The History of Development: From Western Origins to Global Faith. Zed Books, London 2003
- Arno Gruen: The Insanity of Normality: Understanding Human Destructiveness. Human Development Books, Berkeley 2007
- Kate Crawford: Atlas of AI. Power, Politics, and the Planetary Costs of Artificial Intelligence, Yale University Press, New Haven, London 2021
- Todd McGowan: The Racist Fantasy. Unconscious Roots of Hatred. Bloomsbury Academic, New York etc. 2022

== In music ==
Social criticism is present in opera (e.g. The Cradle Will Rock or Trouble in Tahiti) and other types of classical music, such as the Symphony No.13, called "Babi Yar", of Dmitri Shostakovich. Musical expressions of social criticism are also found in rock and rap music, with examples that include "God Save the Queen" by the Sex Pistols and "Brenda's Got a Baby" by 2Pac.

== See also ==
- Cancel culture – Modern form of social rejection
- Critical Legal Studies – School of critical theory developed in the US
- Critical Race Theory – Conceptual framework
- Critique of political economy – Social critique
- Cultural critic – Professional who reasonably judges the norms and behaviors of a society
- Social commentary – Act of offering one's views on people bound by culture, through rhetoric
- Social theory – Framework used to study social phenomena
