= Sei Alalak Bridge =

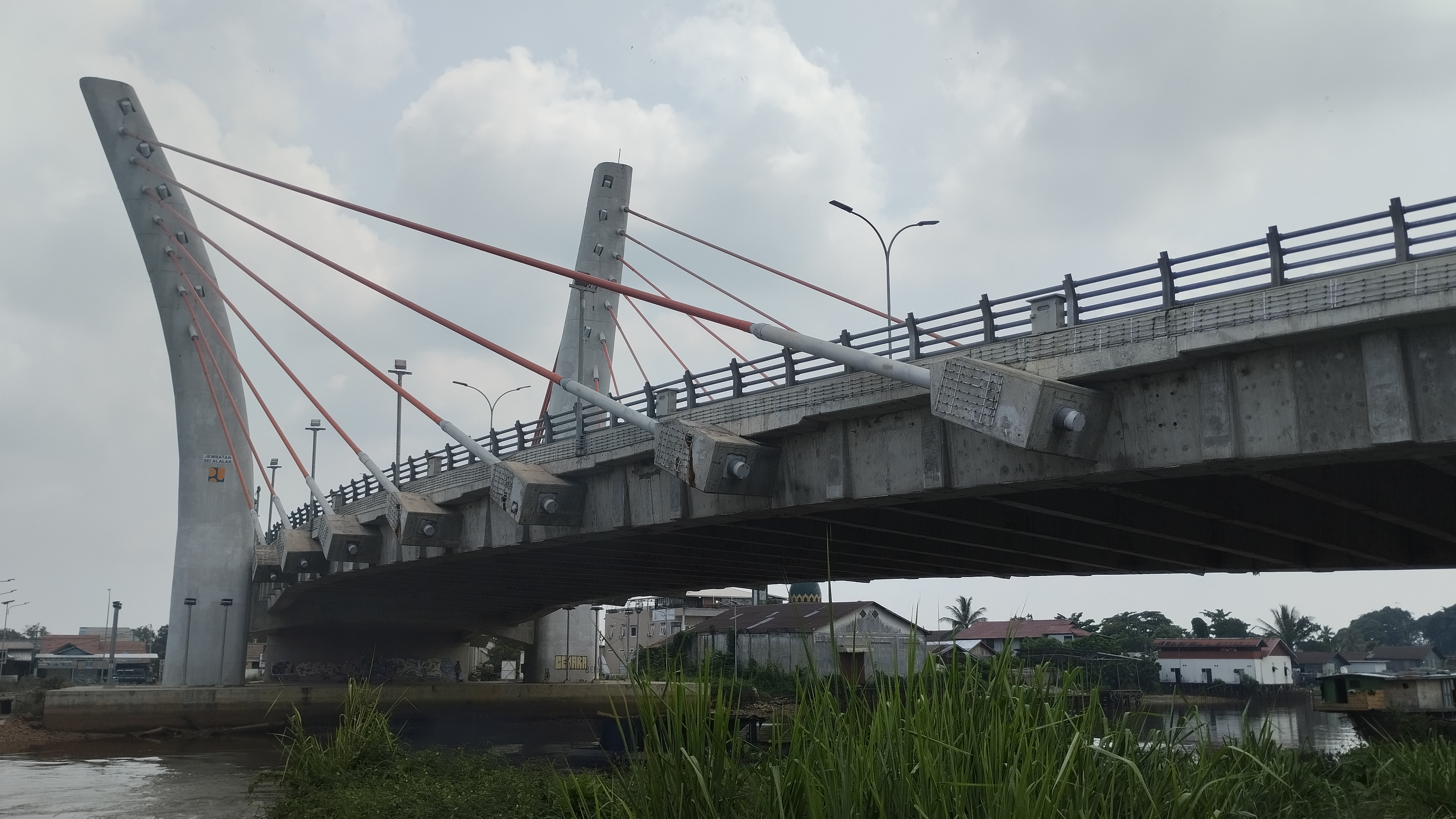
- Sei Alalak Bridge from below
- Coordinates: 3.2772°S 114.5897°E
- Carries: Wheeled vehicles
- Crosses: Alalak River
- Locale: Barito Kuala Regency, South Kalimantan

Characteristics
- Design: cable-stayed bridge
- Total length: 850 metres (2,789 ft)
- Width: 20 metres (66 ft)
- No. of lanes: 4

History
- Constructed by: PT. Wijaya Karya; PT. Pandji

Location
- Interactive map of Sei Alalak Bridge

Sei Alalak Bridge is a curved cable-stayed bridge in South Kalimantan province of Indonesia. The bridge, which has length of 850 meters, crossing the Alalak river in Alalak District, Barito Kuala Regency, and connecting the regency through the main Trans-Kalimantan Road towards Banjarmasin city.

== History ==
Prior to the bridge construction, the river crossing was mainly done through Kayutangi I Bridge and Kayutangi II Bridge. The old bridges were considered too small to accommodate the increasing traffic on the road, especially due to the fact the road is an important route connecting South Kalimantan and East Kalimantan provinces in the eastern coast to Central Kalimantan province and is a point of entry to Banjarmasin. Sei Alalak Bridge was built to replace the Kayutangi I Bridge, while the road traffic would be temporarily diverted to Kayutangi II Bridge. The construction was done jointly by PT. Wijaya Karya and PT. Pandji with Rp 278 billion in cost. The work started in 2018 and finished in late 2020, then later inaugurated by Indonesian president Joko Widodo on 21 October 2021. It is claimed to be the first curved cable-stayed bridge in Indonesia.

=== Basit Bridge meme ===
Prior to its inauguration by the Indonesian president Joko Widodo, the bridge was still closed and not yet open for public use. However, there was a video circulating on the social media where a car was allowed to pass through the closed bridge by the guards after saying "Aku ading Basit" or "I am Basit's younger sister" in Banjarese. It was later revealed that Basit was one of the local worker recruited for the bridge construction. It later became a meme and highlighted the absurdity of the situation, where someone was able to use the bridge even before the president himself. Indonesian social media users, especially for those from South Kalimantan, mockingly named the bridge "Jembatan Basit" or "Basit's Bridge". The name eventually picked up and even used as alternative name of the bridge by several news media and on Google Maps. Indonesian anthropologist from Lambung Mangkurat University stated that the meme was a form of social criticism against violation of the rule of law and public rights.
