= Cold Eternity =

2025 book

- Author: S. A. Barnes
- Audio read by: Amara Jasper
- Language: English
- Publisher: Tor Nightfire
- Publication date: 2025
- Publication place: United States
- Media type: Print (hardback, paperback), ebook, audiobook
- Pages: 304 pages
- ISBN: 1250884950 First edition hardcover
- Preceded by: Ghost Station

Cold Eternity is a 2025 sci-fi horror novel by Stacey Kade, writing under the pen name of S. A. Barnes. Kade has stated that the novel has particular themes of psychological and body horror.

== Synopsis ==
Halley is a political aide on the run from assassins after she discovered that her manager Niina and the Prime Minister of the United Nations of Colonies were involved in a scandal to ensure his reelection. She takes an illegal job aboard the Elysium Fields, a 150-year-old spaceship containing the frozen bodies of the terminally ill. Its founder, Zale Winfield, promised that they would be brought out of stasis once cures were found. As there was no safe way to thaw the bodies and research on cryogenics ceased, the ship was turned into a museum until it suddenly closed, leaving it crewed only by a single ship's mechanic, Karl.

Karl has tasked Halley with pushing a button every three hours so that the ship's board of directors knows that the Elysium has not been abandoned. This leaves her sleep deprived and Halley begins to see a strange creature roaming the ship. She begins to visit the ship's theater, which contains the holograms of Winfield's three children, Bryck, Ianthe, and Aleyk. The holograms are also strange, as they appear to be far more sophisticated than AI would allow. Aleyk breaks free of his programming to warn Halley to leave, which is futile since there is no nearby ship or station for her to flee towards.

Eventually Halley learns the truth of the ship. Over 150 years ago Winfield merged with an alien in the hopes of becoming functionally immortal, unaware that doing so would require him to consume human flesh. Winfield created the ship so that he could have a steady supply of frozen human bodies to eat. His children were forced into a special type of statis that would allow them to communicate with him via holograms, so he wouldn't be alone. As time passed the alien began to desire fresh victims. The museum was opened so Winfield could select single visitors who wouldn't be missed, however it was closed when his mind deteriorated to the point where he could not restrain himself from eating those who would be more easily missed. In order to keep the alien happy Karl brought aboard desperate people who wouldn't be missed, so the creature could hunt at its leisure. Karl went along with everything in the hopes that the alien would transfer itself to his body, even going so far as to feed it parts of his own body. Aleyk had begun communicating with Halley so she could escape and hopefully put a stop to everything.

Terrified, Halley broadcasts her position to the PM's opposition in the hopes of receiving rescue. While she is waiting Halley is attacked by Karl, who is in turn killed by the alien. The alien then tries to use Halley as its host, but is interrupted by the arrival of Niina, who had been monitoring the opposition's messages. The alien takes Niina as its new host. In order to prevent the alien and Niina from leaving the ship, Halley blows the ship up with the help of Aleyk. She is then rescued and returned to civilization, where she brings the truth of the political scandal and Elysium Fields to light. The novel ends with Halley receiving a final message from Aleyk, who had managed to send one out prior to the explosion, thanking her for freeing him and all of the others trapped aboard the ship.

== Development ==
When writing the story, Kade wanted to tell a story that "would involve the lengths people go to extend their lives and what that might look like in the future." She chose to have Halley flee because of a political scandal in order to justify her staying on the ship and because she was influenced by the January 6 Committee hearings. Kade stated that she was particularly struck by the testimony of Cassidy Hutchinson, who she found brave for testifying despite the impact it would have on her career and pressure from the Republican Party to remain silent. Other elements that influenced the novel included the 1986 film Aliens and the character of Ellen Ripley, who Kade admired because "there aren't many women in sci-fi who are not cannon fodder or a love interest." Kade has described the novel as sci-fi horror as well as being strongly psychological and body horror.

== Release ==
Cold Eternity was first published in hardback and e-book formats in the United States through Tor Nightfire on April 8, 2025. An audiobook adaptation narrated by Amara Jasper was released simultaneously through Macmillan Audio. A paperback edition will be released on January 20, 2026, also through Tor Nightfire.

The novel was also released in German in 2025 through Heyne.

== Reception ==
Critical reception for Cold Eternity has been favorable. Shannon Fay of Strange Horizons felt that some elements of the novel were not new, but that overall "the storytelling is solid and the characters fleshed out, and the occasional twist in the maze upends the reader's expectations about just where the story is going." Jim Mcleod of Ginger Nuts of Horror also reviewed Cold Eternity, praising the build up and that the novel centered on a single protagonist.
