= Hachette Books =

Imprint of Perseus Books Group

- Parent company: Perseus Books Group (Hachette)
- Founded: 1990; 36 years ago
- Founder: Michael Eisner; Robert S. Miller
- Country of origin: United States
- Headquarters location: New York City, New York, U.S.
- Key people: Susan Weinberg (SVP and publisher, Perseus Books Group); Mary Ann Naples (vice president and publisher)
- Publication types: Books
- Imprints: Hachette Go; Da Capo Press; Lifelong
- Official website: www.hachettebooks.com

Hachette Books, formerly Hyperion Books, is a general-interest book imprint of the Perseus Books Group, which is a division of Hachette Book Group and ultimately a part of Lagardère Group. Established in 1990, Hachette publishes general-interest fiction and non-fiction books for adults. A former subsidiary of The Walt Disney Company, it was originally named after Hyperion Avenue, the location of Walt Disney Studios prior to 1939. Hachette took over a 1,000 book backlist when Hyperion was purchased from Disney in 2013 with 250 bestselling novels, including Mitch Albom's The Five People You Meet in Heaven.

== History ==
=== Hyperion Books ===
Logo of Hyperion Books, former name of Hachette Books

Hyperion Books was founded in 1990 from scratch with no backlist under Disney's then-C.E.O. Michael Eisner and Robert S. Miller. Hyperion's strategy was to not purchase backlists, but to go after newer or lesser known authors and to "capitalize on Disney talent and products." Hyperion Books for Children (HBC) and Disney Press were also launched in 1990. The Disney Publishing Group was incorporated in January 1992 and included the already formed Hyperion Books, Hyperion Books for Children, Disney Press and other units. Hyperion took losses until 1994 when it published its most successful book to date, Don't Stand Too Close to a Naked Man by Tim Allen with 1.1 million copies sold. In March 1995 with the market too crowded with Disney books, Hyperion Books for Children merged with Disney Press. Hyperion Books for Children started a new imprint, Jump at the Sun, on September 7, 1998, for the African-American children's market. On April 9, 1999, Hyperion Books, sans its for-children stable mate, was transferred to Disney's ABC Group.

On May 14, 2004, Hyperion and Wenner Media agreed to a publishing and distribution deal for Wenner's new imprint Wenner Books beginning in spring 2005. On September 28, 2007, Hyperion Books moved its offices from the ABC headquarters at 77 West 66th Street to the Disney Publishing Worldwide offices at 114 Fifth Avenue, occupying two floors of the building, during the course of a partial move of Hyperion's operations to White Plains, New York.

=== Hachette Books ===
On June 28, 2013, Hachette announced that it would acquire Hyperion from Disney. In the deal, Hachette will take on Hyperion's adult trade list including works by Mitch Albom and Michael J. Fox and 25 books to be published. Hyperion's books related to existing Disney–ABC Television Group properties and young adult titles will join the Disney-Hyperion imprint at Disney Publishing Worldwide. On March 12, 2014, Hyperion was renamed Hachette Books, with the naming of Crown Archetype's editor-in-chief Mauro DiPreta as the new unit's vice president and publisher. On October 12, 2017, Hachette Book Group discontinued the Weinstein Books imprint due to the Harvey Weinstein sexual abuse allegations, with the imprint's staff and titles transferred to Hachette Books.

On January 8, 2015, Black Dog & Leventhal (BD&L) was purchased by Hachette Book Group and became an imprint of Hachette Books, with J.P. Leventhal, continuing his position as publisher of the imprint he founded in 1992. With Leventhal's announcement of his retirement on October 17, 2017, BD&L imprint was transferred to Running Press. In 2018, Hachette Books became an imprint of Perseus Books Group, with publisher DiPreta exiting the unit. Concurrently, Da Capo Press and Da Capo's Lifelong became part of Hachette. On April 8, 2019, the Perseus Books Group hired Disney Publishing's Mary Ann Naples as vice president and publisher of Hachette Books.

== Best sellers ==
- The Last Lecture by Randy Pausch
- Scar Tissue by Anthony Kiedis
- The Ghost and The Goth by Stacey Kade
- The Five People You Meet in Heaven by Mitch Albom
- Always Looking Up by Michael J. Fox
- Jamie’s Food Revolution by chef Jamie Oliver
- The Middle Place by Kelly Corrigan
- Monsters of Templeton by Lauren Groff
- The Tender Bar by JR Moehringer
- The Domestic Goddess by chef Nigella Lawson
- Don't Stand Too Close to a Naked Man (1994) by Tim Allen
- The Beardstown Ladies' Common-Sense Investment Guide (1995)
- Dixie City Jam by James Lee Burke
- Wayne's World by Mike Myers
- "Regis & Kathie Lee"
  - "Cooking with . . ."
  - "Entertaining with . . ."
- "Birnbaum's Walt Disney World"
- "Hope's Boy" by Andrew Bridge
- Pulp Fiction screenplay via Miramax
- Percy Jackson & the Olympians, The Heroes of Olympus, The Kane Chronicles, and Magnus Chase and the Gods of Asgard by Rick Riordan
- Artemis Fowl by Eoin Colfer
- The War on Normal People by 2020 Democratic Candidate Andrew Yang
