= Non-Broadcastable =

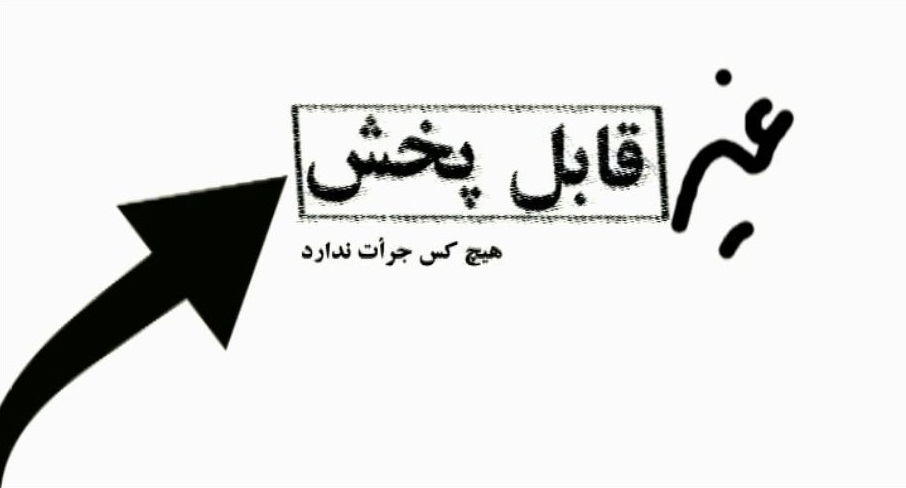
- Directed by: Jamshid BayatTork
- Original language: Persian

Production
- Producer: Seyed Jalal Chavoshian

Original release
- Release: 2015 – 2015

Non-Broadcastable (Persian: غیرقابل پخش, is a stand-up comedy television program directed by Jamshid BayatTork, written by Shahram Shakiba and produced by Seyyed Jalal Chavoshian made for IRIB channel 5.

== Plot ==
This television satire and social criticism produced in 100 less than 10 minutes episodes in 2009 starring Mohammad Solouki. This satirical television program tries to look at the cultural issues confronting society and modernity, occurred the metropolitan area of Tehran.

Mohammad Solouki tries to criticize these social phenomena in every episode with humorous stories. Non-Broadcastable's production lasted two years. At first it was aired in the box of Tehran20 television program on IRIB 5. Then as an independent program aired on IRIB5 and IRIB Amoozesh.

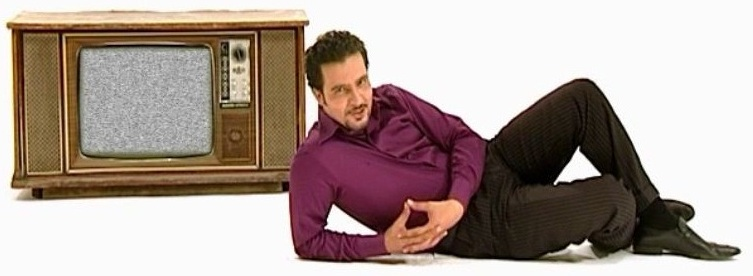
Mohammad Solouki starring Non-Broadcastable

== Writers ==
Shahram Shakiba as the lead author wrote 47 scripts. Jamshid BayatTork wrote 24 scripts, Jalal Samiee 24 scripts, Reza Saki 2 scripts, Narges Ghaderi and Omid Mehdinejad and Mehdi Ostad Ahmad each one episode each as other script writers.

== Episode titles ==
Episode	Title	Script Writer
01	Buying a Car (Mashin Kharidan)	Shahram Shakiba
02	Wealth (Sarmaye)	Shahram Shakiba
03	70 cm (70-sant)	Shahram Shakiba
04	Construction (Sakht-o-Saz)	Shahram Shakiba
05	Health (Salamati)	Shahram Shakiba
06	Spending Money (Pool Kharj Kardan)	Shahram Shakiba
07	Garbage (Zobale)	Shahram Shakiba
08	Debt (Bedehi)	Shahram Shakiba
09	Medication 1 (Darou 1)	Shahram Shakiba
10	Medication 2 (Darou 2)	Shahram Shakiba
11	Rich (Pool-Dari)	Shahram Shakiba
12	Yellow Press (Nashriate Zard)	Shahram Shakiba
13	Parvenu (Nadid badid)	Shahram Shakiba
14	Having Car Problems (Moshkelat-e-Mashin Dashtan)	Shahram Shakiba
15	Hair (Mou)	Shahram Shakiba
16	Sleep (Khaab)	Shahram Shakiba
17	Loan (Gharz)	Shahram Shakiba
18	(Abdarchi)	Shahram Shakiba
19	University (daneshgah)	Shahram Shakiba
20	Odd Jobs (Mashaghel-e-Ajib)	Shahram Shakiba
21	Motorcycling (Motor-Savari)	Shahram Shakiba
22	Management (Modiriat)	Shahram Shakiba
23	Apartment (Aparteman)	Shahram Shakiba
24	The Internet	Shahram Shakiba
25	Propaganda (Tablighat)	Shahram Shakiba
26	Taking down a peg (rook am koni)	Shahram Shakiba
27	Intervention 1 (Dekhalat Dar Omoor-e-Digaran 1)	Shahram Shakiba
28	Intervention 2 (Dekhalat Dar Omoor-e-Digaran 2)	Shahram Shakiba
29	Speaking Properly (Dorost Harf Zadan)	Jamshid BayatTork
30	Charger	Jamshid BayatTork
31	Brain Drain 1 (Farar-e-Maghzha 1)	Shahram Shakiba
32	Brain Drain 2 (Farar-e-Maghzha 2)	Shahram Shakiba
33	Self-confidence	Jalal Samiee
34	Diet 1 (Regim 1)	Jalal Samiee
35	Diet 2 (Regim 2)	Jalal Samiee
36	Imprisonment (Habs)	Jamshid BayatTork
37	(Khodkar)	Jalal Samiee
38	Distrust 1 (Bi-Etemadi 1)	Jamshid BayatTork
39	Distrust 2 (Bi-Etemadi 2)	Jamshid BayatTork
40	Note (Yad-dasht)	Jalal Samiee
41	Waiting Room (Otagh-e-Entezar)	Jalal Samiee
42	Having Car (Mashin-Dari)	Omid Mehdinejad
43	Vendor (Dast-Foroush)	Jalal Samiee
44	Dresser (komod)	Jalal Samiee
45	Apology (Ozr-Khahi)	Jamshid BayatTork
46	Department (Edareh)	Jalal Samiee
47	Lie (Dorough)	Jamshid BayatTork
48	From Tomorrow (Az Farda)	Jalal Samiee
49	ATM (Aaber Bank)	Narges Ghaderi
50	Tableau (Taablo)	Jalal Samiee
51	Fruit (Miveh)	Jalal Samiee
52	Duplicity (Ria)	Shahram Shakiba
53	Subway (Metro)	Jamshid BayatTork
54	People`s Word (Harf-e Mardom)	Jamshid BayatTork
55	Fighting Couple (Dava-ye Zan-O-Shohar)	Jamshid BayatTork
56	Niggardly (Khesasat)	Jamshid BayatTork
57	(Poz Dadan)	Jamshid BayatTork
58	Propaganda 1 (Tablighat 1)	Jalal Samiee
59	Propaganda 2 (Tablighat 2)	Jalal Samiee
60	Work (Kaar)	Jamshid BayatTork
61	Knife (Chaqoo)	Jalal Samiee
62	Earthquake 1 (ZelZeleh 1)	Jamshid BayatTork
63	Earthquake 2 (ZelZeleh 2)	Jamshid BayatTork
64	Account (Etebar)	Jalal Samiee
65	(Qesas)	Jamshid BayatTork
66	Horn (Booq Zadan)	Reza Saki
67	Negotiation (Monazereh)	Reza Saki
68	Disappointment (Na-Omidi)	Jalal Samiee
69	Henpecked (Zan-Zalil)	Jamshid BayatTork
70	Fight (Da-va)	Jalal Samiee
71	Book 1 (Ketab 1)	Shahram Shakiba
72	Book 2 (Ketab 2)	Shahram Shakiba
73	Beggary 1 (Gedaei 1)	Shahram Shakiba
74	Beggary 2 (Gedaei 2)	Shahram Shakiba
75	Hospital 1 (Bimarestan 1)	Shahram Shakiba
76	Hospital 2 (Bimarestan 2)	Shahram Shakiba
77	Picture 1 (Ax 1)	Shahram Shakiba
78	Picture 2 (Ax 2)	Shahram Shakiba
79	Picture 3 (Ax 3)	Shahram Shakiba
80	Say No 1 (Na Goftan 1)	Shahram Shakiba
81	Say No 2 (Na Goftan 2)	Shahram Shakiba
82	Joke 1 (Shukhi 1)	Shahram Shakiba
83	Joke 2 (Shukhi 2)	Shahram Shakiba
84	(Ghave-Khane)	Shahram Shakiba
85	Choice (Entekhab)	Shahram Shakiba
86	Glue (Chasb)	Jalal Samiee
87	Television	Mehdi Ostad Ahmad
88	Pollution(Aloodegi)	Jamshid BayatTork
89	Punctuality (vaght-shenasi)	Jalal Samiee
90	Noise Pollution(Aloodegi-e-Soti)	Shahram Shakiba
91	Forgetfulness (Faramoushi)	Jamshid BayatTork
92	Seat 1 (Sandali 1)	Jalal Samiee
93	Seat 2 (Sandali 2)	Jalal Samiee
94	Brand (Jense Mark Dar)	Jamshid BayatTork
95	Narcissism (Khod-Shiftegi)	Jamshid BayatTork
96	(khoone tekooni)	Jalal Samiee
97	Queue 1 (saf 1)	Jamshid BayatTork
98	Queue 2 (saf 2)	Jamshid BayatTork
99	Compliment ( Taarof)	Jamshid BayatTork
100	Persian Language (Zaban-e-Farsi)	Jalal Samiee

== Credits ==
- Producer: Seyyed Jalal Chavoshian
- Executive Producer: Masoumeh Fard Shahin
- Script Writers:
  - Shahram Shakiba
  - Jamshid BayatTork
  - Jalal Samiee
  - Reza Saki
  - Narges Ghaderi
  - Omid Mehdinejad
  - Mehdi Ostad Ahmad
