= Nirvana High =

"Nirvana High" is a science fiction short story by Eileen Gunn and Leslie What. It was first published in Gunn's 2004 collection Stable Strategies and Others.

== Synopsis ==
Barbara is a student at Kurt Cobain High School, where everyone has a tendency to self-harm; as well, many of the students and faculty have superpowers.

== Reception ==
"Nirvana High" was a finalist for the 2005 Nebula Award for Best Novelette. The Seattle Times commended Gunn's "knack for blending a bizarre premise and an offhand, colloquial tone".

At the SF Site, Paul Kincaid considered the story "promising", but ultimately "disappointing since it never quite explores its idea with the courage it demands, and ends flatly rather than with the resolution that could have lifted it." Strange Horizons questioned the story's presence in 2006's James Tiptree Award Anthology 2, as its "gender credentials appear rather weak".

Tangent Online lauded the story's "forgiving, we're-all-in-this-together outlook"; Abigail Nussbaum, however, called it unmemorable and 'essentially plotless', with "(t)he ordinariness of Barbara's problems overwhelm[ing] the extraordinariness of their setting."

== Background ==
Gunn has noted that, when she wrote the story in 1997 — prior to the Columbine High School massacre — the idea of a school being legally forbidden to prevent students from being armed, and therefore installing technology to monitor students' emotional state in the hopes of detecting aggression, was intended as satire. She has also stated that, by 2004, she was unable to tell which parts of the story were written by her and which by her co-writer.
