= You Should Meet My Son! =

2010 film by Keith Hartman

- Directed by: Keith Hartman
- Written by: Keith Hartman
- Starring: Joanne McGee; Carol Goans; Stewart Carrico; Ginger Pullman; Steve Snyder; Acqua Dansoh; Matt Palazzolo; Chris Nolan
- Release date: 2010
- Running time: 91 minutes
- Country: United States
- Language: English

You Should Meet My Son! is a 2010 gay-themed comedy film written and directed by Keith Hartman. Its plot concerns a conservative mother coming to terms with her son's homosexuality.

A sequel titled You Should Meet My Son 2! was released in 2018.

== Plot ==
A conservative widow, Mae Davis (Joanne McGee) and her spinster sister Rose (Carol Goans) are determined to find the perfect girl for Mae's son Brian (Stewart Carrico), until they accidentally discover that Brian is gay and had been in a relationship for the previous five years with Dennis, who they thought was just his roommate.

After coming to terms with her son's homosexuality and learning that Dennis left Brian for another man, Mae decides to find the perfect man for Brian. She and Rose explore online gay dating and visit a gay bar, where they befriend drag queens, leathermen and an art student, Chase (Steve Snyder) who works in the bar as a stripper.

They host a dinner, intending to introduce Brian and Chase, but Brian surprises them by arriving with Jennie Sue (Ginger Pullman), the daughter of a Christian preacher, and announcing that he is no longer gay and that he intends to marry her shortly. Mae is convinced that Brian is shying away from the possibility of love to avoid being hurt as he was by Dennis, but she decides not to let him trap himself into a loveless marriage.

Mae hosts another dinner, this time inviting her friends from the gay bar and the members of a local gay youth group as well as Jennie Sue's parents. The party quickly devolves into chaos, and ends with Brian admitting that he can't marry Jennie Sue since he's still gay, while Jennie Sue's parents reveal that she's a closeted lesbian and disown her.

Mae and Rose take Jennie Sue to live with them for the time being, and the movie ends with all characters celebrating Brian and Jennie Sue's newfound freedom, leaving open a possibility for Brian and Chase to get together.

== Cast ==
- Joanne McGee as Mae Davis, a conservative widow who learns her only son is gay
- Carol Goans as Rose, Mae's spinster sister
- Stewart Carrico as Brian, Mae's closeted son
- Ginger Pullman as Jennie Sue, Brian's fiancée
- Steve Snyder as Chase, an art student who works part-time as a stripper
- Acqua Dansoh as Lady Fantasia Extravaganza, a drag queen who becomes friends of Mae and Rose
- Matt Palazzolo as Salsa Rojah, Fantasia's protégé drag queen
- Chris Nolan as Greg, Mae's teenage neighbor

== Production ==
The film was shot in 18 days in diverse locations in Los Angeles.
