= Bantuil, Cerbon, Barito Kuala =

Bantuil Desa Bantuil
- Village
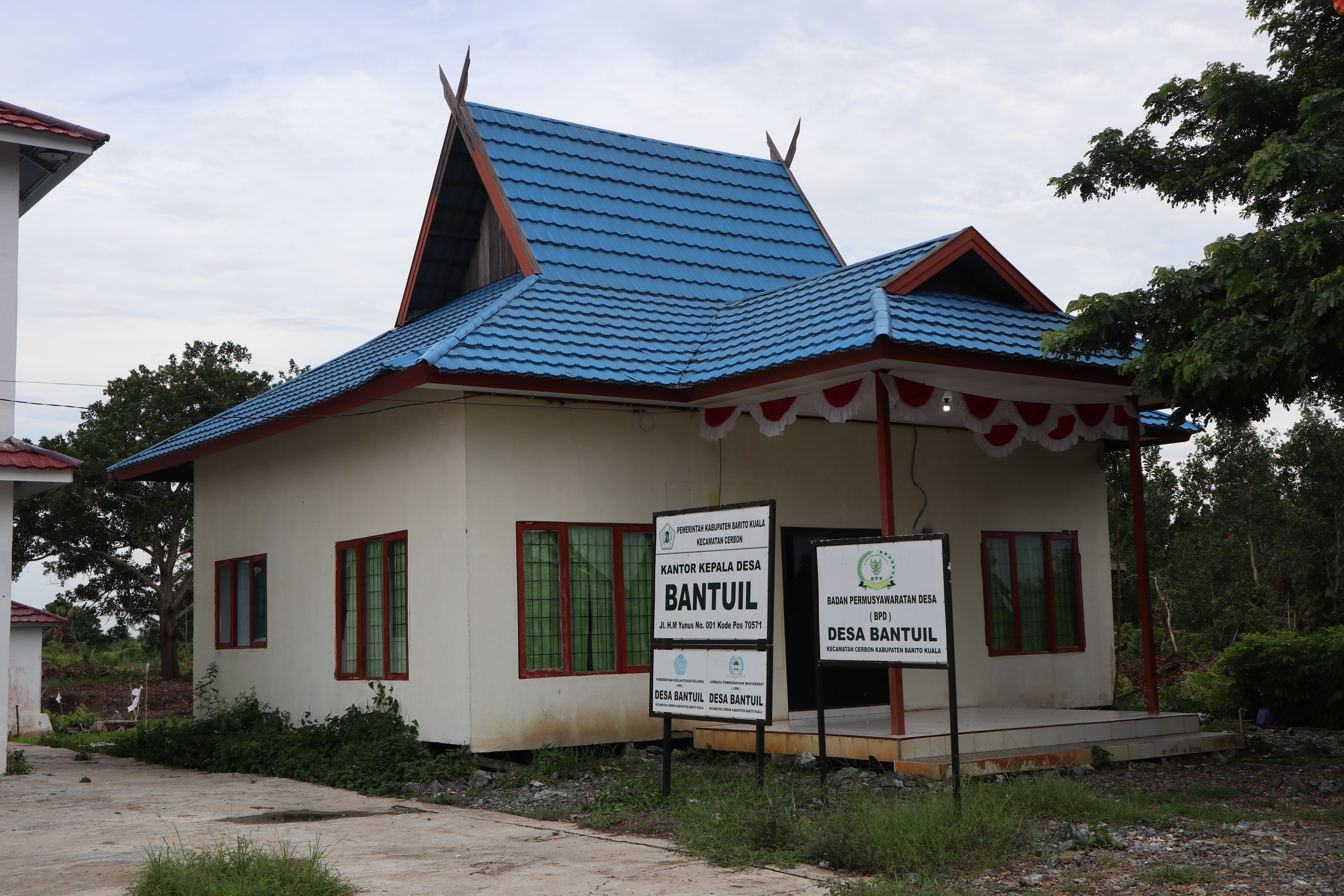
- Country: Indonesia
- Province: South Kalimantan
- Regency: Barito Kuala
- Districts: Cerbon
- Time zone: UTC+8:00 (WITA)
- Postal code: 70571

Bantuil is a village in Cerbon District, Barito Kuala Regency, South Kalimantan, Indonesia.

== Infrastructure ==
A local school in the village serves about 120 children.

In 2017, an affordable housing initiative added fourteen houses to the village.
