= The Ghost and the Goth =

2010 novel by Stacey Kade

- Author: Stacey Kade
- Language: English
- Series: The Ghost and the Goth Trilogy (Book 1)
- Genre: Paranormal Romance
- Publisher: Hyperion Books
- Publication date: July 06, 2010
- Publication place: United States
- Media type: Print (hardback, paperback)
- Pages: 281
- ISBN: 978-1-4231-2197-8
- Followed by: Queen of the Dead

The Ghost and the Goth is a 2010 paranormal romance young adult novel written by Stacey Kade and published by Hyperion Books. It is the first book in her The Ghost and the Goth Trilogy. The book follows two different view points, Alona Dare (The Ghost) and Will Killian (The Goth).

== Plot summary ==
Alona Dare was the most popular girl in school, at least she was until she was hit by a bus. Returning to the scene of her death as a ghost, she expects everyone to be upset over her death, but her classmates move on faster than she had hoped. The only person that can see and hear her is Will Killian, the school outcast and ghost-talker. Alona, used to getting her own way, haunts Will until he agrees to help her figure out how to cross over to the big white light that she keeps expecting. Will has problems of his own; every ghost in Groundsboro High, including a seething black mass of energy, knows that he can see them, and they all want him to carry out their final wishes. Will and Alona have to work together to get the ghosts to move on, and figure out what Alona has to do in order to move on to the white light.

== Major characters ==
- Alona Dare (The Ghost): High School senior, captain of the cheerleading squad, and Homecoming Queen three years in a row. After dying, Alona is having a difficult time adjusting to her new ghost life and she finds out what people really think about her.
- Will Killian (The Goth): High School senior, outcast, and unintentional troublemaker. He possesses the ability to see ghosts and is the only person who can help Alona cross over to the light.
- Joonie: Will's best friend.
- Lily: Will and Joonie's friend that falls into a coma after a car accident.
- Julia Killian: Will's mother.
- Dr. Miller: Will's psychologist.

== Sequels ==
The Ghost and the Goth is followed by Queen of the Dead and Body and Soul
