= Ghost Station (novel) =

2024 book

- Author: S. A. Barnes
- Audio read by: Zura Johnson
- Language: English
- Genre: Sci-fi horror
- Publisher: Tor Nightfire
- Publication date: 2024
- Publication place: United States
- Media type: Print (hardback, paperback), ebook, audiobook
- Pages: 384 pages
- ISBN: 1250884926 First edition hardcover
- Preceded by: Dead Silence
- Followed by: Cold Eternity

Ghost Station is a 2024 science-fiction horror novel written by American author Stacey Kade, under the pen name of S. A. Barnes. She has also described the novel as psychological and body horror.

== Synopsis ==
Ophelia Bray is a psychologist who has made her career focusing on Eckhart-Reiser syndrome (ERS), a mysterious ailment that can cause derangement and other issues in space-faring people. It's also controversial, as some believe it is fictional while others fear getting labeled with ERS, as it can mark them as essentially unhireable. One day, one of Ophelia's clients ends up committing suicide in an extremely public fashion, making her the focus of criticism and controversy. She takes a job aboard a small exploration ship in order to wait out the scandal, testing out new technology geared towards helping improve the crew's quality of rest and reducing the chances of developing ERS.

The crew is largely unwelcoming, as they see Ophelia as an interloper, particularly after learning that she is related to a wealthy and powerful family. Contrary to their belief, Ophelia did not grow up in wealth and privilege, as she was initially raised on a mining planet, and only joined the family after her father brutally murdered almost everyone at the colony. She decides to keep this a secret, aware that the crew knowing would lead to her becoming further ostracized.

The crew lands on a planet with strange ruins believed to be part of a former civilization, in order to reclaim the remnants of an abandoned outpost and see if it is suitable for recolonization. Shortly after landing, both Ophelia and the crew begin to experience strange phenomenon and some begin to act erratically. Ophelia begins to fear that some or all of them may be suffering from ERS or there may be another person or presence on the planet that is sabotaging their efforts.

Ultimately Ophelia and the crew learn that the ruins are actually a parasitic alien lifeform that happens to look like buildings when they form large colonies. The crew's parent company was fully aware of the parasites' existence and were hoping that the crew would return infected so that the company could use them for experiments. Unwilling to let them have their way, Ophelia and crew enter into cold statis and send out a message broadcasting the truth. The novel ends with her and the others waking decades into the future, after a cure for the parasite has been found.

== Development ==
While writing the book Barnes was inspired by the Great Filter theory, which posits that most space travel is impossible for most civilizations because they will most likely be destroyed before interstellar travel is possible for them. She was also influenced by her paternal grandmother, who had dementia. In her early stages the grandmother would seem normal but would have occasional periods of confusion, fear, and memory loss. Barnes found the idea of this terrifying, "To suddenly look around and find the familiar completely altered, to feel like something in you has shifted outside your control." Other influences include John Carpenter's The Thing, Andrei Tarkovsky's Solaris, and Denis Villeneuve's Arrival.

Of its continuity with Dead Silence, Barnes has stated that "They could be set in the same fictional universe. There’s enough of a time gap between the stories that technology could have advanced to this point from the Dead Silence universe."

== Release ==
Ghost Station was first released in the United States in hardback and e-book formats on April 9, 2024, through Tor Nightfire. An audiobook adaptation narrated by Zura Johnson was released simultaneously through MacMillan Audio.

The novel was translated into German and released through Wilhelm Heyne Verlag in 2025. The novel will receive a hardback release in the United Kingdom through Bantam in 2026.

== Reception ==
Upon release Ghost Station received reviews from outlets such as The New York Times and Wall Street Journal. Reviewers for Grimdark Magazine and Reactor were favorable, praising the book's atmosphere. A reviewer for the Chicago Review of Books was mixed, criticizing the pacing while also stating that "The centering of humanity and self-worth makes the story in Ghost Station worthwhile, if not feel-good, as characters confront their faults head-on."
