= All the White Spaces =

2022 novel by Ally Wilkes

- First edition cover
- Author: Ally Wilkes
- Language: English
- Genres: Horror; Supernatural; Alternate history
- Publisher: Titan Books
- Publication date: 21 January 2022
- Publication place: United Kingdom
- Media type: Trade paperback
- Pages: 496
- ISBN: 978-1-78909-783-2

All the White Spaces is an alternate history, horror and supernatural novel by English writer Ally Wilkes. It is her debut novel and was first published in the United Kingdom in January 2022 by Titan Books. It is about a trans man who joins an expedition to Antarctica in 1920, where he is tormented by supernatural apparitions.

The book's title was derived from the following quote by Ernest Shackleton, which Wilkes includes at the beginning of the novel:

Men go out into the void spaces of the world for various reasons. Some are actuated simply by a love of adventure, some have the keen thirst for scientific knowledge, and others again are drawn away from the trodden paths by the “lure of little voices,” the mysterious fascination of the unknown.

— Ernest Shackleton, The Heart of the Antarctic (1914)

All the White Spaces was nominated for the 2022 Bram Stoker Award for Best First Novel.

== Plot summary ==
Jonathan Morgan is a trans man from Portsmouth, England. He was previously called Jo and was the sister of two older brothers who were killed in France in 1918 during World War I. His brothers planned on enlisting with polar explorer James Randall after the war in a 1920 British expedition to the South Pole. Jo decides to honour them by taking their place on the voyage. The eighteen-year-old changes his name to Jonathan, dresses like a man, and stows away aboard Randall's ship, the Fortitude, bound for Antarctica.

Jonathan hides in a storage closet aboard the Fortitude, but is discovered after five days. Randall is not happy with a stowaway on board, but agrees to let him stay on as a "spare". It takes several days before Jonathan earns the respect of the crew when he saves the navigator from certain death.

Disaster strikes the Fortitude in the frozen Weddell Sea off Coats Land on Antarctica's west coast. A fire on board forces the crew to abandon ship. They manage to make it ashore but have to survive on the frozen land with minimal provisions. Randall is determined to locate a German expedition led by Karlmann that landed in the same area two years previously, but had never returned. Randall eventually finds Karlmann's huts, but they have been abandoned and there is no sign of the Germans.

As Randall's crew prepares to overwinter in the huts, they find themselves seeing and hearing things in the dark and the wind and the ever-shifting aurora. Some of the men are lured out into the frozen wasteland and never return. Jonathan is convinced his brothers are out there, and is tempted to follow them. It soon becomes apparent what happened to the Germans.

== Background ==
Wilkes stated that All the White Spaces is set in an alternate history to the one in which Ernest Shackleton and others explored Antarctica in the first two decades of the twentieth century. She said it takes place "in an imagined tail-end to the Heroic Age of Antarctic Exploration".

Wilkes said she has always been fascinated by the early polar expeditions. It is "the unbeatable combination of harsh and deadly terrain, isolation, claustrophobia". What also interested her was the Edwardian era that these events took place in, when "heroism, sacrifice and other very 'masculine' ideals" were the order of the day. But after reading a statement Fergus Fleming wrote in his introduction to the 2004 edition of Shackleton's South, that "the concept of heroism evaporated in the trenches of the First World War," Wilkes "immediately knew [she] wanted to tackle a post-WW1 Antarctic story".

Shackleton's 1914–1917 Endurance expedition had the biggest influence on All the White Spaces. Wilkes said it has all the ingredients of a compelling story: a stowaway, a shipwreck, and stranded on the ice and cut off from the rest of the world. She added that the unfolding drama "has moments of great poignancy and supernatural tinges", and the persistent sensation that there is something out there.

Wilkes said the novel's narrator, Jonathan, "was my key to this world". She explained that he is "trapped by his assigned gender", and when an opportunity presents itself to join Randall's expedition to Antarctica and its male-dominated world of "hero-worship and grave peril", he seizes it. Shackleton, Scott and others noted that "such treacherous explorations inevitably revealed the true nature of the explorers", and Wilkes added, "Down south ... you see who you really are. Anything you use to conceal your identity or conceal your true qualities comes off."

== Critical reception ==
A reviewer in Publishers Weekly described All the White Spaces as "a gripping narrative that is [an] explorer’s yarn, [a] trans man’s coming-of-age story, and a tale of a survivor grappling with horrors that defy definition." They said that while "not every thread is taut" and parts of novel are "unconvincing", "[t]he story’s heart, however, beats strongly throughout" and "[f]ans of historical horror will be enthralled."

In a review at the British Fantasy Society, Sarah Deeming wrote that "Wilkes has created the perfect environment for a truly spine chilling yarn." She said that while masculinity dominates the story, "themes of gender identity, sexuality and self" are "all sensitively and honestly handled." The book's supernatural elements are "well-crafted" and "sinister as any ghost or nameless evil entity". Deeming complimented the author on the way she never reveals the source of the terrors, whether they are supernatural or in the minds of troubled individuals.

Reviewing the book in SFBook Reviews, Sam Tyler wrote that the horror in All the White Spaces is not just about monsters, it is also about the "horror of the mind". He noted that after World War I, people resorted to the occult in an attempt to explain the carnage that had taken place, and the crew of the Fortitude were quick to use the supernatural to explain what was happening to them. He described the novel as "a good study of the time" that "captures the horror and tension of a 1920's group of explorers setting out into the unknown."

Writing in the Los Angeles Review of Books, Lowell Duckert described All the White Spaces as "a trip into an abyss limned by the sublime and Gothic" with "a phantasmic shapeshifter who preys upon its victim’s deepest emotions". But he added that another of the book's horrors is Randall's "heroic masculinity" that demands "scripted gender roles meant to display strength, grit, and honor" from his crew. Lowell said that Jonathan, the book's narrator, is Wilkes' "most significant contribution" to Antarctic literature:

"The habitual depiction of cisgender men on ice propels a macho feedback loop, which, in turn, promotes this pattern of risky behavior as the norm. Jonathan’s [presence] is a welcome break from the cycle, despite being so easily swayed by its stereotypes at first."

== See also ==
- List of alternate history fiction
- List of LGBT-themed speculative fiction
- List of LGBT characters in modern written fiction

== Works cited ==
- Wilkes, Ally (2022). All the White Spaces. Titan Books. ISBN 978-1-78909-783-2.
