= The Splinter in the Sky =

2023 novel by Kemi Ashing-Giwa

- Author: Kemi Ashing-Giwa
- Language: English
- Genre: Science fiction
- Publisher: Simon & Schuster
- Publication date: July 11, 2023
- Publication place: United States
- Pages: 350
- Award: Compton Crook Award (2024)
- ISBN: 9781668008478

The Splinter in the Sky is the debut novel of American writer Kemi Ashing-Giwa. Written during her sophomore year at Harvard University when she was 19, the book was published by Saga Press, an imprint of Simon & Schuster, in July 2023, when she was 22. It appeared on the USA Today Bestseller list and won the 2024 Compton Crook Award.

== Reception ==
The Splinter in the Sky earned starred reviews from Kirkus, Publishers Weekly, Booklist, and BookPage. It won the 2024 Compton Crook Award and appeared on the 2023 Locus Recommended Reading List alongside Ashing-Giwa's short story "Thin Ice" in Clarkesworld Magazine.

The novel was highlighted as one of the best debuts of the year by BookPage and Booklist, and was named one of the best science fiction books of 2023 by BiblioLifestyle, and of July by Amazon and New Scientist. It was further featured in Ebony, Tor.com/Reactor, Ms. Magazine, Publishers Weekly, Gizmodo, Goodreads, Literary Hub, and Brittle Paper.

Critic Aigner Loren Wilson, writing for Lightspeed Magazine, called the debut "intriguing and enthralling," highlighting the "cultural divides, setting, and bigotry in the world in a way that mimics... what marginalized people from colonized cultures in the real-world face."

Natalie Zutter, writing for Reactor Magazine, wrote that Ashing-Giwa had discovered "inventive new ways to critique colonialism through a sci-fi lens, in a standalone novel that nonetheless has an eye toward a hopeful future." She concluded that readers will "find a profound message that will stick with you long after you're done."
