= The Insanity of Normality =

Book by Arno Gruen

The Insanity of Normality: Toward Understanding Human Destructiveness
- Author: Arno Gruen
- Original title: Der Wahnsinn der Normalität – Realismus als Krankheit. Eine grundlegende Theorie zur menschlichen Destruktivität
- Language: German
- Publication date: 1987

The Insanity of Normality: Toward Understanding Human Destructiveness is a book about the root causes of cruelty and violence written by psychoanalyst Arno Gruen.

It is Gruen's answer to Freud about human destructiveness. According to Freud, human beings are born with an innate tendency to destruction and violence; in The Insanity of Normality, Gruen challenges that assumption, arguing instead that at the root of evil lies self-hatred, a rage originating in a self-betrayal that begins in childhood, when autonomy is surrendered in exchange for the "love" of those who wield power over us.

== Edition details ==
- German editions: Der Wahnsinn der Normalität – Realismus als Krankheit. Eine grundlegende Theorie zur menschlichen Destruktivität; Kösel-Verlag, München 1987, ISBN 3-466-34178-7, 9th edition 7/1999, München, ISBN 3-423-35002-4
- English editions: The Insanity of Normality: Understanding Human Destructiveness, ISBN 978-0-9669908-4-3, trade paperback, most recent English edition: March 2007, Human Development Books, Berkeley, CA, first English edition: 1992)
- Czech edition: Šílenství normality. Realismus jako choroba: Teorie o lidské destruktivitě, Lumír Nahodil, Praha, 2001, ISBN 80-902970-0-5 (translated from the 9th German edition)
- Hungarian edition: A normalitás tébolya – A realizmus mint betegség: elmélet az emberi destruktivitásról, Balázs István, Magyar Könyvklub, 2003, ISBN 9635478631 (translated from the 9th German edition)
