= Ally Wilkes =

British author

- Occupations: Novelist; Short story writer
- Writing career
- Period: 2020–present
- Genres: Horror; Fantasy
- Website: allywilkes.com

Ally Wilkes is an LGBTQ English author of horror novels and short stories. She also writes under the name A. V. Wilkes. Wilkes studied law at the University of Oxford and practised as a criminal barrister for eleven years. She currently lives in Greenwich, London.

Wilkes has published two novels, All the White Spaces (2022) and Where the Dead Wait (2023), both alternate history polar exploration stories set in early twentieth-century Antarctica and nineteenth-century Arctic respectively. She said she has always been fascinated by the early polar expeditions and "the unbeatable combination of harsh and deadly terrain, isolation, claustrophobia".

Wilkes has also published several works of short fiction and is Book Reviews Editor for the British horror website, Horrified. All the White Spaces was nominated for the 2022 Bram Stoker Award for Best First Novel.

== Bibliography ==
=== Novels ===
- All the White Spaces (Titan Books, January 2022) – nominated for the 2022 Bram Stoker Award for Best First Novel
- Where the Dead Wait (Atria Books, December 2023)

=== Short fiction ===
- "You're About to See This Colour Everywhere" (Three Crows Magazine, July 2020) – short story
- "Where Things Fall from the Sky" (Nightmare Magazine, August 2021) – short story
- "Who's That Trip Trappin'" (It Calls from the Doors, October 2021) – short story
- "Darkness Falls" (Cloisterfox, Spring/Summer 2022) – short story
- "Summons" (Found: An Anthology of Found Footage Horror Stories, October 2022) – short story
- Jamie Hallow and the End of the World (Cemetery Gates Media, July 2023) – novella, using the name A. V. Wilkes
