= Queer Free =

1981 novel

- Author: Alabama Birdstone
- Language: English
- Publication date: 1981

Queer Free is a 1981 novel by Alabama Birdstone. It is about a right-wing takeover of the American government by the "New Right", a religiously fundamentalist organization, which sentences gays and lesbians to extermination camps. It received mixed critical reception in the gay press and by LGBT academics.

== Background and publication ==
Although the most prominent example of anti-gay persecution may be the Nazi Party's violent persecution of gay men, there have been fears of mass killings and genocides of gay people for centuries. Queer Free was published within an eradication-fearing milieu of gay literature, and both before and after its publication, there were fears of the government obliterating gay life within the United States by its right wing. Alabama Birdstone, (Note: "Alabama Birdstone" was a pseudonym. The copyright of the book was attributed to Ed Boggs.) a writer and former sociology teacher and social worker, finished writing Queer Free in 1978. In 1981, Calamus Books, a press in New York, published it and sold it for $6.

The book is about the formation of an American fascist, religiously fundamentalist, right-wing social movement called the "New Right". It takes control of the United States and (through the President's Commission on Sodomites) establishes extermination camps for gays and lesbians.

== Reception ==
Writing for the Bay Area Reporter in the year of the novel's publication, literary critic Frank J. Howell said that the book had serious flaws—it was not believable in the slightest—and he understood why Calamus Books, a small press, had published it instead of a mainstream one. (Note: In the next issue of the Bay Area Reporter, Gary Battleman of San Francisco wrote a letter to the editor disagreeing with Howell's review of the book and urging his "gay brothers and sisters, read QUEER FREE before you are not free to read at all". Paul Lorch, the editor, appended a note to the letter (entitled "No Likey Bookie Review") that said: "Letter reads very much like an advertisement for the book – one wonders??".) Reviewer Johnie Staggs of Lambda News declared: "Queer Free is undoubtedly the most poorly written book I have ever read; and, yet, I want every gay person in the world to read it".

LGBT academics Eric Garber and Lyn Paleo gave Queer Free a mixed review, saying that while the artistic vision of the novel was "strong", there were issues with "characterization and plot development". By contrast, even though they accepted that the novel seemed "poorly edited" and more like "an initial rough draft", Dimid Hayes and Michael Glover said that the novel indicated a reality for LGBT people in America: "we're not safe". Similarly, Ian Young wrote in 1981 that "in light of recent events", a large-scale persecution of LGBT people was possible, and Queer Free (though poorly-written) attempted to demonstrate what a crack-down on gay life would look like.

Garber and Paleo compared the novel to the works of Tim Barrus and Orson Welles. Novelist Daniel Curzon compared the novel to Paul Welles's Project Lambda – another book that described "a holocaust for gays" – though Curzon implores readers to read Welles's book instead of Birdstone's.

== Notes and references ==
=== Bibliography ===
- Birdstone, Alabama (1981). Queer Free. Calamus Books. ISBN 0-930762-04-5.
- Birimisa, George (June 26, 1981). "Queer Free". Review. The Sentinel. Vol. 8, no. 13.
- Curzon, Daniel (September 10, 1981). "Queer Free". Review. Gazette Newspaper. Vol. 2, no. 37. p. 13. Gale AZGUMB640398614.
- Garber, Eric; Paleo, Lyn (1990). Uranian worlds: A guide to alternative sexuality in science fiction, fantasy, and horror (second ed.). G. K. Hall & Co.
- Hayes, Dimid; Glover, Michael (July 1981). "So, you think you're safe?". Gay Community News. Vol. 9, no. 1. p. 7. Gale LDLLUY535839429.
- Howell, Frank J. (April 23, 1981). "Queer Free!". Review. Bay Area Reporter. Vol. 11, no. 9. p. 27.
- Jacobs, Rick; Taft, Jenifer (June 20, 1981). "Queer Free". Review. GaZe. Vol. 2, no. 6. p. 10. Gale MNXYFU641616621.
- Long, Thomas L. (2005). AIDS and American apocalypticism: the cultural semiotics of an epidemic. Albany, NY: State University of New York Press. ISBN 9780791461686.
- Lorch, Paul (May 21, 1981). "No likey bookie review". Bay Area Reporter. Vol. 11, no. 11. p. 6.
- Staggs, Johnie (September 4, 1981). "Queer Free". Review. Lambda News. Vol. VI, no. XVI. p. 14. Gale SRRLQJ149649919.
- Young, Ian (October 1981). "Oscar & Alfred & Eric & Phil". The Ivory Tunnel. Body Politic. No. 77. p. 37.
- Young, Ian (1982). The male homosexual in literature: A bibliography (second ed.). Scarecrow Press.
