= Carrie Richerson =

American science fiction writer (1952–2019)

Carrie Richardson
- Born: November 1, 1952; Mississippi, U.S.
- Died: February 2, 2019 (aged 66); Austin, Texas, U.S.
- Writing career
- Genre: Science fiction

Carrie Richerson (November 1, 1952 - February 2, 2019) was an American science fiction fan and bookseller who was also a science fiction writer repeatedly nominated for international awards.

== Biography ==
Born Carrie Richerson in Mississippi November 1, 1952, she got her degree from Rice University in Houston, Texas, where she studied Mathematics. She lived in Austin where she was involved in the local science fiction fandom and where she worked as a bookseller. Richerson was involved in running conventions and she was part of the team that ran the 1997 Worldcon, LoneStarCon 2. She also wrote short fiction, beginning in the 1990s. Her work was published in a number of magazines, including Amazing Stories, Asimov's, F&SF, Pulphouse, and Realms of Fantasy. Richerson was nominated for a Campbell Award twice. Her work also appeared in a collection and other anthologies. Elizabeth Moon thanked her in her novel Against the Odds in 2000. Richerson died in 2019 in an Austin rehabilitation center due to years of poor health.

== Selected works ==
=== Short fiction ===
Year	Title	First published	Reprinted/collected	Notes
1992	Apotheosis			
1993	Phases			
1993	By the Waters of Lethe We Sat Down and Wept			
1994	The Emerald City			
1994	Sous La Mer			
1994	Artistic License			
1994	Geckos	Richerson, Carrie (1994). Geckos. Roadkill Press.		Chapbook
1995	No end in sight	Richerson, Carrie. "No end in sight". In Gilliam, Richard; Greenberg, Martin H.; Kramer, Edward E. & Wendy Webb (eds.). More phobias : stories of unparalleled paranoia. Pocket Books.		
1996	Healer			
1996	The Harrowing			
1997	Nuestra Señora	Richerson, Carrie (1997). "Nuestra Señora". In Grant, Charles L. & Wendy Webb (eds.). Gothic ghosts. Tor.		
1998	Juanito, the Magic Beans, and the Giant			
1998	The City in Morning			
2001	The golden chain	Richerson, Carrie (April 2001). "The golden chain". F&SF. 100 (4): 43–53.		
2001	Love on a Stick	Richerson, Carrie. "Love on a Stick". In Griffith, Nicola & Pagel, Stephen (eds.). Bending the Landscape : Original Gay and Lesbian Writing Horror. The Overlook Press.		
2005	A Birth			
2005	A Game of Cards			
2006	The Warrior and the King			
2006	... With By Good Intentions			

Sheriff Doris Webster & the Returning Dead

- A Dying Breed, (1992)
- The Light at the End of the Day, (1993)
- The Quick and the Dead, (1997)

=== Poetry ===
Title	Year	First published	Reprinted/collected
STAR-crossed lovers	2006	Richerson, Carrie (Mar 2006). "STAR-crossed lovers". Aeon (Six).	
