= Arno Gruen =

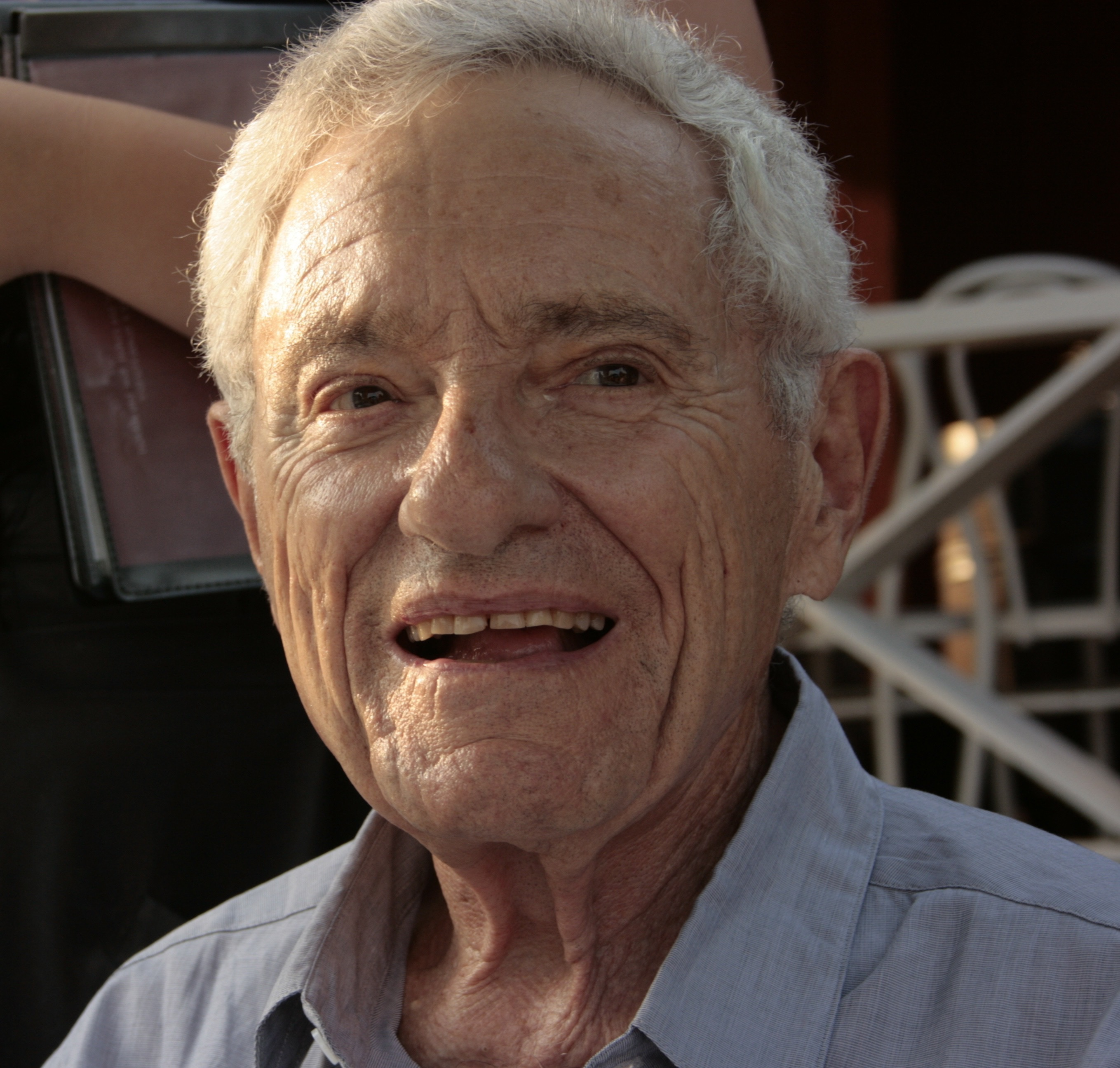
- Born: May 26, 1923; Berlin, Prussia, Weimar Republic
- Died: October 20, 2015 (aged 92); Zürich, Switzerland
- Scientific career
- Fields: Psychology

Arno Gruen (May 26, 1923 – October 20, 2015) was a Swiss-German psychologist and psychoanalyst.

== Biography ==
Gruen was born in Berlin in 1923, and emigrated to the United States as a child in 1936 when his parents, James and Rosa Gruen, fled Germany to save their lives. During the journey, Gruen celebrated his Bar Mitzvah in the Great Synagogue of Warsaw, on June 6, 1936.

He studied at the City College of New York. Then, after completing his graduate studies in psychology at New York University, he trained in psychoanalysis under Theodor Reik at one of the first psychoanalytic training centers for psychologists, the National Psychological Association for Psychoanalysis in New York City.

Gruen held many teaching posts, including seventeen years as professor of psychology at Rutgers University. From 1979 on, he lived and practiced in Switzerland. Widely published in German, his groundbreaking first book to be released in English, The Betrayal of the Self, was published by Grove Press in 1988.

Gruen's place in the history of psychology can be summarized as follows. According to Sigmund Freud, human beings are born with an innate tendency to destruction and violence; throughout his scholarly and clinical career, Prof. Gruen challenged that assumption, arguing instead that at the root of evil lies self-hatred, a rage originating in a self-betrayal that begins in childhood, when autonomy is surrendered in exchange for the "love" of those who wield power over us.

To share in that subjugating power, people create a false self, a pleasing-to-others image of themselves that springs from a powerful, deep-seated fear of being hurt, humiliated or abandoned. Gruen traced this pattern of over-adaptation, and the fate of those who resist the pressure to conform, through a number of case studies, sociological phenomena—from Nazism to Reaganomics—and literary works. The insanity of rage and numbness that this hyper-conformity produces, unfortunately, goes widely unrecognized precisely because it has become the cold, tough "realism" that modern society inculcates into its members and even admires.

Gruen warned, however, that escape from these patterns lies not simply in rebellion, for rebels often remain emotionally tied to the objects of their rebellion, but in the development of a personal autonomy and a relinquishing of all forms of self-numbing and self-deception. His elegant and far-reaching conclusion, elaborated in the books and essays listed below, is that while autonomy and authenticity are not easily attained, their absence proves catastrophic to both the individual and society as the embittered conformists seek new victims on whom to wreak violence and avenge their psychic wounds.

In 2001, Gruen was awarded the Geschwister-Scholl-Preis for his work, Der Fremde in uns.

== Works ==
- Autonomy and Identification: The Paradox of their Opposition, The International Journal of Psychoanalysis, Vol. 49 1968 (4), p. 648; 1968
- The Betrayal of the Self (New York: Grove Press, 1988). ISBN 0-8021-1017-7
- The Insanity of Normality: Understanding Human Destructiveness (Berkeley: Human Development Books, 2007). ISBN 978-0-9669908-4-3
