= Leslie What =

American author

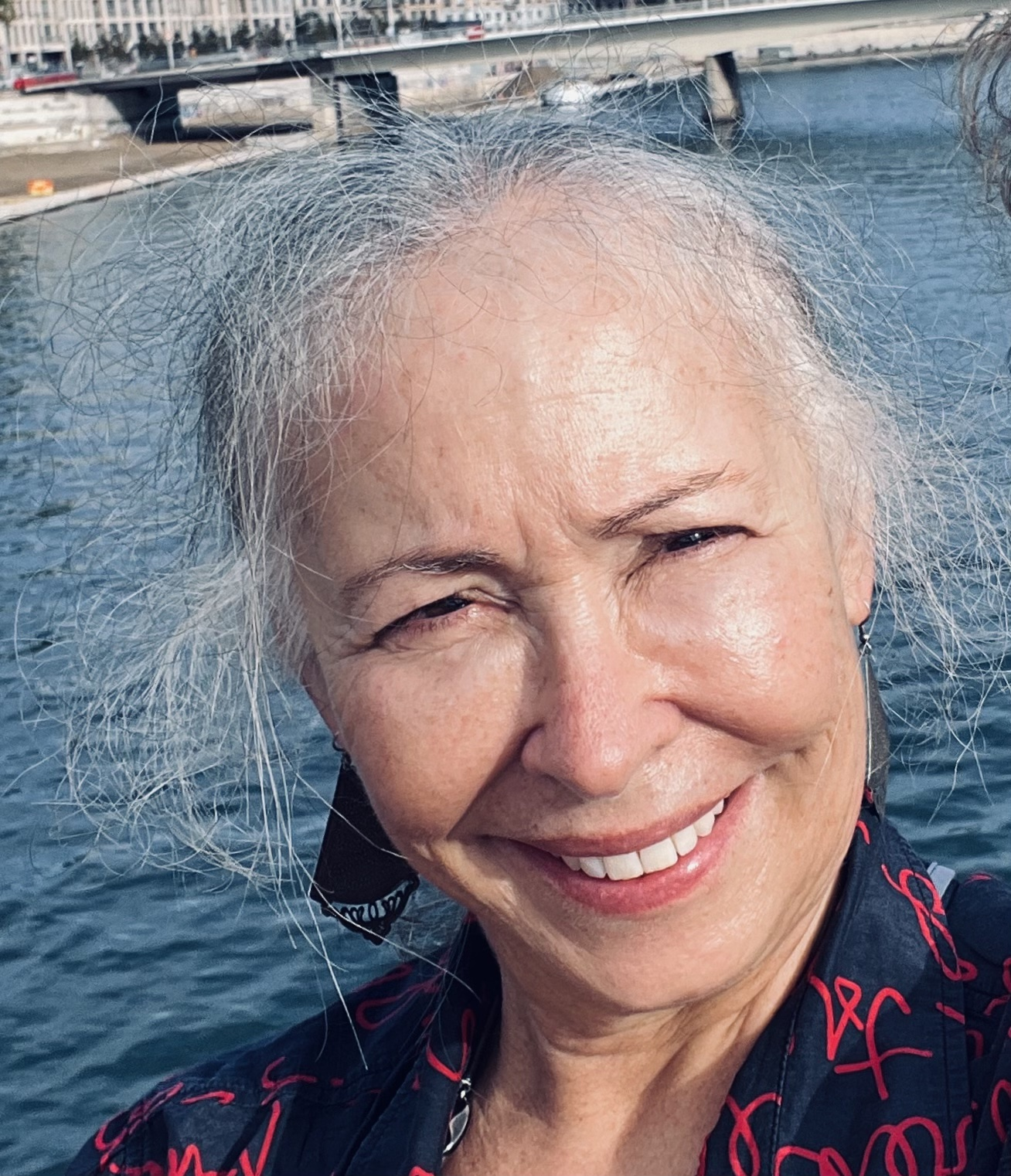
- What in 2022
- Born: Leslie Joyce Nelson; 1955 (age 69–70) Los Angeles, California, U.S.
- Occupation: Writer
- Education: Santa Ana College; California State University, Fullerton; Pacific University (MFA); Clarion Workshop
- Period: 1992-present
- Genre: Speculative Fiction

Website
- lesliewhat.com

Leslie What (born Leslie Joyce Nelson, 1955) is a Nebula Award-winning writer of speculative, literary fiction and nonfiction with three books and nearly 100 short stories and essays to her credit. An attendee of Clarion Workshop, she lives in Oregon. She won the Nebula in 1999 for the short story, The Cost of Doing Business, and in 2005, she was a finalist for the Nebula, along with Eileen Gunn, for their co-written novelette, Nirvana High.

== Biography ==
Leslie What was born Leslie Joyce Nelson in 1955 in Los Angeles. What's father deserted from the Red army shortly before the end of World War 2, escaping to the Western lines after his unit entered Berlin. He changed his name to Bill Nelson to shield his mother, What's grandmother, from possible reprisals for his desertion. What's mother was a German Holocaust survivor.

What grew up in Southern California, attending Santa Ana College and earning a certificate in Vocational Nursing. What also attended California State University Fullerton and received her MFA in Writing from Pacific University in 2006. What worked as a licensed vocational nurse and later volunteered with the Chevra kadisha. She has been an instructor at UCLA Extension in The Writers Program (http://www.uclaextension.edu/).

== Writing career ==
What adopted her current pseudonym around 1977, inspired by a friend who had dubbed herself "Karen Somebody." She attended the Clarion Workshop where she befriended speculative fiction author Eileen Gunn. She then moved to Oregon to be near science fiction authors and Clarion leaders Damon Knight and Kate Wilhelm. After a hiatus, during which she married and became a mother, What moved back to Oregon in October 1985, submitting a story she had spent two years writing to Knight for critique. A discouraging review from Knight caused What to stop writing for years until Knight reconnected with her and asked to see the manuscript again. Despite this delay in her career, What credits Knight and Wilhelm's tutelage with much of her success.

Her first published story, "King for a Day," came out in Asimov's Science Fiction in 1992. She has since published more than 70 speculative fiction stories, as well as a number of poems and essays, and her work has appeared in such places as Parabola, Witpunk, Bending the Landscape, Interfictions, The Mammoth Book of Tales from the Road, Sci Fiction, Best New Horror and other anthologies and magazines. Her non-speculative work has appeared in Utne Reader, Oregun 55, Perigree, Lilith, Calyx, The Clackamas Review, and True Love. She also writes on Jewish religious practices.

What's speculative work trends heavily away from traditional science fiction. Per the author:

"My pretensions are even greater than those who aspire to write in the literary tradition. I would say I belong to the tradition of satire. The majority of my work uses exaggeration and irony alongside tropes of the fantastic."

In addition to her short story and novelist career, What has been the senior nonfiction editor for "Silk Road, a literary crossroads" journal. She was the co-editor with R. A. Rycraft of Winter Tales: Women Write About Aging from Serving House Books. She was the first fiction editor for Phantom Drift: New Fabulism. Her work has been translated into German, Spanish, French, Russian, Hungarian, and Klingon.

== Book bibliography ==
- The Sweet and Sour Tongue (Borgo Press, 2000)

"A debut collection by Nebula Award-winning author Leslie What. These fourteen stories combine elements of magical realism, science fiction, fantasy, humor, horror, and pathos to '... blend realistic, traditional and absurd situations, her witty imagination inspiring laughter and horror.' -- Publishers Weekly"

- Nice girls do! (Foggy Window Books, 2001)

Published under the pseudonym Leslie Joyce, the book was never distributed as the publishing house went out of business.

- Olympic Games (Tachyon Publications, 2004)

An expansion of "The Goddess is Alive, And, Well, Living in New York City", published in Asimov's Science Fiction in 1998.

- Crazy Love (Wordcraft of Oregon, LLC, 2008)

Collection of 17 stories including the Nebula-winning The Cost of Doing Business.

== Awards ==
- Nebula Award for Best Short Story, The Cost of Doing Business, Amazing Stories (1999)
- Nebula Award for Best Novelette finalist, Nirvana High (2005)
- Oregon Book Award Ken Kesey Fiction award finalist, Crazy Love (2009)
