= Nontraditional Love =

2008 novel by Rafael Grugman

- Author: Rafael Grugman
- Language: English
- Genre: Dystopian fiction, dystopian speculative novel with a future LGBT-dominated world and elements of political satire, human rights
- Publisher: Liberty Publishing House, New York
- Publication date: 2008
- Publication place: United States
- Media type: Print (Paperback)
- ISBN: 978-9326863643

Nontraditional Love is a dystopian speculative novel written by Rafael Grugman and describes an alternative future where heterosexuality is outlawed. The novel was first published by Liberty Publishing House in November 2008 and nominated for the 2009 Rossica Translation Prize. Nontraditional Love combines satire with Orwellian themes.

== Plot ==
In the twenty-third century heterosexual love was illegal. Almost all people in the world are homosexual, and mixed-sex marriages are forbidden. The homosexual society is intolerant of dissidents, and intimacy between the sexes is rejected. World history and the classics of world literature has been rewritten in order to support the ideology of this world.

In the US, Robert Marcus and Liza start a secret relationship, but Liza breaks it off after a while. Robert decides to become gay, but during his first date his partner dies. The FBI begin an investigation and accuse Marcus of killing him.

After an ordeal of trials and public scrutiny Robert travels to the Netherlands, the last country that has not outlawed heterosexuality. From there he travels with to Switzerland to retrieve the contents of a safe deposit box.

Upon this return the Dutch government has been overthrown, and a new regime takes power, which also makes heterosexuality illegal.

== Publication history ==
The novel was first published in New York by Liberty Publishing House in 2008. The book was translated from Russian by Geoffrey Carlson.

The second edition was published under the title: The Twenty Third Century: Nontraditional Love by Strelbytskyy Multimedia Publishing in 2017.

In Russia, the novel was first published in Moscow in 2020 under the title "Запретная любовь. Forbidden Love" by Rodina in 2020. In the Russian Federation, this book was banned and withdrawn from sale after the State Duma adopted a law in 2022 aimed against LGBT people, banning "propaganda of non-traditional sexual relations and pedophilia", Article 282.2 of the Criminal Code of the Russian Federation. After the Supreme Court of the Russian Federation declared the LGBT movement an "extremist organization" on November 30, 2023, bookstores and libraries removed books that fell under this law.

== Critical reception ==
Debbie Pope writes in March 2016, Issue 8 of Lateral Magazine: The freedom of a genre: Sexuality in speculative fiction: 'In another twist of today's society, Nontraditional Love by Rafael Grugman (2008) puts together an upside-down society where heterosexuality is outlawed, and homosexuality is the norm. A 'traditional' family unit consists of two dads with a surrogate mother. Alternatively, two mothers, one of whom bears a child. In a nod to the always-progressive Netherlands, this country is the only country progressive enough to allow opposite sex marriage. This is perhaps the most obvious example of cognitive estrangement. It puts the reader in the shoes of the oppressed by modelling an entire world of opposites around a fairly "normal" everyday heterosexual protagonist. A heterosexual reader would not only be able to identify with the main character, but be immersed in a world as oppressive and bigoted as the real world has been for homosexuals and the queer community throughout history.

Mariano Martín Rodríguez, Doctor in Philology and a member of the research group on utopias and future history HISTOPIA (Universidad Autónoma de Madrid) wrote in (Anti)Gay Utopian Fiction in English and Romance Languages: an Overview: 'We can doubt whether the celebration of a hypothetically persecuted heterosexuality as a symbol of the right to difference in later gay dystopias... Among them, there is a relatively recent one, written in Russian and translated into English in 2008, Rafael Grugman's Nontraditional Love. As it is the case in earlier examples of homosexual domination, at least from "The Crooked Man" onwards, the heterosexual male hero-victim in this novel must come to terms with the fact that he is a member of a rejected minority, from which he and his female partner must hide their love through family arrangements with fellow-minded and orientated couples. In this future Earth, a global accident has turned most people from heterosexual to homosexual, as well as their descendants, while former homosexuals have become heterosexuals, bringing about a full reversal. Biological maternity had to be replaced by gestational surrogacy for both gay and lesbian couples, now forming the majority...

Regarding Grugman's heterosexist 'traditional' perspective, it may be of interest to compare Nontraditional Love with an earlier lesbian narrative, Cy Jung's Hétéro par-ci, homo par le rat (1999), which is set in a fictional world similar to the one imagined by Grugman...'

In Rodríguez's opinion, 'Consciously or not, Grugman's narrative echoes current discourses against gay and lesbian assertiveness underlying legislation enacted to prevent any alleged gay proselytizism... Homosexuality is thus presented as a threat to society at large, and Grugman just turns this threat into reality in his dystopia. At any rate, Grugman offers a late specimen of anti-gay utopia in a period when homosexuality had virtually disappeared from the utopian genre, except for a few appropriations of it by the gays themselves, after the long silence in the closet.'

"Politically, I'd give this book five stars for what it attempts and accomplishes. However, as an overall enjoyment experience, I'd have to give this book four stars. While I was pretty gripped to the story, I wasn't really emotionally involved enough, which is my requirement for giving five stars. But if you like Kafka's "The Trial" and Terry Gilliam's film "Brasil", this is definitely the book for you."
