= Keith Hartman =

American writer of speculative fiction

- Born: 1966 (age 59–60); Huntsville, Alabama, U.S.
- Education: Princeton University; London School of Economics; Duke University (PhD)
- Occupation: Writer
- Writing career
- Genre: Speculative fiction

Keith Hartman (born 1966) is an American writer of speculative fiction and a self-described "struggling film-maker". He has also written non-fiction books on gay and lesbian issues. He has been nominated a number of times for the Gaylactic Spectrum Awards and Lambda Literary Award for LGBT literature.

== Biography ==
Hartman was born in Huntsville, Alabama. He graduated from Princeton University, then went on to study at the London School of Economics, then started a PhD in finance at Duke University. Sometime around his third year of the finance program, he decided to change careers and become a writer.

You Should Meet My Son!, Hartman's first feature film, appeared at LGBT film festivals in 2011 and is slated for DVD release later in the year.

== Works ==
=== Fiction ===
- The Gumshoe, The Witch, & The Virtual Corpse (1999)
- Gumshoe Gorilla - sequel. (2002)
- The Buried Sky (2011)

=== Non-fiction ===
- Congregations In Conflict - an examination of churches split over the issue of homosexuality.

== Reception ==
The Magazine of Fantasy & Science Fiction reviewer Charles de Lint reported that "The Gumshoe, the Witch, and the Virtual Corpse is, like its title, a somewhat busy book, but there's enough payoff in characterization, story and ideas to make the trip through its pages a real pleasure."

== Awards ==
=== The Gumshoe, The Witch, & The Virtual Corpse ===
- Chosen as one of the eight best mysteries of 1999 by The Drood Review of Mysteries.
- Winner of Two Gaylactic Spectrum Awards ("Best Novel" and "People's Choice")
- Nominated for two Lambda Awards ("Best Science Fiction / Fantasy Book" and "Best Men's Mystery".)

=== Gumshoe Gorilla ===
- Nominated for a Lambda Award ("Best Science Fiction / Fantasy / Horror Book".)

=== Congregations In Conflict ===
- 1996 Lambda Award Nominee
- Number 2 on The Advocate's Bestseller List.
