= Simon Sheppard (writer) =

American writer (1948–2021)

- Sheppard and his writings in 2010
- Born: 1948; New York City, New York, United States
- Died: February 12, 2021 (age 72); San Francisco, California, United States
- Occupations: Author; editor

Simon Sheppard (1948 – February 12, 2021) was a writer of gay erotica and a sex-advice columnist from San Francisco. He is the author of many books of gay sex writing, including Man on Man: The Best of Simon Sheppard, Sodomy!, Jockboys, Kinkorama: Dispatches From the Front Lines of Perversion, In Deep, and Sex Parties 101. He was also the editor of Homosex: 60 Years of Gay Erotica, winner of the 2007 Lambda Literary Award for LGBT erotica; the anthology Leathermen; and is the coeditor of the anthologies Rough Stuff and Roughed Up.

Sheppard's work is wide-ranging, often combining history, philosophy, and culture — high and low — with hardcore sex. His first book, Hotter Than Hell and Other Stories, won the Erotic Authors Association Award for Best Collection of the Year, and the title story of In Deep was shortlisted for the Rauxa Prize for Erotic Fiction. His work has also appeared in over 300 anthologies and magazines, including many editions of Best Gay Erotica and The Best American Erotica. He wrote the syndicated column "Sex Talk," and the online columns "Perv" and "Notes of a Cranky Old Fag." The online serial "The Dirty Boys' Club," which he wrote for OutPersonals, was published as a novel in 2012.

He also co-curated and co-hosted, with Carol Queen and Lori Selke, the San Francisco performance series Perverts Put Out! founded by publisher Bill Brent. Sheppard was openly gay and kinky, and was active in the queer artistic, political and AIDS-activist communities. With his husband William, he lived for years in San Francisco, where San Francisco magazine dubbed him "our erotica king."

Sheppard died of kidney cancer on February 12, 2021, aged 72 in San Francisco, California.

== Bibliography ==
- Sheppard, Simon; Christian, M (2000), Rough Stuff : Tales of Gay Men, Sex, and Power, Alyson Books, ISBN 978-1-55583-520-0
- Sheppard, Simon (2001), Hotter Than Hell and Other Stories, Alyson Books, ISBN 978-1-55583-596-5
- Sheppard, Simon (2003), Kinkorama: Dispatches From the Front Lines of Perversion, Alyson Books, ISBN 978-1-55583-634-4
- Sheppard, Simon (2004), In Deep and Other Stories, Alyson Books, ISBN 978-1-55583-804-1, OCLC 56655313
- Sheppard, Simon (2005), Sex Parties 101, Alyson Books, ISBN 978-1-55583-867-6
- Sheppard, Simon (2007), Homosex: Sixty Years of Gay Erotica, Carroll & Graf, ISBN 978-0-7867-1755-2
- Sheppard, Simon (2010), Sodomy!, Lethe Press, ISBN 978-1-59021-031-4
- Sheppard, Simon (2012), The Dirty Boys' Club, Lethe Press, ISBN 978-1-59021-370-4
- Sheppard, Simon (2013), Man on Man: The Best of Simon Sheppard, Renaissance eBooks, ISBN 978-1-49124-264-3
- Sheppard, Simon (2013), Jockboys, Riverdale Avenue Books, ASIN B00DXY3PI4
- Sheppard, Simon (2014), Jockboys 2, Riverdale Avenue Books, ASIN B00QZ8ZHB8
