= Shariann Lewitt =

American novelist (born 1954)

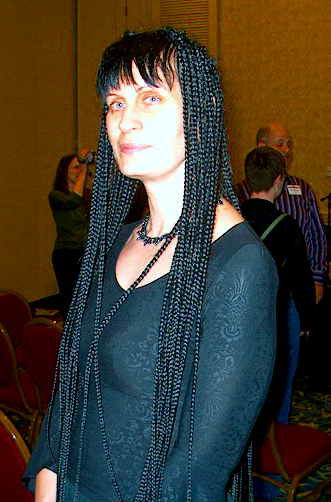
- Shariann Lewitt at Readercon, July 2007
- Born: 1954 (age 71–72); New York City, U.S.
- Occupations: Writer, lecturer
- Writing career
- Pen name: S. N. Lewitt, Gordon Kendall, Nina Harper
- Period: 1985s–present
- Genre: science fiction

Shariann Lewitt or S.N. Lewitt (born 1954) is an American author, specializing in science fiction. Lewitt is a lecturer at the Massachusetts Institute of Technology. In 2002, her story was included in Mary Flanagan's "Reload: Rethinking Women + Cyberculture". That collection won the Susan Koppelman Award given by the Joint Women's Caucus of Popular Culture/American Culture.

== Publications ==
- First and Final Rites (1984, Ace)
- White Wing (1985, Tor) with Susan Shwartz (as Gordon Kendall)
- Angel at Apogee (1987, Ace) (as S. N. Lewitt)
- Blind Justice (1991, Ace) (as S. N. Lewitt)
- Cybernetic Jungle (1992, Ace) (as S. N. Lewitt)
- Songs of Chaos (1993, Ace) (as S. N. Lewitt)
- Memento Mori (1995, Tor)
- Interface Masque (1997, Tor)
- Rebel Sutra (2000, Tor)

=== U.S.S.A. ===
- U.S.S.A. Book 2 (1987, Avon) (as S. N. Lewitt)
- U.S.S.A. Book 4 (1987, Avon) (as S. N. Lewitt)

=== Cyberstealth ===
- Cyberstealth (1989, Ace) (as S. N. Lewitt)
- Dancing Vac (1990, Ace) (as S. N. Lewitt)

=== Star Trek: Voyager ===
- Cybersong (1996) (as S. N. Lewitt)

=== Succubus In The City ===
- Succubus in the City (2008, Del Rey) (as Nina Harper)
- Succubus Takes Manhattan (2008, Del Rey) (as Nina Harper)
