= Rafael Grugman =

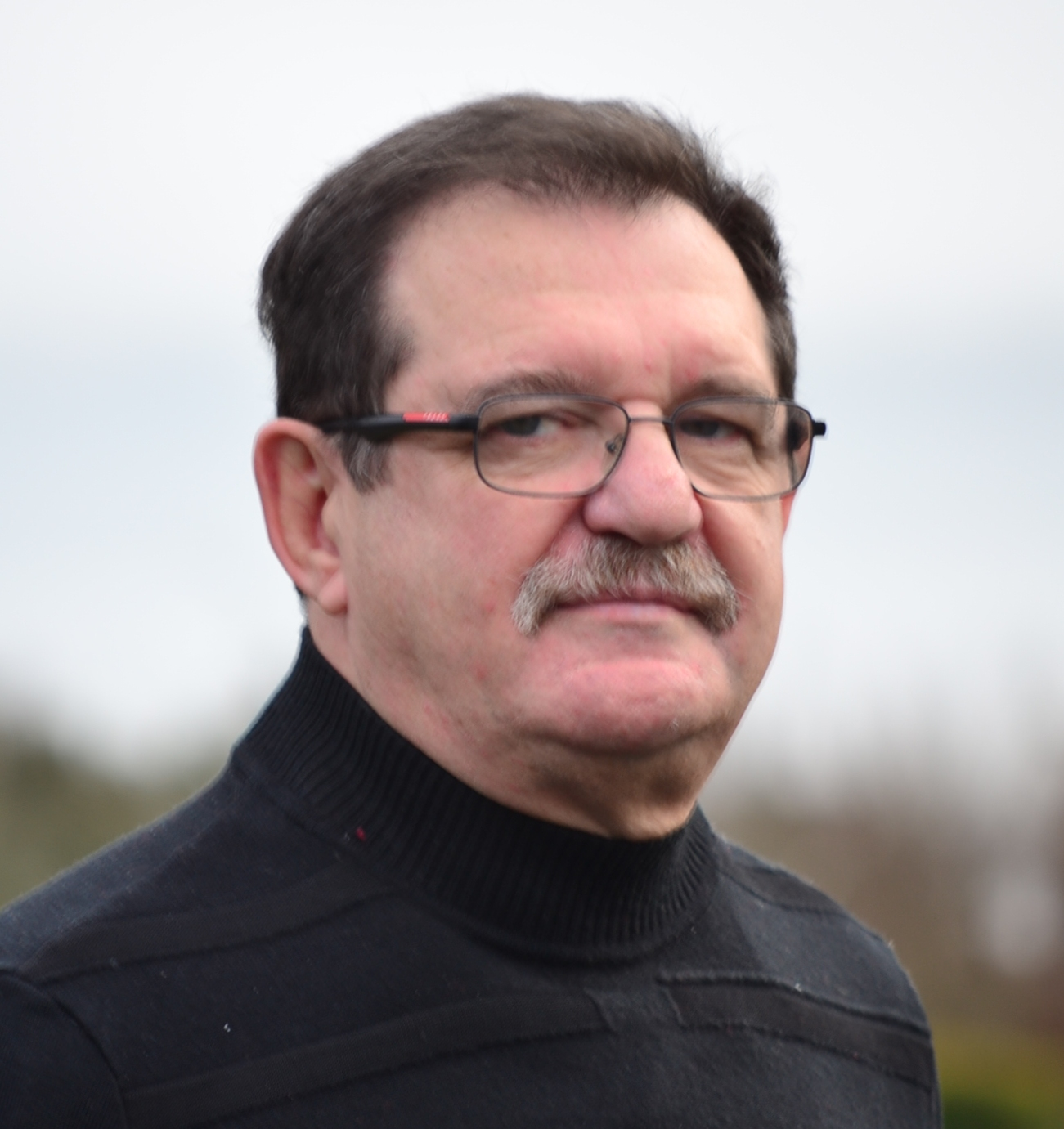
- Rafael Grugman
- Born: 16 October 1948 (age 78); Odesa, USSR
- Citizenship: USSR (1948-1991), Ukraine (1991-1996), United States (1996-present)
- Occupations: Writer, journalist, college educator

Rafael Abramovich Grugman (Russian: Рафаэль Абрамович Гругман; born 16 October 1948) is the American and Ukrainian writer, journalist, engineer, programmer and college educator.

== Biography ==
Rafael Grugman was born in Odesa, Ukraine, USSR and graduated from Novosibirsk Electrotechnical Institute (NETI) in Russia (now Novosibirsk State Technical University, NSTU).

During student years he worked as a journalist for several Novosibirsk newspapers. In 1971 he returned to Odesa to work as an engineer for more than twenty years, authoring and contributing to more than 50 patents and scientific articles that were published in Moscow technical magazines.

In the mid-1980s, during the years of social and political reforms in the USSR, known as the Perestroika, he again becomes a journalist, publishing his work in leading newspapers in Odesa, and conducted interviews with diplomats and military and political figures. He was the first editor of the Jewish newspaper Ha-Meletz (Russian: Ха-Мелиц), published in Odesa after the collapse of the USSR.

He lives in the United States since 1996. He has held various positions working as a programmer, journalist and writer. Presently, he is teaching at a local college in New York.

Rafael Grugman the author of fiction and non-fiction books that were published in Russia, Ukraine, United States and Israel. The dystopian novel Nontraditional Love was published by Liberty Publishing House in November 2008 and nominated for the 2009 Rossica Translation Prize (London, 2009).

== Fiction book published in USA (translated from Russian) ==
- Nontraditional Love — New York: Liberty Publishing House, 2008
- The Twenty Third Century: Nontraditional Love, — Strelbytskyy Multimedia Publishing, 2017
- Napoleon's Great-Great-Grandson Speaks — Strelbytskyy Multimedia Publishing, 2017
- The Messiah Who Might Have Been. I Was Churchill's Mistress — Strelbytskyy Multimedia Publishing, 2018

== Fiction books ==
- Bride of the Sea (Невеста моря ) — Ukraine, Odesa: Title, 1994
- Borya, get out from the sea (Боря, выйди с моря) — Ukraine, Odesa: Southwest, 1995
- Nuzhna mne vasha farshirovannaya ryba (Нужна мне ваша фаршированная рыба) — Ukraine, Odesa: Printing House, 2004
- Borya, get out from the sea – 2. Odesa Tales (Боря, выйди с моря — 2. Одесские рассказы) — Russia, Moscow, Rodina, 2019
- Запретная любовь. Forbidden Love — Russia, Moscow, Rodina, 2020
- Testament of Mazepa, Prince of the Holy Roman Empire, revealed in Odesa to the great-great-grandson of Napoleon Bonaparte Завещание Мазепы, князя Священной Римской империи, открывшееся в Одессе праправнуку Бонапарта — М.: Родина, 2021. — Russia, Moscow, Rodina, 2021

== Nonfiction books ==
- Vladimir Jabotinsky, the indomitable Samson (Владимир Жаботинский, неукротимый Самсон) — Israel, Isradon, 2010
- Soviet square: Stalin-Khrushchev-Beria-Gorbachev (Советский квадрат: Сталин-Хрущев-Берия-Горбачев) — Russia, Piter, 2011
- Svetlana Alliluyeva. The five lives (Светлана Аллилуева. Пять жизней) — Russia, Phoenix, 2012
- Jabotinsky and Ben-Gurion: The Right and Left Poles of Israel (Жаботинский и Бен-Гурион: правый и левый полюсы Израиля) — Russia, Phoenix, 2014
- The Death of Stalin: All the Versions - And One More (Смерть Сталина: все версии. И ещё одна) — Russia, Moscow, Eksmo, Algorithm, 2016
- Svetlana Alliluyeva to Pasternak. "I've crossed my Rubicon" (Светлана Аллилуева — Пастернаку. “Я перешагнула мой Рубикон” — Russia, Moscow, Algorithm, 2018
- Woman and War: From Love to Hate (Женщина и война. От любви до насилия) — Russia, Moscow, Algorithm, 2018
- The Death of Stalin. All the Versions And One More (Смерть Сталина. Все версии и ещё одна) — Russia, Moscow, Eksmo, Rodina, 2021

== Nonfiction books published in Ukraine ==
- Військові злочини проти жінок. The War Crimes Against Women — Ukraine, Kharkiv, Fabula, 2023
- Злочини проти жінок під час війни — Ukraine, Kharkiv, Fabula, 2024

== Notes ==
- Interview with Rafael Grugman for an Israeli magazine "We are here", in Russian
- Interview with Rafael Grugman for an Israeli magazine "Kol-Ha-Uma", in Russian
