= Mark W. Tiedemann =

American novelist (born 1954)

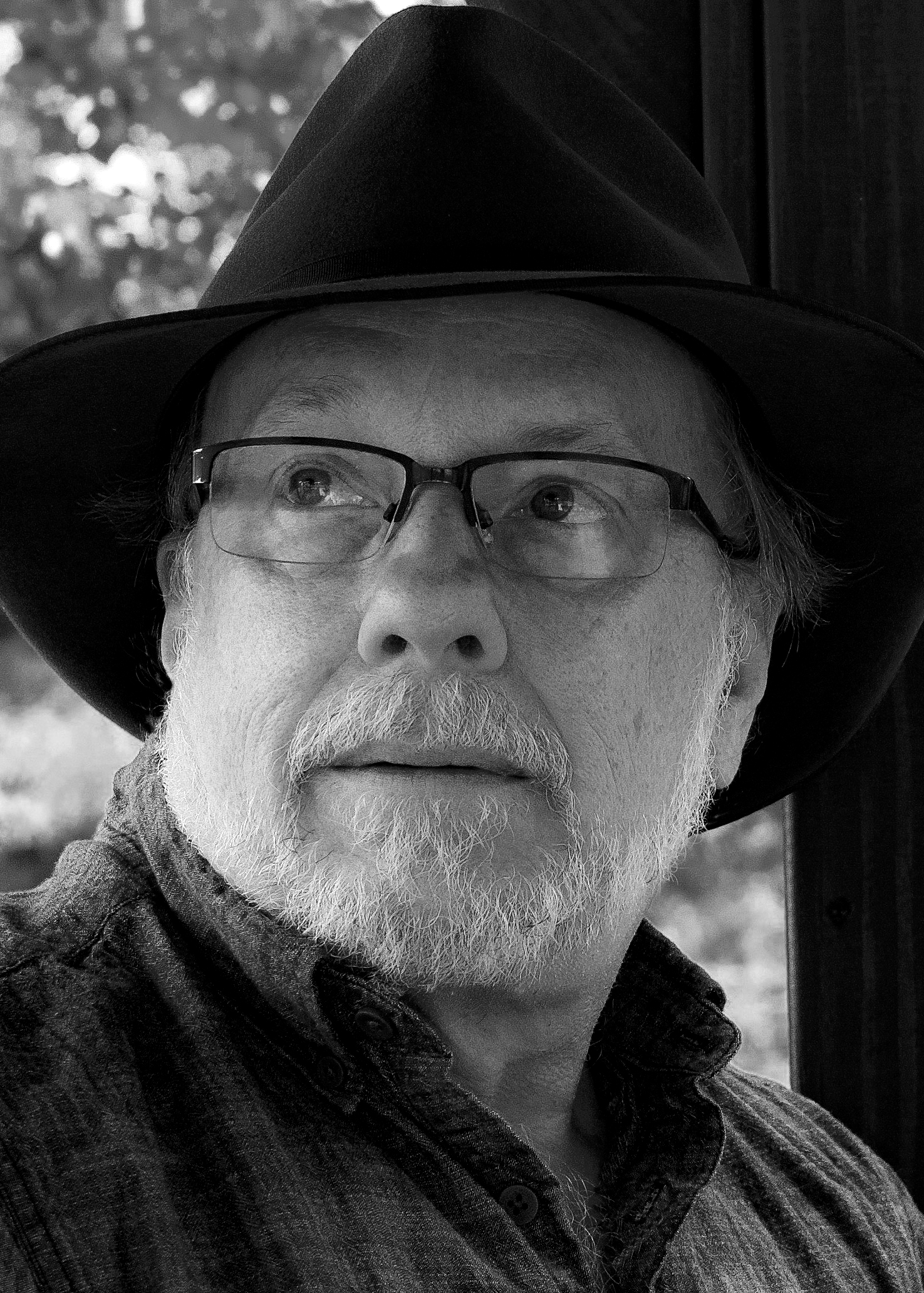
- Tiedemann in 2022
- Born: 1954 (age 71–72); St. Louis, Missouri, U.S.
- Education: Clarion Workshop
- Occupation: Author
- Writing career
- Genres: Science fiction; detective fiction
- Website: www.marktiedemann.com

Mark W. Tiedemann (born 1954 in St. Louis, Missouri) is an American science fiction and detective fiction author. He has written novels set in Isaac Asimov's Robot universe, and within his own original universe, known as the Secantis Sequence.

In spring 2005 he was named president of the Missouri Center for the Book, which is the Missouri state adjunct program to the Library of Congress Center for the Book.

== Biography ==
Born to Henry and Donna Tiedemann, Mark W. Tiedemann grew up an only child. He wrote several short stories, a few of which he submitted to major SF magazines of the day such as Galaxy, Worlds of If, The Magazine of Fantasy & Science Fiction, though none were accepted for publication.

Upon entering high school, he discovered photography, which became his primary career. Writing still attracted his interest though, and in 1978 he completed a novel, Random Factor, though it was never published. He then wrote several more novels. In 1980, he met his future partner, Donna, who encouraged him to pursue his passion for writing. He met with limited success, with three short stories published before 1988, in small press magazines, the most notable of which was Reveleven, published by Scott Edelman in Edelman's magazine Last Wave in 1986. Tiedemann then applied to and was accepted by the Clarion SF Writers Workshop In the summer of 1988, he attended Clarion with instructors Tim Powers, Lisa Goldstein, Samuel R. Delany, Kim Stanley Robinson, Kate Wilhelm, and Damon Knight. That workshop produced writers such as Kelley Eskridge, Nicola Griffith, and Peg Kerr, and within a year, Tiedemann began selling short stories. His first major sale was Targets, sold to Gardner Dozois, editor of Asimov's Science Fiction Magazine. Several more quickly followed.

His next novel, Compass Reach, was shortlisted for the Philip K. Dick Award. This first in his Secantis Sequence, the novel approaches an interstellar empire from the perspective of the underclass, the main characters being so-called Freeriders---essentially hobos who stow away on translight ships and maintain a loose but widespread community. The novel deals with questions of class, material wealth, identity boundaries, and control, in the face of an expanding human presence that must deal with truly alien species. The novel ends with the principle polity, the Pan Humana, descending into civil war. The next novel in the series, Metal of Night, deals with that civil war, but from the standpoint of the victims and deals with issues of costs and consequence. The third Secantis novel, Peace and Memory, takes place some 80 years after the civil war and considers questions of self-determination, identity, and the parameters of appropriate political growth.

These three novels, plus a number of short stories, are constructed in such a way as to offer multiple possibilities for future stories, none of which share common characters, only a common background. Meisha Merlin Publishing published the novels.

Another novel, Remains, from BenBella Publishing, is separate from his Secantis universe. Remains is more of a "planetary romance", the action taking place within the confines of the Solar System. The novel was shortlisted for the James Tiptree Jr. Award in 2006.

While working for the independent bookstore Left Bank Books (10 years), he composed the historical novel Granger's Crossing, which is set during the Revolutionary War era in frontier St. Louis. Amphorae Publishing released it in spring of 2023 under their Blank Slate Press imprint.

Upon retiring in 2022, he returned to short fiction, with a string of sales to Analog SF among others.

== Bibliography ==
=== Novels ===
The Secantis Sequence:

- Compass Reach (2001)
- Metal of Night (2002)
- Peace & Memory (2003)
- Other Ways: Three Tales From The Secant (chapbook) (2005)

Isaac Asimov's Robot Mystery series:

1. Asimov's Mirage (2000)
2. Asimov's Chimera (2001)
3. Asimov's Aurora (2002)

Terminator series:

- Terminator 2: Hour of the Wolf (2004)

Stand-alones:

- Extensions (chapbook) (1999)
- Realtime (2001)
- Of Stars And Shadows (2004)
- Remains (2005)
- Diva (chapbook) (2005)

=== Short fiction ===
Collections

- Tiedemann, Mark. Gravity box and other stories. Walrus Publishing.
- Tiedemann, Mark. Logic of Departure. Yard Dog Press.
