= Dead Silence (novel) =

2022 science fiction horror novel by S.A. Barnes

- Author: S.A. Barnes
- Audio read by: Lauren Ezzo
- Language: English
- Subject: Sci-fi horror
- Publisher: Tor Nightfire, Macmillan Audio
- Publication date: 2022
- Publication place: United States
- Media type: Print (hardback, paperback), ebook, audiobook
- Pages: 352 pages
- ISBN: 1250819997

Dead Silence is a 2022 science fiction horror novel by American author Stacey Kade, writing under the pen name of S. A. Barnes.

== Synopsis ==
The novel follows Claire, a team leader who worked aboard a Verux repair ship servicing communication beacons in the outermost regions of explored space alongside her crewmates Voller, Kane, Lourdes, and Nysus. A month prior she was discovered aboard an escape pod with a skull fracture and no memory of how she got aboard the pod. Her last memories were of her and her crew discovering the Aurora, a luxury cruise spaceship that had gone missing twenty years previously, during its maiden voyage. While being interviewed by two Verux corporate investigators, Max and Reed, Claire details how her crew had found and investigated the Aurora, hoping to claim its lucrative salvage rights. Once aboard the ship they discovered that the guests and crew had died in a variety of gruesome ways. Footage discovered from a reality show filmed aboard the Aurora showed that the deceased had experienced visual and auditory hallucinations, as well as paranoia. Claire further tells them that her crew had begun to experience these same effects, leading to Voller killing himself. She had fractured her skull while trying to stop him, resulting in her retaining no memory beyond a vision of seeing Lourdes's ghost hovering over Claire and Lourdes's corpse. Reed is incredulous, as he is intent on forcing Claire to confess to murdering her crew out of greed. While narrating the events to the investigators it becomes clear that Claire can see ghosts, something she had always been in denial about but finally admits to herself is genuine.

Max informs Claire that Verux is sending himself, Reed, and Claire to investigate the Aurora and retrieve the bodies. Once aboard, Claire discovers that Kane is still alive, as he had sequestered himself in a makeshift padded room that he claims dampens vibrations he says causes hallucinations. As she talks to him Max has one of his security teams lock her, Reed, and Kane inside the room. To her horror, Claire learns the truth about the events aboard the Aurora. Twenty years prior Verux had paid one of the crew members to sabotage the maiden voyage so that the owning company would go bankrupt, allowing Verux to buy them out. To accomplish this the crew member was given a vibration device intended to merely cause headaches and mild distress, however these effects were dramatically amplified by the new alloys used to build the ship. The amplified device instead caused severe hallucinations and, it is implied, the limited ability to see ghosts. Max was sent to retrieve the device and then destroy the ship. Reed and Claire were to be left aboard; Reed to make the destruction believable as Verux would be losing a valued employee and Claire, who would serve as scapegoat.

Claire manages to escape the room with Reed and Kane. With no easy path to escape, Claire decides to further amplify the device's abilities by removing the sound dampeners, expecting that this would allow them to sneak aboard Max's ship. This instead causes Reed to fully snap and attack Claire. She and Kane manage to evade him by fleeing to their repair ship, which is still aboard the Aurora. Realizing what she has done, Max seeks out Claire and the two have a final standoff. She manages to get the upper hand when Reed appears and attacks Max, who is forced to shoot him. Claire deliberately causes a hull breach, resulting in Max's death. She herself almost dies in the process but is saved by Kane, who reels her in to the repair ship.

The book skips forward two years. Kane and Claire were rescued by a salvage ship, where they broadcast their story online. They manage to gain the full salvage pay for the Aurora from Verux, as part of a PR move to improve their now damaged image. Claire expects that they will still eventually go bankrupt, particularly as they now face several lawsuits. The book ends with Claire and Kane becoming a couple and opening a transport company together.

== Development ==
Inspirations for the book came from the Alien franchise and the films Ghost Ship and Event Horizon, as well as the sinking of the RMS Titanic. Kade was also intrigued by the idea of setting the novel in two different points in time, both before and after the character Claire was rescued, as she liked the idea that authorities would see her as an unreliable narrator due to the existence of conflicting evidence. She chose to set the novel in space, as "space is just an excellent setting for amping up tension and making the situation more difficult for our characters. If there’s a serial killer or evil clown in your basement, you can at least try to run, but in space? On a ship? There’s nowhere to go."

Kade had to restart the novel "about six or seven different times to find the right way in" and that "for me, trial and error plays a large role in writing, especially at the beginning of a book." She initially included scenes written from the point of view of the man interviewing Claire, Reed, but chose to eliminate these scenes as "It’s Claire’s story, not his".

== Publication ==
Dead Silence was first published in hardback and ebook format in the United States on February 8, 2022, through Tor Nightfire. A paperback edition was released the following year on January 24, via Tor Trade. The book has received publication in Germany and Australia.

An audiobook adaptation narrated by Lauren Ezzo was released alongside the hardback edition via Macmillan Audio.

== Reception ==
Critical reception for Dead Silence has been positive and Locus included it on their list of the best horror novels of 2022. Gabino Iglesias reviewed the novel for Locus, praising it for its atmosphere, setting, and for "simultaneously exploring the role that past trauma and PTSD can play when someone who suffers from them is exposed to fresh trauma." Cemetery Dance also posted a review, stating that it was "A genre mash-up that easily captivates its audience but struggles to utilize that up-front investment to maintain interest." The novel has also received praise for its audiobook adaption.

== See also ==
- Dead Space, a 2021 sci-fi horror novel by Kali Wallace
