= Stacey Kade =

American author

- Education: Valparaiso University
- Occupation: Author
- Spouse: Greg Klemstein
- Writing career
- Genres: Paranormal romance, fiction, Sci Fi, Fantasy
- Notable works: The Ghost and The Goth Trilogy
- Website: www.staceykade.com

Stacey Kade (also known as Stacey Klemstein and S. A. Barnes) is an American author from Chicago, Illinois.

== Career ==
Kade is the author of The Ghost and the Goth, Queen of the Dead, and Body & Soul. In 2011 her book Queen of the Dead was nominated for a YALSA award for "Best Fiction for Young Adults". She announced in February 2011 that she begin writing a new book series called Project Paper Doll. The first book Project Paper Doll: THE RULES was released in 2013. The second book Project Paper Doll: THE HUNT was released in 2014. the third book Project Paper Doll: The Trials was released in 2015.

In a 2024 interview with Library Journal, Kade stated that she works as a high school librarian in Illinois.

== Personal life ==
Growing up her parents were a minister and a music teacher. Before becoming an author she worked as a corporate copywriter.

== Books ==
=== As Stacey Klemstein ===
- The Silver Spoon. Echelon Press. 2007. ISBN 978-1590805480.
- Eye of the Beholder. Echelon Press. 2008. ISBN 978-1590806012.

=== As Stacey Kade ===
- The Ghost and the Goth. New York: Disney-Hyperion. 2010. ISBN 9781423124870.
- Queen of the Dead. New York: Disney-Hyperion. 2011. ISBN 9781423135265.
- Body and Soul. New York: Disney-Hyperion. 2012. ISBN 9781423135272.
- Project Paper Doll: The Rules. New York: Disney-Hyperion. 2013. ISBN 9781423153283.
- Project Paper Doll: The Hunt. New York: Disney-Hyperion. 2014. ISBN 9781423153290.
- Project Paper Doll: The Trials. New York: Disney-Hyperion. 2015. ISBN 9781423184638.
- Bitter Pill. Stacey Kade Books. 2013. ISBN 9780988585942.
- 738 Days. New York: Tor Books. 2016. ISBN 9780765380401.
- For This Life Only. Simon & Schuster BFYR. 2016. ISBN 9781481432481.
- Starlight Nights. Forge Books. 2018. ISBN 9780765380425.
- Finding Felicity. Simon & Schuster Books For Young Readers. 2018. ISBN 9781481464253.

=== As S. A. Barnes ===
- Dead Silence. Tor Nightfire. 2022. ISBN 9781250819994.
- Ghost Station. Tor Nightfire. 2024. ISBN 1250884926.
- Cold Eternity. Tor Nightfire. 2025. ISBN 9781250884954.

==== Children of the Old Ones ====
1. Death's Daughter. Bramble. 2026. ISBN 9781250388483
