= Ellen Kushner bibliography =

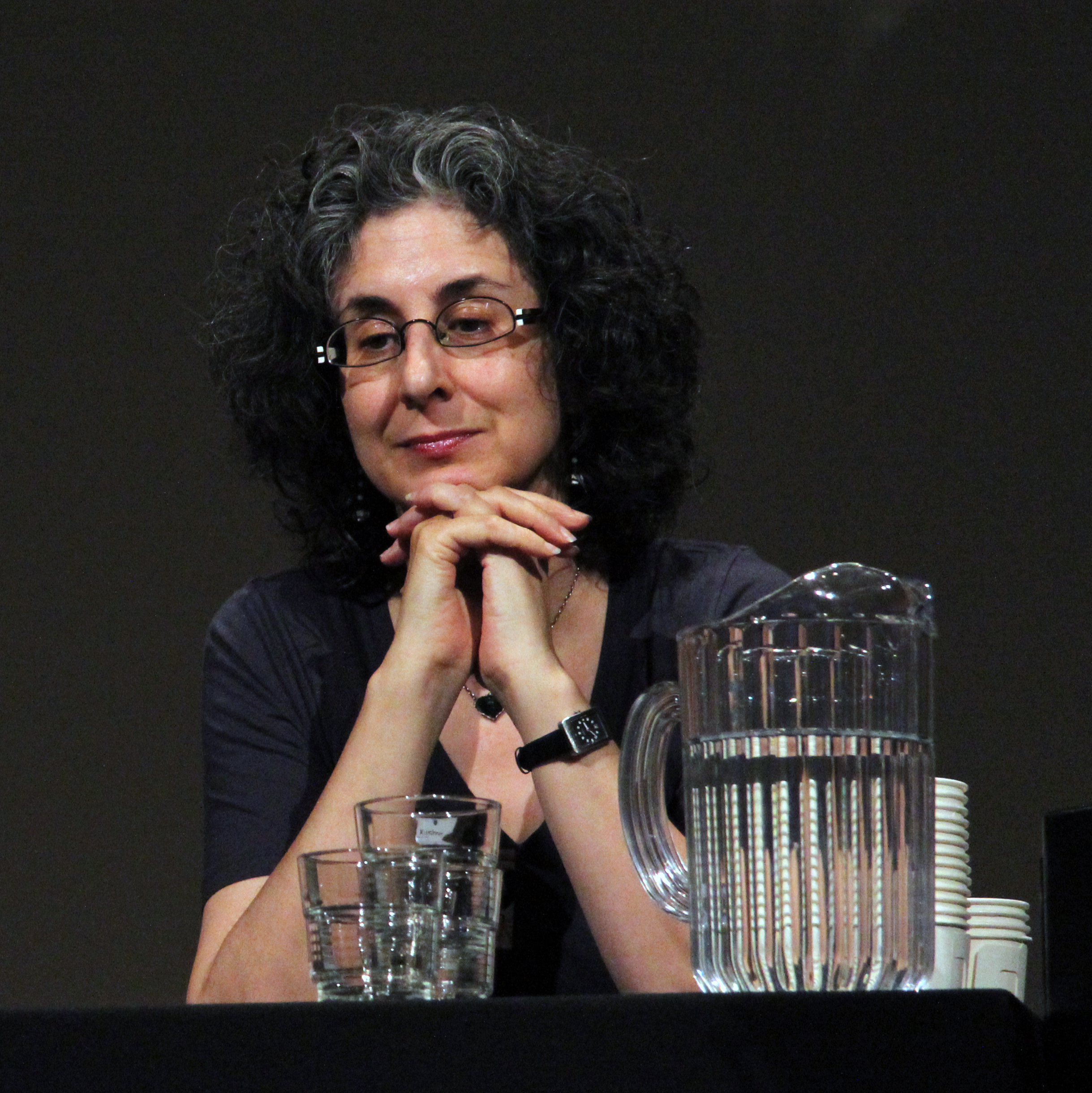
- Kushner in 2010
- Novels↙: 4
- Stories↙: 43
- Poems↙: 2
- Children's books↙: 6
- Non-fiction↙: 2
- Edited volumes↙: 4

Ellen Kushner (born 1955) is an American editor and author of fantasy fiction for adults and children. She has published four edited volumes, four novels, two poems, and more than forty short stories. Kushner's first publication was as the editor of Basilisk (1980), an anthology of fantasy stories and poems, and in 1981 she published her first short story, "The Unicorn Masque". Donald G. Keller described "The Unicorn Masque" as "a harbinger of the fantasy of manners", a fantasy subgenre in which Kushner would become a major figure.

Much of the critical attention dedicated to Kushner's work has focused on the novels in her Riverside series, beginning with Swordspoint in 1987. Swordspoint, Kushner's first novel, is set in a fictional 18th-century city and contains no fantastical elements beyond "the structure of the depicted society, which has no historical analogue". Swordspoint was inducted into the Gaylactic Spectrum Awards Hall of Fame in 2000 and is considered a central text in the fantasy of manners subgenre. Swordspoint was followed by two sequel novels: The Fall of the Kings in 2002, co-written with Delia Sherman, and The Privilege of the Sword in 2006, which earned Kushner a Locus Award for Best Fantasy Novel.

In 1990, Kushner also published a standalone fantasy novel, Thomas the Rhymer, which won the World Fantasy Award and Mythopoeic Award.

== Children's books ==
Title	Series, where applicable	Format	Year of first publication	First edition publisher	Notes	ISBN	Ref.
Outlaws of Sherwood Forest	Choose Your Own Adventure (No. 47)	Gamebook	1985	Bantam Books	Illustrated by Judith Mitchell.	978-0-553-25069-5	
The Enchanted Kingdom	Choose Your Own Adventure (No. 56)	Gamebook	1986	Bantam Books	Illustrated by Judith Mitchell.	978-0-553-25861-5	
Statue of Liberty Adventure	Choose Your Own Adventure (No. 58)	Gamebook	1986	Bantam Books	Illustrated by Ted Enik.	978-0-553-25813-4	
Mystery of the Secret Room	Choose Your Own Adventure (No. 63)	Gamebook	1986	Bantam Books	Illustrated by Judith Mitchell.	978-0-553-26270-4	
Knights of the Round Table	Choose Your Own Adventure (No. 86)	Gamebook	1988	Bantam Books	Illustrated by Judith Mitchell.	978-0-553-27595-7	
St. Nicholas and the Valley Beyond		Picture book	1994	Viking Press	Illustrated by Richard W. Burhans.	978-0-670-84420-3	

== Novels ==
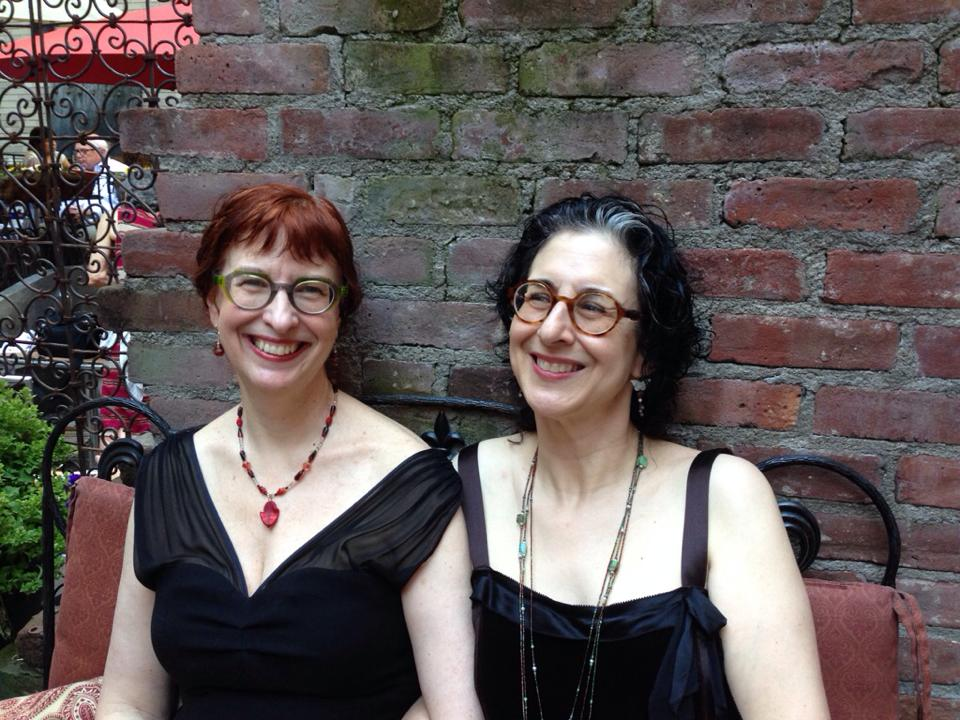
Kushner (right) with spouse and collaborator Delia Sheman in 2015

Title	Series, where applicable	Year of first publication	First edition publisher	Notes	ISBN	Ref.
Swordspoint	Riverside	1987	Unwin Hyman		978-0-04-823352-3	
Thomas the Rhymer		1990	William Morrow		978-1-55710-046-7	
The Fall of the Kings	Riverside	2002	Bantam Spectra	Written with Delia Sherman.	978-0-553-38184-9	
The Privilege of the Sword	Riverside	2006	Bantam Spectra		978-0-553-38268-6	

== Poetry ==
Title	Year of first publication	First edition publication	Ref.
"Gwydion's Loss of Llew"	1982	Elsewhere, Vol. II, edited by Mark Alan Arnold and Terri Windling, Ace Books	
"Sonata: For Two Friends in Different Times of the Same Trouble"	1990	Monochrome: The Readercon Anthology, edited by Bryan Cholfin, Broken Mirrors Press	

== Short fiction ==
Title	Series, where applicable	Format	Year of first publication	First edition publisher/publication	Notes	ISBN	Ref.
"The Unicorn Masque"		Short story	1981	Elsewhere, edited by Mark Alan Arnold and Terri Windling, Ace Books			
"Red-Cloak"	Riverside	Short story	1982	Whispers, vol. 5	Collected in Swordspoint (2003), Bantam Spectra.		
"Charis"	Chronicles of the Borderlands	Novelette	1986	Borderland, edited by Mark Alan Arnold and Terri Windling, Signet Books			
"Lazarus"		Short story	1986	Heroic Visions II, edited by Jessica Amanda Salmonson, Ace Books			
"Mockery"	Chronicles of the Borderlands	Novella	1986	Bordertown, edited by Mark Alan Arnold and Terri Windling, Signet Books	Written with Terri Windling (credited as Bellamy Bach).		
"Night Laughter"		Short story	1986	After Midnight, edited by Charles L. Grant, Tor Books			
"Lost in the Mail"		Linked short stories	1991	Life on the Border, edited by Terri Windling, Tor Books			
"The Swordsman Whose Name Was Not Death"	Riverside	Short story	1991	The Magazine of Fantasy & Science Fiction, vol. 81, no. 3	Collected in Swordspoint (2003), Bantam Spectra.		
"Playing with Fire"		Short story	1993	The Women's Press Book of New Myth and Magic, edited by Helen Windrath, The Women's Press			
"The Hunt of the Unicorn"		Short story	1995	Peter S. Beagle's Immortal Unicorn, edited by Peter S. Beagle, Janet Berliner, and Martin H. Greenberg, Harper Prism			
"Now I Lay Me Down to Sleep"		Short story	1995	The Armless Maiden and Other Tales for Childhood's Survivors, edited by Terri Windling, Tor Books			
"The Death of Raven"		Short story	1997	The Horns of Elfland, edited by Donald G. Keller, Ellen Kushner, and Delia Sherman, Roc Books			
"The Fall of the Kings"	Riverside	Novelette	1997	Bending the Landscape: Fantasy, edited by Nicola Griffith and Stephen Pagel, White Wolf Publishing	Written with Delia Sherman.		
"The Death of the Duke"	Riverside	Short story	1998	Starlight 2, edited by Patrick Nielsen Hayden, Tor Books	Collected in Swordspoint (2003), Bantam Spectra.		
"The House of Nine Doors"		Short story	1998	Sirens and Other Daemon Lovers, edited by Ellen Datlow and Terri Windling, Harper Prism			
"Hot Water: A Bordertown Romance"	Chronicles of the Borderlands	Short story	1998	The Essential Bordertown, edited by Terri Windling and Delia Sherman, Tor Books			
The Golden Dreydl		Chapbook	2007	Charlesbridge Publishing	Illustrated by Ilene Winn-Lederer.	978-1-58089-135-6	
"Honoured Guest"	Riverside	Short story	2007	The Coyote Road: Trickster Tales, edited by Ellen Datlow & Terri Windling, Viking Press	Illustrated by Charles Vess.		
"The Shoes That Were Danced to Pieces"		Short story	2009	Troll's Eye View: A Book of Villainous Tales, edited by Ellen Datlow and Terri Windling, Viking Press			
"A Wild and a Wicked Youth"	Riverside	Short story	2009	The Magazine of Fantasy & Science Fiction, vol. 116			
"Dulce Domum"		Short story	2009	Eclipse Three: New Science Fiction and Fantasy, edited by Jonathan Strahan, Night Shade Books			
"Last Drink Bird Head"		Short story	2009	Last Drink Bird Head: Flash Fiction for Charity, edited by Ann VanderMeer and Jeff VanderMeer, The Ministry of Whimsy Press			
"The Children of Cadmus"		Short story	2010	The Beastly Bride: Tales of the Animal People, edited by Ellen Datlow and Terri Windling, Viking Press			
The Man with the Knives	Riverside	Chapbook	2010	Temporary Culture	Illustrated by Thomas Canty.	978-0-9764660-6-2	
"The Duke of Riverside"	Riverside	Short story	2011	Naked City: Tales of Urban Fantasy, edited by Ellen Datlow, St. Martin's Griffin			
"History"		Short story	2011	Teeth: Vampire Tales, edited by Ellen Datlow and Terri Windling, Harper			
"Welcome to Bordertown"	Chronicles of the Borderlands	Novella	2011	Welcome to Bordertown, edited by Holly Black and Ellen Kushner, Random House Children’s Books	Written with Terri Windling.		
"The Threefold World"		Short story	2012	Under My Hat: Tales from the Cauldron, edited by Jonathan Strahan, Random House			
"One Last, Great Adventure"		Short story	2013	Fearsome Journeys, edited by Jonathan Strahan, Solaris Books	Written with Ysabeau S. Wilce.		
"The Vital Importance of the Superficial"		Short story	2013	Queen Victoria's Book of Spells: An Anthology of Gaslamp Fantasy, edited by Ellen Datlow and Terri Windling, Tor Books	Written with Caroline Stevermer.		
"Prise de Fer"		Short story	2014	Games Creatures Play, edited by Charlaine Harris and Toni L. P. Kelner, Ace Books			
"Arrivals"	Tremontaine	Short story	2015	Tremontaine, edited by Patty Bryant, Joel Derfner, Alaya Dawn Johnson, Ellen Kushner, Malinda Lo, Racheline Maltese, and Paul Witcover, Saga Press	Illustrated by Kathleen Jennings		
"When Two Swordsmen Meet"		Short story	2015	Stories for Chip: A Tribute to Samuel R. Delany, edited by Bill Campbell and Nisi Shawl, Rosarium Publishing			
"Beauty Sleeping"		Short story	2016	Angels of the Meanwhile, edited by Alexandra Erin			
"Convocation"	Tremontaine	Short story	2016				
"Departures"	Tremontaine	Short story	2016	Tremontaine, edited by Patty Bryant, Joel Derfner, Alaya Dawn Johnson, Ellen Kushner, Malinda Lo, Racheline Maltese, and Paul Witcover, Saga Press	Illustrated by Kathleen Jennings		
"Ambition"	Tremontaine	Short story	2017				
"Dissolution"	Tremontaine	Short story	2017				
"When I Was a Highwayman"	Riverside	Short story	2017	The Book of Swords, edited by Gardner Dozois, Bantam Books			
"Onward"	Tremontaine	Short story	2018		Written with Tessa Gratton, Karen Lord, and Racheline Maltese.		
"What the River Wants"	Tremontaine	Short story	2018				
"The Sweet Tooth of Angwar Bec"	Riverside	Short story	2020	Silk & Steel: A Queer Speculative Adventure Anthology, edited by Janine A. Southard, Cantina Publishing			
"Immortal Coil"		Short story	2021	Uncanny Magazine, issue 41			

== Non-fiction ==
Title	Year of first publication	First edition publication	Ref.
"Girls on Boys on Boys"	2015	Fantasy, issue 59	
"Ballad Land"	2019	Literary Cultures and Medieval and Early Modern Childhoods, edited by Naomi J. Miller and Diane Purkiss, Springer Publishing	

== Edited volumes ==
Title	Series, where applicable	Year of first publication	First edition publisher	Notes	ISBN	Ref.
Basilisk		1980	Ace Books	Illustrated by Terri Windling.	978-0-441-04820-5	
The Horns of Elfland		1997	Roc Books	Edited with Donald G. Keller and Delia Sherman.	978-0-451-45599-4	
Welcome to Bordertown	Chronicles of the Borderlands	2011	Random House Children’s Books	Edited with Holly Black.	978-0-375-89745-0	
Tremontaine	Tremontaine	2017	Saga Press	Originally presented serially in 2016 by Serial Box.	978-1-4814-8558-6	
