= Doris Egan =

American novelist

- Born: 1955 (age 70–71)
- Occupations: Writer, producer
- Writing career
- Pen name: Jane Emerson
- Website: www.dorisegan.com

Doris Egan (born 1955) is an American screenwriter, producer, and writer. She has worked on Smallville, Dark Angel, and House as well as many other television programs.

== Partial bibliography ==
=== Gate of Ivory trilogy ===
- The Gate of Ivory (February 1989, DAW Books, ISBN 978-0-88677-328-1)
- Two-Bit Heroes (January 1992, DAW Books, ISBN 978-0-88677-500-1)
- Guilt-Edged Ivory (September 1992, DAW Books, ISBN 978-0-88677-538-4)

=== Other books ===
- City of Diamond (as Jane Emerson) (March 1996, DAW Books, ISBN 978-0-88677-704-3)

=== Short stories ===
- "The New Tiresias" (1997, as Jane Emerson) in The Horns of Elfland (ed. Ellen Kushner, Delia Sherman, and Donald G. Keller)

== Partial filmography ==
=== Writer ===
- The Good Doctor (2019–21)
- Swamp Thing (2019)
- Krypton (2018)
- Mars Project (2016) (TV movie)
- Black Sails (2014)
- Reign (2013–15)
- Torchwood: Miracle Day (2011)
- House (2006–2010)
- Tru Calling (2004–2005)
- Numb3rs (2005)
- Skin (2003)
- The Agency (2003)
- Smallville (2002)
- Dark Angel (2001)
- Profiler (1998–1999)
- Profiler (1998)
- Early Edition (1996)

=== Producer ===
- Swamp Thing (2019)
- Krypton (2018)
- Mars Project (2016) (TV movie)
- Black Sails (2014)
- Reign (2013-2015)
- Torchwood: Miracle Day (2011)
- House (2005–2010)
- Numb3rs (2005)
- Tru Calling (2004-2005)
- Skin (2003-2004)
- NCIS (2003)
- Smallville (2001-2002)
- The Agency (2001)
- Dark Angel (2001)
