= Jack Womack =

American writer (born 1956)

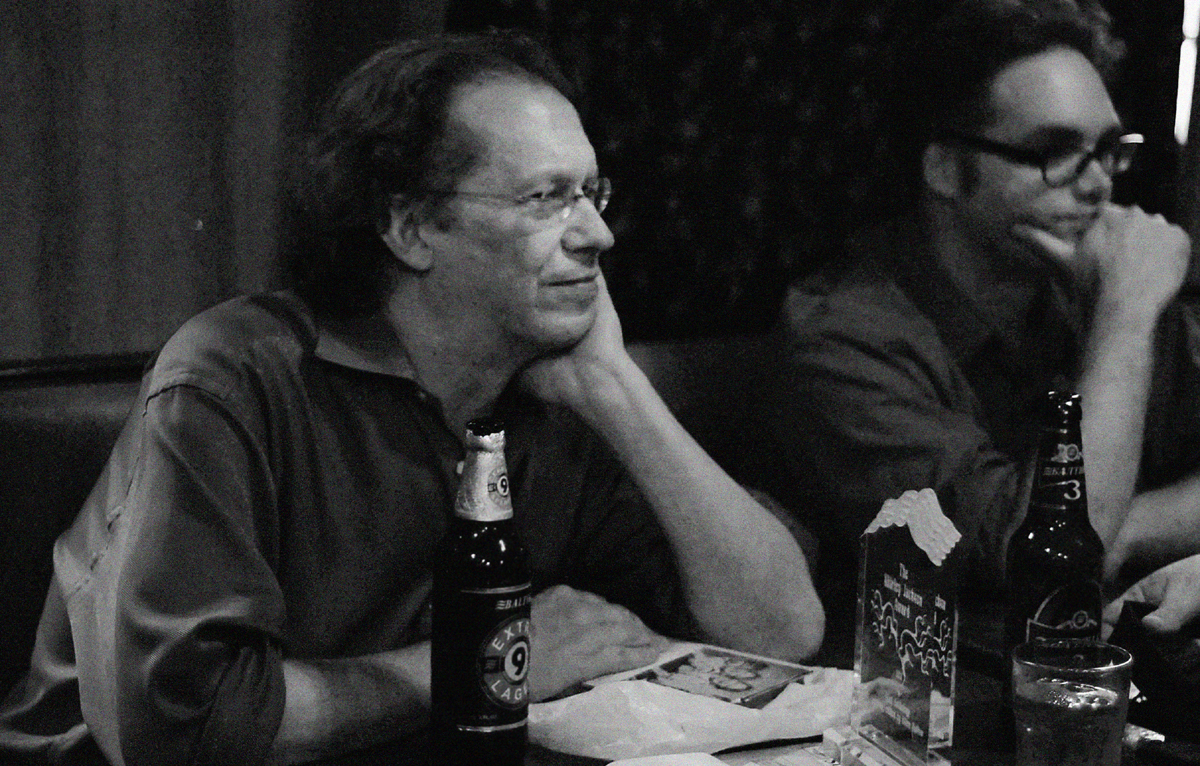
Jack Womack (2008)

Jack Womack (born January 8, 1956) is an American author of fiction and speculative fiction.

Womack was born in Lexington, Kentucky, and now lives in New York City with his wife and daughter. "Yeah, I was in Kentucky. Lived there till I was 21, moved up here, and I've lived in my present apartment for 32 years in April."

Womack's fiction may be determinedly non-cyber, but, with its commitment to using SF as a vehicle for social critique, it definitely has a punky edge. William Gibson once said that he thought he was more interested in basic economics and politics than the average blue sky SF writer. That counts double for Womack, whose fiction is packed with grimly amusing social satire and powerful little allegories exploring urban breakdown, class war and racial tensions.

— Jim McClellan (from an interview with Jack Womack, 1995)

== Bibliography ==
=== "Dryco" series ===
Ordered by internal chronology:

- Random Acts of Senseless Violence (October 1993) ISBN 0-246-13850-5
- Heathern (1990) ISBN 0-8021-3563-3
- Ambient (1987) ISBN 0-8021-3494-7
- Terraplane (1988) ISBN 0-8021-3562-5
- Elvissey (January 1993) ISBN 0-8021-3495-5 (Philip K. Dick Award, 1994)
- Going, Going, Gone (2000) ISBN 0-8021-3866-7

=== Other novels ===
- Let's Put the Future Behind Us (1996) ISBN 0-87113-627-9

=== Short stories ===
- "Out of Sight, Out of Mind" (1990) in Walls of Fear (ed. Kathryn Cramer)
- "A Kiss, a Wink, a Grassy Knoll" (1991) in OMNI (ed. Ellen Datlow)
- "Lifeblood" (1991) in Whisper of Blood (ed. Ellen Datlow)
- "That Old School Tie" (1994) in Little Deaths (ed. Ellen Datlow)
- "Audience" (1997) in The Horns of Elfland (ed. Ellen Kushner, Delia Sherman, and Donald G. Keller)

=== Nonfiction ===
- Flying Saucers Are Real! (2016) ISBN 978-1-944860-00-4
