= Lucy Sussex =

New Zealand writer (born 1957)

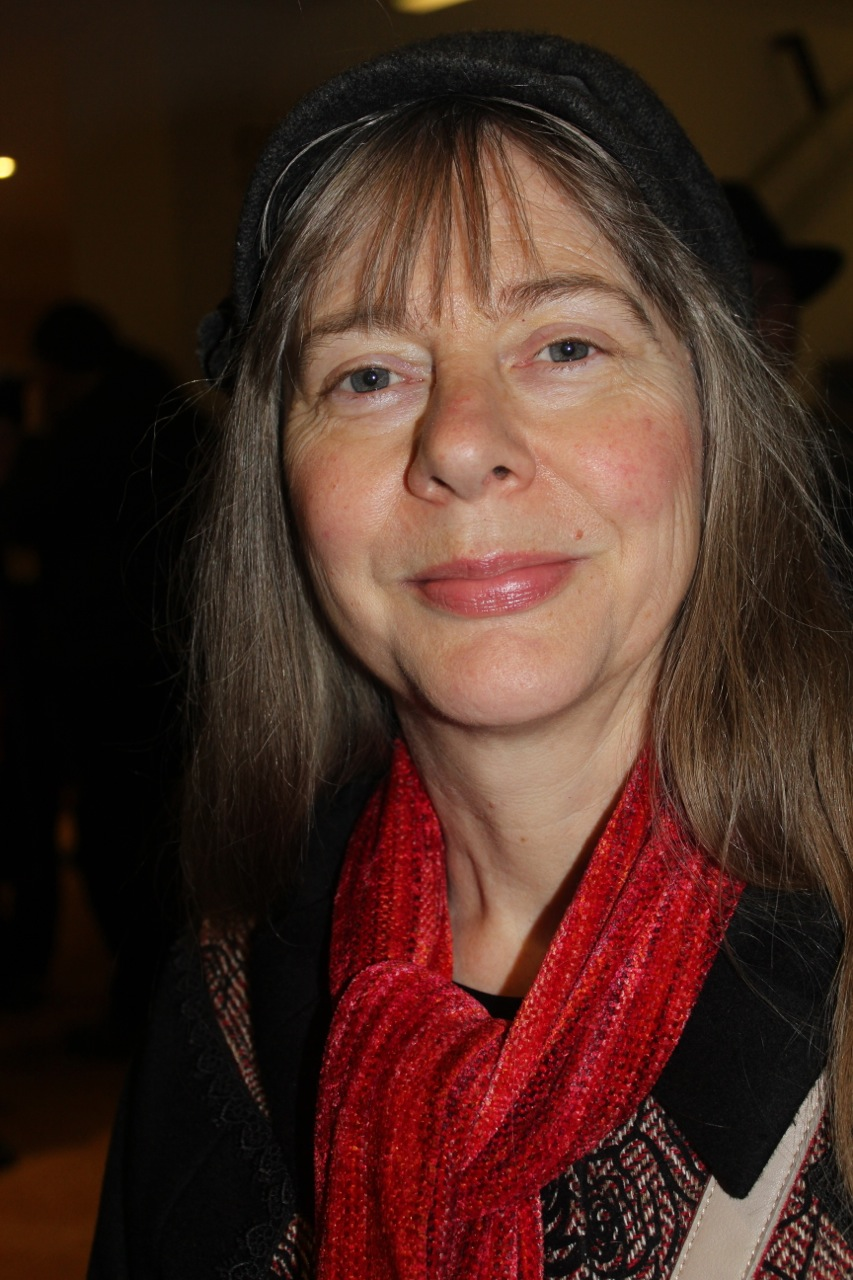
- Sussex in 2013
- Born: 1957 (age 68–69); Christchurch, New Zealand
- Education: MA in Librarianship, and PhD in English Literature
- Alma mater: Monash University, University of Wales
- Writing career
- Language: English
- Years active: 1983-

Lucy Sussex (born 1957 in New Zealand) is an author working in fantasy and science fiction, children's and teenage writing, non-fiction and true crime. She is also an editor, reviewer, academic and teacher, and currently resides in Melbourne, Australia.

She is often associated with feminist science fiction, Australiana, the history of women's writing, and detective fiction.

== Personal life ==
Lucy Sussex was born in 1957 in Christchurch, New Zealand. She has lived in New Zealand, France, the United Kingdom and Australia, where she settled in 1971, and has spent the majority of her time since. She has a degree in English and an MA in Librarianship from Monash University, and also a Ph.D. from the University of Wales.

She has been writing since the age of eleven. In 1979 she attended a Sydney-based Science Fiction Writers' Workshop, conducted by Terry Carr and George Turner and soon after published her first short stories locally and overseas.

== Fiction ==
Lucy Sussex's fiction has spanned a range of genres, including Science Fiction, Fantasy, Horror and Crime and Detective fiction and been aimed at the children's, young adult and adult fiction markets. She has published six novels - the first appearing in 1995 - and over 30 short stories, which have been collected across three anthologies. Her first story to gain notice might be 1985's The Lipton Village Society, which involved the creation of an alternate world.

== Style and themes ==
Sussex is strongly feminist. Victoriana styles and motifs recur in her work, as do dolls. The Scarlet Rider is a fictionalization of her search for Mary Fortune.

== Non fiction, academic and editorial work ==
Sussex works as a freelance editor and researcher and has published literary criticism and journalism. She is a Fellow at the Federation University Ballarat, and La Trobe University.

She writes reviews - until 2013 for The Age newspaper on a weekly basis, which involved reading 5-6 books per week.

She has edited several anthologies, including She's Fantastical, the first collection of Australian women's speculative fiction, magical realism and fantasy to be published in that country. The volume was short listed for the prestigious World Fantasy Award in 1996.

She has also described herself as a 'literary archaeologist' having rediscovered and republished the work of nineteenth-century Australian crime writers Mary Fortune and Ellen Davitt. Fortune's full identity was uncovered through Sussex's scholarship, having been previously only known by pseudonyms for many decades. Her Ph.D. thesis also focused on early women crime writers, the mothers of the genre.

== Contribution to science fiction and fantasy culture ==
Sussex has participated in numerous conventions and conferences, either as guest or panelist.

She has for many years maintained an active interest in encouraging emerging writers in the speculative fiction field, conducting a number of workshops, including at Aussiecon III, the 1999 World SF Convention in Melbourne. She was a teacher at Clarion West, in Seattle in 2001 and at Clarion South in 2004. She has regularly conducted workshops in her home city of Melbourne, of varying lengths and themes, most recently facilitating a Science Fiction Novel writing challenge in 2008–09.

In 2003 Sussex was awarded the Chandler Award for "Outstanding Achievement in Australian Science Fiction", which recognised the scope of her achievements in the Australian Science Fiction and Fantasy fields as practitioner, academic and teacher. She was awarded the Peter McNamara award in 2010.

== Awards ==
In 1989, she won her first Ditmar Award for short story "My Lady Tongue" about a lesbian feminist community. She won three further Ditmars, for her novel The Scarlet Rider (1997), novella "La Sentinelle" (2004), and short story "Absolute Uncertainty". "Merlusine" won the Aurealis Award for Best Fantasy Short Story in 1998, and "La Sentinelle" won an Aurealis Award in 2003. In 2008 her short story "Mist and Murder" won a Sir Julius Vogel Award.

Blockbuster! Fergus Hume and the Mystery of a Hansom Cab won the History Publication Award in the Victorian Community History Awards in 2015. It was shortlisted for the 2017 Best Non Fiction prize in the Ngaio Marsh Awards.

She was a judge for the international James Tiptree, Jr. Award in 1995, and has subsequently judged the Age, Victorian Premier's and ASAL gold medal awards.

== Bibliography ==
=== Novels ===
- The Peace Garden. OUP. 1989.
- Deersnake (Hodder and Stoughton, 1994)
- The Scarlet Rider (Forge, 1996)
- The Penguin Friend (Omnibus Books, 1997)
- Black Ice, (Hodder Headline Australia, 1997)
- The Revognase (Lothian, 2003)

=== Short fiction ===
Collections

- My Lady Tongue and Other Tales, (Heinemann, 1990)
- A Tour Guide in Utopia, (MirrorDanse, 2005)
- Absolute Uncertainty, (Aqueduct Press, 2006)
- Matilda Told Such Dreadful Lies: The Essential Lucy Sussex, (Ticonderoga Publications, 2011)
- Thief of Lives (Twelfth Planet, 2011)

Selected stories

Title	Year	First published	Reprinted/collected	Notes
The Parish and Mrs Brown	1983	DreamWorks: Strange New Stories ed. David King		
The Lipton Village Society	1985	Strange Attractors ed. Damien Broderick		
Montage	1985	Urban Fantasies ed. David King and Russell Blackford		
My Lady Tongue	1988	Matilda at the Speed of Light ed. Damien Broderick	My Lady Tongue & Other Tales	
Merlusine	1997	The Horns of Elfland ed. Ellen Kushner, Delia Sherman and Donald G. Keller		
Absolute Uncertainty	2001	"Absolute Uncertainty". F&SF. 100 (4): 136–160. April 2001.		

- "Quartet in D Minor" (1988, also known as "Quartet in Death Minor") in My Lady Tongue & Other Tales
- "God and Her Black Sense of Humour" (1990) in My Lady Tongue & Other Tales
- "Red Ochre" (1990) in My Lady Tongue & Other Tales
- "The Man Hanged Upside Down" (1990) in My Lady Tongue & Other Tales
- "Go-To" (1990) in My Lady Tongue & Other Tales
- "The Bogeyman" (1992) in Spine Chilling: Ten Horror Stories (ed. Penny Matthews)
- "The Lottery" (1994) in The Lottery: Nine Science Fiction Stories
- "Kay & Phil" (1994) in Alien Shores (ed. Peter McNamara, Margaret Winch)
- "The Lady with the Ermine" (1995) in Strange Fruit: Tales of the Unexpected (ed. Paul Collins)
- "A Tour Guide in Utopia" (1995) in A Tour Guide in Utopia
- "The Ghost of Mrs Rochester" (1996) in Eidolon (Australian magazine) #21, Autumn 1996 (ed. Jonathan Strahan, Jeremy G. Byrne, Richard Scriven)
- "Adeline" (1996) in Aurealis #18 (ed. Stephen Higgins, Dirk Strasser)
- "Matilda Told Such Dreadful Lies" (1998) in Dreaming Down-Under (ed. Jack Dann, Janeen Webb)
- "The Queen of Erewhon" (1999) in The Magazine of Fantasy & Science Fiction September 1999 (ed. Gordon Van Gelder)
- "The Morgue" (2000) in Tales from the Wasteland: Stories from the 13th Floor (ed. Paul Collins)
- "The Gloaming" (2000) in Eidolon No.29/30, Autumn 2000 (ed. Jeremy G. Byrne)
- "The Work of Giants — Minimus' story" (2002) in The Road to Camelot (ed. Sophie Masson)
- "Frozen Charlottes" (2003) in Forever Shores (ed. Margaret Winch, Peter McNamara)
- "Runaway" (2003, also known as "Runaways") in Agog! Terrific Tales (ed. Cat Sparks)
- "La Sentinelle" (2003) in Southern Blood: New Australian Tales of the Supernatural (ed. Bill Congreve)
- "Matricide" (2005) in The Year's Best Australian Science Fiction & Fantasy: Volume Two (ed. Bill Congreve, Michelle Marquardt)
- "Duchess" (2006) in Absolute Uncertainty
- "A Small Star of Cold" (2006) in Absolute Uncertainty
- "A Sentimental, Sordid Education" (2006) in Absolute Uncertainty
- "The Revenant" (2006) in Eidolon I (ed. Jeremy G. Byrne, Jonathan Strahan)
- "Mist and Murder" (2007) in New Ceres Issue 2
- "Ardent Clouds" (2008) in The Del Rey Book of Science Fiction and Fantasy (ed. Ellen Datlow)
- "Robots & Zombies, Inc." (2008) in Dreaming Again (ed. Jack Dann)
- "Something Better Than Death" (2009) in Aurealis #42 (ed. Stuart Mayne)
- "Albert and Victoria/Slow Dreams" (2010) in Baggage (ed Gillian Polack)

=== Edited ===
- The Fortunes of Mary Fortune (Penguin, 1989)
- The Lottery: Nine Science Fiction Stories (Omnibus Books, 1994)
- The Patternmaker: Nine Science Fiction Stories (Omnibus Books, 1994)
- Shadow Alley: Nine Crime Stories (Omnibus Books, 1995)
- She's Fantastical (Sybylla Press, 1995)
- Saltwater in the Ink: Voices from the Australian Seas (Australian Scholarly Press, 2010)
- The Detectives' Album by Mary Fortune (Broken Silicon Press, USA and Canada, 2003)
- Three Detective Stories by Mary Fortune (Mulini, 2009)
- Nothing but Murder and Bloodshed and Hanging (Verse Chorus Press, 2025)

=== Non-fiction ===
- Contrary Modes (1985) with Jenny Blackford, Russell Blackford and Norman Talbot
- Woman Writers and Detectives in Nineteenth-Century Crime Fiction: the Mothers of the Mystery Genre (Palgrave-Macmillan, 2010)
- Blockbuster! Fergus Hume and The Mystery of a Hansom Cab (Text Publishing, 2015)
- Outrageous Fortunes: The Adventures of Mary Fortune, Crime Writer, and Her Criminal Son (La Trobe University Press, 2025) with Megan Brown

Bibliographies

- Canadian Women's History Bibliography with Klay Dyer and Sue Martin, (Canadian Institute for Historical Microreproductions, 1997)
- Mary Fortune with Elizabeth Gibson, (Victorian Fiction Research Guide 27), Victorian Fiction Research Unit, Department of English, University of Queensland, 1998.

== Other sources ==
- The Encyclopedia of Science Fiction, page 1189
