= Ambient =

Ambient or ambiance or ambience may refer to:

== Arts and entertainment ==
- Ambiancé, an unreleased experimental film
- Ambient (novel), a novel by Jack Womack

=== Music and sound ===
- Ambience (sound recording), also known as atmospheres or backgrounds
- Ambient music, a genre of music that puts an emphasis on tone and atmosphere
- Ambient (album), by Moby
- Ambience (album), by the Lambrettas
- Virgin Ambient series, a series of 24 albums released on the UK Virgin Records label between 1993 and 1997
- Ambient 1–4, a set of four albums by Brian Eno, released by Obscure Records between 1978 and 1982
- Stingray Ambiance, the channel "Ambiance" on the Singray music service
- Ambience, an alternative name for the Malian EDM genre Balani show

== Other ==
- Ambient (computation), a process calculus
- Ambient (desktop environment), a MUI-based desktop environment for MorphOS
- Mark Ambient (1860–1937), pen name of Harold Harley, English dramatist
- MS Ambience, a cruise ship
- Ambient Technologies, semiconductor company specialising in modem ICs, spun off from Cirrus Logic in 1999 and purchased by Intel in 2000

== See also ==
- Ambient lighting (disambiguation)
