= Ambiente =

Ambiente may refer to:

== Music ==
- Zoell Farrujia, band member of Panoptica
- Ambiente, album by Laserdance 1991
- "Ambiente", song by J Balvin from Vibras 2018

== See also ==
- Ambient (disambiguation)
