= Outrageous Fortune =

"Outrageous Fortune" is a phrase from the "To be, or not to be" soliloquy spoken by Shakespeare's Hamlet.

Outrageous Fortune may also refer to:

- Outrageous Fortune (play), a 1947 farce by Ben Travers
- Outrageous Fortune (film), a 1987 Hollywood film
- Outrageous Fortune (TV series), a New Zealand drama series, produced from 2005 to 2010
- Outrageous Fortune, American title of a 2006 book
- Outrageous Fortunes, a 2025 book
