= Laser dance =

Laser dance may refer to:

- Laserdance, a synthdance studio project
- Laser-dance, a music featured in the film Ocean's Twelve
