= Random Acts of Senseless Violence =

1993 novel by Jack Womack

- First edition (UK)
- Author: Jack Womack
- Language: English
- Series: "Dryco" series
- Genre: Speculative fiction, dystopian novel
- Publisher: HarperCollins (UK); Atlantic Monthly Press (US)
- Publication date: October 1993 (UK); September 1994 (US)
- Publication place: United States
- Media type: Print (hardcover)
- Pages: 256
- ISBN: 0-246-13850-5
- Preceded by: Elvissey
- Followed by: Going, Going, Gone

Random Acts of Senseless Violence is a dystopian and speculative fiction novel by Jack Womack.

== Plot introduction ==
The novel is told in the form of a fictional diary by the 12-year-old protagonist Lola Hart, and details Lola and her family's experiences in a near future Manhattan, in which violence, rising unemployment, and riots are commonplace in the city, as well as the rest of the United States. As the novel progresses, Lola transforms from a student at one of Manhattan's most privileged private schools to a street-wise gangster as she and her family struggle to survive the despair of a crumbling government and economy.

== Critical reception ==
The book did not attract significant attention on release; though there were a few reviews, it was not nominated for any awards even though Womack's previous work, Elvissey, won the prestigious Philip K. Dick Award and was shortlisted for the Locus Award. In a July 2008 article for Tor.com, Jo Walton decried the critical neglect of the work. Walton speculated that its lack of prominence was due to its initial low-key reception, the "singularly appalling" cover art of the early editions, a title that was "off-putting" and misleading, and its disconnect from the zeitgeist of the time, which was focused on cyberpunk and space opera. She was echoed by fellow science fiction author Cory Doctorow, who described the work as "an unflinching, engrossing, difficult coming-of-age story" and referred to it as "Womack's underappreciated masterpiece". William Gibson described it as the book he thinks is most underrated.

== Publication history ==
- 1993, UK, HarperCollins, ISBN 0-246-13850-5, Pub date October 1993, Hardback
- 1994, US, Atlantic Monthly Press, ISBN 0-87113-577-9, Pub date September 1994, Hardback
- 1994, UK, HarperCollins, ISBN 0-586-21320-1, Pub date October 1994, Paperback
- 1995, US, Grove Press, ISBN 0-8021-3424-6, Pub date October 1995, Paperback
- 2013, UK, Gollancz, ISBN 978-0-575-13230-6, Pub date October 2013, Paperback
