= Mary Fortune =

Australian detective writer (1832–1911)

- Born: Mary Wilson; 29 July 1832; Carrickfergus, Ireland
- Died: 9 November 1911 (aged 79); Windsor, Victoria, Australia
- Spouses: Joseph Fortune (m. 1851; died 1861) Percy Rollo Brett (m. 1858)
- Children: 2
- Writing career
- Pen name: Waif Wander; W. W.; M. H. F.; Sylphid; Nemia
- Genre: Crime fiction

Mary Helena Fortune (née Wilson; 29 July 1832 – 9 November 1911) was an Australian author and journalist who was one of the earliest female writers of detective fiction. A prolific pseudonymous writer of fiction, poetry, and journalism, she contributed chiefly to The Australian Journal. Her best-known work, The Detective's Album, comprised more than 500 short stories published in the journal between 1868 and 1908. Fortune's writing was characterised by an unsparing portrayal of colonial society and urban Melbourne, incorporating the prevalence of violence and the mistreatment of women.

Born in Ireland, Fortune moved to Canada as a child and travelled to Australia with her son in 1855, possibly to escape her marriage. She lived in the goldfields settlements that emerged during the Australian gold rushes, where she had another child, entered a short-lived bigamous marriage with a policeman, and may have traded in illegal alcohol. Her early writings, including radical poetry, appeared in local goldfields newspapers. Following the establishment of The Australian Journal in 1865, she became a frequent and longstanding contributor.

Although best known for her short crime fiction, Fortune also wrote serial novels, poetry, journalism, a memoir, and at least one play. Her work extended beyond crime fiction and included romance, Gothic fiction, and ghost stories. Drawing on her experiences in the goldfields and in Melbourne's rapidly urbanising environment, her writing often criticised colonial society—particularly the treatment of women—and examined the failure of police to address sexual violence and other crimes against women.

Despite enjoying popularity as a writer, Fortune experienced poverty and periods of homelessness during later life. She sufferred alcoholism and her surviving son, George Fortune, spent more than 20 years in prison. Fortune died in 1911 shortly after leaving an asylum for the destitute. Knowledge of the connection between her identity and the pseudonyms she wrote under was nearly lost after her death, but was reestablished in the 1950s by bookcollector John Kinmont Moir. Since the 1980s, through the work of historian Lucy Sussex and others, the significance of Fortune's contributions have become more widely recognised.

== Biography ==
=== Early life ===
Mary Helena Fortune was born Mary Wilson on 29 July 1832 in Carrickfergus near Belfast, Ireland, into a family of Scottish origin. Her mother Eleanor (née Atkinson) died less than six months after her birth. She moved to Montreal, Canada, as a child with her father, a civil engineer named George Wilson. Based on her later writings, Mary and her father may have left Ireland around 1846 during the early years of the Great Famine of Ireland. While nothing is known about Mary's education, historians believe that her writing indicates she was well-educated.

Mary married a surveyor named Joseph Fortune on 25 March 1851 and had one son, Joseph George, in Canada. In 1855 she moved with her son to Australia to join her father, who had moved to the goldfields settlements that had emerged amid the Australian gold rushes. The historian Lucy Sussex speculates that Fortune likely fled Canada with her son to escape her marriage, knowing that Quebec's (Note: Then called Lower Canada.) legal code at the time would have almost certainly granted custody of her child to his father in the case of a separation or divorce.

=== Life in the goldfields ===
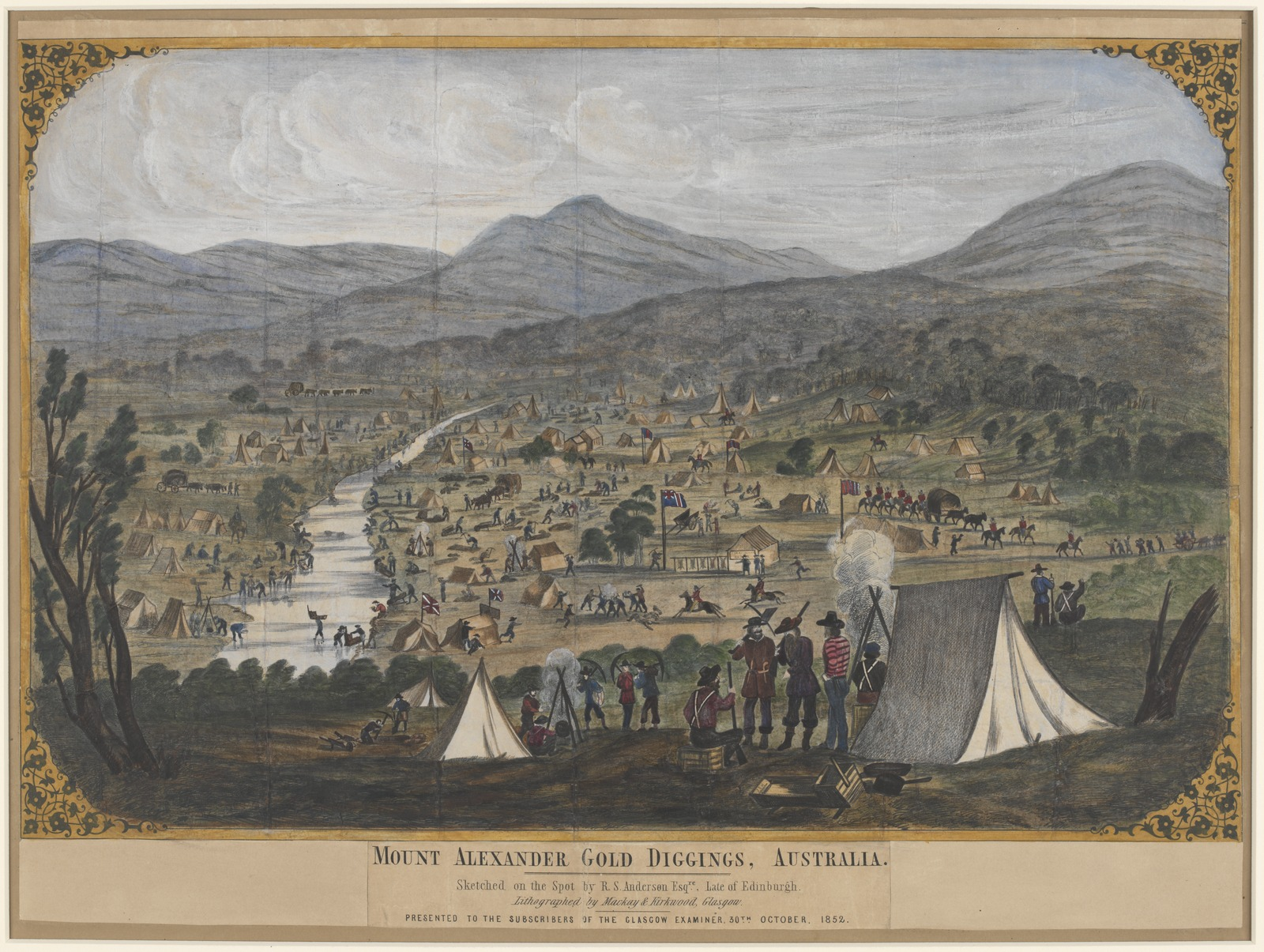
1852 sketch of the Mount Alexander goldfields, where Fortune lived upon her move to Australia

Fortune arrived in Australia with her son on 4 October 1855. The day after her arrival, Fortune placed an advertisement in a local newspaper to inform her father of her arrival. According to one of her later pieces of autobiographical writing, Fortune eventually managed to make contact with her father and learned that he had opened a store at Kangaroo Flat near Castlemaine. She travelled to meet him on a Cobb & Co coach. Kangaroo Flat, located near Mount Alexander, was a bustling goldfields settlement where Fortune's tent also served as the town's general store. The goldfields were rife with crime, substance abuse, and sexual violence—themes that would later feature prominently in much of Fortune's writing.

In 1856 Fortune and her father moved their store to the town of Buninyong near Ballarat. In November that year, Fortune had another son, Eastbourne Vaudrey (known as George). She claimed on the birth certificate that her husband Joseph Fortune was the father; historians believe that this is unlikely, as there is no record of Joseph Fortune ever being present in Australia prior to his death in Canada in 1861. According to her memoir, soon after the birth Fortune moved north to Chinaman's Flat near Maryborough. Sometime before the middle of 1857 she moved to her final goldfields residence in the nearby town of Kingower. Sussex believes that Fortune may have begun to sell illegal alcohol on the goldfields during this period. In January 1858 Mary's elder son died of "convulsions" (likely meningitis). She married an Irish-born mounted constable named Percy Rollo Brett in October of that year in Dunolly, claiming on the marriage certificate that she was a widow. Her marriage to Brett was not a success, and he soon moved to New South Wales where he later married another woman.

=== Early writing ===
The Song of the Gold Diggers

Hurrah for the free new land!
And hurrah for the diggers bold!
And hurrah for the strong unfettered right
To search in the hills for gold!
Turn up the sods my strong free mates,
And dig with a fearless hand:
For there's not a castled lordling here,
In all this glorious land!

— Mary Fortune, Mount Alexander Mail, December 1855

Fortune published her first pieces of writing under the initials "M. H. F." in local newspapers in 1855. In December 1855 she wrote a poem, "Song of the Gold Diggers", which was first published in the Mount Alexander Mail and then reprinted in other newspapers. The poem expressed Fortune's radical political sentiments and her sympathies for the cause of the Eureka Stockade rebels. She was offered a job at the Mount Alexander Mail in 1855, but the offer was withdrawn when it was discovered that "M. H. F." was in fact a woman with a young child.

Fortune began writing for the newly founded Australian Journal in 1865 and soon adopted the pen name "Waif Wander". The Australian Journal was a weekly magazine that borrowed from the design and business model of the successful London Journal. It attempted to attract readers by featuring locally written fiction. Fortune's first contribution to the journal, a poem addressed to her son, appeared in its second issue. In subsequent issues Fortune would contribute additional poems, a fictional memoir of her life in the goldfields, and her first work of detective fiction—a short story titled "The Stolen Specimens". Sussex believes that this was likely the world's first work of fiction written by a woman from the perspective of a detective. In November 1865 The Australian Journal announced that it would be publishing a series of crime stories by Fortune and the writer James Skipp Borlase. Fortune wrote a number of short crime stories for the journal as part of the series, including one of her best-known stories, "The Dead Witness". Borlase, a serial plagiarist, was credited as the author of several pieces in the series that are now believed to have been written partially or wholly by Fortune.

In 1866 and the early months of 1867, Fortune published four serial novels in The Australian Journal under her pen name "Waif Wander". By the following year Fortune is known to have been living on a farm in Oxley, and began to write short crime stories under the initials "W. W.". Most of Fortune's detective writing would continue to be published under these initials; Fortune's biographers Lucy Sussex and Megan Brown have suggested that this may have been to create a separation between the feminised novels of "Waif Wander" and the more masculine crime writing of "W. W.". One of these early short stories, "The White Maniac: A Doctor's Story", would become Fortune's most reprinted work. The story is a work of Gothic horror that recounts the story of a woman whose family confines her in an environment devoid of any colour when it is discovered that seeing anything but white causes her to become violent and homicidal.

=== Life in Melbourne ===
In 1868 Fortune moved to Melbourne. She wrote an account of her journey titled "Fourteen Days on the Roads" for The Australian Journal describing her observations of colonial society during the journey. That year she also began writing her longest-running and best-known work, The Detective's Album, a series of crime stories published in The Australian Journal over the course of the next forty years. In Melbourne, Fortune also began to write "panoramic" journalism about her observations of the urban environment.

In 1869 The Australian Journal switched from a weekly to a monthly publication frequency. Fortune's contributions to the journal were so significant that her writing would often be attributed variously to "M. H. F.", "Waif Wander", or "W. W." to disguise the fact that so much of the writing in each issue shared the same author. Between 1869 and 1870, Fortune also contributed nine stories to the journal's "Ladies' Page" under the pen name "Sylphid".

To supplement her income, Fortune began to work as a governess or housekeeper after her arrival in Melbourne, where she lived in the working-class suburbs of Fitzroy and Collingwood. Beginning in the 1870s, Fortune was arrested on multiple occasions for drunkenness and vagrancy. She was an alcoholic and barely earned enough from her writing to support herself. Fortune's contributions to The Australian Journal began to decrease in 1870, likely due to the appointment of her rival Marcus Clarke—with whom she had a strained relationship—as the journal's "conductor".

Information is required by the Russell-street police respecting Mary Fortune, who is a reluctant witness in a case of rape. Description: – 40 years of age, tall, pale complexion, thin build; wore dark jacket and skirt, black hat, and old elastic-side boots. Is much given to drink and has been locked up several times for drunkenness. Is a literary subscriber to several of the Melbourne newspapers. Stated she resided with a man named Rutherford, in Easy [Easey] Street, Collingwood.

— The only known description of Mary Fortune, published 10 February 1874 in the Police Gazette

In July 1871 Fortune's 14-year-old son George was arrested for stealing a hat and was labelled a "neglected child". Fortune was living in an institution for unemployed governesses without the means to pay for housing. George was sentenced to spend the next two years in a reform school in Sunbury. At the time, persuading the authorities to release a child from care depended largely on the respectability of the child's parents. While the exact reasons are unknown, Fortune was unsuccessful in her attempts to have George released.

In 1871 Fortune published her only book, a short story collection featuring stories reprinted from her series The Detective's Album. Sussex and Brown believe Fortune may have hoped that publishing a book would provide her with the respectability and cultural capital required to have her son released to her care. How Fortune financed the publication of the book is unknown. Later that year, she began writing her next serial novel for The Australian Journal, titled The Bushranger's Autobiography, featuring a protagonist based on her second husband Percy Rollo Brett.

Fortune's son George began running away from the reform school and committing petty crimes. In 1872 he was sentenced under a false name to a year in a reformatory located aboard a hulk named the Sir Harry Smith for stealing tobacco. With George increasingly coming into conflict with the law, Fortune seemingly lost interest in writing from the perspective of the police. She instead began a new series in late 1872 titled Navvies' Tales: Retold by the Boss; she would not write another story in The Detective's Album series for several years. By 1873, an entry for Fortune's son in the Children's Register indicated that his mother may have been living in a de facto relationship with a man named James Davidson. That year, George Fortune was moved to a new reformatory inside Pentridge Prison along with the other boys aboard the Sir Harry Smith. Fortune began publishing additional pieces in a new Catholic weekly publication called The Advocate, with several of her pieces written during this period featuring relationships between mothers and their sons. George Fortune was released in March 1873 and paroled to an employer, but quickly ran away and was arrested for burglary six months later. He was sentenced to two more years in the reformatory as a result. Upon his arrest, the police reported that his mother was "a drunk" living "in poor circumstances". By February 1874 she may have been living in another de facto relationship with a man named Rutherford. George was released in March 1875 and was sent to work on a farm near Kilmore owned by a former police officer, where he would remain out of trouble with the law for the next four years.

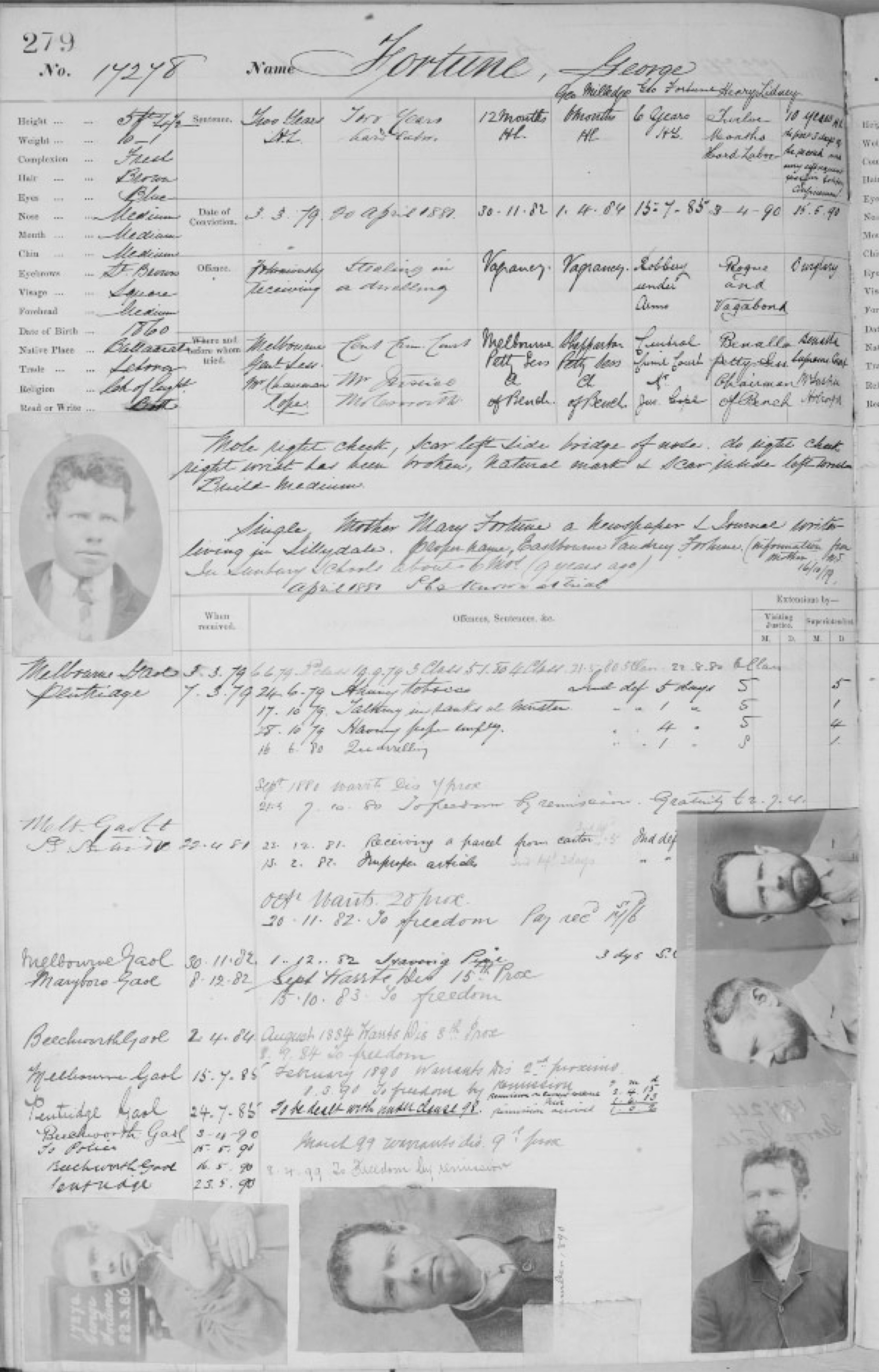
Police records of Mary Fortune's son George

With The Australian Journal beginning to experience financial difficulties, Fortune began to write additional short stories for The Herald in a series titled "Police Stories". She also made some extra income through the syndication of her stories to various local newspapers as part of a literary supplement. She lived for a time in Lilydale, but after George was sentenced to another term of imprisonment, she returned to Melbourne in 1879 to be nearer to him at Pentridge Prison. He had received his first adult jail sentence for "felonious receiving" after the theft of £100 from a neighbouring farmer. In August of that year she began editing a "Social Sketches" column for The Herald under the name "Nemia". One piece recounted her visit to Pentridge Prison to visit her son; she was likely sacked at the end of 1879 as a result of the damage it caused to her reputation.

In September 1881 Mary Fortune began publishing her ultimately unfinished memoir, Twenty-Six Years Ago, in serial form in The Australian Journal. George spent most of the period between 1881 and 1899 imprisoned for various crimes, including sentences for armed bank robbery and burglary. During this period Mary Fortune began to write a number of stories centred on rehabilitation and the ways in which men were led to commit crime. In 1899 George was released and left for Tasmania under a new identity. He continued to re-offend and was sentenced to three more terms of imprisonment, before finally receiving another 10-year sentence in 1904 for burglary. In May 1907 he died of Bright's disease at Hobart Gaol, likely exacerbated by the poor conditions inside the prison and the time he had spent in irons and solitary confinement as punishment for an attempted escape. Brown and Sussex have noted that while George Fortune was a repeat offender, he was not a violent man and was instead "damned by dodgy friends" and frequently set up by police and informants. Sussex has also observed the gap between the life of George Fortune and the fiction of his mother, writing that Mary Fortune's writing showcased the "big melodramas of murder and bushranging" rather than the petty crimes of criminals like her son.

=== Later life and death ===
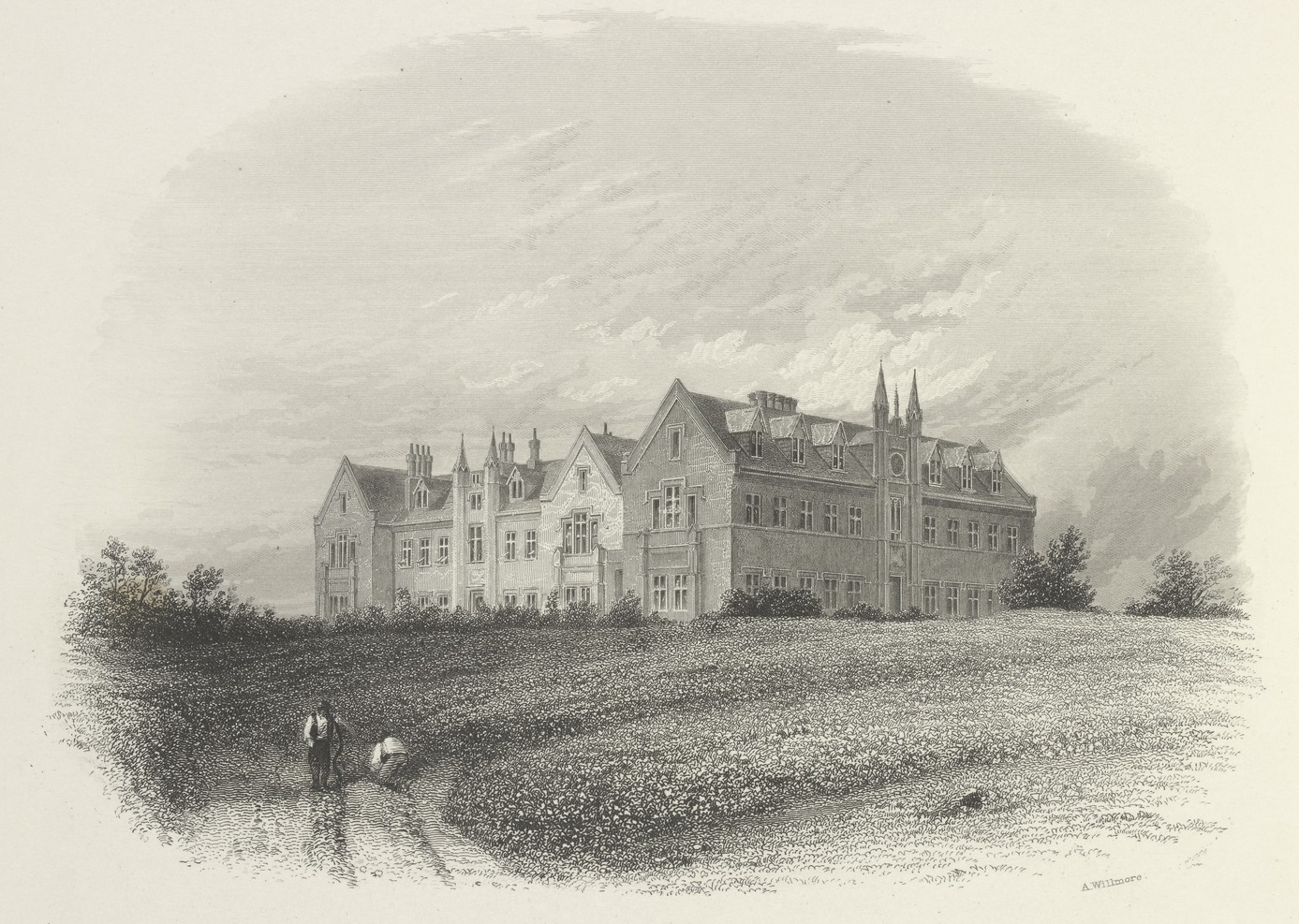
The North Melbourne benevolent asylum, where Fortune was admitted in 1910

Fortune continued to experience poverty and unstable housing in her later years, and likely began to suffer from dementia. She was ineligible for a state pension as she did not meet the requirement of having lived a "sober and reputable life" for at least five years. By 1907, Fortune had lost most of her eyesight and could no longer write. The Detective's Album finally ceased publication after 40 years in 1908. With her financial situation increasingly dire, The Australian Journal gave her a small pension to support her in her final years. In 1910, she was admitted to the North Melbourne benevolent asylum. On 9 November 1911, after her release from the asylum, she died at the age of 79 of a cerebral haemorrhage in Windsor. She was buried in an unmarked grave at the Springvale Botanical Cemetery in a plot belonging to the family of one of the publishers of The Australian Journal, which had paid for her burial.

== Writing ==
=== Short stories and The Detective's Album ===
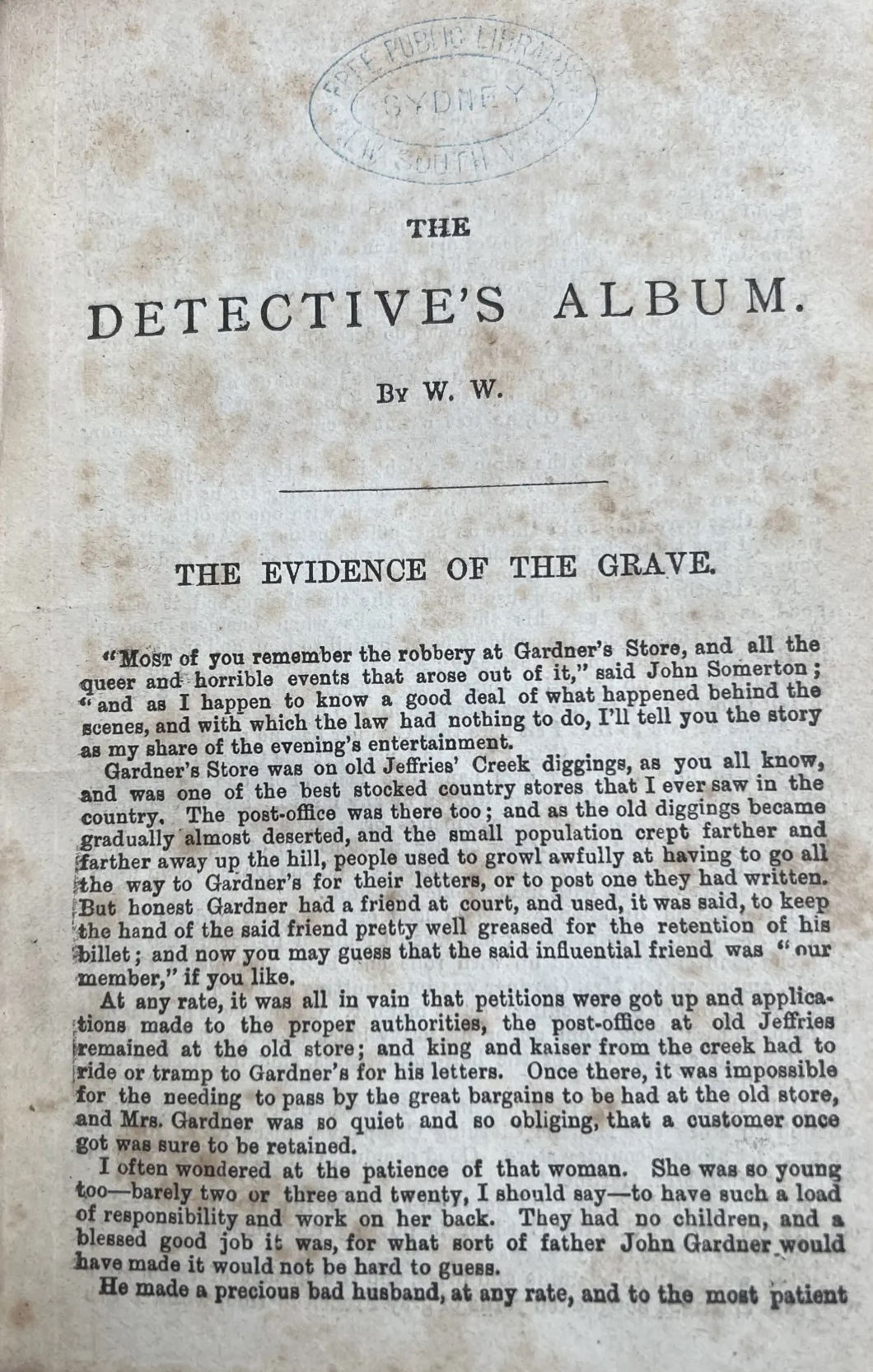
Title page of Mary Fortune's 1871 book The Detective's Album

Fortune's best-known piece of work was The Detective's Album, a series of short stories styled on a detective's casebook narrated by a detective named Mark Sinclair. The series heavily featured police photography, a novel technique at the time, as a recurring motif. The series included more than 500 stories and was published in The Australian Journal between 1868 and 1908. It was sometimes implied that "W. W." had taken the stories from the journals of her deceased husband, "a well-known detective". The title of the series referred to the protagonist's collection of mugshots. Reprinted works from the series would continue to appear in The Australian Journal until 1919.

In 1871 Fortune's only book was published—a collection of seven recently published stories taken from The Detective's Album. It is likely that only a few hundred copies were ever printed, and only two copies are known to have survived; their value has been estimated at $25,000–$60,000. The book is 114 pages long and was sold for one shilling. The Detective's Album was the world's first published collection of detective stories written by a woman, and was Australia's first published collection of crime stories.

=== Journalism and autobiography ===
Fortune wrote at least 17 short pieces of autobiographical writing and one six-part serial memoir. Most of her shorter autobiographical pieces were published between 1868 and 1871 and centre on her arrival in Melbourne. The first, "Fourteen Days on the Roads", described her journey to the city. Her later autobiographical serial Twenty-Six Years Ago was published in 1882–83 and recounts her earlier experiences living on the goldfields. The scholar Alice Michel has written that Fortune's goldfields memoirs provide an uncommon female perspective on the traditionally male setting of the gold rush settlement, illustrating how the itinerant lifestyle and the lack of separation between the public and private spheres was experienced by women.

=== Serial novels ===
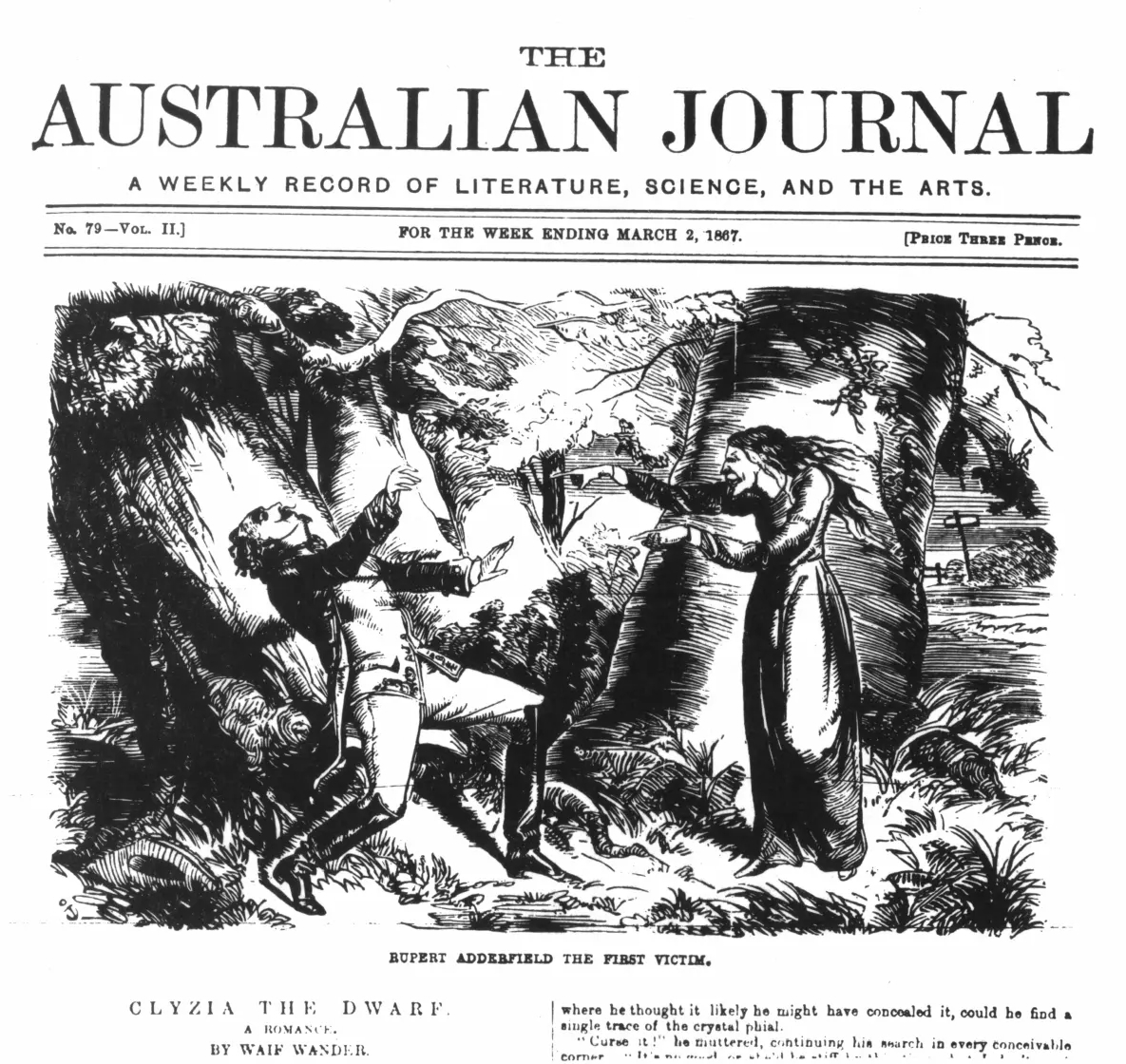
Clyzia the Dwarf by Mary Fortune, published in The Australian Journal in March 1867

Fortune wrote at least six serial novels during her career. Four of these—Bertha's Legacy, Dora Carleton, The Secrets of Balbrooke, and Clyzia the Dwarf—were published in The Australian Journal in a 12-month period beginning in March 1866. In 1872 Fortune contributed another serial novel titled The Bushranger's Autobiography to the journal. She later wrote a serial titled Dan Lyons' Doom that was syndicated in a number of newspapers by the firm Cameron & Laing.

One of Fortune's serials, Dora Carleton: A Tale of Australia, was based on a recent murder in Daylesford. It depicts the hunt for the young woman's murderer and includes an early use of crime-scene photography. Its protagonist, Dora Carleton, moves to Australia after her husband fakes his death and inadvertently enters into a bigamous marriage with a squatter. She reconciles with her husband after he helps to catch the woman's murderer. Dora Carleton has been described as an example of the "sensation novel", a popular genre at the time, and incorporates elements of Gothic fiction and melodrama. It has been noted for its independent female characters and for its criticism of traditional gender roles and the limitations placed on women's independence.

Clyzia the Dwarf was Fortune's most significant work of Gothic fiction and has been described as perhaps Australia's first truly Gothic novel. The novel's titular character Clyzia is a murderous Roma witch who is seeking revenge on a heavy-drinking man who seduced her mother. Sussex and Brown have described the serial as a "glorious female revenge fantasy" featuring elements of the occult and a temperance moral.

=== Theatre and poetry ===
Fortune also wrote a number of works of poetry. Her poetry contains many "songs of labour" that reflect the radical politics of the goldfields in the years following the Eureka Rebellion. Fortune's first published piece of writing, "Song of the Gold Diggers", has been described as an example of Chartist poetry and is characterised by its use of inclusive language to describe workers as part of a collective and by the emphasis it places on worker solidarity and the value of labour. In 1995 a collection of Fortune's poetry was published under the title Cooee and Other Poems.

Fortune authored one play under her "Waif Wander" pseudonym, a Christmas pantomime co-authored by the actor James Patrick West. While little is known about the play, it was titled Harlequin Little Bo Peep, King Sing a Song of Sixpence; or, The Witch, the Giant & the Good Little Fairy of the Golden Valley and was performed in Sydney in late 1868.

== Themes and style ==
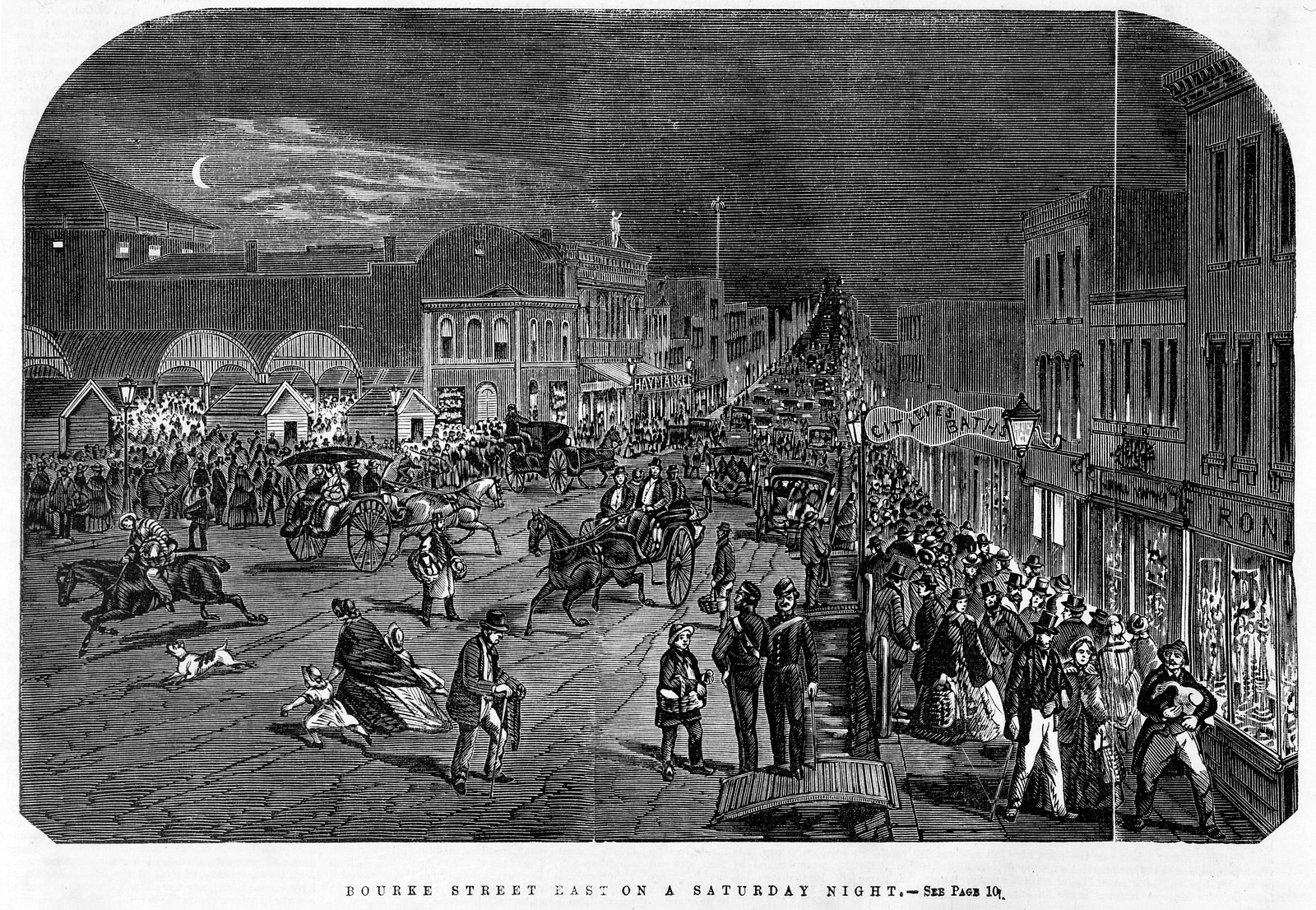
1863 illustration of Bourke Street in central Melbourne at night

Fortune was writing in the context of a rapidly growing and urbanising society that was becoming increasingly wealthy as a result of the gold rushes. Between 1851 and 1852, the population of Melbourne more than tripled to 80,000 in just one year. The scholar Stephen Knight argues that crime writing grew in popularity during this era as a way of providing reassurance to colonial readers living in a rapidly changing and sometimes chaotic society that order and justice would ultimately prevail. Fortune's stories exhibited the violent and unsettled nature of colonial Australia, and often examined the failures of the police to prevent and investigate crimes committed against women. Sexual violence, which was common and rarely prosecuted, featured prominently in her writing, as did domestic and spousal abuse. Many of her crime stories were based on events that had transpired in the often violent frontier settlements in which she had lived during her time in the goldfields. Her stories were typically written in a realist style, incorporating vivid depictions of colonial life and detailed descriptions of violence and brutality. But they also incorporated supernatural and Gothic elements, including the frequent appearance of the vengeful ghosts of female murder victims.

Scholars have described much of Fortune's writing as being written from the perspective of the flâneuse—a genre in which the writer "wanders" through a city and makes observations of urban life. Brown has argued that Fortune's urban ethnographies are distinct from much of the other writing in the genre as they express how urban environments were experienced through the unaccompanied female gaze, as opposed to the middle-class male perspective of most flâneurs. Fortune's writing drew on the work of other writers in the genre, including Charles Dickens and George Augustus Sala. Her observations of the city often criticised or subverted social structures, such as by emphasising the position of women and the urban poor in the public sphere.

Fortune's writing also featured political messaging. While Australia gave women somewhat more freedom than the societies from which most of its inhabitants had immigrated, expectations of domesticity and respectability were still strong. Fortune's stories often imply a need to abandon "old world" standards of respectability and embrace new modes of colonial womanhood. Brown has argued that Fortune's autobiographical writing and journalism demonstrate a tension between Fortune's desire to be accepted as a respectable woman, while simultaneously asserting her independence and rejecting the standards imposed by colonial society. Her writing also included temperance messaging and criticism of restrictive women's fashion. During the later part of her writing career, after her son's imprisonment, many of her stories also began to examine prisons and their effect on society.

Another major theme of Fortune's writing was the nature of identity in the Australian colonies. Brown has written that Fortune had a "preoccupation with the transitional nature of identity in the colonies". Her writing frequently featured characters who adopt new identities or shed their status or familial connections after moving to Australia, where social ties were weaker and social structures were more fluid. Themes of bigamy, illegitimacy, secrets, and assumed identities feature prominently in her writing. In one story, Fortune uses a cross-dresser to symbolise the fluidity of identity and respectability in Australia. Brown writes that this story expresses her readership's concern with the possibility of deception and the boundaries between male and female spheres amid the "dislocation" of living in a rapidly growing and urbanising settler colony.

== Legacy and identity ==
Despite her anonymity, Fortune was a well-regarded writer during her life. In 1898 Fortune was described in Table Talk as "the best detective story writer" in Australia and as "probably the only truly Bohemian lady writer who has ever earned a living by her pen in Australia". The journalist Henry Mitchell wrote in 1880 that if Fortune had "lived in England and America, where literary talent is properly appreciated, she would have, years ago, been regarded as a leading novelist, and have occupied the proud position that merit demands." Mitchell described her as "one of the most talented, versatile and interesting writers of fiction that we have, or ever had, in the Australian colonies". Her writing likely also inspired the works of other crime writers of her era, including Fergus Hume's best-selling The Mystery of a Hansom Cab. During the 1880s and 1890s, a prize-winning horse and racing greyhound were both named "Waif Wander" in reference to her pseudonym.

There were attempts during Fortune's writing career to uncover her identity; in 1880, an article in the Avoca Free Press apologised to the newspaper's readers for failing to solve the mystery of the identity of "Waif Wander". Sussex has suggested that Fortune's scandalous background—including her bigamy, her illegitimate child, and her son's criminal history—may have contributed to her decision to remain anonymous. Fortune's identity was not rediscovered until the 1950s by the collector of rare books John Kinmont Moir. Moir acquired a copy of The Detective's Album and was eventually able to track down a letter that contained its author's name. He later acquired a collection of Fortune's papers from her friend Minaille Furlong and donated them to the State Library of Victoria.

Most details of Fortune's life remained unknown until her work began to be examined by Sussex in the 1980s. Sussex eventually wrote a PhD dissertation, a book, and a novel on her research into the life of Fortune and other early Australian female crime writers. Over the course of the following decades, Sussex and other researchers gradually uncovered more details of Fortune's life. In 2025 Sussex and Brown published a biography of Fortune and her son titled Outrageous Fortunes.

== Selected works ==
=== Serial novels ===
- Bertha's Legacy (1866)
- Dora Carleton: A Tale of Australia (1866)
- The Secrets of Balbrooke: A Tale (1866)
- Clyzia the Dwarf: A Romance (1866)
- The Bushranger's Autobiography (1871)
- Dan Lyons' Doom (1884)

=== Short story collections ===
- The Detective's Album: Tales of the Australian Police (1871)
- The Fortunes of Mary Fortune, edited by Lucy Sussex (Penguin Books, 1989) ISBN 978-0-14-012302-9
- Three Murder Mysteries, edited by Lucy Sussex (Mulini Press, 2009) ISBN 978-0-9805455-8-6
- Nothing but Murders and Bloodshed and Hanging, edited by Lucy Sussex and Megan Brown (Verse Chorus Press, 2025) ISBN 978-1-959163-09-1

=== Poetry collection ===
- Cooee and Other Poems, edited by Victor Crittenden (Mulini Press, 1995) ISBN 978-0-949910-61-5
