= Teresa Edgerton =

Author

- Born: 1949 (age 76–77); Van Nuys, California, United States
- Occupation: Author
- Writing career
- Pen name: Madeline Howard
- Genres: Fantasy, steampunk, fantasy of manners
- Website: teresaedgerton.com

Teresa Edgerton (born 1949) is an author of fantasy novels and short stories set in worlds that parallel the Middle Ages and the 18th century.

== Literary biography ==
Born Teresa Ann Waller in Van Nuys, California, in 1949, she lived in the Los Angeles area until the age of 14, when her family moved to northern California. In high school, she spent her lunch hours in the school library, devouring one historical novel after another. At about that same time she discovered fantasy writers T. H. White, J. R. R. Tolkien and C. S. Lewis, and science fiction writer Andre Norton, whose combined influence would inspire her to begin creating imaginary worlds of her own. She met her husband, John Edgerton, in 1971, when she was working as a Tarot reader at a local Renaissance faire, and he was part of a Society for Creative Anachronism troupe putting on demonstrations of medieval tourney combat. They have four children. She and her husband live in the San Francisco Bay Area.

Her interest in medieval society, alchemy, magic, and Celtic mythology led her to begin writing the Green Lion Trilogy. The first book of the series, Child of Saturn, was a finalist for the Compton Crook Award. It is set in Celydonn, a fictional Celtic realm.

After completing this trilogy, her interest turned from epic fantasy to the pseudo-sciences of the 18th century, which resulted in the steampunkish fantasy of manners Goblin Moon. Other books and short stories followed.

However, publication of The Queen's Necklace didn't produce enough sales to satisfy her publishers, and for a time she was unable to renew her publishing contract. In 2004 she was offered the chance to relaunch under the pseudonym Madeline Howard, and has since started a new trilogy, Rune of the Unmaking, with the first novel, The Hidden Stars.

== Published works ==
=== Novels ===
The Queen's Necklace (2001)

==== Celydonn ====
===== The Green Lion trilogy (the first Celydonn trilogy) =====
1. Child of Saturn (1989)
2. The Moon in Hiding (1989)
3. The Work of the Sun (1990)

===== Second Celydonn trilogy =====
1. The Castle of the Silver Wheel (1993)
2. The Grail and the Ring (1994)
3. The Moon and the Thorn (1995)

==== Mask and Dagger duology ====
1. Goblin Moon (1991)
2. The Gnome's Engine (1991)

==== The Rune of Unmaking series (writing as Madeline Howard) ====
1. The Hidden Stars (2004)
2. A Dark Sacrifice (2007)

=== Short stories ===
- "The Ghost in the Chimney" (1991)
- "Titania, or The Celestial Bed" (1994)
- "My Soul into the Boughs" (1995)
- "A Wreath of Pale Flowers for Vitri" (1996)
- "Tower of Brass" (1997)
- "Rogue's Moon" (1997)
- "Dying by Inches" (2001)
- "Captured in Silver" (2004)
