= Terraplane (novel) =

1988 novel by Jack Womack

- First edition
- Author: Jack Womack
- Cover artist: David Shannon
- Language: English
- Series: Dryco series
- Genre: Speculative fiction, Dystopian novel, Alternate history novel
- Publisher: Weidenfeld & Nicolson
- Publication date: October 1988
- Publication place: United States
- Media type: Print (Hardcover)
- Pages: 227
- ISBN: 1-55584-165-1
- OCLC: 17764181
- Dewey Decimal: 813/.54 19
- LC Class: PS3573.O575 T4 1988
- Preceded by: Ambient
- Followed by: Elvissey

Terraplane, published in 1988, is a Jack Womack science fiction novel. The Terraplane is a 1930s automobile, which plays a significant role in this novel. It is also a time machine from the corporate-dominated future of DryCo, a manipulative multinational corporation in "New" New York City, 2033 CE. In this future, climate change has resulted in rising sea levels, and would have inundated the original city if it had not been for the massive construction of a giant seawall, and New New York on higher ground. Altogether, Jack Womack set six novels in this future world, and its alternate history liaisons.

== Plot summary ==
DryCo has sent two operatives, retired African-American general Luther and his white bodyguard Jake, to post-communist Moscow, where rival multinational corporation Krasnaya dominates Russian society through consumer capitalist mass production of products. However, Luther and Jake discover that Krasnaya has two highly advanced quantum physicists under duress, Oktobriana Osipova and Alekine. The two Dryco mercenaries manage to abduct Oktobriana, but their escape sends them back to 1939 in a conservative alternate history.

In this world, Abraham Lincoln was killed by a Baltimore pro-slavery mob in 1861 CE, so the American Civil War never happened, and Theodore Roosevelt abolished slavery in 1907 due to European pressure on J.P. Morgan, who feared loss of his European financial assets. On February 15, 1933, Giuseppe Zangara assassinated Franklin Delano Roosevelt, and Winston Churchill died from a car accident in 1931. As a result of Roosevelt's premature death, it is noted that John Nance Garner proved to be a fiscal conservative, leading to a situation where much of the western United States had to threaten civil war to obtain economic relief from the ongoing Depression. As the novel progresses, Alekhine, actually a Krasnaya operative, abducts Joseph Stalin from Moscow, to be transferred to Krasnaya custody and kept in a dacha, in a future which has abandoned communism and uses the image of "Big Boy" as nostalgic consumer iconography.

When this world eventually does undergo its World War II, it is assumed that there will be no effective opposition to Nazi Germany from its Soviet Union or United Kingdom as a result. However, as is disclosed in the novel's sequel, Elvissey, this is an incorrect assumption.

Luther and Jake make the acquaintance of Norman Quarles, an African American doctor and his wife, Wanda, but their presence attracts the suspicions of (unseen) J. Edgar Hoover, who sends FBI agents in pursuit. During the chase, Norman is killed, and Oktobriana contracts Dovlatov's Syndrome, a mutated influenza virus that emerged in Irkutsk, Siberia in 1909, and led to the deaths of Queen Alexandra, US House Speaker William Dean Howells, Charlie Chaplin, Christy Mathewson, French Premier Clemenceau, Claude Debussy, Guillaume Apollinaire and Amedeo Modigliani, amongst others, during the ten-year space of this epidemic. Ultimately, Luther and Wanda return to Dryco's future, while Oktobriana and Jake are lost in the interdimensional void. Luther and Wanda spend the rest of their lives together, with a coda that takes place several decades later, just after her death.

As an aside, Luther notes that there are sects described as the Albigensian Church of Jesus the Light, Reformed and the Valentinian House of God in this world, which implies the survival of gnosticism has occurred in this timeline. Amongst the books cited in the Albigensian Bible are the Gospel of Matthew, Gospel of Mark, Gospel of Luke and the Acts of the Apostles, but this gnostic bible also includes the Gospel of Thomas, Gospel of Truth, and the Hymn of Light. The latter revelation will play an important role in Womack's next novel, Elvissey.

== Publication history ==
- 1988, USA, Weidenfeld & Nicolson ISBN 1-55584-165-1, Pub date October 1988, Hardback
- 1998, USA, Grove Press ISBN 0-8021-3562-5, Pub date April 1998, Paperback

== Sources, references, external links, quotations ==
- Review by eNotes.com
- Preview on Google Books
