= Elvissey =

1993 novel by Jack Womack

- First edition (US)
- Author: Jack Womack
- Cover artist: John Berkey
- Language: English
- Series: Dryco series
- Genre: Speculative fiction, Dystopian novel, Alternate history novel
- Publisher: Tor Books (US); HarperCollins (UK)
- Publication date: 1993
- Publication place: United States
- Media type: Print (Hardcover & Paperback)
- Pages: 319
- ISBN: 0-312-85202-9
- OCLC: 35174878
- Dewey Decimal: 813/.54 20
- LC Class: PS3573.O575 E48 1997
- Preceded by: Terraplane
- Followed by: Random Acts of Senseless Violence

Elvissey (1993) is a Jack Womack science fiction novel, one of his Dryco series, set in a dystopian 2033 CE. This fictional universe is dominated by Dryco, a Machiavellian multinational corporation which pursues its plans for global domination of its world, amidst runaway climate change, unstable weather patterns and rising sea levels, which threaten to eventually inundate old New York (although DryCo has constructed a "New" New York on higher ground). It won a Philip K. Dick Award in its year of publication.

== Plot summary ==
In this novel, DryCo is facing problems from a mass religious movement centered on the premise that Elvis Presley was a semi divine figure, who performed miracles for believers in his sect. It decides to resolve this problem by retrieving a younger alternate history Elvis, and bringing him to present day New New York to discredit the posthumous reputation and mythology that now surrounds Elvis.

The retrieval team are a married couple, Iz and John. Iz is actually an African American, although cosmetic surgery has led to an uncomfortable masquerade as a "Caucasian" woman in the chosen alternate history. It turns out to be the alternate history of Terraplane, the previous novel in the DryCo quartet, where Abraham Lincoln was prematurely assassinated in early 1861, the American Civil War never took place, and slavery was only abolished by Theodore Roosevelt in 1907. Therefore, this world is backward when it comes to the civil rights movement and racist segregation is still widespread there.

In Terraplane (1989), it was hinted that the assassination of Franklin Delano Roosevelt by Giuseppe Zangara in 1933, Winston Churchill's death in a car accident in 1931, and the abduction of Joseph Stalin would lead to a Nazi victory in its World War II. However, this envisaged outcome did not transpire. Instead, Leon Trotsky takes advantage of the power vacuum in the post-Stalinist Soviet Union, returns from exile in Mexico, and assumes power in his stead. Therefore, there is still a Nazi-Soviet Pact, but Operation Barbarossa does not occur because the USSR rearms to the same extent as Nazi Germany. Moreover, Trotsky declares war on Nazi Germany before it can launch Barbarossa to its east and betray the Nazi-Soviet Pact in 1941. In the Pacific theater, the United States defeats Japan in 1946, but they do so through dropping fourteen atomic bombs on the Home Islands, which reduces the nation to an irradiated wasteland. Meanwhile, Hitler is assassinated in 1944, and the new Chancellor Albert Speer signs an armistice with the United Kingdom, the United States and the Soviet Union, which leads to an unstable multi polar world due to the inconclusive result of World War II in this world.

In its 1954, the alternate Elvis turns out to be a sexual predator who has already murdered Gladys Presley when John and Iz encounter him for the first time. He then tries to rape Iz, much to John's anger, and displays symptoms of psychosis and latent schizophrenia. His poor mental health is not assisted by his strong religious beliefs and an unexpectedly early divergence point in this world's past, where Valentinian gnosticism survived and became the dominant belief system in this alternate Southern United States instead of evangelical Christianity. This was noted in passing in Terraplane, with mention of an Albigensian Bible and a Valentinian House of God as background detail, alerting aware readers to the survival of Gnosticism in this timeline.

The dualist religious philosophy of this belief framework worsens Elvis' mental illness; as a Valentinian gnostic, his core religious beliefs are not based on messianic criteria as are those of orthodox Christianity, and he is horrified at the demand of DryCo that he become a virtual messiah that they can use to manipulate the Elvisian faith. He comprehends this as prompting that he become an instrument of the demiurge, the evil and flawed creator of the material world in his gnostic world view. Due to this psychological pressure, his psychosis escalates after he is transferred to Dryco's homeworld. However, his masquerade collides with scepticism at a London "ElCon" (Elvis Convention) religious gathering and there is a riot. Iz, John and Elvis use bootleg DryCo time travel technology to travel back to London in the alternate world's forties and Elvis loses himself amidst the debris of St Paul's Cathedral.

However, Elvis is relatively psychologically healthy and morally sane compared to the intense anti-human pathology of DryCo's world; in the end he risks everything to escape it.

DryCo's plan has failed. Although John and Iz are sacked from DryCo Central, DryCo Europe offers Iz a position within their local hierarchy. John commits suicide in the bath, and is persuaded by Iz (frightened for her own life, and that of her fetus) that she intends to join him moments later; she does not. Dying, John becomes aware that she deceived him and intends to remain behind and continue living during his last cognizant moment. He communicates non-verbally that he understands, although whether he believes in the end that the child is his own is unclear. Iz has survived, but at great personal cost.

== Publication history ==
- 1993, US, Tor Books, ISBN 0-312-85202-9, Pub date January 1993, Paperback
- 1993, UK, HarperCollins, ISBN 0-246-13839-4, Pub date February 1993, Hardback
- 1993, UK, HarperCollins, ISBN 0-586-21301-5, Pub date October 1993, Paperback
- 1997, US, Grove Press, ISBN 0-8021-3495-5, Pub date January 1997, Paperback

== Sources, references, external links, quotations ==
- Review by eNotes.com
- Preview on Google Books
