= Outrageous Fortunes =

2025 book by Lucy Sussex and Megan Brown

- Author: Lucy Sussex; Megan Brown
- Genre: Biography
- Publisher: La Trobe University Press
- Publication date: 11 February 2025
- Publication place: Australia
- Pages: 336
- ISBN: 9781760645052

Outrageous Fortunes is a 2025 biography of Mary Fortune and her son George Fortune by Lucy Sussex and Megan Brown. It was reviewed in Australian Historical Studies, The Australian, The Sydney Morning Herald, and Australian Book Review.

== Reception ==
In her review in Australian Historical Studies, the scholar Rachel Franks wrote that the biography was a testament to what could be achieved through archival research, and that while some readers might be overwhelmed by its level of detail, the book would appear to both popular and scholarly audiences. In Australian Book Review, the writer Kerryn Goldsworthy wrote that the book was well-written and underpinned by "scrupulous scholarship". She noted, however, that the divergent paths of Mary's and George's lives meant that the two stories did not always fit together into a cohesive whole. In The Australian, Charles Wooley described the book as "dense and wandering" and wrote that it made for an engrossing read.
