= Interstitial art =

Art of basic nature

Interstitial art is any work of art the basic nature of which falls between, rather than within, the familiar boundaries of accepted genres or media, thus making the work difficult to categorize or describe within a single artistic discipline.

== Concept of interstitiality ==
The word interstitial means "between spaces", and is commonly used to denote "in-betweenness" in several different cultural contexts. Architects refer to the leftover gaps between building walls as "interstitial space", being neither inside any room nor outside the building. Medical doctors have used the term for hundreds of years to refer to a space within the human body that lies in between blood vessels and organs, or in between individual cells. Television station programmers refer to any short piece of content that is neither a show nor a commercial, but is sandwiched between them, as "an interstitial". In literary theory, interstitial works are those that fall between established genres or forms.

== Interstitial arts movement ==
In the mid-1990s, Delia Sherman, Ellen Kushner, Terri Windling, Heinz Insu Fenkl, Midori Snyder, Kelly Link, Gavin Grant, Gregory Frost, Theodora Goss, Veronica Schanoes, Carolyn Dunn, Colson Whitehead, and other American writers interested in fantastic literature found themselves commiserating over the common perception that the genre-oriented publishing industry found it difficult to market truly innovative fiction involving unusual, fantastical, or cross-genre elements—because the mainstream literary fiction field demanded stories based in realism, while the fantasy field demanded stories that mostly followed the standard conventions of sword and sorcery or high fantasy. Yet it seemed to the authors that some of the best literature was that which did not quite fit tidily into either category but instead was being discussed in terms of more amorphous, "in-between" descriptors such as "magic realism", "mythic fiction", or "the New Weird". Further, the idea of interstitiality applied to other kinds of "in-between" fiction (unrelated to fantasy) and other "in-between" arts.

Over a period of several years, Kushner and Sherman prompted ongoing discussion about the importance of cultivating artistic "in-betweenness" led to the formulation of the broad concept of interstitial art. In 2002, literary scholar Heinz Insu Fenkl founded ISIS: The Interstitial Studies Institute at the State University of New York at New Paltz, and in 2003–04, Sherman and Kushner and some of their colleagues established the Interstitial Arts Foundation, a 501c(3) nonprofit organization dedicated to developing community and support for artists, arts-industry professionals and audiences whose creative pursuits are interstitial in nature.

== Projects ==
=== Interfictions ===
In 2007, the Interstitial Arts Foundation published an anthology of interstitial fiction through Small Beer Press titled Interfictions. It features 19 stories from new and established writers in the US, Canada, Australia, and the UK, and fiction translated from Spanish, Hungarian, and French. The anthology strives to "change your mind about what stories can and should do as they explore the imaginative space between conventional genres".

The anthology raised several questions and started many debates on the nature of interstitiality as applied to fiction. Reviewers raised the question of how important the definition, or lack thereof, was to understanding the anthology as a whole and the stories individually. "The 19 stories contained within Interfictions serve as examples but not as points of an argument that could lead to a listing in a Funk and Wagnalls."

Though many of the stories are written by science fiction, fantasy, and horror writers and contain fantastic or supernatural elements, Interfictions is not a genre anthology. "...interstitial fiction mixes and matches these precepts—ghost stories, science fiction, nursery rhymes, detective story, whatever may be handy—as part of a variegated prism to focus on the psychology of existence even while bending its collectively recognized state. ...each 'interfiction' shares this sense of disjointed narrative, but in very different ways that do not lend themselves to easy genre categorization."
