= Future Generation =

Studio album by Laserdance
- Released: 1987
- Genre: Spacesynth
- Length: 39:29 (Original); 46:09 (1987 Galaxis edition)
- Label: Hotsound Records (LP 1987, 1991); ZYX Music (CD 2001, 2011)
- Producer: Erik van Vliet; Michiel Van Der Kuy

Laserdance chronology
Future Generation (1987)	Around the Planet (1988)

Singles from Future Generation
- 1. "Goody's Return" Released: 1984; 2. "Humanoid Invasion" Released: 1986; 3. "Power Run" Released: 1987

Future Generation is the first studio album by Dutch project Laserdance. Originally released as LP record by Hotsound Records in 1987, the album was composed by Michiel Van Der Kuy and produced by Erik van Vliet. It was released as CD album by Galaxis in 1987 and later ZYX Music in 2001. Future Generation contains rearrangements of Laserdance's previously released singles Power Run, Humanoid Invasion and Goody's Return, while the album also features new tracks.

Being the first studio album, Future Generation was considered a big success for the project with approximately 150,000 copies being sold. Michiel Van Der Kuy has stated Future Generation is his favorite Laserdance album.

There are different releases of Future Generation album, which some of them have extra content. Galaxis' CD edition from 1987 adds remixed version of Fear as bonus track from separated single that was released in the same year, while the Polish 1991 CD release with "Snake's Music" label also adds the first Laserdance Megamix and You And Me (Space Mix) from the separated single release to the album. In 2013 The Digital Edition of the album was released. It is more commonly found on streaming services and includes a couple of additional remixes and some original 12" versions.

== Track listing ==
All tracks are written by Michiel Van Der Kuy.

No.	Title	Length
1.	"Power Run"	4:37
2.	"Humanoid Invasion"	4:15
3.	"Space Dance"	4:20
4.	"Goody's Return"	4:18
5.	"Future Generation"	4:45
6.	"Digital Dream"	5:18
7.	"Fear"	4:18
8.	"Laser Fear"	4:49
9.	"Fear (Remix)" (Bonus track from 1987 Galaxis edition)	6:48
Total length:		46:09
