= Let's Put the Future Behind Us =

1996 novel by Jack Womack

- First edition
- Author: Jack Womack
- Language: English
- Genre: Speculative fiction novel
- Publisher: Atlantic Monthly Press
- Publication date: April 1996
- Publication place: United States
- Media type: Print (Paperback)
- Pages: 310 pp
- ISBN: 978-0-87113-627-5
- OCLC: 33281869
- Dewey Decimal: 813/.54 20
- LC Class: PS3573.O575 L48 1996

Let's Put the Future Behind Us is a speculative fiction novel by Jack Womack set in post-Soviet Russia and released in 1996. It chronicles the transition of bureaucratic apparatchiks into an endemically corrupt Russian quasi-capitalism in the early 1990s dominated by oligarchs, criminals and ultra-nationalist political groups.

The novel arose when Womack's friend and fellow author William Gibson had been collaborating on a screenplay with Kazakh director Rashid Nugmanov after an American producer had expressed an interest in a Soviet-American collaboration to star Russian-Korean singer Viktor Tsoi. Despite being occupied with writing a novel, Gibson was reluctant to abandon the "wonderfully odd project" which involved "ritualistic gang-warfare in some sort of sideways-future Leningrad" and sent Womack to Russia in his stead for a week in March 1992, immediately after the collapse of the Soviet Union. Rather than producing a motion picture, a prospect which Tsoi's death in an automotive accident put paid to, Womack's experiences in Russia ultimately culminated in the novel, which he began writing in 1994 and finished in September 1995.

The novel has been hailed by Charlie Stross as a "brilliant and vitriolically funny apocalypse geek novel about life in Russia", while Wired commended its "brilliant aperçus and well-aimed jokes", calling the novel "the best Russian gangster thriller ever written by a guy who's not Russian", and Entertainment Weekly rated it a B+.

== Publication details ==
- Womack, Jack (1996). Let's Put the Future behind Us. Boston: Atlantic Monthly Press. ISBN 978-0-87113-627-5.
