= Going, Going, Gone (novel) =

2000 novel by Jack Womack

- First edition
- Author: Jack Womack
- Language: English
- Series: Dryco series
- Genre: Speculative fiction, dystopian novel, alternate history novel
- Publisher: Voyager Books
- Publication date: 2000
- Publication place: United States
- Media type: Print (hardcover and paperback)
- Pages: 218 pp
- ISBN: 0-00-651105-8
- OCLC: 44969180
- Dewey Decimal: 813/.54 21
- LC Class: PS3573.O575 G65 2000
- Preceded by: Random Acts of Senseless Violence

Going, Going, Gone is a 2000 alternate history novel by American writer Jack Womack. As the sixth and final installment of his acclaimed Dryco series, the novel was the subject of much anticipation and speculation prior to its release, and was critically well received.

== Plot summary ==
Set in 1968 New York City in an alternate universe differing from the Dryco universe established in the previous five iterations of the series, Going, Going, Gone nevertheless disposes of several of the series' characters in its closing chapters. Its protagonist is Walter Bullitt, an egocentric expert in psychoactive substances who freelances for various branches of the increasingly Nazi-influenced United States government spy apparatus. Though he passes for white, Bullitt is in fact of African-American descent in a USA where, as revealed in previous novels in the Dryco series, the American Civil War never took place. As a result, racial relations in this version of the USA have been much more fraught, with almost all full-blooded African Americans interned and used as slave labor during World War II before being disposed of, and by 1968 even black music has been culturally marginalized. Walter becomes subject to increasingly strange experiences, hearing voices and seeing ghosts from a parallel New York almost a century more advanced than his. Walter is taken to this alternative New York (the primary locale of the previous five Dryco novels) which, after flooding due to the Greenhouse effect, has been moved north, is populated by all races and features in its collection of futuristic wonders television, which never caught on in his world. The novel ends with the two epistemic worlds converging into a New York which is, in the words of critic Paul Dukes a "morally better place than either of the two which composed it".

== Critical reception ==
Going, Going, Gone was well-received critically. Publishers Weekly called it an "intriguing, clever novel", with the potential for crossover appeal as well as for satisfying fans of the series. Biopunk author and reviewer Paul Di Filippo hailed the work as a groundbreaking achievement:

What Womack has done here is something special. He has fashioned an homage, a pastiche, a parody that far transcends its original model. Starting with the sub-James-Bond genre of swinging superstud spies a la Donald Hamilton's Matt Helm and Michael Avallone's Ed Noon, Womack builds a credible, touching and alluring alternate history limned not by expository lumps but by scattered remarks and observations from the first-person narrator.

Publishers Weekly compared the novel's prose with that of Anthony Burgess, but conjectured that the vernacular "may annoy some readers". The Magazine of Fantasy and Science Fiction also singled out Womack's prose for attention, commenting:

Womack slides his compact, playful, sardonic prose past the reading eye, sequinning his narrative with wry observations and a peculiar vocabulary, and rendering with exquisite economy a world so nearly our own (though not) that it's more meaningful than the one we inhabit. Going, Going, Gone mutes its sf armature, preferring the subtle to the spectacular, but it delivers the double-take brain thrill that true lovers of the form crave.

== See also ==
- The Man in the High Castle, a similar alternate history novel by Philip K. Dick
- Slipstream, a genre which crosses speculative and literary fiction
