= The Privilege of the Sword =

2006 fantasy novel by Ellen Kushner

- Cover art for the first edition
- Author: Ellen Kushner
- Cover artist: Marc Peltzer and Stephen Youll
- Series: Riverside
- Release number: 3
- Genre: Fantasy
- Publisher: Bantam Spectra
- Publication date: July 25, 2006
- Publication place: United States
- Pages: 378 (1st ed.)
- Award: Locus Award for Best Fantasy Novel
- ISBN: 978-0-553-38268-6
- Preceded by: The Fall of the Kings

The Privilege of the Sword is a fantasy novel by American author Ellen Kushner. First published in 2006 by Bantam Spectra, the novel won the 2007 Locus Award and was nominated for both the Nebula Award for Best Novel and the Gaylactic Spectrum Award in 2007. Although part of a series, the book also serves as a stand-alone.

== Plot ==
Katherine Talbert, a young country girl from good origin, is invited by her uncle, the Mad Duke of Riverside, to come as a guest to his house in the capital, where he decides it would be more amusing for his niece to learn swordplay than to follow the usual path to marriage. As her world changes forever, Katherine must navigate into a world filled with secrets and scoundrels. It is not immediately clear what her Uncle really wants from her. She was always told that the Duke hated her family, so when he makes her look ridiculous in front of the city by letting her dress like a boy and swing a sword, Katherine is determined not to let him ruin her future.

== Reception ==
The Privilege of the Sword was well received by critics, winning the 2007 Locus Award for Best Fantasy Novel. It was also nominated for the 2007 Nebula Award and the 2007 Gaylactic Spectrum Award. Robert N. Tilendis from Green Man Review said in his review, "If it predecessor Swordspoint is a perfect gem, The Privilege of the Sword is the gem in its full setting: elegant, wicked, funny, intelligent, and fluent."

== Riverside series ==
- Swordspoint (1987)
- The Fall of the Kings (2002) (co-authored with Delia Sherman)
- The Privilege of the Sword (2006)
- The Man with the Knives (2010)
