= The Horns of Elfland =

1997 anthology edited by Ellen Kushner, Delia Sherman and Donald G. Keller

- The Horns of Elfland first edition cover.
- Author: Ellen Kushner, Delia Sherman, Donald G. Keller (editors)
- Cover artist: Ed Gazsi
- Language: English
- Genre: Fantasy, anthology
- Publisher: Roc Books
- Publication date: April 1997
- Publication place: United States
- Media type: Print (Paperback)
- Pages: 347 pp (first edition)
- ISBN: 0-451-45599-1

The Horns of Elfland is a 1997 fantasy anthology edited by Ellen Kushner, Delia Sherman and Donald G. Keller.

== Background ==
The Horns of Elfland was first published in April 1997 by Roc Books in paperback format. It was a nominee in the 1998 Locus Awards for best anthology, finishing eighth out of 17. The Horns of Elfland features 15 stories from 15 authors. One of the stories, "Merlusine" by Lucy Sussex, won the 1997 Aurealis Award for best fantasy short story. "Audience" by Jack Womack was a short-list nominee in 1998 World Fantasy Awards but lost to "Dust Motes" by P. D. Cacek. "Flash Company" by Gene Wolfe finished 17th in the 1998 Locus Awards for best short story and John Brunner's "The Drummer and the Skins" tied for sixth in the 1997 Interzone Poll.

== Contents ==
- Acknowledgements by Ellen Kushner
- Introduction by Donald G. Keller
- "Solstice", short story by Jennifer Stevenson
- "The New Tiresias", novelette by Doris Egan (as Jane Emerson)
- "Josh and the Fairy Melodeon Player", short story by Gus Smith
- "Audience", short story by Jack Womack
- "The Bellcaster's Apprentice", novelette by Elizabeth E. Wein
- "Sacred Harp", short story by Delia Sherman
- "Done by the Forces of Nature", novelette by Ray Davis
- "Acolytes", short story by Michael Kandel
- "Flash Company", short story by Gene Wolfe
- "Merlusine", novelette by Lucy Sussex
- "The Drummer and the Skins", novelette by John Brunner
- "Aïda in the Park", novelette by Susan Palwick
- "Brandy for the Damned", short story by Roz Kaveney
- "The Color of Angels", novelette by Terri Windling
- "The Death of Raven", short story by Ellen Kushner
- Author Biographies
