= Ambient (novel) =

1987 novel by Jack Womack

- First edition
- Author: Jack Womack
- Cover artist: David Shannon
- Language: English
- Series: Dryco series
- Genre: Cyberpunk, dystopian novel
- Publisher: Weidenfeld & Nicolson
- Publication date: 1987
- Publication place: United States
- Media type: Print (hardcover and paperback)
- Pages: 259 pages
- ISBN: 1-55584-082-5
- OCLC: 13822815
- Dewey Decimal: 813/.54 19
- LC Class: PS3573.O575 A8 1987
- Followed by: Terraplane

Ambient is the dystopian debut novel of cyberpunk writer Jack Womack, the first in his Dryco series. Published in 1987, it was translated into Slovak by Michal Hvorecký, and has a significant cult following. Actor Bruce Willis optioned the novel, and renewed the option in 1995 (thus enabling Womack to quit his "day job").
