= Ambiancé =

Experimental film

- Directed by: Anders Weberg
- Written by: Anders Weberg
- Produced by: Anders Weberg
- Starring: Niclas Hallberg, Stina Pehrsdotter
- Cinematography: Anders Weberg
- Edited by: Anders Weberg
- Music by: Marsen Jules

Ambiancé was an unreleased experimental film directed by Swedish director Anders Weberg.

The film was expected to have a running time of 720 hours (or 30 days) and initially had a projected release date of 31 December 2020. Once the film's initial screening was completed, Weberg would destroy the only existent copy of the entire movie, which he said made it "the longest film made that doesn't exist". He has also stated that this was his final film. It would have been the second longest film ever made after Logistics.

== Development and release ==
Weberg has stated that he made Ambiancé as a protest against the re-creation of old, classic films.

In 2016, Weberg claimed to have completed 400 hours of footage, and that in order to complete the film by its release date he must film 7 to 8 hours of raw footage each week. Weberg released two trailers for the film. The first of which was released in 2014 and is 72 minutes long, and the second trailer in 2016 which is 439 minutes (7 hours and 19 minutes) long, consisting of a single take with no cuts. He had stated that he would release a 72-hour trailer in 2018, but that never came to fruition.

Although Ambiancé was scheduled to screen on 31 December 2020, this never happened.

On 3 January 2021, Weberg posted the phrase "C'est fini", French for "It is finished," on his Twitter account and on the official site for the film. This was used in the description of the film's trailer in relation to Weberg quitting directing after having finished Ambiancé. Weberg's own website lists the film in its filmography, listing a runtime of 43,200 minutes, which totals to exactly 30 days.
