= Fantasy of manners =

Subgenre of fantasy literature

The fantasy of manners is a subgenre of fantasy literature that also partakes of the nature of a comedy of manners (though it is not necessarily humorous). Such works generally take place in an urban setting and within the confines of a fairly elaborate, and almost always hierarchical, social structure. The term was first used in print by science fiction critic Donald G. Keller in an article, The Manner of Fantasy, in the April 1991 issue of The New York Review of Science Fiction.

== Characteristics ==
=== Original definition ===
Keller used the term to describe a group of American fantasy writers who emerged in the 1980s, including Steven Brust, Emma Bull, Ellen Kushner, Delia Sherman, Caroline Stevermer, and Terri Windling; Kushner suggested the name. These writers were influenced by television, children's literature, and the works of Jane Austen, Georgette Heyer, and Dorothy Dunnett; in fantasy fiction, Fritz Leiber was important, as were Michael Moorcock and M. John Harrison. Their works included themes of negotiating social structures, disguise, the importance of childhood, the necessity of self-discovery, and the importance of manners and especially of language. This emphasis meant that their characters' speech tended to be more important than their actions, and they used a wide range of diction. After the article was released, fantasy of manners was nicknamed "mannerpunk".

=== Modern definition ===
In the words of author Teresa Edgerton, the term has since taken on a life of its own. It began to mean fantasy literature that owes as much or more to the comedy of manners as it does to the work of J. R. R. Tolkien and other authors of high fantasy. The protagonists are not pitted against fierce monsters or marauding armies, but against their neighbors and peers; the action takes place within a society, rather than being directed against an external foe; duels may be fought, but the chief weapons are wit and intrigue; romance and emotions are central, and the plot may revolve around courtship and marriage. The way the protagonist pushes against their social constraints drives the plot. The setting is a city in another world, usually post-medieval but pre-technological. Stylistically, fantasies of manners tend to be dry and witty.

While there is occasional overlap with steampunk or gaslamp fantasy, fantasy of manners is more grounded in reality; magic, fantastic races, and legendary creatures are downplayed or dismissed entirely, and the technology is typically no more advanced than is expected of the period. Indeed, but for the fact that the settings are usually entirely fictional, some of the books considered "fantasy of manners" could be also considered historical fiction, and some do cross over with historical fantasy. The social system, with its conventions and restraints that can be mastered, replaces magic.

== Influences ==
Like the authors Keller originally described, contemporary fantasy of manners is influenced by the social novels of Jane Austen, the historical romances of Georgette Heyer, and Dorothy Dunnett's historical novels. Other major influences on the subgenre include the drawing room comedies of Oscar Wilde and P. G. Wodehouse. Many authors also draw from nineteenth century popular novelists such as Anthony Trollope, the Brontë sisters, and Charles Dickens. Traditional romances of swashbuckling adventure such as The Three Musketeers by Alexandre Dumas, The Scarlet Pimpernel by Baroness Orczy, or the works of Rafael Sabatini may also be influences. The Ruritanian romances typified by The Prisoner of Zenda by Anthony Hope, or George Barr McCutcheon's Graustark itself, are also of some consequence as literary precedents.

== Examples ==
- Half a Soul by Olivia Atwater
- Of Dragons, Feasts, and Murders by Aliette de Bodard
- Sorcerer to the Crown by Zen Cho
- Crown Duel by Sherwood Smith
- Jonathan Strange & Mr Norrell by Susanna Clarke
- The Labyrinth Gate by Kate Elliott
- The Glamourist Histories series by Mary Robinette Kowal
- Swordspoint (and related works) by Ellen Kushner
- The Beautiful Ones by Silvia Moreno-Garcia
- Titus Groan and Gormenghast by Mervyn Peake
- Tooth and Claw by Jo Walton
- Sorcery and Cecelia, The Grand Tour, and The Mislaid Magician by Patricia Wrede and Caroline Stevermer

== Relationship with other genres ==
A Civil Campaign by Lois McMaster Bujold has been described as "science fiction of manners".
