= Thomas the Rhymer (novel) =

1990 fantasy novel by Ellen Kushner

- Cover of the first edition
- Author: Ellen Kushner
- Cover artist: Thomas Canty
- Language: English
- Genre: Fantasy; fairytale
- Publisher: William Morrow & Co
- Publication date: January 1, 1990
- Publication place: United States
- Pages: 247 (1st ed.)
- Awards: Mythopoeic Award; World Fantasy Award
- ISBN: 978-1-55710-046-7

Thomas the Rhymer is a fantasy novel by American writer Ellen Kushner. It is a fairytale based on the ballad of Thomas the Rhymer, a piece of folklore in which Thomas Learmonth's love of the Queen of Elfland was rewarded with the gift of prophecy. The novel won the 1991 World Fantasy Award and Mythopoeic Award.

== Plot summary ==
Thomas, a harper from court, befriends a humble farmer and his wife. As he begins a relationship with Elspeth, their neighbor, he is whisked to Elfland, ensnared by the Fairy Queen. After seven years he returns to Gavin, Meg, and Elspeth with a parting gift from the Queen: he can only speak the truth.

== Characters ==
=== Thomas ===
A minstrel who sang in the king's court. Before he is captured by the Fairy Queen, he is a carefree young man.

=== Elspeth ===
A young woman who falls in love with Thomas. In the seven years of his absence, her hard life makes her cynical.

=== Gavin ===
A rather simple crofter who takes Thomas in.

=== The Queen of Elfland ===
Although powerful and beautiful, the Fairy Queen can be merciless. Although she releases Thomas after seven years as her lover, she never fully releases him.

=== Meg ===
Gavin's wife who sees value in Thomas and believes him when others do not.

== Awards ==
- 1991 World Fantasy Award
- 1991 Mythopoeic Award
- 2009 Tähtifantasia Award for the best foreign fantasy novel released in Finland in 2008.
