= Ambient lighting =

Ambient lighting may refer to:

- Available light in an environment
- Low-key lighting, a photographic technique using a single key light
- A type of lighting in computer graphics

== See also ==
- Ambient light sensor
- Ambiance lighting, or mood lighting
