= Swordspoint =

1987 LGBT fantasy novel by Ellen Kushner

Swordspoint: A Melodrama of Manners
- First edition cover of Swordspoint
- Author: Ellen Kushner
- Series: Riverside
- Release number: 1
- Genre: Fantasy of Manners
- Publisher: Arbor House
- Publication date: 24 February 1987
- Pages: 269
- ISBN: 9780048233523
- Preceded by: "Red Cloak"
- Followed by: "The Swordsman Whose Name Was Not Death"; The Privilege of the Sword (Note: "The Swordsman Whose Name Was Not Death" is chronologically the next story, followed by "The Duke of Riverside" and then The Privilege of the Sword. Although The Fall of the Kings was the second published Riverside novel, The Privilege of the Sword is the next novel chronologically)
- Website: https://www.ellenkushner.com/books/swordspoint/

Swordspoint: A Melodrama of Manners is a 1987 fantasy novel by Ellen Kushner. It is Kushner's debut novel and is one of several books and short stories in the Riverside series. Later editions of the novel were also bundled with three short stories set in the same universe. Swordspoint has been called a defining text of the fantasy of manners subgenre; Kushner was one of the first authors to use the phrase "fantasy of manners" to describe her own and similar works.

== Plot summary ==
Richard St Vier, a swordsman-for-hire based in the seedy neighborhood of Riverside, kills two men at a party thrown by Lord Horn. When a man intimidates Richard's lover Alec, Richard kills him as a warning to the other Riverside residents.

Lord Michael Godwin rejects the advances of Lord Horn. Michael meets Richard on the street and asks for sword lessons, but Richard declines. Michael begins taking lessons from Vincent Applethorpe. At a party, he humiliates Horn and flirts with Duchess Tremontaine, but she rejects him for Chancellor Ferris. Later that night, Ferris asks Richard to kill an opponent in a duel. He shows Richard a signet indicating that Tremontaine is also secretly supporting him. Richard meets with Katherine, an old friend, to obtain the name of his target: Crescent Chancellor Basil Halliday. Halliday has consolidated executive power for himself and is fighting to remove term limits on the Chancellorship; Ferris wants to become Crescent Chancellor himself.

An enraged Horn tries to hire Richard to kill Michael; Richard refuses. Alec is kidnapped on the orders of Lord Horn. With Alec as leverage, Horn forces Richard to challenge Michael. Applethorpe accepts the challenge in Michael's place, and Richard kills him. Duchess Tremontaine rescues Michael, who leaves town. Horn releases Alec. Richard kills two of Horn's men, then tortures and kills Horn. Alec, fearful of the manhunt Richard has brought down upon them, leaves Richard. On Ferris's orders, Katherine betrays Richard. He is arrested and put on trial. Alec joins the Chancellors, revealing himself to be the grandson of Duchess Tremontaine. He calls for an assembly of the full Council of Lords.

Alec confronts Ferris at the council, revealing that Tremontaine was not involved in the plot to kill Halliday. Ferris is forced to take credit for Horn's death in order to keep the plot against Halliday secret; he is sentenced to become the ambassador to a backwater nation. Alec rejects the dukedom and returns to Riverside to be with Richard.

== Reception ==
Swordspoint has been described as a cult classic. The novel was well-received critically, with praise for its characterization and prose. The New York Times praised the novel for its lack of magic and for challenging the moral assumptions of traditional fantasy literature. It received a positive reviews in Publishers Weekly and has received praise from fellow fantasy authors such as George R.R. Martin. In 2000, it was inducted into the Gaylactic Spectrum Awards Hall of Fame.
