= Laserdance =

Dutch italo disco studio project

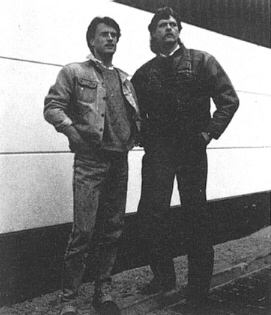
- Laserdance's two producers

Background information
- Origin: Netherlands
- Genres: Synth-pop, Italo disco, spacesynth
- Instrument(s): Synthesizer, drum machines
- Years active: 1984–1995, 2000, 2016–present
- Labels: Break Records, Hotsound Records, ZYX Music
- Members: Erik van Vliet (1984–1995, 2000, 2016–present); Michiel van der Kuy (1984–1995, 2016–present)
- Past members: Julius Wijnmalen (2000)

Laserdance is a Dutch Italo disco studio project consisting of producer Erik van Vliet and composer Michiel van der Kuy. The studio project has been categorized as part of subgenre known as spacesynth and has been generally considered as a major influence for the subgenre and has remained popular around Europe in the mid-1980s. Many of Laserdance's tracks are known to feature basic analog synthesizers, drum machines and vocoders. The name of the studio project comes from the first single with the same name published in 1984. Numerous hit singles from Laserdance include "Goody's Return", "Humanoid Invasion", "Power Run", "Fear" and "Shotgun (Into The Night)".

Van der Kuy and Van Vliet are known to be key members of the studio project, while other members such as Ruud van Es, Rob van Eijk and Julius Wijnmalen, the composer of the studio album Strikes Back from 2000, have been involved as well. The very first single of Laserdance was published in 1984, and the first album Future Generation was released in 1987 with successful sales for the studio project, generating a lot of interest towards the spacesynth genre.

== History ==
Producer Erik van Vliet started the studio project under the title "Laser Dance" in 1984, releasing the first single of the same name on Break Records, and later on Hotsound Productions. He and Fonny de Wulf (the producer of Rofo) produced the single, which was based upon the song of the same name by Sponooch from 1979. Michiel van der Kuy himself joined the project and became its composer, beginning with the second single Goody's Return in 1984.

The first Laserdance album, titled Future Generation, was released by Hotsound Records in 1987, and was a success with approximately 150,000 copies being sold. Between 1987 and 1995, Laserdance was producing new studio albums every year with numerous singles and few compilation albums being released in-between. Notably, the fifth studio album Ambiente from 1991 contains only ambient tracks, while the seventh album Hypermagic from 1993 is the only Laserdance album to be released separately on Dolby Surround.

The declining era of Italo disco in the early 1990s affected Laserdance in terms of sales, as the ninth studio album The Guardian of Forever from 1995 mixed the spacesynth with more house and trance tracks. One of the latter tracks was a cover of Humate's "Love Stimulation", accompanied by a clarifying statement that it was not composed by Van der Kuy on the CD casing. This tonal shift received cold feedback from fans, and the studio project was stopped for a few years. However, Van Vliet was planning to bring Laserdance back, while Van der Kuy was working as producer of Alice Deejay and on his own music project, Rygar. Van Vliet hired Julius Wijnmalen to be the composer of the then-recent studio album called Strikes Back, released on ZYX Music in 2000.

After the release of Strikes Back, anything about Laserdance's state had not been known or confirmed, although Van der Kuy stated in a December 2010 interview to have no plans for continuing on Laserdance while working on Rygar. At the same time, Van Vliet mentioned on Discogs that he was still looking for a "new Michiel van der Kuy" to continue Laserdance with after Wijnmalen had demanded too much money from him for another album. Eventually in April 2016, Van Vliet and Van der Kuy confirmed on social media that a new record was soon to be released. The first track from the album was premiered on Radio Stad den Haag in the Netherlands on 17 April 2016. The recent album, titled Force of Order, was released on 30 September 2016. In October 2017, Van Vliet posted an image to his Facebook account, on which he proclaimed a "new" Laserdance album Trans Space Express was being worked on, with the preliminary release date being given as April 2018. In 2019, the song "Digital Dream" was re-released as "Just Like Heaven" by Sauvage, another project by Van der Kuy. In April 2024, Laserdance released the album Mission Hyperdrive.

== Discography ==
=== Studio albums ===
- Future Generation (1987)
- Around the Planet (1988)
- Discovery Trip (1989)
- Changing Times (1990)
- Ambiente (1991)
- Technological Mind (1992)
- Hypermagic (1993)
- Fire on Earth (1994)
- The Guardian of Forever (1995)
- Strikes Back (2000)
- Force of Order (2016)
- Trans Space Express (2018)
- Mission Hyperdrive (2024)

=== Compilation albums ===
- The Maxi-CD Collection Of Laserdance (1991)
- The Best Of Laserdance (1992)
- Laserdance Orchestra vol. 1 (1994)
- Laserdance Orchestra vol. 2 (1994)
- The 12" Mixes (1995)
- Greatest Hits & Remixes (2015)

=== Singles ===
- "Laser Dance" (1984)
- "Goody's Return" (12") (1984)
- "Humanoid Invasion" (1986)
- "Power Run" (1987)
- "Fear (Remix) / Battle Cry (Remix)" (1987)
- "You & Me" (1988)
- "Shotgun (Into The Night)" (1988)
- "Laserdance ('88 Remix)" (1988)
- "Cosmo Tron" (1989)
- "The Challenge" (1990)
- "Technoid" (1992)

=== Megamixes ===
- "Megamix Vol. 1" (1988)
- "Megamix Vol. 2" (1989)
- "Megamix Vol. 3" (1990)
- "Megamix Vol. 4" (1991)

== See also ==
- Koto
