= Donald G. Keller =

American writer

Donald G. Keller (born 1951) is a science fiction and fantasy editor and critic. He was the co-founder of Serconia Press and was Managing Editor and a frequent contributor to The New York Review of Science Fiction (1990–1995), where his seminal essay on Fantasy of Manners, 'The Manner of Fantasy', appeared in 1991.

He co-edited the fantasy anthology The Horns of Elfland (1997) with Ellen Kushner and Delia Sherman. He is a contributor to John Clute's The Encyclopedia of Fantasy and is a member of the editorial board of Slayage, the online Encyclopedia of Buffy Studies.

Keller was active in science fiction and fantasy fandom from the 1970s-1990s as coeditor with Jeffrey D. Smith of the fanzine Phantasmicom, editor of the journal The Eildon Tree, and a frequent contributor to the monthly newsletter Fantasiae.
