= Ellen Kushner =

American writer (born 1955)

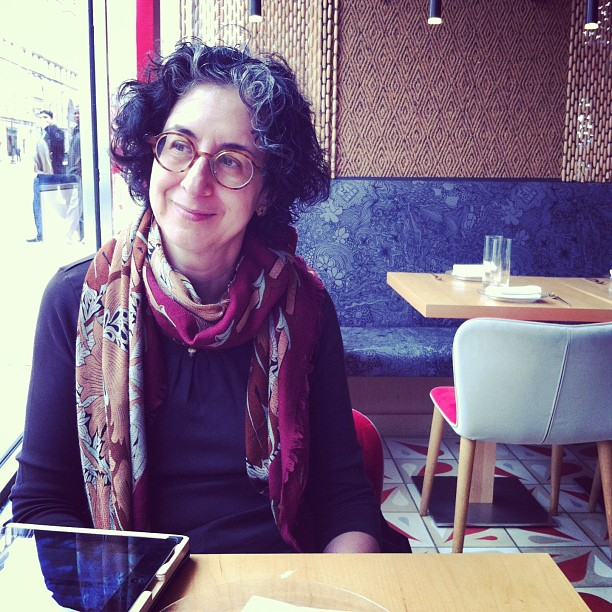
- Kushner in 2013
- Born: 1955 (age 70–71); Washington, D.C., U.S.
- Education: Barnard College
- Occupations: Editor; writer
- Spouse: Delia Sherman
- Writing career
- Genres: Speculative fiction, fantasy of manners
- Notable works: Swordspoint; Thomas the Rhymer
- Notable awards: 1991 World Fantasy Award; 1991 Mythopoeic Award; 2007 Locus Award; 2024 Skylark Award
- Website: www.ellenkushner.com

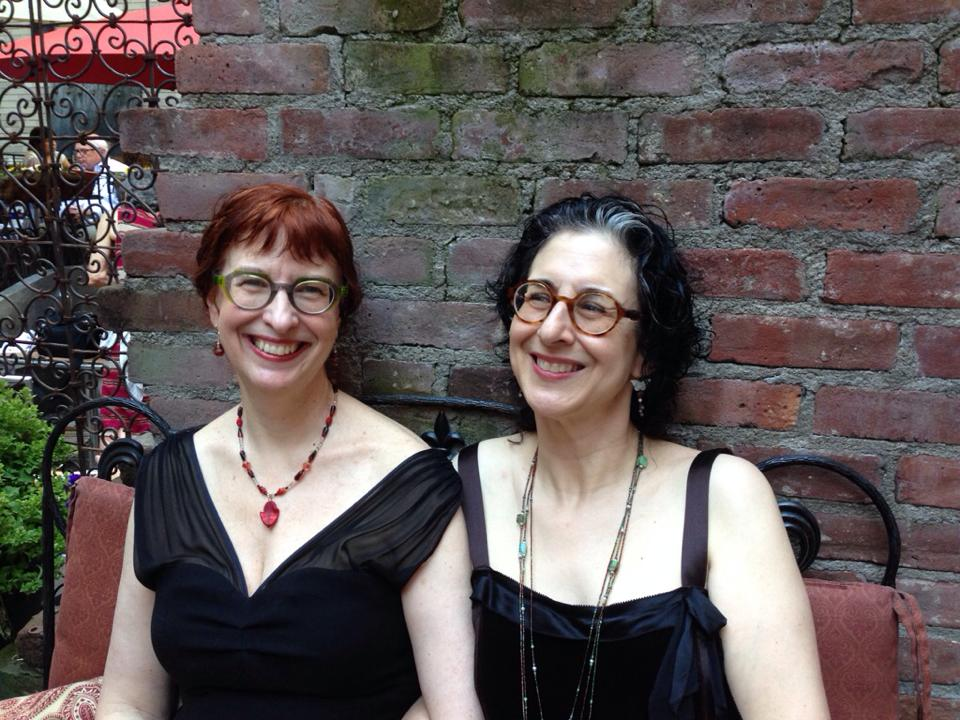
Delia Sherman (l.) and Ellen Kushner.

Ellen Kushner (born 1955) is an American editor and writer of fantasy fiction. From 1996 until 2010, she was the host of the radio program Sound and Spirit, produced by WGBH in Boston and distributed by Public Radio International.

== Background and personal life ==
Kushner was born in a Jewish family in Washington, D.C. and grew up in Cleveland, Ohio. She attended Bryn Mawr College and graduated from Barnard College. She lives in New York City with her wife and sometime collaborator, Delia Sherman. They held a wedding in 1996 and were legally married in Boston in 2004. Kushner is bisexual.

== Career ==
Kushner began her career as a fantasy editor for Tor Books. During her tenure at Tor, she wrote and published five Choose Your Own Adventure gamebooks, and in 1987 published her first novel, Swordspoint. A sequel set 18 years after Swordspoint, called The Privilege of the Sword, was published in July 2006, with a first hardcover edition published in September 2006 by Small Beer Press. The Fall of the Kings (2002) (co-authored by Sherman) is set 40 years after Swordspoint. All three books are considered mannerpunk novels and take place in a nameless imaginary capital city and its raffish district of Riverside, where swordsmen-for-hire ply their trade.

From 2011 to 2014 audiobook versions of all three novels were produced under the label of Neil Gaiman Presents. The Swordspoint adaptation won the 2013 Audie Award for Best Audio Drama, an Earphones Award from AudioFile, and the 2013 Communicator Award: Gold Award of Excellence (Audio). The adaptation of The Fall of the Kings won the 2014 Wilbur Award.

Kushner's second novel, Thomas the Rhymer, won the World Fantasy Award and the Mythopoeic Award in 1991. She has also published short stories and poetry in various anthologies, including The Year's Best Fantasy and Horror and the Borderland series of urban fantasy anthologies for teenage readers.

In 1987, Kushner relocated from New York to Boston, and began working as a presenter in radio. She worked with public radio station WBGH-FM, first hosting its all-night radio program "Night Air". In 1989 she hosted the Nakamichi International Music Series for American Public Radio (now Public Radio International), and later produced three Jewish holiday specials with APR, Festival of Liberation: the Passover Story in World Music, The Door is Open: a Jewish High Holiday Meditation, and Beyond 1492.

Beginning in 1996, Kushner wrote, programmed and hosted the series "Sound & Spirit", produced by WGBH/PRI. "Sound & Spirit" was an hour-long weekly series "exploring the human spirit through music and ideas." Episodes featured folk, classical, and world music, with a wide variety of special guests including Grateful Dead drummer Mickey Hart, religious historian Elaine Pagels, and writer Neil Gaiman. "Sound & Spirit" remained on the air until 2010.

In 2002, she released a CD of her story The Golden Dreydl: A Klezmer Nutcracker, which uses music from Pyotr Tchaikovsky's The Nutcracker to tell a Hanukkah story. The music on the CD is performed by Shirim Klezmer Orchestra. The Golden Dreydl won a Gracie Award from American Women in Radio and Television. A live theater version of The Golden Dreydl was performed in 2008 and 2009 at Vital Theater in New York City, written by Kushner (who played "Tante Miriam" in the 2008 production) and directed by Linda Ames Key.

In 2007, Kushner, along with Elizabeth Schwartz and Yale Strom, scripted the musical audio drama The Witches of Lublin for public radio. Based on the history of Jewish women who were klezmer musicians in 18th Century Europe, The Witches of Lublin premiered on radio stations nationwide in April 2011 with performances by Tovah Feldshuh and Simon Jones. It won the 2012 Wilbur Award for Best Single Program, Radio; the 2012 Grace Allen Award for Best Director, and the 2012 Gabriel Award: Arts, Local Release, Radio.

In 2011 she co-edited (with Holly Black) Welcome to Bordertown, an anthology of new stories from Terri Windling's seminal shared-world series. In an audiobook adaptation Neil Gaiman read his own work, set to an original score by Boiled in Lead's Drew Miller.

In 2015, Kushner created Tremontaine, a serialized prequel to Swordspoint, for the Serial Box platform. The series ran for four seasons.

With Sherman and others, she is actively involved in the interstitial art movement. She is the co-founder and past president of the Interstitial Arts Foundation.

She is also a member of the Endicott Studio and has taught classes and seminars as part of Hollins University's MFA program; the Odyssey Writing Workshop; and the Clarion Writers' Workshop.

== Awards ==
Awards and nominations
Award	Category	Year (Note: Year in which the award was received.)	Work	Result
Gaylactic Spectrum Awards	Hall of Fame	2000	Swordspoint	Won
Gaylactic Spectrum Awards	Novel	2003	The Fall of the Kings	Nominated
Gaylactic Spectrum Awards	Novel	2007	The Privilege of the Sword	Nominated
Gaylactic Spectrum Awards	Novel	2018	Tremontaine	Nominated
James Tiptree Jr. Award	–	2007	The Privilege of the Sword	Honor list
Locus Award	Anthology	1981	Basilisk	13th
Locus Award	Anthology	1998	The Horns of Elfland	8th
Locus Award	Anthology	2012	Welcome to Bordertown	2nd
Locus Award	Anthology	2017	Tremontaine	8th
Locus Award	Fantasy Novel	1991	Thomas the Rhymer	5th
Locus Award	Fantasy Novel	2003	The Fall of the Kings	9th
Locus Award	Fantasy Novel	2007	The Privilege of the Sword	Won
Locus Award	First Novel	1988	Swordspoint	10th
Locus Award	Novelette	2010	"A Wild and a Wicked Youth"	16th
Locus Award	Short Story	2010	"Dulce Domum"	25th
Locus Award	Short Story	2011	"The Man with the Knives"	12th
Locus Award	Short Story	2011	"The Children of Cadmus"	27th
Locus Award	Short Story	2022	"Immortal Coil"	29th
Mythopoeic Award	Adult Literature	2003	The Fall of the Kings	Nominated
Mythopoeic Award	Fantasy	1991	Thomas the Rhymer	Won
Nebula Award	Novel	2007	The Privilege of the Sword	Nominated
Skylark Award	–	2024	–	Won
World Fantasy Award	Novel	1991	Thomas the Rhymer	Won
World Fantasy Award	Novel	2007	The Privilege of the Sword	Nominated
World Fantasy Award	Novella	1998	The Fall of the Kings	Nominated
World Fantasy Award	Short Fiction	1999	"The Death of the Duke"	Nominated

== Published works ==
Kushner has published four edited volumes, four novels, two poems, and more than forty short stories, beginning with Basilisk in 1980, an anthology for which she served as editor. Her first novel, 1987's Swordspoint, is considered a central text in the fantasy of manners subgenre and was inducted into the Gaylactic Spectrum Awards Hall of Fame in 2000.
