= Delia Sherman =

American writer (born 1951)

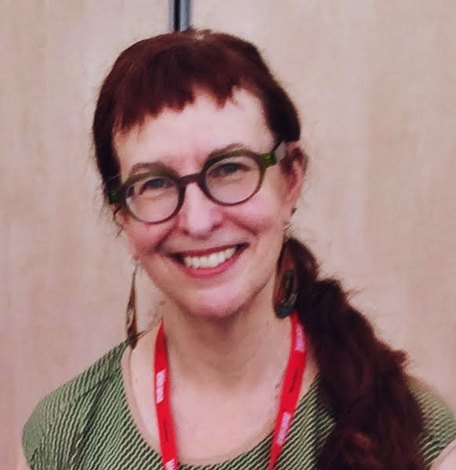
- Delia Sherman, 2013
- Born: Cordelia Caroline Sherman; 1951 (age 74–75); Tokyo, Japan
- Education: Vassar College (AB); Brown University (MA, PhD)
- Spouse: Ellen Kushner
- Writing career
- Genre: Speculative fiction
- Website: web.archive.org/web/20170128013349/http://www.sff.net/people/kushnersherman/sherman/

Cordelia Caroline Sherman (born 1951, Tokyo, Japan), known professionally as Delia Sherman, is an American fantasy writer and editor. Her novel The Porcelain Dove won the Mythopoeic Fantasy Award.

== Background ==
Sherman attended The Chapin School in New York. She received her A.B. at Vassar College in 1972, her Masters of Arts from Brown University in 1975, and her Ph.D. from Brown University in 1981. She has worked as a lecturer at Boston University from 1978 to 1987 and again from 1989 to 1992; and a reviewer with the Women's Review of Books, the New York Review of Science Fiction, and Science Fiction and Fantasy Review Annual between 1988 and 1989. From 1996 to 2004 she was a consulting editor at Tor Books and since 1993 she has been a full-time writer, lecturer and teacher.

She has taught at Hollins College Children's Literature Program; and instructed at the Clarion Science Fiction Writer's Workshop, the WisCon Writing Workshop, the Odyssey Fantasy Writing Workshop and the Alpha Teen Writing Workshop. She was a guest author at the Virginia Highlands Festival Creative Writing Days in 2001.

== Novels ==
Her three novels for adults are all from the subgenre Fantasy of Manners:

- Through a Brazen Mirror (1988)
- The Porcelain Dove (1993)
- The Fall of the Kings (2002) (with Ellen Kushner)

Changeling (2006) and its sequel The Magic Mirror of the Mermaid Queen (2009) were fantasy adventures written for younger readers. They are set in "New York Between," a world she has explored in various short stories.

The Freedom Maze (2011), set in Louisiana in 1960 and 1860, is a young adult fantasy novel that uses the device of time-travel to explore the themes of slavery, courage, womanhood, and family ties. The novel won the 2012 Prometheus Award and the Andre Norton Award.

Her novel The Evil Wizard Smallbone (2016) was nominated for the Andre Norton Award.

== Other work ==
Sherman is co-editor (with Ellen Kushner and Donald G. Keller) of the fantasy anthology The Horns of Elfland, and (with Terri Windling) of The Essential Bordertown.

With Kushner and others, she is actively involved in the Interstitial art movement. She was a founding member of (and the first president of) the Interstitial Arts Foundation. She is also a member of the Endicott Studio. Together with Kushner, she was an instructor at the Clarion Workshop 2007 in San Diego.

== Personal life ==
She lives in New York City with her wife and sometime collaborator, Ellen Kushner. They were married in 1996.

== Bibliography ==
=== Novels ===
- Through a Brazen Mirror (Ace, 1988; Circlet Press, 1989)
- The Porcelain Dove (Dutton, 1993; Plume, 1994)
- The Fall of the Kings (Bantam Books, 2002) (with Ellen Kushner)
- Changeling (Viking/Penguin, 2006)
- The Magic Mirror of the Mermaid Queen (Viking/Penguin, 2009)
- The Freedom Maze (Big Mouth House, 2011; Candlewick Press, 2014; Editions Hélium, 2014; Constable & Robinson, 2015) – won the Prometheus Award for libertarian science fiction and the Andre Norton Award
- The Evil Wizard Smallbone (Candlewick Press, 2016) - nominated for Andre Norton Award

=== Collections ===
- Young Woman in a Garden and Other Stories (Small Beer Press, 2015)

=== Edited ===
- The Horns of Elfland (Roc, 1997) (with Ellen Kushner and Don Keller)
- Sherman, Delia; Windling, Terri, eds. (1998). The Essential Bordertown : A Traveller's Guide to the Edge of Faerie.
- Interfictions (IAF Press, 2007) (with Theodora Goss)
- Sherman, Delia; Barzak, Christopher, eds. (2009). Interfictions 2 : An Anthology of Interstitial Fiction. Small Beer Press.
- Interfictions Zero (interstitialarts.org, 2010–12) (with Helen Pilinovsky)
- Interfictions Online: A Magazine of Interstitial Art (Executive Editor, 2013-)

== Awards and nominations ==
- Nominee, Andre Norton Award, 2017
- Andre Norton Award, 2012
- Prometheus Award, 2012
- Nominee, World Fantasy Award, 1999, 2001, 2006
- Mythopoeic Awards for Fantasy Fiction, 1994, 2012
- Finalist, John W. Campbell Award for Best New Writer of 1989
