= Chicks in Chainmail =

1995 anthology of fantasy stories edited by Esther Friesner

- First edition
- Editor: Esther Friesner
- Cover artist: Larry Elmore
- Language: English
- Series: Chicks in Chainmail
- Genre: Fantasy
- Publisher: Baen Books
- Publication date: 1995
- Publication place: United States
- Media type: Print (paperback)
- Pages: 341 pp.
- ISBN: 0-671-87682-1
- OCLC: 33039808
- LC Class: CPB Box no. 1849 vol. 15
- Followed by: Did You Say Chicks?!

Chicks in Chainmail is an anthology of fantasy stories, edited by Esther Friesner, with a cover by Larry Elmore. It consists of works featuring female protagonists mostly written by female authors. It was first published in paperback by Baen Books in September 1995, with a hardcover edition following from Baen in conjunction with the Science Fiction Book Club in January 1996. It was the first of a number of similarly themed anthologies edited by Friesner.

The book collects 20 short stories by various fantasy authors, with an introduction by Friesner.

== Contents ==
- "Introduction" (Esther Friesner)
- "Lady of Steel" (Roger Zelazny)
- "And Ladies of the Club" (Elizabeth Moon)
- "Exchange Program" (Susan Shwartz)
- "Goddess for a Day" (Harry Turtledove)
- "Armor-Ella" (Holly Lisle)
- "Career Day" (Margaret Ball)
- "Armor/Amore" (David Vierling)
- "The Stone of War and the Nightingale's Egg" (Elizabeth Ann Scarborough)
- "The Growling" (Jody Lynn Nye)
- "The New Britomart" (Eluki bes Shahar)
- "On the Road of Silver" (Mark Bourne)
- "Bra Melting" (Janni Lee Simner)
- "The Old Grind" (Laura Frankos)
- "The Way to a Man's Heart" (Esther Friesner)
- "Whoops!" (Nancy Springer)
- "The Guardswoman" (Lawrence Watt-Evans)
- "Teacher's Pet" (Josepha Sherman)
- "Were-Wench" (Jan Stirling)
- "Blood Calls to Blood" (Elisabeth Waters)
- "Maureen Birnbaum in the MUD" (George Alec Effinger)

== Related works ==
The “Chicks in Chainmail” franchise includes a novel—Mathemagics: A Chicks in Chainmail Novel (1996) by Margaret Ball (writer)—and the ongoing series of “Chicks” anthologies edited by Friesner:

1. Chicks in Chainmail (1995)
2. Did You Say Chicks?! (1998)
3. Chicks 'n Chained Males (1999)
4. The Chick Is in the Mail (2000)
5. Turn the Other Chick (2004)
6. Chicks and Balances (2015)

Chicks Ahoy! (2010) omnibus of first three volumes

Esther Friesner also edited a "Suburban Fantasy" anthology series, similarly focused on female protagonists:

1. Witch Way to the Mall (June 2009) ISBN 1-4391-3274-7
2. Strip Mauled (October 2009) ISBN 1-4391-3320-4
3. Fangs for the Mammaries (2010) ISBN 1-4391-3392-1
