= Chicks and Balances =

2015 fantasy story anthology

- Cover of the first edition
- Author: Edited by Esther Friesner and John Helfers
- Cover artist: Tom Wood
- Language: English
- Series: Chicks in Chainmail
- Genre: Fantasy
- Publisher: Baen Books
- Publication date: 2015
- Publication place: United States
- Media type: Print (paperback)
- Pages: 336 pp.
- ISBN: 978-1-4767-8063-4
- OCLC: 894936615
- Dewey Decimal: 813.08766083522 23
- LC Class: PS648.F3 C48 2015
- Preceded by: Turn the Other Chick

Chicks and Balances is an anthology of fantasy stories, edited by Esther Friesner and John Helfers, with a cover by Tom Wood. It consists of works featuring female protagonists by (mostly) female authors. It was first published in trade paperback and e-book form by Baen Books in July 2015. It was the sixth of a series of similarly themed anthologies, the first five of which were edited by Friesner alone.

== Summary ==
The book collects 22 short stories and novelettes by various fantasy authors, with an introduction and a section of notes about the authors by Friesner.

== Contents ==
- "Introduction" (Esther Friesner)
- "A Chick Off the Old Block" (Jody Lynn Nye)
- "The Girls from the Hood" (Jim C. Hines)
- "Smackdown at Walmart" (Elizabeth A. Vaughan)
- "The Mammyth" (Harry Turtledove)
- "Give a Girl a Sword" (Kerrie L. Hughes)
- "Bite Me" (Steven Harper Piziks)
- "Dark Pixii" (Wen Spencer)
- "A Warrior Looks at 40" (Julie S. Mandala)
- "Roll Model" (Esther Friesner)
- "Second Hand Hero" (Jean Rabe)
- "Burying Treasure" (Alex Shvartsman)
- "Calling the Mom Squad" (Sarah A. Hoyt)
- "Rabid Weasels" (Robin Wayne Bailey)
- "A Girl's Home Is Her Rent-Controlled Castle" (Laura Resnick)
- ". . . And Your Enemies Closer" (Lee Martindale)
- "Knot and the Dragon" (P. C. Hodgell)
- "The Rules of the Game: A Poker Boy Story" (Dean Wesley Smith)
- "Beginner's Luck" (Linda L. Donahue)
- "One Touch of Hippolyta" (Laura Frankos)
- "Saving Private Slime" (Louisa Swann)
- "Unearthing the Undying Armor" (Elizabeth Ann Scarborough)
- "Fashion and the Snarkmeisters" (Kristine Kathryn Rusch)
- "About the Authors" (Esther Friesner)
