= Turn the Other Chick =

- Cover of the first edition.
- Author: Edited by Esther Friesner
- Cover artist: Mitch Foust
- Language: English
- Series: Chicks in Chainmail
- Genre: Fantasy
- Publisher: Baen Books
- Publication date: 2004
- Publication place: United States
- Media type: Print (Hardcover)
- Pages: 295 pp.
- ISBN: 0-7434-8857-1
- OCLC: 55800911
- Dewey Decimal: 813/.0876608358 22
- LC Class: PS648.W6 T87 2004
- Preceded by: The Chick Is in the Mail
- Followed by: Chicks and Balances

Turn the Other Chick is an anthology of fantasy stories, edited by Esther Friesner, with a cover by Mitch Foust. It consists of works featuring female protagonists by (mostly) female authors. It was first published in hardcover by Baen Books in November 2004; a paperback edition followed in March 2006. It was the fifth of a series of similarly themed anthologies edited by Friesner. (The first three books were collected as Chicks Ahoy in 2010).

The book collects 22 short stories and novelettes by various fantasy authors, with an introduction and a section of notes about the authors by Friesner.

== Contents ==
- "Introduction" (Esther Friesner), reprinted on-line here.
- "Mightier Than the Sword" (John G. Hemry), reprinted on-line here.
- "A Late Symmer Night's Battle" (Laura Frankos), reprinted on-line here.
- "Psyched Up" (Michael D. Turner), reprinted on-line here.
- "Branded" (Jan Stirling), reprinted on-line here.
- "The Girl's Guide to Defeating the Dark Lord" (Cassandra Claire), reprinted on-line here.
- "She Stuffs to Conquer" (Yvonne Coats), reprinted on-line here.
- "The Gypsy Queen" (Catherine H. Shaffer)
- "Over the Hill" (Jim C. Hines)
- "A Sword Called Rhonda" (D. S. Moen)
- "Giants in the Earth" (Esther Friesner)
- "Rituals for a New God" (Wen Spencer)
- "I Look Good" (Selina Rosen)
- "Combat Shopping" (Lee Martindale)
- "Battle Ready" (J. Ardian Lee)
- "A Woman's Armor" (Lesley McBain)
- "Hallah Iron-Thighs and the Hall of the Puppet King" (K. D. Wentworth)
- "Princess Injera Versus the Spanakopita of Doom" (Robin Wayne Bailey)
- "Brunhilde's Bra" (Laura J. Underwood)
- "Smoke and Mirrors" (Steven Piziks)
- "The Truth About the Gotterdammerung" (Eric Flint)
- "Defender of the Small" (Jody Lynn Nye)
- "Of Mice and Chicks" (Harry Turtledove)
- "About the Authors" (Esther Friesner)
