= Maureen Birnbaum, Barbarian Swordsperson =

1993 speculative fiction anthology by George Alec Effinger

- First edition (Swan Press, 1993)
- Author: George Alec Effinger
- Illustrator: Peggy Ranson (1993); Ken Kelly (1994)
- Cover artist: Peggy Ranson (1993); Ken Kelly (1994)
- Publisher: Swan Press (1993); SFBC (1994)
- Publication date: June 1993; August 1994
- Media type: trade paper (1993); hardcover (1994)
- ISBN: 1-883722-01-2 (1993); 1-56865-101-5 (1994)

Maureen Birnbaum, Barbarian Swordsperson is a 1993 story collection by American writer George Alec Effinger, collecting all of his stories (up to 1993) about Maureen "Muffy" Birnbaum, a Jewish-American princess who is magically teleported to various fantasy and science fiction universes, and later recounts the tales to her best friend, "Bitsy" Spiegelman. Originally written on his own initiative, the character proved popular enough for Effinger to gain several requests from authors to have versions of their work visited by Muffy.

In addition to satirizing and spoofing the various themes, the stories had a feminist undertone, as Maureen dealt with the often sexist reactions of the inhabitants of the worlds she met, struggled to find the Martian prince she had fallen in love with, and contrasted her adventures with the life of Bitsy, a housewife with an increasingly unhappy marriage.

The collection had two editions:

- Swan Press trade paper (June 1993, ISBN 1-883722-01-2) cover and interior illustrations by Peggy Ranson.
- Guild America/SFBC hardcover (Aug. 1994, ISBN 1-56865-101-5) cover and interior illustrations by Ken Kelly.

The hardcover reused the trade paper’s copyright page (i.e. date and illustration credit). The hardcover's jacket has the correct credit, and the correct date was advertised in Locus magazine.

== Contents ==
Details of included stories
Title	Story parodied	Original publication	Notes
"A Few Words from Muffy Birnbaum's Most Passionate Admirer"	—	this anthology	Introduction by Mike Resnick
"Maureen Birnbaum, Barbarian Swordsperson"	Barsoom	Fantasy & Science Fiction, January 1982	
"Maureen Birnbaum at the Earth's Core"	Pellucidar	Fantasy & Science Fiction, February 1986	
"Maureen Birnbaum on the Art of War"	Horseclans	Friends of the Horseclans (1987)	ISBN 0-451-14789-8
"Maureen Birnbaum After Dark"	"Nightfall"	Foundation's Friends (1989)	ISBN 0-312-93174-3
"Maureen Birnbaum Goes Shopynge"	Robin Hood	The Fantastic Adventures of Robin Hood (1991)	ISBN 0-451-17053-9
"Maureen Birnbaum and the Saint Graal"	Grail legend	written for Grails: Visitations of the Night (1994)	ISBN 0-451-45304-2
"Maureen Birnbaum and the Looming Awfulness"	Cthulhu Mythos	this anthology	
"Maureen Birnbaum's Lunar Adventure"	feghoot	science fiction convention program (1986)	Revised for this anthology

== Other stories ==
- "Maureen Birnbaum on a Hot Tin Roof" (1994)

South from Midnight (1994), anthology edited by Richard Gilliam, Martin H. Greenberg, & Thomas R. Hanlon
Fantasy & Science Fiction (August 1996), edited by Kristine Kathryn Rusch

- "Maureen Birnbaum in the MUD" (1995)

Chicks in Chainmail (1995), anthology edited by Esther Friesner
Chicks Ahoy (2010), anthology edited by Esther Friesner

- "Maureen Birnbaum Pokes an Eye Out" (1996)

Don't Forget Your Spacesuit, Dear (1996), anthology edited by Jody Lynn Nye
