= Counting Up, Counting Down =

2002 short story collection by Harry Turtledove

- First edition
- Author: Harry Turtledove
- Cover artist: Istvan Orosz
- Language: English
- Genre: Alternate history, Science fiction, Fantasy
- Published: January 2002
- Publisher: Del Rey Books
- Publication place: United States
- Media type: Print (Paperback & Leatherbound)

Counting Up, Counting Down is a collection of short stories by Harry Turtledove, most of which were first published in various fiction magazines in the 1990s. It is named after two of the stories appearing in the book, one called "Forty, Counting Down" and the other named "Twenty-One, Counting Up", which are united by the character of Justin Kloster. The story genres represented include alternate history, time travel, fantasy, straight historical fiction, and more. Two stories, "The Decoy Duck" and "The Seventh Chapter," are set in the Videssos Universe, with the former story being set before any of the other stories and books in that universe. The book was originally published by Del Rey as a trade paperback in January 2002. In the same month, it was brought out as a leatherbound limited edition by Easton Press.

== Short stories ==
=== "Forty, Counting Down" ===
A 40-year-old computer genius named Justin Kloster invents a time machine based on string theory and virtual reality. Using this device, he travels back in time to visit himself when he was 21. It was at this age that he began dating his future wife, who would later divorce him. As Justin has never recuperated from his loss, he decides that this time machine is his chance to redo his relationship with her with more success. As such, he convinces his younger self to lie low while his older self courts his girlfriend. Unfortunately for 40-year-old Justin, he is even less successful with his girlfriend than his younger counterpart, and their relationship ends much sooner than in the original timeline. When Justin returns to his original time, leaving a large amount of money behind, he discovers that he has successfully founded his own string-theory company, and is happily married to another woman and has two sons. He attributes this to his original relationship not having become as serious, as well as inspiring his younger self and providing him with seed-money to start his own business.

=== "Must and Shall" ===
On July 12, 1864, while the United States is being torn apart by the Great Rebellion, President Abraham Lincoln is killed by a sharpshooter at Fort Stevens while inspecting the ramparts.

Meanwhile, Vice President Hannibal Hamlin, who had retired to Bangor, Maine after being passed over for renomination as Vice President in favor of Andrew Johnson, receives an emergency telegram to summoned him out of Bangor to Washington, D.C. to assume the Presidency. Nine days later on July 21, Hamlin becomes the 17th President and at his inaugural speech, he promises severe retribution on the Confederate States.

When the Union puts down the Rebellion in 1865, the South is placed under heavy federal military occupation. Many Confederate leaders such as Jefferson Davis, Robert E. Lee, and Joseph E. Johnston are condemned for high treason and executed by hanging.

77 years later, the South is still under Union military occupation. However, on August 11, 1942, a Nazi transport is caught smuggling weapons into New Orleans, Louisiana to help the Southerners start a Neo-Confederate uprising in order to keep the US out of the European Theater.

In his Nebula Awards acceptance letter for this story, Turtledove describes it as an allegory of a "Northern Ireland in North America".

The title comes from a quote attributed to antebellum President Andrew Jackson, "The Union must and shall be preserved," referenced in the story.

The story would later be reprinted in Turtledove's short-story collection The Best of Harry Turtledove in 2021.

=== "Ready for the Fatherland" ===
On February 19, 1943, Wehrmacht Field Marshal Erich von Manstein assassinates Adolf Hitler in response to an insult. Manstein and his co-conspirators then take over the German government and make a separate peace with the Soviet Union. Redeploying all forces to the Western and Southern Fronts, Germany is able to keep the Allied forces from gaining a toe-hold in Italy and France. With that, World War II ends in a stalemate. The Cold War becomes a three-way conflict, with the United States and the United Kingdom jostling against Nazi Germany and the Soviet Union.

In 1979, two British SIS agents named George Smith and Peter Drinkwater travel to Fascist-ruled Croatia to meet with a Serb partisan, seeking British arms. In truth, the Brits are there to entrap the man, and arrange for his capture and arrest by the Croatian Ustase authorities, in exchange for the UK being allowed access to German oil wells in the North Sea.

Most of the 1979 scenes take place in Rijeka. Turtledove explains that his wife's visit to that city inspired him to set a story there.

=== "The Phantom Tolbukhin" ===
The point of divergence is that Joseph Stalin's purges of his own military (1936–1938) were far more costly than in reality. In this version, Georgy Zhukov and Ivan Koniev were also killed. In addition, Operation Barbarossa began in May 1941, rather than June as in real history, giving Nazi Germany more time to fully exploit the surprise attack on the disorganized Red Army.

By 1947, the Soviet Union has largely collapsed. Leningrad and Moscow have both fallen to the Germans, but Stalin is believed to be still alive. Soviet partisans follow their leader Fedor Tolbukhin, called "The Phantom," on a guerrilla raid. The title is a pun on the fantasy story The Phantom Tollbooth.

Tolbukhin, Nikita Khrushchev, and other surviving Soviet commanders raid occupied Zaporozhye in Ukraine, stealing German munitions, destroying the remainder, and killing several German troops. Throughout the story, Tolbukhin finds himself sentimental for the prewar days, despite the terror of living under Stalin.

This story could very well take place in the same timeline as Turtledove's In the Presence of Mine Enemies, but the author has never said that it is the case. The story had previously been published in Harry Turtledove edited anthology Alternate Generals in 1998.

=== "Deconstruction Gang" ===
A young man who receives a doctorate of philosophy in English quickly learns after graduation how limited his job opportunities are. When he finds himself unable to secure a position at a university or even as a technical writer, the young doctor rather arbitrarily decides to apply for a job with a "road deconstruction gang." He soon learns that his degree makes him uniquely talented for such work, even if it is not the sort of "studious" position that he wanted.

After answering the foreman's question about Paul de Man intelligently, the young man is hired, starting the next day. He goes home, notifies his fiancée, who is pleased, and goes to bed early. On his first day, he is assigned to Gang 4 and sent to work on Durant Street. He soon proves himself quite capable of applying deconstruction principles to road work. By the end of the day, the young doctor is truly part of the gang and has accomplished a great deal of work on Durant Street.

The story is told in a second-person narrative. Thus, the identity of the young deconstructionist is not revealed.

=== "The Green Buffalo" ===
The story is narrated by Joe, a general store keeper in Lusk, Wyoming in 1890. He is hired by paleontologist John Bell Hatcher as part of a hunting party for his expedition. While on the trail, the hunters wander through a ripple in time, and are briefly transported into Wyoming's Cretaceous Period. After backtracking, they return to 1890, and track a herd of buffalo. They discover a Torosaurus among the herd. Joe and his fellow hunters do not realize what the creature is and assume that it is some sort of diseased green buffalo. The hunters chase and kill the dinosaur, butcher it, and bring the meat back to Hatcher at the dig site. When Hatcher offers to show Joe a newspaper cartoon featuring several dinosaurs, including Torosaurus, Joe refuses and so neither man learns that their dinner is not a diseased buffalo but a dinosaur.

=== "The Maltese Elephant" ===
This story is Turtledove's pastiche of "The Maltese Falcon" by Dashiell Hammett. It follows the same basic plot of Hammett's novel, only it is in short story form and the MacGuffin is a living, breathing elephant rather than a falcon statue.

=== "Vermin" ===
On a distant planet in the far future, there are two human settlements. One comprises a particularly-repressive sect of fundamentalist Christian luddites, who forbid most discussions and practices of sex; the other comprises free-thinking enlightened scientists. There is also a sentient semi-humanoid native life form with unusual reproductive procedures and a louse-like parasite, which infests all alike. Both human groups seek to interfere with the parasite's ecological function, with ironic results.

=== "Ils ne passeront pas" ===
During the Battle of Verdun in 1916, two French soldiers witness the seven trumpets of the Book of Revelation descending onto the battlefield. Assuming that they are newfangled German weapons and that their own senses are addled by poison gas, they blast away the supernatural creatures with nary a second thought.

=== "In This Season" ===
Shortly into World War II, three Jewish families (the Friedman, Geller and Korczak Families) in Puck, Poland are warned by a golem to flee by boat from the invading Germans to reach neutral Sweden during Chanukah week, 1939. In keeping with the event commemorated by the week, the fuel oil in the boat, which should have lasted for one day and left them becalmed at sea, miraculously lasts for eight days so they reach their destination.

Turtledove explains that the story was written as the sole Chanukah entry in a book of Christmas stories.

=== "Honeymouth" ===
In this spoof of Arthurian legend and fairy tales, a knight who is a wanton ladies' man is able to ride a unicorn, a beast that supposedly lets only virgins touch it. A seneschal investigates to learn how that paradox can be.

=== Miss Manner's Guide to Greek Missology #1: Andromeda and Perseus ===
Monty Python-style retelling of the Greek myth of Perseus, Andromeda, and the Gorgons, filled with humorous anachronisms.

=== "Goddess for a Day" ===
Retelling of an anecdote from Book I of Herodotus's Histories from the viewpoint of the young woman who played the role of Athena in the triumphal parade of the Athenian tyrant Peisistratos in the 6th century BC. Along the way, she encounters mythical creatures.

=== "After the Last Elf is Dead" ===
A The Lord of the Rings homage examines what a Middle-Earth type of universe would be like if Evil triumphed over Good.

=== "The Decoy Duck" ===
This is the prequel to the Videssos cycle, set before the other stories in that series. Set in fictitious countries, a sincere, kindhearted missionary returns from a monotheist Byzantine Empire analogue where he grew up in slavery, to his native, Viking-like polytheist culture, with a sincere intention to save souls. However the people there regard him as a spy from an expansionist empire bent on conquest.

Turtledove explains that the story is set 900 years before The Misplaced Legion.

=== "The Seventh Chapter" ===
Another story set in the Videssos universe. A priest investigates a small town where the clerics have found a loophole in the celibacy requirement.

=== "Twenty-One, Counting Up" ===
This story deals with the same events and characters as "Forty, Counting Down" from the viewpoint of the younger Justin. Turtledove refuses to say which Justin story he wrote first, and insists that only he and his wife Laura Frankos know.
