= Did You Say Chicks?! =

Book by Esther Friesner

- Cover of first edition.
- Author: Edited by Esther Friesner
- Cover artist: Larry Elmore
- Language: English
- Series: Chicks in Chainmail
- Genre: Fantasy
- Publisher: Baen Books
- Publication date: 1998
- Publication place: United States
- Media type: Print (Paperback)
- Pages: 309 pp.
- ISBN: 0-671-87867-0
- OCLC: 38276235
- Preceded by: Chicks in Chainmail
- Followed by: Chicks 'n Chained Males

Did You Say Chicks?! is an anthology of fantasy stories, edited by Esther Friesner, with a cover by Larry Elmore. It consists of works featuring female protagonists by (mostly) female authors. It was first published in paperback by Baen Books in February 1998. It was the second of a number of similarly themed anthologies edited by Friesner.

The book collects 19 short stories and novelettes by various fantasy authors, with an introduction by Friesner and a section of notes about the authors.

== Contents ==
- "Introduction" (Esther Friesner)
- "No Pain, No Gain" (Elizabeth Moon)
- "Slue-Foot Sue and the Witch in the Woods" (Laura Frankos)
- "A Young Swordswoman's Garden Primer" (Sarah Zettel)
- "The Old Fire" (Jody Lynn Nye)
- "Like No Business I Know" (Mark Bourne)
- "A Bone to Pick" (Marina Frants and Keith R. A. DeCandido)
- "The Attack of the Avenging Virgins" (Elizabeth Ann Scarborough)
- "Oh, Sweet Goodnight!" (Christina Briley and Walter Vance Awsten)
- "A Bitch in Time" (Doranna Durgin)
- "Don't You Want to Be Beautiful?" (Laura Anne Gilman)
- "A Night with the Girls" (Barbara Hambly)
- "A Quiet Knight's Reading" (Steven Piziks)
- "Armor Propre" (Jan Stirling and S. M. Stirling)
- "A Big Hand for the Little Lady" (Esther Friesner)
- "Blade Runner" (K. D. Wentworth)
- "Keeping Up Appearances" (Lawrence Watt-Evans)
- "La Différence" (Harry Turtledove)
- "Tales from the Slushpile" (Margaret Ball)
- "Yes, We Did Say Chicks!" (Adam-Troy Castro)
- "About the Authors" (uncredited)
