= Chicks 'n Chained Males =

1999 fantasy story anthology

- Cover of first edition.
- Author: Edited by Esther Friesner, Martin H. Greenberg
- Cover artist: Larry Elmore
- Language: English
- Series: Chicks in Chainmail
- Genre: Fantasy
- Publisher: Baen Books
- Publication date: May 1999
- Publication place: United States
- Media type: Print (Paperback)
- Pages: 313 pp.
- ISBN: 0-671-57814-6
- OCLC: 41303377
- Preceded by: Did You Say Chicks?!
- Followed by: The Chick is in the Mail

Chicks 'n Chained Males is an anthology of fantasy stories, edited by Esther Friesner with the assistance of Martin H. Greenberg, with a cover by Larry Elmore. It consists of works featuring female protagonists by (mostly) female authors. It was first published in paperback by Baen Books in May 1999. It was the third of a number of similarly themed anthologies edited by Friesner.

The book collects 18 short stories by various fantasy authors, with an introduction by Friesner.

As per the volume's title, most of the stories involve heroic women having to rescue men from captivity, reversing the damsel in distress trope.

== Contents ==
- "Introduction" (Esther Friesner)
- "Myth Manners' Guide to Greek Missology #1: Andromeda and Perseus" (Harry Turtledove)
- "Chain, Link, Fence" (Steven Piziks)
- "Fool's Gold" (Elizabeth Moon)
- "In for a Pound" (Lawrence Watt-Evans)
- "Death Becomes Him" (Marina Frants) - sequel to "A Bone to Pick" from the previous volume
- "Straight Arrow" (Susan Shwartz)
- "Bad Heir Day" (Rosemary Edghill)
- "Why Do You Think They Call It Middle Earth?" (Susan Casper)
- "Leg Irons, the Bitch, and the Wardrobe" (Laura Frankos)
- "Shiftless" (Josepha Sherman)
- "May/December at the Mall" (Brian D. Akers)
- "Yo, Baby!" (Jan Stirling)
- "Don't Break the Chain!" (Jody Lynn Nye)
- "Cross CHILDREN Walk" (Esther Friesner)
- "...But Comedy is Hard" (Kate Daniel)
- "Baubles, Bangles and Beads" (Kevin Andrew Murphy)
- "Hallah Iron-Thighs and the Five Unseemly Sorrows" (K. D. Wentworth)
- "Miss Underwood and the Mermaid" (Sarah Zettel)
