= GURPS Bili the Axe – Up Harzburk! =

Role-playing game

GURPS Bili the Axe - Up Harzburk!
- Cover by Ken Kelly
- Designers: Steve Jackson; W.G. Armintrout
- Publishers: Steve Jackson Games
- Publication: 1988; 38 years ago
- Genres: Apocalyptic and post-apocalyptic science fiction
- Systems: GURPS

GURPS Bili the Axe – Up Harzburk! is a role-playing campaign of solo adventures for the GURPS role-playing game system, set in Robert Adams's Horseclans universe.

== Contents ==
Bili the Axe – Up Harzburk! is a solo adventure scenario intended for GURPS Horseclans, in which the player character is the warrior known as Bili the Axe, who spends four years adventuring in the Middle Kingdom. The book presents new rules for combat, including combat rules involving animals.

== Publication history ==
Bili the Axe: Up the Harzburk! was written by W.G. Armintrout, with a cover by Ken Kelly, and was published by Steve Jackson Games in 1988 as an 80-page book. It was edited by David Ladyman and Ravi Rai.

Bili the Axe was an adventure for GURPS Horseclans and one of several adventures for the GURPS line, the majority of them being solo adventures like the MicroQuests previously published for The Fantasy Trip.

Steve Jackson Games recalled Bili the Axe because of an error that renders the scenario unplayable as written. The book is notorious for having been printed with a serious error in the numbering of the paragraphs, making it virtually impossible to play the adventure as designed. When Steve Jackson Games discovered the error, it recalled and destroyed all available copies. The adventure has never been republished, and the few copies that were bought in the brief period it was available have become rare collector's items.

== See also ==
- List of GURPS publications
