= GURPS Horseclans =

Post-apocalyptic role-playing game

Roleplaying in Robert Adam's Barbarian Future
- Cover by Ken Kelly
- Designers: Steve Jackson; Jerry Epperson
- Illustrators: Ken Kelly; C. Bradford Gorby
- Publishers: Steve Jackson Games
- Publication: 1987; 39 years ago
- Genres: Post-apocalypse
- Systems: GURPS

GURPS Horseclans, subtitled "Roleplaying in Robert Adam's Barbarian Future", is a post-apocalyptic role-playing game published by Steve Jackson Games (SJG) in 1987 that is based on the Horseclans science fiction series of novels by Robert Adams. It was one of the first worldbooks that was published for the GURPS game system.

== Contents ==
Robert Adams' Horseclan novels describe a North America that had been thrown back to a medieval level by a nuclear war. GURPS Horseclans is a GURPS supplement describing the milieu of the Horseclans, a world of barbarian nomads, where some remnants of "magical" higher technology still exist.

A complete chronology of the world includes references to where each event happened in the Horesclan novels. Several ages are singled out with suggestions for "Campaign Periods." Critic Laura Antoniou called this "a godsend for those gamemasters who want to feature a specific personality as a non-player character or cross over and/or include a favorite scene or battle."

The land of Mehrikah is presented in detail, including insights into the lands and histories that were not included in the novels due to length, as well as maps that show the locations of famous battles and Clan boundaries

An optional rule allows one player to be responsible for an entire clan, making it possible to continue playing even after a player character has died.

Other content includes a list of all the languages mentioned in the novels and suggestions on how they can e used in play; psionics; gunpowder; swords; individual and mass combat rules; optional variant rules; and suggestions on what type of campaign to present, and rules for mass combat.

== Publication history ==
Robert Adams started to write the Horseclans series in 1975; by 1987, he had written seventeen books in the series. That year, SJG acquired a license to adapt his setting to GURPS — it was one of the earliest licensed properties produced by SJG.. The result was GURPS Horseclans, a 96-page book written by Steve Jackson and Jerry Epperson, with cover art by Ken Kelly, and interior art by C. Bradford Gorby.

The following year, SJG published a solo adventure for this setting, GURPS Bili the Axe – Up Harzburk!.

== Reception ==
In Issue 8 of Gateways, Laura Antoniou commented "It is rare that a game world has this much detail and source material, and is it equally rare for a published series of novels to have such a well-produced game available for fans. This is a combination that is compelling. Collectors, fans and gamers should enjoy GURPS Horseclans, and look forward to similar products from the busy folks at Steve Jackson Games."

== See also ==
- List of GURPS publications
