= Magic in Ithkar 2 =

1985 anthology edited by Andre Norton and Robert Adams

- Cover art from the first edition
- Author: Andre Norton and Robert Adams (editors)
- Cover artist: Walter Velez
- Language: English
- Series: Magic in Ithkar
- Genre: Fantasy short stories
- Publisher: Tor Books
- Publication date: 1985
- Publication place: United States
- Media type: Print (paperback)
- Pages: 306
- ISBN: 0-8125-4745-4
- OCLC: 13097340
- LC Class: PS648.F3 M282 1985
- Preceded by: Magic in Ithkar
- Followed by: Magic in Ithkar 3

Magic in Ithkar 2 is a shared world anthology of fantasy stories edited by Andre Norton and Robert Adams. It was first published as a trade paperback by Tor Books in December 1985 and later reprinted as a standard paperback in October 1988.

== Summary ==
The book collects fourteen original short stories by various fantasy authors which share the setting of an annual fair in the city of Ithkar, together with an introduction by Adams and notes on the authors by Norton.

== Setting ==
As described in the introduction by co-editor Robert Adams (identical to that in the previous volume), the world of which Ithkar is a part has suffered from some past holocaust which wiped out an earlier, higher civilization. Subsequently, the area which became Ithkar became a base for the explorations of three godlike visitors, who came to be worshiped as actual deities after their departure. A temple and priesthood dedicated to them developed over succeeding generations, which held a yearly fair on the anniversary of the visitors' first arrival. The city of Ithkar grew up about the temple on the strength of the commerce the fair attracted.

The historical background provided appears science fictional in nature; the war that destroyed the previous culture is related in terms which suggest a nuclear war, complete with radiation-derived mutations of life-forms in the vicinities of the nuclear strikes, while the story of the visitors resembles an expedition of interstellar explorers. Present-day Ithkar is, however, a fantasy setting, in which wizards and sorcerers are rife, and magic works.

== Contents ==
- "Prologue" (Robert Adams)
- "Flux of Fortune" (Mildred Downey Broxon)
- "Geydelle's Protective" (Lin Carter)
- "If There Be Magic" (Marylois Dunn)
- "Babes on Bawd Way" (George Alec Effinger)
- "Sardofa's Horseshoes" (Gregory Frost)
- "The Ruby Wand of Asrazel" (Joseph Green)
- "Bird of Paradise" (Linda Haldeman)
- "Flaming-Arrow" (R. A. Lafferty)
- "The Shaman Flute" (Shariann Lewitt)
- "Shadow Quest" (Brad Linaweaver)
- "Kissmeowt and the Healing Friar" (A. R. Major)
- "The Cards of Eldrianza" (Mary H. Schaub)
- "The Marbled Horn" (Lynn Ward)
- "Biographical Notes" (Andre Norton)

== Reception ==
The book was reviewed by Don D'Ammassa in Science Fiction Chronicle no. 83, August 1986.
