= Space Opera (1996 anthology) =

- Editor: Anne McCaffrey; Elizabeth Scarborough
- Cover artist: Jim Burns
- Language: English
- Genre: Science fiction
- Publisher: DAW Books
- Publication date: 1996
- Publication place: United States
- Media type: Print (paperback)
- Pages: 400
- ISBN: 978-0-88677-714-2

Space Opera is a 1996 anthology of science fiction short stories and novelettes edited by Anne McCaffrey and Elizabeth Scarborough.

== Contents ==
- Introduction (Space Opera) • essay by Anne McCaffrey and Elizabeth Ann Scarborough
- Bird in the Hand • short story by Anne McCaffrey
- Calling Them Home • short story by Jody Lynn Nye
- Saskia • novelette by Charles de Lint
- Songchild • short story by Robin Wayne Bailey
- A Song of Strange Revenge • short story by Josepha Sherman
- Our Father's Gold • novelette by Elisabeth Waters
- Thunderbird Road • novelette by Leslie Fish
- Scarborough Fair • novelette by Elizabeth Ann Scarborough
- Soulfedge Rock • short story by Suzette Haden Elgin
- Ever After • short story by Paula Lalish
- The Impossible Place • short story by Alan Dean Foster
- A Hole in the Sky • short story by Margaret Ball
- Drift • novelette by Steven Brust
- Heavenside Song • short story by Warren Norwood
- Swan Song • shortstory by Lyn McConchie
- Space Station Annie • short story by Cynthia McQuillin
- Roundelay • shortstory by Mary C. Pangborn
- The Last Song of Sirit Byar • novelette by Peter S. Beagle
- To Drive the Cold Winter Away • short story by Marion Zimmer Bradley
- Bluesberry Jam • novelette by Gene Wolfe
