= The Death of a Legend =

1981 novel by Robert Adams

- Author: Robert Adams
- Language: English
- Publisher: New American Library
- Publication date: 1981

The Death of a Legend is a 1981 novel written by Robert Adams.

== Plot summary ==
The Death of a Legend is a novel in which Thoheeks Bili Morguhn and his companions narrowly escape a cataclysm triggered by the Witchmen, only to find themselves in a perilous region inhabited by mutated, half-human beings. Faced with the choice of retreating through a devastated landscape or confronting the unknown, Bili's dilemma quickly escalates into open conflict.

== Publication history ==
The Death of a Legend by Robert Adams, is part of the acclaimed Horseclans series.

== Reception ==
C. J. Henderson reviewed The Death of a Legend for Pegasus magazine and stated that "The Death of a Legend is a good, solid novel, a welcome addition to the Horseclan series, and a great book to start 1982 off with. Now, who could ask for more than that?"

== Reviews ==
- Review by C. J. Henderson [as by Chris Henderson] (1982) in Dragon Magazine, February 1982
