= Carol Severance =

American novelist

Carol Severance (1944 – February 19, 2015) was a U.S. science fiction writer.

== Life ==
Carol Severance was a Hawaii-based Science Fiction and Fantasy writer known for her strong female characters. As an artist she had a special interest in Pacific Island peoples and their environments. In high school she held the Amateur Rocketry Association's High Altitude Record. After growing up in Denver and earning an art degree, she served with the Peace Corps on remote atolls in Micronesia and traveled interisland on traditional sailing canoes. She found that her oil paints were too dull to capture the vivid colors of the reefs and lagoons, so she began “painting with words” by keeping a detailed journal of people and cultural events. She later assisted with anthropological field work in Micronesia, and went on to earn an M.A. in journalism at the University of South Carolina. She was a news editor and feature writer and did many feature stories for the Hawaii Tribune Herald. She graduated from the 1984 Clarion West Science Fiction Writer's Workshop. Carol wrote short stories, a prize-winning play and published four novels. Reefsong won the 1992 Compton Crook Award for the Best First Novel in the Field. The Island Warrior Series; Demon Drums, Storm Caller, and Sorcerous Sea are based partly on Pacific Island folklore, environments, and the conflict between good and evil. All her novels are available through Open Road Media.

Severance was born in Ohio and grew up in Denver, Colorado. She served with the Peace Corps from 1966 to 1968 and later assisted in anthropological fieldwork in the remote coral atolls of Chuuk, Micronesia. She lived in Hilo, Hawaii with her husband, former Peace Corps volunteer Craig J. Severance.

== Writing ==
Much of Severance's writing includes references to Pacific Island lore and lifestyle.

Severance won the Compton Crook Award for her debut novel, Reefsong, in 1991.

== Publications ==
=== Island Warrior series ===
1. Demon Drums (1992)
2. Storm Caller (1993)
3. Sorcerous Sea (1993)

=== Other novels ===
- Reefsong (1991) - Compton Crook Award winner for best first novel of 1991.

=== Short stories ===
- "Day of Strange Fortune" (1987)
- "Isle of Illusion" (1987)
- "Shark-Killer" (1988)
- "Whispering Cane" (1990)

=== Anthologies containing her work ===
- Magic in Ithkar 4 (1987)
- Tales of the Witch World 3 (1990)

=== Plays ===
- "Sail to the Edge of the Moon" (1988)
