= Too Long a Sacrifice =

- Author: Mildred Broxon
- Publication date: 1981

Too Long a Sacrifice is a novel by Mildred Downey Broxon published in 1981.

== Plot summary ==
Too Long a Sacrifice is a novel in which the bard Tadgh MacNaill of Northern Ireland goes to live in the underwater city of the Sidhe.

== Reception ==
Greg Costikyan reviewed Too Long a Sacrifice in Ares Magazine #9 and commented that "The main strength of Too Long a Sacrifice is Broxon's firm grip on the Irish mythos and an ability to evoke its power and a mood of wonder in the reader. Its main weakness is the prose, which is no more than competent and rather stilted in places. On the whole, however, it is head and shoulders above most of the fantasy being published today, and well worth reading."

== Reviews ==
- Review by Michael Stamm (1981) in Fantasy Newsletter, #39 August 1981
- Review by Chris Henderson (1981) in Dragon Magazine, #56, December 1981
- Review by Baird Searles (1982) in Isaac Asimov's Science Fiction Magazine, January 18, 1982
- Review by Joan Gordon (1985) in Fantasy Review, March 1985
