= Druid's Blood =

Druid's Blood is a fantasy novel by American writer Esther M. Friesner, published by Signet Books in 1988.

== Plot summary ==
Druid's Blood takes place in an alternate Victorian England based on the idea that druidic and Celtic magic scared away the Romans, allowing a line of magical royalty to persist since then.

The plot surrounds the theft of a magical tome that is the key to Queen Victoria's royal powers. With dark forces rising to smite England, it is up to consulting detective Brihtric Donne and his associate Dr. John H. Weston to save the day.

== Reception ==
J. Michael Caparula reviewed Druid's Blood in Space Gamer/Fantasy Gamer No. 85. Caparula commented that "the writing is beautifully fluid and there is ample humor and plenty of in-jokes for the dedicated Sherlockian. A fair but promising novel."

== Reviews ==
- Review by Tom Whitmore (1988) in Locus, #330 July 1988
- Review by Algis Budrys (1988) in The Magazine of Fantasy & Science Fiction, November 1988
- Review by Baird Searles (1989) in Isaac Asimov's Science Fiction Magazine, January 1989
- Review by Wendy Bradley (1990) in Interzone, #35 May 1990
- Kliatt
