= Magic in Ithkar =

1985 anthology edited by Andre Norton and Robert Adams

- Cover art from the first edition
- Author: Andre Norton and Robert Adams (editors)
- Cover artist: Walter Velez
- Language: English
- Series: Magic in Ithkar
- Genre: Fantasy short stories
- Publisher: Tor Books
- Publication date: 1985
- Publication place: United States
- Media type: Print (paperback)
- Pages: 317
- ISBN: 0-8125-4740-3
- OCLC: 12043322
- Followed by: Magic in Ithkar 2

Magic in Ithkar is a shared world anthology of fantasy stories edited by Andre Norton and Robert Adams. It was first published as a trade paperback by Tor Books in May 1985 and later reprinted as a standard paperback in April 1988 under the alternate title Magic in Ithkar 1.

== Summary ==
The book collects thirteen original short stories by various fantasy authors which share the setting of an annual fair in the city of Ithkar, together with an introduction by Adams and notes on the authors by Norton.

== Setting ==
As described in the introduction by co-editor Robert Adams, the world of which Ithkar is a part has suffered from some past holocaust which wiped out an earlier, higher civilization. Subsequently, the area which became Ithkar became a base for the explorations of three godlike visitors, who came to be worshiped as actual deities after their departure. A temple and priesthood dedicated to them developed over succeeding generations, which held a yearly fair on the anniversary of the visitors' first arrival. The city of Ithkar grew up about the temple on the strength of the commerce the fair attracted.

The historical background provided appears science fictional in nature; the war that destroyed the previous culture is related in terms which suggest a nuclear war, complete with radiation-derived mutations of life-forms in the vicinities of the nuclear strikes, while the story of the visitors resembles an expedition of interstellar explorers. Present-day Ithkar is, however, a fantasy setting, in which wizards and sorcerers are rife, and magic works.

== Contents ==
- "Prologue" (Robert Adams)
- "The Goblinry of Ais" (Lin Carter)
- "To Take a Thief" (C. J. Cherryh)
- "Jezeri and Her Beast Go to the Fair and Find More Excitement Than They Want" (Jo Clayton)
- "Fletcher Found" (Morgan Llywelyn)
- "Well Met in Ithkar" (Patricia Mathews)
- "Esmene's Eyes" (Ardath Mayhar)
- "Swamp Dweller" (Andre Norton)
- "Qazia and a Ferret-Fetch" (Judith Sampson)
- "For Lovers Only" (Roger C. Schlobin)
- "Dragon's Horn" (J. W. Schutz)
- "Homecoming" (Susan M. Shwartz)
- "The Prince Out of the Past" (Nancy Springer)
- "Cold Spell" (Elisabeth Waters)
- "Biographical Notes" (Andre Norton)

== Reception ==
Reviewing the trade paperback edition, John Gregory Betancourt wrote a positive review despite acknowledging its flaws. His main criticism is that "the stories ... have conflicting details, as if the writers didn't have enough background information to work from". Accordingly, "[t]here is no real sense of unity ... and for a series anthology this is a major problem. Some writers [took] a science-fiction viewpoint; others used high fantasy, and still others sword & sorcery". He also criticizes the editors for arranging the stories alphabetically by author; "[a]s a result, the book starts with futility and ends with a cute minor tale. The two best stories are bunched at the beginning and all the ones toward the end have the same tone". A different arrangement "would've helped this book to have a strong opening and close". Turning to the stories themselves he singles out "three first class stories: those by Cherryh (best in book), Llywelyn, and Springer", and takes note of Carter's as "essentially, a study in futility -- though well-written and engagingly told. The remainder range from fair to good" except for Clayton's, Sampson's and Schlobin's. Summing up, he notes that "inconsistencies aside, it's an entertaining book, and worth your time in its mass-market paperback edition, if you want to wait that long".

The book was also reviewed by Mary Ann McIntyre Nixon in Fantasy Review v. 8, no. 7 (no. 81), July 1985.
