= Horseclans =

Science fiction series by Robert Adams

- Author: Robert Adams
- Country: American
- Language: English
- No. of books: 18

Horseclans is a science fiction series by American writer Robert Adams, set in a North America that had been thrown back to a medieval level by a full-scale nuclear war.

== Background ==
The books mainly concern the doings of the "Horseclans", a nomadic people originating from the "Sea of Grass"—the Great Plains from present-day southern Canada to central Texas, and from the Mississippi River to the Rocky Mountains. The Horseclansmen are portrayed as fierce, noble and often gifted with telepathy, which came in handy for their dealings with their horses and "cats"—sabertoothed tigers that had been revived by scientific means in the years before the nuclear war.

Some people, including the Horseclans' founder and mentor-figure, Milo Morai, were "Undying"—effectively immortal or at least unaging and almost impossible to kill by means other than suffocation, drowning and decapitation. The Undying were also sterile, which was a source of anguish for some of them.

The known Undying were:

- Milo (who did not know his own age due to amnesia caused by a head wound in 1936)
- Bookermann (once a German cavalry officer)
- Mara (an Ehleen noblewoman who marries Milo)
- Aldora (an orphaned Ehleen girl taken in by one of the Horseclans)
- Demetrios (the Ehleen High Lord and the only Undying to perish during the course of the books)
- Drehkos (Nobleman of Morguhn involved in the Great Rebellion)
- Tim and Giliahna (the children of a Horseclans chief)
- Neeka (an Ehleen physician who later also marries Milo)

In addition, Bookerman mentions two other Undying, one of whom he claims is dead.

Although not among the Undying, two other major characters are extremely long-lived, Hari Krooguh being almost two hundred years old when last mentioned in the books, and Bili Morguhn, aka Bili the Axe, remaining active until his death from bear-inflicted injuries at the age of almost a century. In addition, both Hari and Bili possess extraordinarily strong mental powers of telekinesis and illusion (as does Aldora).

The Horseclans looked down on "dirtmen", or farmers, and by extension all non-nomads, although they later resettled on the East coast. Many "Dirtman" communities were descended from odd, out-of-the-mainstream groups of Americans, and often had religious beliefs that were unpleasant at best.

The main civilization in North America during most of the books is that of the "Ehleens"—a conglomeration of Greek-speaking Mediterranean peoples who had invaded the eastern half of North America and set up kingdoms. The main Ehleen kingdom, Kenooryos Ehlas (New Greece), was dominated by a thoroughly corrupt, debased version of the Greek Orthodox Church, and the conduct of whose rulers was, in some ways, also reminiscent of Hellenistic kings.

Other peoples the Horseclans dealt with were "Mehrikans", "Ahrmenee", "Mehikos", "Ganiks", and "Witchmen". "Mehrikans" were descendants of present-day Americans. "Ahrmenee" were descendants of present-day Armenians living in the Appalachian Mountains. "Mehikos" were descendants of present-day Mexico.

The "Ganiks" were degraded descendants of hippie communes, whose religion of "Orghanikonservashun" (organic-conservation) forbade them to eat animal meat (but not human meat; Ganiks were enthusiastic cannibals), bathe, or hot-work metal (due to the pollution caused by burning coal). They also have a slave caste who worship "Pozahjizm"(pacfism); any violent act on their behalf, even in self-defense, is punished by on-the-spot execution.

The "Witchmen" were a cult of scientists operating out of a research center in central Florida, and the only faction who have retained pre-apocalyptic technology, most importantly(and notoriously) a mechanical mind-transfer technology that permit their leadership functional immortality through transferring their minds into young bodies. However, they are maintained as the most dangerous faction of Adams' world; weak, corrupt and tactically unskilled due to their addiction to the comforts of pre-war civilization, and only retaining power through the centuries via their monopoly on pre-war weapons, which the Undying steadfastly suppress in their own territories.

In a similar fashion to the world of Robert E. Howard's Conan and of Jack London novels, civilization is seen as having a softening and corrupting influence in comparison to the hardy Ahrmenee and the Horseclans, although not to the extent that they outweigh the peace and prosperity that Milo and others work towards.

== Novels ==
The novels of the Horseclans series are the following:

1. The Coming of the Horseclans (1975)
2. Swords of the Horseclans (1976)
3. Revenge of the Horseclans (1977)
4. A Cat of Silvery Hue (1979)
5. The Savage Mountains (1979)
6. The Patrimony (1980)
7. Horseclans Odyssey (1981)
8. The Death of a Legend (1981)
9. The Witch Goddess (1982)
10. Bili the Axe (1982)
11. Champion of the Last Battle (1983)
12. A Woman of the Horseclans (1983)
13. Horses of the North (1985)
14. A Man Called Milo Morai (1986)
15. The Memories of Milo Morai (1986)
16. Trumpets of War (1987)
17. Madman's Army (1987)
18. The Clan of the Cats (1988)

In addition to the novels, there are two short story anthologies containing stories by both Robert Adams and others set in the Horseclans setting: Friends of the Horseclans (1987) and Friends of the Horseclans 2 (1989).

The GURPS system had a worldbook (GURPS Horseclans) and a solo adventure (GURPS Bili the Axe – Up Harzburk!) devoted to the series.

== Cover art ==
The original series, published by Signet, featured artwork by fantasy illustrator Ken Kelly. Part of the series was later published by Futura in the United Kingdom with new cover art by Luis Royo. Mundania Press is planning on re-publishing the entire series, the first of which (The Coming of the Horseclans) features artwork by Stacey L. King. At some point there were also covers done by Carl Lundgren of 1960s psychedelic album-cover fame and Chris Achilléos for UK-only editions.
