= The Chick is in the Mail =

Fantasy anthology book by Esther Friesner

The Chick Is in the Mail
- Cover of first edition.
- Author: Edited by Esther Friesner and Martin H. Greenberg
- Cover artist: Larry Elmore
- Language: English
- Series: Chicks in Chainmail
- Genre: Fantasy
- Publisher: Baen Books
- Publication date: October 2000
- Publication place: United States
- Media type: Print (paperback)
- Pages: 314 pp.
- ISBN: 0-671-31950-7
- OCLC: 45178180
- LC Class: CPB Box no. 1888 vol. 6
- Preceded by: Chicks 'n Chained Males
- Followed by: Turn the Other Chick

The Chick Is in the Mail is an anthology of fantasy stories, edited by Esther Friesner with the assistance of Martin H. Greenberg, with a cover by Larry Elmore. It consists of works featuring female protagonists by (mostly) female authors. It was first published in paperback by Baen Books in October 2000; a hardcover edition was issued the same year. It was the fourth of a number of similarly themed anthologies edited by Friesner.

The book collects 15 short stories and novelettes and one poem by various fantasy authors, with an introduction by Friesner and a section of notes about the authors.

== Contents ==
- "Introduction" (Esther Friesner)
- "To His Iron-Clad Mistress" (poem) (Kent Patterson)
- "Sweet Charity" (Elizabeth Moon)
- "The Catcher in the Rhine" (Harry Turtledove)
- "With the Knight Male (Apologies to Rudyard Kipling)" (Charles Sheffield)
- "Patterns in the Chain" (Steven Piziks)
- "Arms and the Woman" (Nancy Kress)
- "Fun with Hieroglyphics" (Margaret Ball)
- "Troll by Jury" (Esther Friesner)
- "Looking for Rhonda Honda" (William Sanders)
- "The Case of Prince Charming" (Robin Wayne Bailey)
- "Incognito, Ergo Sum" (Karen Everson)
- "Chain of Command" (Leslie What and Nina Kiriki Hoffman)
- "The Thief & The Roller Derby Queen: An Essay on the Importance of Formal Education" (Eric Flint)
- "The Right Bitch" (Doranna Durgin)
- "Foxy Boxer Gal Fights Giant Monster King!" (Pierce Askegren)
- "Hallah Iron-Thighs and the Change of Life" (K. D. Wentworth)
- "About the Authors" (uncredited)
