= King Estmere =

Traditional song

King Estmere is an English and Scottish Child ballad and number 60 of 305 ballads collected by Francis James Child.

== Synopsis ==
King Estmere's brother Alder the Younger urges him to marry King Adland's daughter, and suggests that he look at the lady himself, rather than be deceived by any description. Once there, King Adland warns them that she put off the King of Spain, but he has her come down and she agrees to marry him, despite the threats of the King of Spain. King Estmere leaves, the King of Spain attacks, and the daughter sent a page after King Estmere to warn him of her danger. Adler is the son of a magician-woman and enchants King Estmere into the shape of a harper and himself into his boy. They infiltrate the castle, Alder kills the King of Spain, and the two fight off all his men. King Estmere and the daughter marry.

== Variants ==
Various motifs similar to this ballad have appeared in Scandinavian ballads, but there are no actual foreign variants.

== Literature ==
Josepha Sherman retold this in King's Son, Magic's Son (1994).

In Bevis: the Story of a Boy by Richard Jefferies King Estmere is the favourite ballad of Bevis.

== See also ==
- List of the Child Ballads
