= Robert Adams' Book of Alternate Worlds =

- Cover of first edition
- Editors: Robert Adams; Martin H. Greenberg; Pamela Crippen Adams
- Cover artist: Ken W. Kelly
- Language: English
- Genre: Science fiction
- Publisher: Signet Books
- Publication date: 1987
- Publication place: United States
- Media type: Print (paperback)
- Pages: 366 pp.
- ISBN: 0-451-14894-0

Robert Adams' Book of Alternate Worlds is an anthology of alternate history short works edited by Robert Adams, Martin H. Greenberg and Pamela Crippen Adams. It was first published in paperback by Signet Books in July 1987.

The book collects nine short stories by various authors, together with an introductory essay by Robert Adams.

== Contents ==
- "Introduction" (Robert Adams)
- "The Other World" (Murray Leinster)
- "Target: Berlin!" (George Alec Effinger)
- "Adept's Gambit" (Fritz Leiber)
- "Last Enemy" (H. Beam Piper)
- "Aristotle and the Gun" (L. Sprague de Camp)
- "There's a Wolf in My Time Machine" (Larry Niven)
- "Many Mansions" (Robert Silverberg)
- "Remember the Alamo!" (T. R. Fehrenbach)
- "One Way Street" (Jerome Bixby)
