= A Birthday =

"A Birthday" is a 1995 science fiction short story by American writer Esther Friesner, about abortion. It was first published in the Magazine of Fantasy & Science Fiction.

== Plot summary ==
Women who have had abortions are forced to view and interact with computerized recreations of the hypothetical children they could have had.

== Reception ==
"A Birthday" won the 1996 Nebula Award for Best Short Story, and was a finalist for the 1996 Hugo Award for Best Short Story.

At the SF Site, Dave Truesdale called it "fascinating, if disturbing", noting that while it was "as fresh as tomorrow's headlines", it was nonetheless evocative of material published "in the (19)50s heyday of Galaxy."

Friesner has described the story as "super-dark".
