= Paula Volsky =

American fantasy author

- Education: Vassar College; University of Birmingham (MA)
- Occupation: Author
- Writing career
- Genre: Fantasy

Paula Volsky is an American fantasy author.

== Biography ==
Paula Volsky was born in Fanwood, New Jersey. She majored in English literature at liberal arts college, Vassar, in New York State, where she became friendly with Esther Friesner and Jane Bishop. Together, they wrote at least one film script for student production, Lavinia: a Girl of the Street, which demonstrated Volsky's trademark tongue-in-cheek style. At the University of Birmingham, England, she received an M.A. in Shakespearian studies. Before writing fantasy, she sold real estate and also worked for the U.S. Department of Housing and Urban Development.

After releasing novels regularly for nearly twenty years, Volsky published no new work for nearly a decade, even though Locus had reported her sale of a "new fantasy trilogy" to Bantam Books in mid-2000. After a long delay, the publisher announced that the final volume had been completed, and that it would issue the books beginning in late 2011.

Terri Windling described Volsky as "a reliably entertaining storyteller." All her novels written under her own name take place within the same fictional world, often with fantasy plot-lines inspired by historical events.

== Bibliography ==
=== Novels ===
- The Curse of the Witch-Queen. Ballantine, 1982. ISBN 0-345-29520-X
- Sorcerer series
  - The Sorcerer's Lady. Ace, 1986. ISBN 0-441-77533-0
  - The Sorcerer's Heir. Ace, 1988. ISBN 0-441-77231-5
  - The Sorcerer's Curse. Ace, 1989. ISBN 0-441-44458-X
- The Luck of Relian Kru. Ace, 1987. ISBN 0-441-83816-2
- Illusion. London: Gollancz, 1991. ISBN 0-575-05138-8
- The Wolf of Winter. Bantam Spectra, 1993. ISBN 0-553-37210-6
- The Gates of Twilight. Bantam Spectra, 1996. ISBN 0-553-37394-3
- The White Tribunal. Bantam Spectra, 1997. ISBN 0-553-37846-5
- The Grand Ellipse. Bantam Spectra, 2000. ISBN 0-553-10804-2
- The Veiled Isles Trilogy
  - The Traitor's Daughter. Bantam Spectra, 2011. ISBN 0-553-58380-8 (as Paula Brandon)
  - The Ruined City. Bantam Spectra, 2012. ISBN 978-0-553-58382-3 (as Paula Brandon)
  - The Wanderers. Bantam Spectra, 2012. ISBN 978-0-553-58383-0 (as Paula Brandon)

=== Short fiction ===
- "The Traditions of Karzh" in Songs of the Dying Earth, ed. George R. R. Martin and Gardner Dozois, Subterranean Press, 2009. ISBN 978-1-59606-213-9
- "Giant Rat of Sumatra" in Resurrected Holmes, ed. Marvin Kaye, St. Martin's. ISBN 0-312-15639-1
