= Shadowdance (novel) =

1991 novel by Robin Wayne Bailey

Shadowdance is a novel by Robin Wayne Bailey published by White Wolf Books in 1991.

== Plot summary ==
Shadowdance is a novel in which the disabled orphan Innowen is given mobility from sundown to sunrise by a witch as long as he dances every single night.

== Reception ==
Maryanne Booth reviewed Shadowdance for Arcane magazine, rating it a 3 out of 10 overall. Booth comments that "The only thing that differentiates this novel from others of its genre is that homosexuality is very heavily hinted at and apparently quite acceptable. Innowen forms a rather close relationship with his male companion, which nobody questions as being extraordinary. The two gratuitous scenes describing some rather nasty sexual acts are the only things that makes this book an adult read."
