= Videssos cycle =

Novel series by Harry Turtledove

The Videssos cycle (sometimes also referred to as the Lost Legion series) is a fantasy novel series by Harry Turtledove and set in the Videssos fictional universe. Turtledove uses his knowledge of Byzantine Empire history and military experience extensively within the story.

== Novels ==
- Videssos series
  - The Misplaced Legion (1987)
  - An Emperor for the Legion (1987)
  - The Legion of Videssos (1987)
  - Swords of the Legion (1987)
- The Tale of Krispos series
  - Krispos Rising (1991)
  - Krispos of Videssos (1991)
  - Krispos the Emperor (1994)
- The Time of Troubles series
  - The Stolen Throne (1995)
  - Hammer and Anvil (1996)
  - The Thousand Cities (1997)
  - Videssos Besieged (1998)
- The Bridge of the Separator (2005)

== Plot summary ==
During an encounter with a Celtic force, a Roman legion is magically transported to another world when the two opposing leaders' swords touch. The Roman force and Celtic leader find themselves in an empire called Videssos. This empire hires them as a mercenary force to help defend their lands from an enemy nation, Yezd. It quickly becomes apparent to the leader of the legionaries, Marcus Aemilius Scaurus, that the Empire is rife with political intrigue. With steadfast loyalty to the Emperor and a certain bull-headedness, Marcus manages to safely navigate the particularly dangerous political landscape and advance the place of himself and his men.

At a party to celebrate the arrival of the Romans held by the Emperor Mavrikios, Marcus, slightly inebriated, slips on the floor and bumps into the emissary of Yezd, Avshar. He tries to apologize, but is rebuffed and a duel results. Marcus wins, but chooses to spare Avshar rather than kill a helpless man. Avshar then sends an assassin after Marcus, but the assassin fails and the Emperor uses this attack as an excuse to declare war upon Yezd.

Avshar leads the enemy army of Yezd nomad warriors against Mavrikios' Videssos soldiers and mercenary forces. When Avshar casts a magic spell at the commander of the left wing, Ortaias Sphrantzes, the entire wing of the army is set into chaos as Ortaias turns his horse and flees at full speed. Only the quick actions of Gaius Philippus, the sub-commander of the legion and the aid of a clever ally Laon Pakhymer kept them from falling to the nomad forces. Mavrikios, seeing his grand army destroyed, leads a charge of his personal bodyguards directly at Avshar, hoping that he can at least take the life of this one great enemy. He fails and is struck down. His brother Thorisin, leader of the right wing of the army, is forced to flee and Yezd wins the battle.

Both Ortaias and Thorisin declare they are emperor of Videssos after the battle, but Ortaias, with the help of his uncle, controls Videssos the city. Civil war erupts. Eventually, Thorisin emerges victorious as the citizens inside the city turn on Ortaias and open the gates for Thorisin's troops. It is revealed that the leader of the city guards put in place by Ortaias is none other than Avshar in disguise. Avshar manages to escape.

In an attempt to bolster his forces, Thorisin sends emissaries to other countries to recruit more mercenaries for his Empire. Unfortunately, before he can organize any such force, a group of his own mercenaries turn on him and declare the western half of the empire their own. Thorisin sends a force, including the Legionaries, to the west to put down the rebelling mercenaries while he deals with threats to the east. Half the western army turns in favor of the usurpers, and Marcus is forced to take over and do the best that he can to follow Thorisin's orders. He engages in guerrilla tactics that eventually bring down the mercenary usurpers.

As he is bringing the leaders of the rebellion back to Thorisin in Videssos the City, he is betrayed by his wife, who frees her brother and the rest of the prisoners. He returns to Videssos in shame. While suffering through the betrayal of his wife, Marcus begins a relationship with Alypia, Thorisin's niece. When discovered, he is hauled to jail to await his fate. Thorisin sentences him to death, but commutes the sentence provided that Marcus, alone, remove from power a heretic to the west. Marcus agrees on the condition that he can openly pay suit to Alypia. Thorisin agrees and sets Marcus on a boat to his destination.

After successfully defeating the heretic, Marcus flees the city in front of an advancing barbarian army (his own Legion coming to rescue him.) He signs up with a caravan train and ends up going to Mashiz, capitol of Yezd. There he witnesses the overthrow of the King of Yezd by Avshar. Fleeing Avshar, Marcus manages to escape in the company of an army of nomads who have come to seek revenge upon the Yezd. Together they flee to the east to find Thorisin and plan a campaign against Avshar and Yezd.

At the final battle, Avshar kills the Videssian Patriarch and seems on the edge of total victory when Marcus and Viridovix touch their blades to one another again and the released magic transports Avshar to another world, apparently Skotos' hell. These acts lead to Marcus being granted a title, a significant position in the empire and permission to marry Alypia.

== Fictional universe ==
"Videssos" can mean either the Empire of Videssos, or its capital city. The Videssian Empire is very similar to the Byzantine Empire, and much of its history and geography is analogous to Byzantine history. The main differences are the religion, the existence of magic as a usable force, and some details of the history of surrounding states. These states strongly resemble neighbours of Byzantine Empire – for instance, Makuran is Sassanid Persia and Vaspurakan is Armenia (Vaspurakan is in reality a historic Armenian province). The map shown of the known world in the time of the various Videssos stories is based on Mediterranean region, flipped east to west.

Like Byzantium, Videssos is an absolute monarchy, ruled by an Emperor. The Emperor is assisted by a numerous, influential bureaucracy. The bureaucracy and military are traditionally rivals for power and influence. Even Videssian offices and titles are the same as the Byzantine ones (e.g. autokrator, sebastokrator, vestiarios, drungarios).

The Videssian emperors and their history strongly resemble the Byzantine emperors.

- Genesios is the usurper Phocas.
- Maniakes, the main protagonist of the Time of Troubles series is Emperor Heraclius, and the name recalls the famed general George Maniakes.
- Anthimos III, the dissolute emperor, is Michael III the Drunkard.
- Krispos, of the Tale of Krispos series, is Basil I, with elements of John I Tzimiskes and Basil II.
- Mavrikios Gavras, of the original Videssos Cycle, resembles Romanos IV Diogenes, and the two rival imperial families, the Gavras and the Sphrantzes, are analogous to the Komnenos and the Doukas dynasties.

The Videssian Empire is rather feudal, with powerful landowners wielding great influence. The class of yeoman farmers, who provided much of the best recruits for the military, is dwindling, analogously to what happened at several stages of Byzantine history.

== Characters ==
- Marcus Aemilius Scaurus - Tribune of the Legion. Trained in the stoic arts, he is able to keep his head in the most trying and surprising of situations.
- Gaius Philippus - Senior Centurion of the Legion. Career military man.
- Viridovix son of Drappes - Leader of the Celtic forces. He loves war, wine, and wenching.
- Gorgidas - Greek physician for the Legion. Sharp-tongued and acerbic.
- Mavrikios Gavras - Avtokrator of Videssos. A successful leader of a rebellion, he has a temper tempered by years as emperor.
- Thorisin Gavras - Brother of Mavrikios. Hot-headed and impetuous, he is blunt, direct, and very competitive.
- Vardanes Sphrantzes - Leader of the administrative functionaries of the empire (called pen-pushers.) His uncle was the immediately preceding Avtokrator and he craves both power and Alypia.
- Alypia Gavras - Only child of Mavrikios. She is quiet, studious, and reserved. When pushed, she does show a temper similar to that of her father and uncle.
- Avshar - Sorcerer. Leader of the Yezd forces plaguing Videssos. He delights in cruelty and has waged a long campaign against Videssos.

== Reception ==
Anna Wołek noted that the series is not among Turtledove's most popular works. Wołek, Edgeworth and Stypczynski discussed how Turtledove reused numerous elements of history of the real ancient world (in particular, Rome), in his world building in the Videssos cycle.
