= Tom Wood (artist) =

Canadian artist (1913-1997)

- Born: Thomas Charles Wood; May 2, 1913; Ottawa, Ontario
- Died: October 28, 1997 (aged 84); Ottawa, Ontario
- Education: studied with F.H. Varley, and Franklin Brownell at the Ottawa Art Association
- Known for: painter; Official War Artist in the Royal Canadian Navy; participant in the D-Day landings; designer

Tom Wood (May 02, 1913 – October 28, 1997) was a painter, graphic artist, designer and Official War Artist in the Royal Canadian Navy. He was a participant in the D-Day landings.

== Career ==
Wood was born in Ottawa and was largely self-taught as an artist but had some training with F.H. Varley and Franklin Brownell at the Ottawa Art Association. He worked as a commercial artist in the 1930s - there are six of Wood's sketchbooks dating from 1933 to 1937 in Library and Archives Canada, mostly of his environs in Ottawa.

He joined the Royal Canadian Navy Volunteer Reserves on 23 May 1943 at HMCS Carleton in Ottawa. He served in the Directorate of Special Services at naval headquarters in Ottawa where he worked as a designer, then he sailed for England on a troop carrier as an Official War Artist (1944-1946).

While overseas he was present at the D-Day landings in Normandy. He later said about being there:

"The craft was pitching around too roughly to permit any sketching, so I stood up and took pictures with a borrowed camera, made careful notes of colors [sic] and of other details, and did my sketches and paintings later. Snipers were firing at us, but their aim was poor; only one man in our whole flotilla was wounded".

Later, he painted 75 works from the photographs that he shot that morning. In the months that followed, he saw service abroad ships such as corvettes and frigates. In 1945 he painted naval activity in and off Newfoundland, the harbour of St. John's and other naval bases in the Maritimes.

After the war he became chief designer at the Canadian Government Exhibition Commission, and finally chief of design and displays for the National Museums of Canada. He also contributed to the Canadian Pavilion at Expo 67. When he retired in 1975, Wood embarked with five artist friends on a series of painting expeditions to Newfoundland. The "Gang of Six" had an exhibition at the McPherson Gallery in Ottawa in 1984. He continued to paint in the 1990s. Tom Wood died in Ottawa in 1997.

His work is in the permanent collections of the Canadian War Museum and the Ottawa Art Gallery.
