= Wen Spencer =

American speculative fiction writer (born 1963)

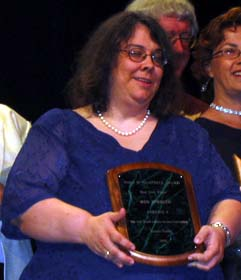
- Spencer accepting the John W. Campbell Award for Best New Writer at Worldcon 2003 in Toronto
- Born: 1963 (age 62–63)
- Education: University of Pittsburgh
- Occupation: Writer
- Writing career
- Genres: Science fiction; fantasy
- Notable awards: John W. Campbell Award for Best New Writer (2003)
- Website: www.wenspencer.com

Wen Spencer (born 1963) is an American science fiction and fantasy writer whose books center on characters with unusual abilities. In 2003, she was the winner of the John W. Campbell Award for Best New Writer.

Spencer was raised on a family farm in Evans City, Pennsylvania and attended the University of Pittsburgh, earning a degree in information science, and has been active in science fiction fandom. Her Ukiah Oregon series features a partly alien character with gentle nature, powerful abilities, and dangerous, werewolf like relatives. Her Tinker universe features a young woman of extraordinary brilliance who is turned into an elf. A Brother's Price posits a world where the gender birth ratio is skewed heavily toward baby girls.

== Published works ==
=== Ukiah Oregon series ===
1. Alien Taste (2001), Compton Crook Award winner
2. Tainted Trail (2002)
3. Bitter Waters (2003)
4. Dog Warrior (2004)

=== Tinker (Elfhome) series ===
- Fantasy novels set in near-future Pittsburgh and Elfhome
1. Tinker (2003), 2004 Sapphire Award for the Best Science Fiction Romance novel
2. Wolf Who Rules (2006)
3. Elfhome (2012)
4. Wood Sprites (2014)
5. Harbinger - (April 2022)
6. Storm Furies - (August 2024)
- Project Elfhome - (2016) Collection of novelettes and short stories from the Elfhome series
- Steel City Magic – Science Fiction Book Club omnibus edition of Tinker and Wolf Who Rules (April 2006)
- Short stories set in the Elfhome Universe

=== Black Wolves of Boston ===
- The Black Wolves of Boston (2017)
- Black Tie and Tails (2025)

=== Stand-alone novels ===
- A Brother's Price (2005)
- Endless Blue (2007)
- Eight Million Gods (2013)

=== Short stories ===
- Set in the Elfhome Universe
  - "Wyvern" in Faire Tales (2004), Elfhome #0.5
  - "Bare Snow Falling on Fairywood" (2014), Elfhome #0.9
  - "Pittsburgh Backyard and Garden" in Free Short Stories 2013 (2013), Elfhome #1.1
  - "Blue Sky" (2012), Elfhome #2.5
  - "Peace Offering" in Free Short Stories 2012 (2012), Elfhome #3.1
- "Once Upon a Toad" in Fantastic Companions (2005)
- "Another Man's Meat" in Triangulation 2004: A Confluence of Speculative Fiction (2004)
- "Moon Monkeys" in Adventures in Sol System (2004)
- "Rituals for a New God" in Turn the Other Chick (2004)
- "Young Robots in Love" in Triangulation 2003: A Confluence of Speculative Fiction (2003)
- "Protection Money" in Jim Baen's Universe (2006), (later part of Elfhome #3)
