= Bili the Axe =

Bili the Axe is a 1983 novel written by Robert Adams.

== Plot summary ==
Bili the Axe is a novel in which post-catastrophe North America is dominated by feudal states east of the Mississippi River, in which the nomadic barbarian Horseclans contend with the surviving scientists known as the Witches who aim to rebuild the United States under their control.

== Reception ==
John T. Sapienza, Jr. reviewed Bili the Axe for Different Worlds magazine and stated that "I find the horseclans books exciting adventure stories, but I sometimes wonder whether it is proper to call them novels. Adams handles characterization and pacing well, but he never seems to get around to finishing the story at the end of the book. Bili The Axe is really a middle section of an extended story begun in book eight of the series, The Death of a Legend, and there is no telling how many books the reader is going to have to purchase to get to the end of it. In any case, you should either begin at the beginning of the series, or at least with Legend, before you read Bili.."
