= Josepha Sherman =

American novelist

- Born: December 12, 1946
- Died: August 23, 2012 (aged 65)
- Resting place: Hebrew Burial Association Cemetery, East Haven, Connecticut
- Occupations: Author; editor; folklorist
- Writing career
- Period: 1986–2012
- Genres: fantasy, science fiction
- Subjects: folklore, mythology
- Notable work: The Shining Falcon
- Notable awards: Compton Crook Award
- Website: www.sff.net/people/Josepha.Sherman/

Josepha Sherman (December 12, 1946 – August 23, 2012) was an American author, folklorist, and anthologist. In 1990 she won the Compton Crook Award for the novel The Shining Falcon.

== Works ==
=== Series ===
==== Buffyverse ====
- Visitors (1999) (with Laura Anne Gilman)
- Deep Water (2000) (with Laura Anne Gilman)

==== Find Your Fate Junior Transformers ====
9. The Invisibility Factor (1986)

==== Bardic Choices (with Mercedes Lackey) ====
1. A Cast of Corbies (1994)

==== Prince of the Sidhe ====
1. The Shattered Oath (1995)
2. Forging the Runes (1996)

=== Novels ===
- Golden Girl and the Crystal of Doom (1986)
- The Shining Falcon (1989) -- based on the Russian fairy tale The Feather of Finist the Falcon
- The Horse of Flame (1990)
- Child of Faerie, Child of Earth (1992) - based on the French fairy tale Graciosa and Percinet
- A Strange and Ancient Name (1992)
- Windleaf (1993)
- Gleaming Bright (1994)
- King's Son, Magic's Son (1994) -- based on the Child ballad King Estmere
- Son of Darkness (1998)

=== Series contributed to ===
- Secret of the Unicorn Queen
- Swept Away! (1988)
- The Dark Gods (1989)
- Swept Away / Sun Blind (2004) (with Gwen Hansen)

==== Bard's Tale ====
1. Castle of Deception (1992) (with Mercedes Lackey)
4. The Chaos Gate (1994)

==== Star Trek (with Susan Shwartz) ====
- Vulcan's Forge (1997)
- Vulcan's Heart (1999)
- Exodus: Vulcan's Soul Book One (2004)
- Exiles: Vulcan's Soul Trilogy Book Two (2006)
- Epiphany: Vulcan's Soul Trilogy Book Three (2007)

==== Highlander ====
- Highlander: The Captive Soul (1998)

==== Mage Knight ====
4. The Black Thorn Gambit (2004)

==== Gene Roddenberry's Andromeda ====
4. Through the Looking Glass (2005)

=== Anthologies edited ===
- A Sampler of Jewish-American Folklore (1992)
- Rachel the Clever: And Other Jewish Folktales (1993)
- Orphans of the Night (1995)
- In Celebration of Lammas Night (1995)
- Trickster Tales: Forty Folk Stories from Around the World (1996)
- Lammas Night (1996) (with Mercedes Lackey)
- Urban Nightmares (1997) (with Keith R.A. DeCandido)
- Merlin's Kin: World Tales of the Heroic Magician (1998)
- Told Tales: Nine Folktales from Around the World (1999)
- Magic Hoofbeats: Fabulous Horse Tales (2004)
- Young Warriors: Stories Of Strength (2005) (with Tamora Pierce)

=== Non-fiction ===
- Indian Tribes of North America (1986)
- Greasy Grimy Gopher Guts: The Subversive Folklore of Childhood (1995) (with T K F Weisskopf)
- The First Americans: Spirit of the Land and the People (1996)
- Xena: All I Need to Know I Learned from the Warrior Princess (1998)
- Artificial Intelligence (2000) (with Robert L Perry)
- Build Your Own Website (2000) (with Robert L Perry)
- Multimedia Magic (2000) (with Robert L Perry)
- Personal Computer Communications (2000) (with Robert L Perry)
- Bill Gates: Computer King (2000)
- Barrel Racing (2000)
- Bull Riding (2000)
- Jeff Bezos: King of Amazon (2001)
- Larry Ellison: Sheer Nerve (2001) (with Daniel Ehrenhaft)
- The Ear: Learning How We Hear (2001)
- The Upper Limbs: Learning about How We Use Our Arms, Elbows, Forearms, and Hands (2001)
- Samuel de Champlain: Explorer of the Great Lakes Region and Founder of Quebec (2002)
- Henry Hudson: English Explorer of the Northwest Passage (2002)
- Mythology for Storytellers (2002)
- Competitive Soccer for Girls (2002)
- Deep Space Observation Satellites (2003)
- The History of the Internet (2003)
- The History of the Personal Computer (2003)
- Internet Safety (2003)
- Flakes and Flurries: A Book about Snow (2003)
- Gusts and Gales: A Book about Wind (2003)
- Nature's Fireworks: A Book about Lightning (2003)
- Splish Splash!: A Book about Rain (2003)
- Sunshine: A Book about Sunlight (2003)
- Shapes in the Sky: A Book about Clouds (2003)
- The Cold War (2003)
- Your Travel Guide to Ancient China (2003)
- Your Travel Guide to Ancient Israel (2003)
- Geothermal Power (2003)
- Hydroelectric Power (2003)
- Nuclear Power (2003)
- Solar Power (2003)
- Wind Power (2003)
- It's a Www. World (2004)
- Fossil Fuel Power (2004)
- Queen Lydia Liliuokalani, Last Ruler of Hawaii (2004)

=== Anthologies contribution ===
- First Contact (1987)
- Sword and Sorceress IV (1987)
- Dragon Fantastic (1992)
- Alternate Warriors (1993)
- Alien Pregnant by Elvis (1994)
- Weird Tales from Shakespeare (1994
- Witch Fantastic (1994)
- Xanadu 3 (1994)
- Chicks in Chainmail (1995)
- Sherlock Holmes in Orbit (1995)
- Superheroes (1995)
- Don't Forget Your Spacesuit, Dear (1996)
- Future Net (1996)
- Otherwere (1996)
- The Shimmering Door (1996)
- Space Opera (1996)
- Elf Magic (1997)
- Return of the Dinosaurs (1997)
- Wizard Fantastic (1997)
- Zodiac Fantastic (1997)
- Black Cats and Broken Mirrors (1998)
- Chicks 'n Chained Males (1999)
- Children of the Night (1999)
- Flights of Fantasy (1999)
- Twice Upon a Time (1999)
- Civil War Fantastic (2000)
- Guardsmen of Tomorrow (2000)
- Perchance to Dream (2000)
- The First Heroes: New Tales of the Bronze Age (2004)
- Magic Tails (2005)
- Sword and Sorceress XXIV (2009)

=== Short stories ===
- The Magic-stealer (1991)
- Monsieur Verne and the Martian Invasion (1993) (collected in Mike Resnick's alternate history anthology Alternate Warriors)
- Ancient Magics, Ancient Hope (1994)
- The Defender of Central Park (1994)
- Racehorse Predicts the Future! (1994)
- The Case of the Purloined L'Isitek (1995)
- Old Woman Who Created Life (1995)
- Teacher's Pet (1995)
- Witch-Horse (1995)
- The Coyote Virus (1996)
- I've Got the Horse, Right Here (1996)
- Mother Knows Best (1996)
- One Late Night, with Jackal (1996)
- A Song of Strange Revenge (1996)
- Fangs for the Memory (1997)
- A Game of Mehen (1997)
- Ilian (1997)
- Netted (1997)
- Wild Hope (1997)
- The Cat Who Wasn't Black (1998)
- Feeding Frenzy Or the Further Adventures of the Frog Prince (1999)
- A Question of Faith (1999)
- Shiftless (1999)
- The Dreams That Stuff Is Made of (2000)
- Images (2000)
- The Silver Flame (2000)
- "A Hero for the Gods" (2004)
- Cat-Friend (2005)
- The Case Of The Haunted City (2009)

=== Television ===
- The Adventures of the Galaxy Rangers (1986)
