= Esther Friesner =

American novelist

- Friesner at Dragon Con 2026 in Atlanta, GA
- Born: Esther Mona Friesner; July 16, 1951 (age 75); New York City, U.S.
- Education: Vassar College (AB)
- Occupation: Author
- Writing career
- Genre: Fantasy

Esther Mona Friesner-Stutzman (née Friesner; born July 16, 1951) is an American science fiction and fantasy author. She is also a poet and playwright. She is best known for her humorous style of writing, both in the titles and the works themselves. This humor allows her to discuss with broader audiences issues like gender equality and social justice.

== Life ==
Friesner attended the Hunter College High School, a public magnet high school in New York City, as well as Vassar College. At Vassar, she completed A.B.s in both Spanish and Drama. While at Vassar, she became friendly with Paula Volsky and Jane Bishop. Together they wrote at least one film script for student production, "Lavinia: a Girl of the Street", which demonstrated Esther's trademark tongue-in-cheek style. She holds a Ph.D. in Spanish and was a college Spanish professor at Yale University before becoming a writer. She currently resides with her husband in Connecticut.

== Career ==
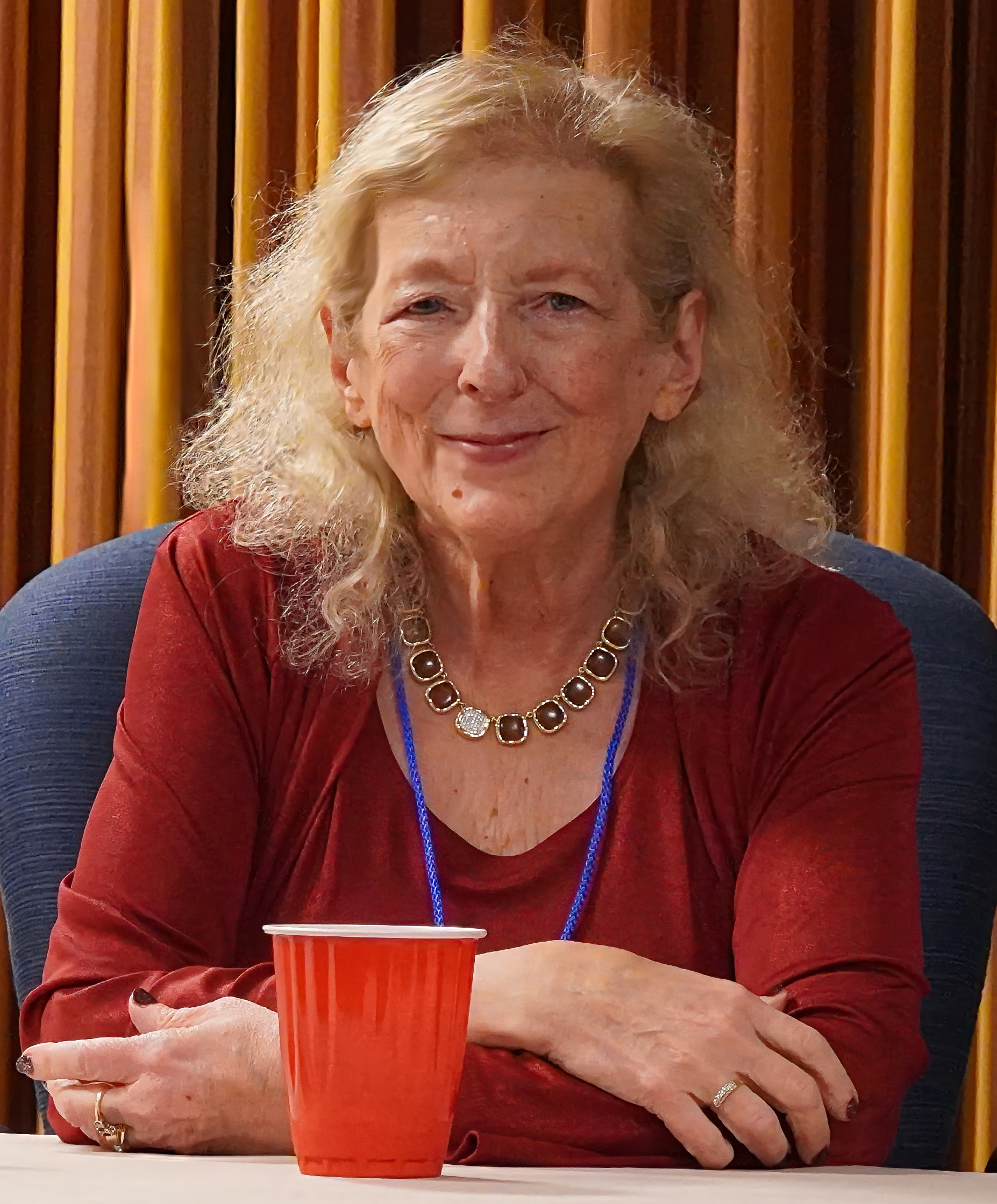
Friesner at RavenCon16 in Richmond VA in 2023

During her early career as a writer, Friesner penned an advice column entitled "Ask Auntie Esther" for Pulphouse Magazine. Her first short story, "The Stuff of Heroes" was sold in 1982.

In addition to short stories, Friesner has published a number of novels and is a prolific editor of anthologies. "Thunderbolt," a short story in Random House's Young Warriors anthology lead to creation of her recent books Nobody's Princess, which takes the Greek legend of Helen of Sparta and gives it a new beginning, and its sequel, Nobody's Prize.

Alien Pregnant By Elvis was her first effort as an anthology editor as part of a collection of tabloid science fiction for DAW books in conjunction with Martin H. Greenberg. She also collaborated with Greenberg on an Amazonian comedy anthology for Baen Books entitled Chicks In Chainmail and a vampire anthology for Donald I Fine, Inc. called Blood Muse.

She is a frequent guest of honor at science fiction conventions, having appeared at Bubonicon, Arisia, Boskone, Baycon and Albacon in the 1990s and in the 21st century. Her story "Love's Eldritch Ichor" was featured at one of these conventions, the World Fantasy convention, in 1990.

Friesner is credited as one of the founders of a parody movement in the 1980s called cyberprep.

== Awards ==
Friesner was named Outstanding New Fantasy Writer by Romantic Times in 1986. She won the Skylark Award in 1994. She has been nominated a number of times for the Hugo and Nebula awards, winning the Nebula Award for Best Short Story in 1995 and 1996 for, respectively, "Death and the Librarian" and "A Birthday". "A Birthday" was additionally a Hugo Award finalist in 1996. Her short story, "All Vows" was also a finalist for the Nebula in 1994 and took second place in Asimov's SF Magazine Readers' Poll in 1993.

Friesner's Star Trek: Deep Space Nine novel, Warchild, also made the USA TODAY bestseller list.

=== Nebula Awards and Nominations ===
- 1993- “All Vows”, published by Asimov’s Magazine, Nominated for Best Short Story
- 1995- “Jesus at the Bat” published by The Magazine of Fantasy and Science Fiction, Nominated for Best Novelette 1995
- 1995- “Death and the Librarian” published by Asimov’s Magazine, Winner, Best Short story
- 1996- “A Birthday” published by The Magazine of Fantasy and Science Fiction, Winner, Best Short Story
- 1999- “How to Make Unicorn Pie” published by The Magazine of Fantasy and Science Fiction, Nominated for Best Novelette
- 2001- Toastmaster for World Science Fiction Convention 2001
- 2006- “Helen Remembers the Stork Club”, published by The Magazine of Fantasy and Science Fiction, Nominated for Best Short Story of 2006

=== Locus Awards ===
Locus Awards — for SF/F/H works, polled by readers of Locus Magazine (10 nominations)

- 2006: “The Fraud” (Asimov's Mar 2005) — novelette — 24th place
- 2006: “Last Man Standing” (F&SF Jan 2005) — novelette — 17th place
- 2006: “Helen Remembers the Stork Club” (F&SF Oct/Nov 2005) — short story — 15th place
- 2000: “How to Make Unicorn Pie” (F&SF Jan 1999) — novelette — 14th place
- 1999: “Brown Dust” (Starlight 2) — novelette — 16th place
- 1996: “A Birthday” (F&SF Aug 1995) — short story — 4th place
- 1996: Chicks in Chainmail (Baen) — anthology — 19th place
- 1993: “All Vows” (Asimov's Nov 1992) — short story — 17th place
- 1989: Druid's Blood (NAL Signet) — fantasy novel — 13th place
- 1987: New York by Knight (Signet) — fantasy novel — 19th place

=== Other Awards and Nominations ===
- James Tiptree Jr Memorial Award — for SF/F that explores and expands the roles of women and men, juried (1 nomination)
  - 1999: “In the Realms of Dragons” (Asimov's Feb 1998) — long list
- Asimov's Reader Poll — for stories, poems, and art published by Asimov's, polled by readers (4 nominations)
  - 2001: “The Shunned Trailer” (Asimov's Feb 2000) — short story — 10th place
  - 1995: “Death and the Librarian” (Asimov's Dec 1994) — short story — 2nd place
  - 1994: “'White!' Said Fred” (Asimov's Oct 1993) — short story — 3rd place (tie)
  - 1993: “All Vows” (Asimov's Nov 1992) — short story — 2nd place
- ·Gaylactic Spectrum Awards — for SF/F/H on GLBT themes, voted by members of Gaylactic Network (1 nomination)
  - 2000: “Chanoyu” (Asimov's Mar 1999) — short fiction — nomination
- HOMer Awards — for SF/F works, voted by members of SF/F forum on CompuServe (2 nominations)
  - 2000: “Chanoyu” (Asimov's Mar 1999) — novelette — nomination
  - 2000: “How to Make Unicorn Pie” (F&SF Jan 1999) — novelette — nomination

== Bibliography ==
=== Novels ===
- Harlot's Ruse (1986)
- The Silver Mountain (1986)
- Druid's Blood (1988)
- Yesterday We Saw Mermaids (1992)
- Split Heirs (1993) with Lawrence Watt-Evans
- Wishing Season (1993)
- The Sherwood Game (1995)
- Child of the Eagle: A Myth of Rome (1996)
- Playing with Fire (1997)
- Knock on Wood (2000)
- E.Godz (2003) with Robert Asprin
- Temping Fate (2006)
- Threads and Flames (2010)

Becca of Wiserways (Psalms) series

1. The Psalms Of Herod (1996)
2. The Sword Of Mary (1996)

Chronicles of the Twelve Kingdoms series

1. Mustapha and His Wise Dog (1985)
2. Spells of Mortal Weaving (1986)
3. The Witchwood Cradle (1987)
4. The Water King's Laughter (1989)

Demons series

1. Here Be Demons (1988)
2. Demon Blues (1989)
3. Hooray For Hellywood (1990)

Gnome Man's Land series

1. Gnome Man's Land (1991)
2. Harpy High (1991)
3. Unicorn U (1992)

Majyk series

1. Majyk by Accident (1993)
2. Majyk by Hook Or Crook (1994)
3. Majyk by Design (1995)

Men in Black novelizations

- Men in Black II (2002)

New York by Knight series

1. New York by Knight (1986)
2. Elf Defense (1988)
3. Sphynxes Wild (1989)

Princesses of Myth series

Helen of Troy

1. Nobody's Princess (2007)
2. Nobody's Prize (2008)

Nefertiti

1. Sphinx's Princess (2009)
2. Sphinx's Queen (2010)

Himiko

1. Spirit's Princess (2012)
2. Spirit's Chosen (2013)

Maeve

1. Deception's Princess (2014)
2. Deception's Pawn (2015)

Sabrina the Teenage Witch

- #11 Prisoner of Cabin 13
- #22 Witchopoly (1999)

Star Trek universe

- Warchild (1994), #7 in Star Trek: Deep Space Nine series
- To Storm Heaven (1997) #46 in Star Trek: The Next Generation numbered series

=== Short fiction ===
Collections

- It's Been Fun (1991)
- Up The Wall & Other Tales of King Arthur and His Knights (2000)
- Death and the Librarian and Other Stories (2002)

Series

- Cthulhu Mythos series:
  - "Love's Eldritch Ichor" (1990)
- Riverworld series:
  - "Legends" (1993)
- Zoli of the Brazen Shield series:
1. "Cross CHILDREN Walk" (1999) aka "Cross Children Walk"
2. "Troll by Jury" (2000)

Stories

Title	Year	Notes
The godsman and the goblin	2000	Friesner, Esther M. (December 2000). "The godsman and the goblin". F&SF. 99 (6): 135–158., Novelette
The stuff of heroes	1982	
Warts and all	2001	Friesner, Esther M. (March 2001). "Warts and all". F&SF. 100 (3): 132–160., Novelette
Write When You Get Work	1983	
Godgifu and Aelfgifu	1983	
Simpson's Lesser Sphynx	1984	
But Wait! There's More!	1984	with Walter J. Stutzman
The Jester's Tale	1985	
Primary	1985	
The Death of Nimuë	1985	
The Monk's Tale	1985	
A Friendly Game of Crola	1985	
The Sailor's Bride	1985	
Billingsgate Molly	1985	
Dragonet	1986	
Taverna	1986	
The Old Club Tie	1986	
The Apothecary's Tale	1986	
Honeycomb	1987	
A Winter's Night	1988	
A New Chantey	1988	
An Eye for the Ladies	1988	
Wake-Up Call	1988	
Black Butterflies	1989	
The Houri's Mirror	1989	
Do I Dare to Ask Your Name?	1989	
The Doo-Wop Never Dies: A Christmas Fable	1989	
Poe White Trash	1989	
Articles of Faith	1990	
The Weavers	1990	
In the Can	1990	
Sweet, Savage Sorcerer	1990	
Up the Wall	1990	
The Curse of Psamlahkithotep	1990	
Saint Willibald's Dragon	1990	
Whammy	1990	
A Matter of Taste	1990	
Blunderbore	1990	
Mad at the Academy	1991	
Ecce Hominid	1991	
The Shoemaker and the Elves	1991	
The Whiskaway Children and the Big Bang	1991	
Tunnel Vision	1991	
Claim-Jumpin' Woman, You Got A Stake in My Heart	1991	
Pride and Prescience	1991	
A Little Learning	1991	
Told You So	1992	collected in Mike Resnick's alternate history anthology Alternate Kennedys
Such a Deal	1992	
Take Me Out to the Ball Game	1992	
Her American Cousin	1992	
Split Heirs (Excerpt)	1992	with Lawrence Watt-Evans
Dead Ringer	1992	with Walter J. Stutzman
All Vows	1992	
Puss	1993	
The Blood-Ghoul of Scarsdale	1993	
You Can't Make an Omelet	1993	
Jane's Fighting Ships	1993	collected in Mike Resnick's anthology Alternate Warriors
Five-Finger Exercise	1993	
Three Queens	1993	
Sugar Daddy	1993	
Baby Face	1993	
Lowlifes	1993	
One Quiet Day in the Suburbs	1993	
'White!' Said Fred	1993	
The Broad in the Bronze Bra	1993	
Titus!	1994	
Royal Tiff Yields Face of Jesus!	1994	
Bargaining Chip	1994	
It's a Gift	1994	
Two Lovers, Two Gods, and a Fable	1994	
Jesus at the Bat	1994	
A Beltaine and Suspenders	1994	
Patterns	1994	
Death and the Librarian	1994	
In the Garden	1994	
Le Roi S'amuse	1995	
Goldie, Lox, and the Three Excalibearers	1995	
Chance	1995	
Down by the Old Mainstream	1995	
Un tour de cochon	1995	
A Pig's Tale	1995	
A Few Good Menehune	1995	
A Birthday	1995	
The Way to a Man's Heart	1995	
Tea	1996	
And Thereby Hangs	1996	
A Life in the Theatre	1996	
Sparrow	1996	
The Strange Case of Ludwig the Unspeakable	1996	
Moonlight in Vermont	1996	
Death Swatch	1996	
That's Entertainment: The Tale of Salacious Crumb	1996	
Just Wait Until You Have Children of Your Own	1996	
Silent Love	1997	
Lonelyhearts	1997	
King of the Cyber Trifles	1997	
Prey	1997	
Miss Thing	1997	
What Really Killed the Dinosaurs	1997	
No Bigger Than My Thumb	1997	
Give a Man a Horse He Can Ride	1997	
True Believer	1997	
Claim-Jumpin' Woman Got a Stake in My Heart	1997	
Won't You Take Me Dancing?	1997	
Mortal Things	1997	
To Storm Heaven (Excerpt)	1997	
A Big Hand for the Little Lady	1998	
The Littlest Maenad	1998	
Mrs. Lurie and the Rapture	1998	
How It All Began	1998	
Twelve-Steppe Program	1998	
A Hamster of No Importance	1998	with Walter J. Stutzman
Brown Dust	1998	
Ivy	1998	
In the Realm of Dragons	1998	
Totally Camelot	1998	
Chestnut Street	1998	
An Old Man's Summer	1998	collected in Harry Turtledove's anthology Alternate Generals
Repro Man	1999	with Anne Elizabeth Stutzman
Love, Crystal and Stone	1999	
Fashion Victim	1999	
How to Make Unicorn Pie	1999	
Jolene's Motel	1999	
Chanoyu	1999	
Case #285B	1999	
Sea-Section	1999	
Miranda's Muse	2000	
Big Hair	2000	
Hallowmass	2000	
The Shunned Trailer	2000	
Cora	2000	
Gunsel and Gretel	2001	
Auntie Elspeth's Halloween Story, or the Gourd, the Bad and the Ugly	2001	
Werotica	2001	
Came the Dawn	2001	
Ilion	2002	
Labor Relations	2002	collected in Harry Turtledove's anthology Alternate Generals II
Men in the Rain	2002	
Grain	2002	
Just Another Cowboy	2002	
In Days of Old	2002	
Why I Want to Come to Brewer College	2002	
Homework	2002	
I Killed Them in Vegas	2003	
Giants in the Earth	2004	
Au Purr	2004	
The Dead Don't Waddle	2004	
Johnny Beansprout	2004	
Child's Play	2004	
Last Man Standing	2005	
Marriage a la Modred	2005	
The Fraud	2005	
Cook's Turing	2005	
The Beau and the Beast	2005	
First, Catch Your Elephant	2005	collected in Harry Turtledove's anthology Alternate Generals III
One for the Record	2005	
Helen Remembers The Stork Club	2005	
Thunderbolt	2005	
Abductio Ad Absurdum	2006	
The Really Big Sleep	2006	
An Autumn Butterfly	2006	
Benny Comes Home	2006	
Cubby Grumbles Makes a Change	2006	
Crumbs	2006	
The Wedding of Wylda Serene	2006	
If Looks Could Kill	2007	
Seeking the Master	2007	
A Sacred Institution	2007	
At These Prices	2007	
Roomies	2007	
The Bones of Mammoth Malone	2007	
Stocks and Bondage	2007	
Edra's Arrow	2007	
A Rosé for Emily	2007	
Home for the Holidays	2008	
In a Dark Wood, Dreaming	2008	
How Thorvald the Bloody-Minded Saved Christmas	2008	
The Face Is Familiar	2008	
You Got Served	2008	
Mummy Knows Best	2008	
Gut Feeling	2008	
Isn't That Special	2009	
No Children, No Pets	2010	
Long in the Tooth	2010	
The One That Got Away	2011	
Rutger and Baby Do Jotenheim	2011	
Dance with the Devil	2012	
Title	Year	Notes

=== Anthologies (edited) ===
Chicks in Chainmail series

1. Chicks in Chainmail (1995)
2. Did You Say Chicks?! (1998)
3. Chicks 'n Chained Males (1999)
4. The Chick is in the Mail (2000)
5. Turn the Other Chick (2004)
6. Chicks and Balances (2015)
- Chicks Ahoy! (2010) Omnibus of first three volumes

Supernatural Suburbia series

1. Witch Way to the Mall (2009)
2. Strip Mauled (2009)
3. Fangs for the Mammaries (2010)

Alien Pregnant By Elvis (1994 with Martin H. Greenberg)

Blood Muse (1995 with Martin H. Greenberg)

=== Poems ===
- "The Shield-Maiden's Honeymoon" (1984)
- "Chivalry" (1985)
- "A Gaming Son" (1985)
- "The Vampire of Gretna Green" (1985)
- "A Short Slew of SF Clerihews" (1986)
- "More SF Clerihews" (1986)
- "Yet More SF Clerihews" (1986)
- "The Sincere Symbiote" (1986)
- "Spell for a Nuclear Witch" (1988)
- "Who Made the Stew on Betelgeuse II?" (1988)
- "Cat-Tech-Ism" (1988)
- "Food for Thought" (1989)
- "Confessio" (1989)
- "The Hobbyist" (1989)
- "Lovers" (1994)
- "For Sale: One Moonbase, Never Used" (2009)

=== Essays ===
- Letter (Locus #307) (1986) with S. P. Somtow and Sharon Webb
- Letter (Science Fiction Chronicle #85) (1986) with S. P. Somtow and Sharon Webb
- Regrets Only (1986)
- The Other Side: Now Revealed: Money-Making Secrets of the Shockmeisters (1987)
- Letter (Locus #326) (1988)
- About the Authors (Arabesques) (1988) with M. J. Engh and William R. Forstchen and Tanith Lee and Sandra Miesel and Larry Niven and Andre Norton and Elizabeth Ann Scarborough and Melissa Scott and Susan Shwartz and Nancy Springer and Judith Tarr and Harry Turtledove and Gene Wolfe and Jane Yolen
- Letter (Locus #331) (1988)
- Read This (NYRSF, November 1988) (1988)
- Who Was That Alien I Saw You With Last Night? (1990)
- Introduction (It's Been Fun) (1991)
- Ask Auntie Esther (Pulphouse, October 25, 1991) (1991)
- Ask Auntie Esther (Pulphouse, November 29, 1991) (1991)
- Ask Auntie Esther (Pulphouse, December 31, 1991) (1991)
- Ask Auntie Esther (Pulphouse, July 1992) (1992)
- Ask Auntie Esther (Pulphouse, September–October 1992) (1992)
- Ask Auntie Esther (Pulphouse #15) (1993)
- Ask Auntie Esther (Pulphouse #17, 1994) (1994)
- Introduction: Alien Pregnant by Elvis (1994)
- Chicks in Chainmail (introduction) (1995)
- There's nothing funny about mixing humor and SF (1995)
- Introduction (Blood Muse) (1995)
- Take My Wizard...Please! The Serious Business of Writing Funny Fantasy and Science Fiction (1996)
- The Old School Spirit (1997)
- Introduction (Did You Say Chicks?) (1998)
- But What I Really Want to Do Is Direct (1998)
- Introduction (Chicks 'n Chained Males) (1999)
- Introduction (The Chick is in the Mail) (2000) only appeared as:
  - Variant: Introduction (The Chick Is in the Mail) (2000)
- If You Give a Girl a Hobbit (2001) also appeared as:
  - Translation: Wennein Mädel an einen Hobbit gerät [German] (2002)
  - Translation: Hobbits et jeune filles en fleur [French] (2003)
- Introduction (Death and the Librarian and Other Stories) (2002)
- Introduction to "The Stuff of Heroes" (2003)
- Terry Pratchett: The Man, The Myth, The Legend, The Beverage (2004)
- Give Beast a Chance (2005)
- About the Authors (Turn the Other Chick) (2006)
- Introduction (Turn the Other Chick) (2006)
- On "Helen Remembers the Stork Club" (2007)
- Introduction (Witch Way to the Mall) (2009)
- Leader of the Pack (2009)
- Introduction (Fangs for the Mammaries) (2010)
- On Judy and Darkover (2013)
- Introduction (Bard's Road: The Collected Fiction of Lee Martindale) (2014)
- Introduction (Chicks and Balances) (2015)
