= Robert Adams (science fiction writer) =

American science fiction and fantasy writer (1933–1990)

- Born: August 31, 1933; Danville, Virginia, U.S.
- Died: January 4, 1990 (aged 56); Apopka, Florida, U.S.
- Occupation: Author
- Writing career
- Genres: Science fiction, fantasy

Franklin Robert Adams (August 31, 1933 – January 4, 1990), who published as Robert Adams, was an American science fiction and fantasy writer. He is known best for his Horseclans books.

== Writings ==
Robert Adams is known primarily for his post-apocalyptic fiction. His first book, Coming of the Horseclans, published in 1975, was the first of his post-apocalyptic works, and began his Horseclans series. The series is notable for having a detailed world and labyrinthine timeline (many of his Horseclans books are so cross-referenced that they make sense only when read in sequential order). The Horseclans series became his best-known works. While he never completed the series, he wrote 18 novels in the Horseclans series before his death.

From 1979 to 1989, Adams published several books as part of the series Castaways in Time. They used some elements of the "Horseclans" novels (phonetic accents and themes of civilization versus barbarism). While not as popular as the Horseclans series, it has a readership for its unique premises.

Beginning in 1985, Adams published several anthologies which he co-edited with a number of editors including Martin H. Greenberg. He later began publishing The Stairway to Forever book series in 1988, but only was able to complete two books of the series before his death.

Adams' style includes violent, almost non-stop action, and meticulous detail for matters both historical and military. As some of his series progressed he sometimes digressed, expounding conservative and especially libertarian opinions.

Adams died in Apopka, Florida on January 4, 1990.

== Bibliography ==
=== Horseclans ===
1. The Coming of the Horseclans (1975)
2. Swords of the Horseclans (1976)
3. Revenge of the Horseclans (1977)
4. A Cat of Silvery Hue (1979)
5. The Savage Mountains (1979)
6. The Patrimony (1980)
7. Horseclans Odyssey (1981)
8. The Death of a Legend (1981)
9. The Witch Goddess (1982)
10. Bili the Axe (1982)
11. Champion of the Last Battle (1983)
12. A Woman of the Horseclans (1983)
13. Horses of the North (1985)
14. A Man Called Milo Morai (1986)
15. The Memories of Milo Morai (1986)
16. Trumpets of War (1987)
17. Madman's Army (1987)
18. The Clan of the Cats (1988)
- Friends of the Horseclans (1987; anthology), ed. (with Pamela Crippen-Adams)
- Friends of the Horseclans II (1989; anthology), ed. (with Pamela Crippen-Adams)

=== Castaways in Time ===
1. Castaways in Time (1980)
2. The Seven Magical Jewels of Ireland (1984)
3. Of Quests and Kings (1986)
4. Of Chiefs and Champions (1987)
5. Of Myths and Monsters (1988)
6. Of Beginnings and Endings (1989)

=== Stairway to Forever ===
1. The Stairway to Forever (1988)
2. Monsters and Magicians (1988)
3. Guideposts to Danger (planned title, never written)

=== Anthologies edited ===
==== Magic in Ithkar (with Andre Norton) ====
1. Magic in Ithkar (1985)
2. Magic in Ithkar 2 (1985)
3. Magic in Ithkar 3 (1987)
4. Magic in Ithkar 4 (1987)

==== Other ====
- Barbarians (1986), ed. (with Martin H. Greenberg and Charles G. Waugh)
- Barbarians II (1987), ed. (with Pamela Crippen-Adams and Martin H. Greenberg)
- Robert Adams' Book of Alternate Worlds (1987), ed. (with Pamela Crippen-Adams and Martin H. Greenberg)
- Hunger for Horror (1988), ed. (with Pamela Crippen-Adams and Martin H. Greenberg)
- Robert Adams' Book of Soldiers (1988) (with Pamela Crippen-Adams and Martin H. Greenberg)
- Alternatives (1989) (with Pamela Crippen-Adams)
- Phantom Regiments (1990), ed. (with Pamela Crippen-Adams and Martin H. Greenberg)

== General sources ==
- New General Catalog of Old Books and Authors;
