= Mildred Downey Broxon =

American speculative fiction writer

Mildred Downey Broxon (born June 7, 1944 in Atlanta, Georgia) is an American science fiction and fantasy author.

== Life ==
Broxon was born in Atlanta and grew up in Brazil. She studied psychology and worked as an assistant teacher for the mentally handicapped and as a nurse in the psychiatric department of a hospital. In 1972 she was a participant in the Clarion Workshop for budding SF and fantasy authors and in 1973 she published her first short story "Asclepius Has Paws" in the Clarion III anthology (edited by Robin Scott Wilson).

Her first novel, Eric Brighteyes #2: A Witch's Welcome, published in 1979 under the pseudonym Sigfriour Skaldaspillir, is usually described as a sequel to H. Rider Haggard's novel Eric Brighteyes, based on Old Icelandic tales; in fact, it is a narrative of the same plot as Haggard's novel, but written from the point of view of the sorceress Swanhild, the opponent of Haggard's hero Eric, who no longer appears as a wicked witch, but as a woman with understandable motives and goals.

Her second novel, The Demon of Scattery (1979), was written in collaboration with the well-known SF author Poul Anderson. In it, a dragon is called to help to protect Ireland from an incursion of the Vikings.

In her third novel, Too Long a Sacrifice (1981), the bard Tadgh MacNiall and his wife, the healer Maire ni Donnall, a 6th-century Irish couple, have passed the centuries in the Sidhe world and are now living in Ireland in the 1970s, in a world characterized by conflict between Catholics and Protestants. The two protagonists are at the same time incarnations of Celtic deities who, like the Irish of the present, are engaged in a never-ending quarrel with each other. The novel was received very positively by authors like Anne McCaffrey, Poul Anderson and Joan D. Vinge.

In the years 1973-1989, Broxon wrote three additional novels and about 20 short stories. Many were translated into German and other languages.

== Works ==
Novels

- as Sigfriour Skaldaspillir: Eric Brighteyes #2: A Witch's Welcome (1979)
- with Poul Anderson: The Demon of Scattery (1979)
- Too Long a Sacrifice (1981)

Short stories

- "Asclepius Has Paws" (1973)
- "The Stones Have Names" (1974)
- "Grow in Wisdom" (1974)
- "The Night Is Cold, the Stars Are Far Away" (1974)
- "Source Material" (1974)
- "Dear Universal Gourmet" (1975)
- "Glass Beads" (1975)
- "To the Waters and the Wild" (1975)
- "The Antrim Hills" (1976)
- "The Book of Padraig" (1977)
- "Singularity" (1978)
- "Where Is Next Door?" (1978)
- "In Time, Everything" (1978)
- with Poul Anderson: "Strength" (in the collection The Magic May Return, 1981)
- "Walk the Ice" (1981)
- "Sea Changeling" (1981)
- "Night of the Fifth Sun" (1982)
- "Flux of Fortune" (1985)
- "Storyknife" (1986)
- "First Do No Harm" (1987)
- "The Danaan Children Laugh" (unpublished)
