= Steven Piziks =

American author of science fiction

Steven Harper Piziks is an American author of science fiction.

Piziks writes mostly science fiction, fantasy, steampunk, and film and television series novelizations. He has also written science fiction books with LGBT themes under his pseudonym, Steven Harper, and has been nominated for the Gaylactic Spectrum Award for his novels four times without winning, a record. He is also a member of the Book View Café writers co-op.

== Biography ==
Piziks was born in Saginaw, Michigan, and grew up in the small town of Wheeler, Michigan. At twelve years of age, he moved to the outskirts of Midland, Michigan, then later to Saginaw, where he graduated from high school. He went to Central Michigan University, where he earned two bachelor's degrees: one in German/speech and one in English/health education, and to Seton Hill University, where he earned a master's degree in English. He currently writes science fiction and fantasy novels under two names and lives in Michigan with his husband, where he teaches English.

== Awards ==
- Dreamer (Roc, 2001) - Gaylactic Spectrum Award nominee ISBN 0-451-45843-5
- Nightmare: A Novel of the Silent Empire (Roc, 2002) - Gaylactic Spectrum Award nominee ISBN 0-451-45898-2
- Trickster'' (Roc, 2003) - Gaylactic Spectrum Award nominee ISBN 0-451-45941-5
- Offspring - Gaylactic Spectrum Award nominee ISBN 0-451-46001-4

== Bibliography ==
=== As Steven Harper ===
- Unity (a Battlestar Galactica novel) ISBN 0-7653-1608-0
- Dead Man on the Moon ISBN 0-9770708-2-4
- Dreamer: A Novel of the Silent Empire (Roc, 2001) ISBN 0-451-45843-5
- Nightmare: A Novel of the Silent Empire (Roc, 2002) ISBN 0-451-45898-2
- Trickster: A Novel of the Silent Empire (Roc, 2003) ISBN 0-451-45941-5
- Offspring: A Novel of the Silent Empire (Roc, 2004) ISBN 0-451-46001-4
- Writing the Paranormal Novel (Writers Digest Books, 2011) ISBN 1-59963-134-2
- The Doomsday Vault: A Novel of the Clockwork Empire (Roc, 2011) ISBN 0-451-46429-X
- The Impossible Cube: A Novel of the Clockwork Empire (Roc, 2012) ISBN 0-451-46450-8
- The Dragon Men: A Novel of the Clockwork Empire (Roc, 2012) ISBN 0-451-46488-5
- The Havoc Machine: A Novel of the Clockwork Empire (Roc, 2013) ISBN 0-451-41704-6
- Iron Axe: A Novel of the Books of Blood and Iron (Roc, 2015) ISBN 0-451-46846-5
- Blood Storm: A Novel of the Books of Blood and Iron (Roc, 2015) ISBN 0-451-46847-3
- Bone War: A Novel of the Books of Blood and Iron (Roc, 2016) ISBN 0-451-46848-1

=== As Steven Piziks ===
- In the Company of Mind (Baen, 1996)
- Corporate Mentality (Baen, 1999)
- The Nanotech War (Pocket books, 2002) - A Star Trek novel.
- Identity (2003) - Novelisation
- The Exorcist: the Beginning (Pocket books) - Novelisation
- The Plague Room (Pocket books, 2003) - A Ghost Whisperer novel.

=== As Penny Drake ===
- Trash Course (Carina Press, 2010) ISBN 978-1-4268-9066-6

== See also ==
- Gaylactic Spectrum Award for Best Novel
