= Laura Frankos =

American novelist (born 1960)

Laura Frankos-Turtledove
- Born: February 9, 1960 (age 66)
- Occupation: Author
- Spouse: Harry Turtledove
- Children: 3
- Relatives: Steven Frankos (brother)

Laura Frankos-Turtledove is an American author born February 9, 1960. She writes as Laura Frankos.

== Biography ==
Frankos is married to the science fiction author Harry Turtledove and has three daughters: Alison, Rachel, and Rebecca. Her brother is fantasy author Steven Frankos.

== Literary career ==
Frankos has written mysteries, fantasy and science fiction stories. She has published one mystery novel, Saint Oswald's Niche, which is currently out of print, a time travel novel, Broadway Revival, and The Broadway Musical Quiz Book. Frankos also writes the Broadway history column "The Great White Wayback Machine" and has published numerous trivia quizzes about Broadway plays.

== Bibliography ==
=== Novels ===
- St. Oswald's Niche (1992)
- Broadway Revival (2021)

=== Non-fiction ===
- The Broadway Musical Quiz Book (2010)

=== Short stories ===
- "Hoofer" (1993)
- "A Beak for Trends" (1994)
- "The Njuggle" (1995)
- "The Old Grind" (1995) (published on-line here)
- "Slue-Foot Sue and the Witch in the Woods" (1998)
- "Leg Irons, the Bitch and the Wardrobe" (1999)
- "The Great White Way" (2000)
- "Merchants of Discord" (2000)
- "A Late Symmer Night's Battle" (2004) (published on-line here)
- "The Sea Mother's Gift" (2004)
- "Natural Selection" (2005)
- "The Garden Gnome Freedom Front" (2005)
- "One Touch of Hippolyta" (2015)
