= List of genres =

This is a list of genres of literature and entertainment (film, television, music, and video games), excluding genres in the visual arts.

Genre is the term for any category of creative work, which includes literature and other forms of art or entertainment (e.g. music)—whether written or spoken, audio or visual—based on some set of stylistic criteria. Genres are formed by conventions that change over time as new genres are invented and the use of old ones are discontinued. Often, works fit into multiple genres by way of borrowing and recombining these conventions.

== Literary genres ==
=== Action ===
An action story is similar to adventure, and the protagonist usually takes a risky turn, which leads to desperate situations (including explosions, fight scenes, daring escapes, etc.). Action and adventure are usually categorized together (sometimes even as "action-adventure") because they have much in common, and many stories fall under both genres simultaneously (for instance, the James Bond series can be classified as both).

- Military fiction: A story about a war or battle that can either be historical or fictional. It usually follows the events a certain warrior goes through during the battle's events.
- Spy fiction: A story about a secret agent (spy) or military personnel member who is sent on an espionage mission. Usually, they are equipped with special gadgets that prove useful during the mission, and they have special training in things such as unarmed combat or computer hacking. They may or may not work for a specific government.

=== Adventure ===
An adventure story is about a protagonist who journeys to epic or distant places to accomplish something. It can have many other genre elements included within it, because it is a very open genre. The protagonist has a mission and faces obstacles to get to their destination. Also, adventure stories usually include unknown settings and characters with prized properties or features.

- Superhero fiction: a story that examines the adventures of costumed crime fighters known as superheroes, who often possess superhuman powers and battle similarly powered criminals, known as supervillains.
- Swashbuckler
- Ruritanian romance: a genre of swashbuckling adventure novels, set in a fictional country, usually in Central Europe or Eastern Europe
- Picaresque: a genre featuring a roguish protagonist in a series of loosely connected adventures using his wits to get by in a corrupt society.

=== Comedy ===
Comedy is a story intended to amuse the audience. It is a very open genre, and thus crosses over with many other genres on a frequent basis.

- Comedy of manners: A work that satirizes the manners and affectations of a social class, often represented by stock characters. The plot of the comedy is often concerned with an illicit love affair or some other scandal, but is generally less important than its witty dialogue. This form of comedy has a long ancestry, dating back at least as far as Shakespeare's Much Ado about Nothing.
- Comic fantasy: A subgenre of fantasy that is primarily humorous in intent and tone. Usually set in imaginary worlds, comic fantasy often includes puns on and parodies of other works of fantasy. It is sometimes known as low fantasy in contrast to high fantasy, which is primarily serious in intent and tone. The term "low fantasy" is also used to represent other types of fantasy, so while comic fantasies may also correctly be classified as low fantasy, many examples of low fantasy are not comic in nature.
- Dark comedy: A comedic story that is based on normally tragic or taboo subjects, including death, murder, suicide, illicit drugs, and war.
- Science fiction comedy: A comedy that uses science fiction elements or settings, often as a lighthearted (or occasionally vicious) parody of the latter genre.
- Satire: Often strictly defined as a literary genre or form, though in practice it is also found in the graphic and performing arts. In satire, human or individual vices, follies, abuses, or shortcomings are held up to censure by means of ridicule, derision, burlesque, irony, or other methods, ideally with the intent to bring about improvement. Satire is usually meant to be funny, but its purpose is not primarily humor as an attack on something the author disapproves of, using wit. A common, almost defining feature of satire is its strong vein of irony or sarcasm, but parody, burlesque, exaggeration, juxtaposition, comparison, analogy, and double entendre all frequently appear in satirical speech and writing. The essential point, is that "in satire, irony is militant;" this "militant irony" (i.e., sarcasm) often professes to approve (or at least accept as natural) the very things the satirist actually wishes to attack.
- Absurdist and surrealist: closely related/overlapping genres that challenge casual and rudimentary reasoning and even the most basic purposefulness found within life. There is often, though not always, a connection to comedy.
  - The absurdist genre focuses on the experiences of characters in situations where they cannot find any inherent purpose in life, most often represented by ultimately meaningless actions and events that call into question the certainty of existential concepts such as truth or value. Elements common to this genre include satire, dark humor, incongruity, the abasement of reason, and controversy regarding the philosophical condition of being "nothing".
  - The surreal genre is predicated on deliberate violations of causality, producing events and behaviours that are obviously illogical. Constructions of surreal humour tend to involve bizarre juxtapositions, non-sequiturs, irrational, or absurd situations and expressions of nonsense.

=== Crime and mystery ===
A crime story is often about a crime that is being committed or was committed, but can also be an account of a criminal's life. A mystery story follows an investigator as they attempt to solve a puzzle (often a crime). The details and clues are presented as the story continues and the protagonist discovers them and by the end of the story the mystery is solved. For example, in the case of a crime mystery, the perpetrator and motive behind the crime are revealed and the perpetrator is brought to justice. But in some circumstances, the person who has committed the crime or committed a crime before will not always be brought to justice it may end unsolved. Mystery novels are often written in series, which facilitates a more in-depth development of the primary investigator.

- Cozy mysteries
- Detective story: A story about a detective or person, either professional or amateur, who has to solve a crime that was committed. They must figure out who committed the crime and why. Sometimes, the detective must figure out 'how' the criminal committed the crime if it seems impossible.
  - Whodunit: This is a complex, plot-driven variety of the detective story in which the audience is given the opportunity to engage in the same process of deduction as the protagonist throughout the investigation of a crime. The reader or viewer is provided with the clues from which the identity of the perpetrator may be deduced before the story provides the revelation itself at its climax. The investigation is usually conducted by an eccentric amateur or semi-professional detective.
- Gentleman thief: Centers around particularly well-behaving and apparently well-bred thieves. They rarely bother with anonymity or force, preferring to rely on their charisma, physical attractiveness, and clever misdirection to steal the most unobtainable objects – sometimes for their own support, but mostly for the thrill of the act itself.
- Gong'an fiction: A subgenre of historical crime fiction that involves government magistrates who solve criminal cases.
- Legal thriller: This subgenre of thriller and crime fiction presents stories in which the major characters are lawyers, judges, and/or their employees. Examples include Primal Fear (1993) and Blood Defense (2016).
- Locked-room mysteries
- Murder mystery: A mystery story that focuses on homicides. Usually, the detective must figure out who killed one or several victims. They may or may not find themselves or loved ones in danger because of this investigation. The genre often includes elements of the suspense story genre, or of the action and adventure genres.
- Noir fiction
  - Hardboiled: This is a literary genre sharing the setting with crime fiction (especially detective stories). Though deriving from the romantic tradition—which emphasized the emotions of apprehension, horror and terror, and awe—hardboiled fiction deviates from the tradition in the detective's cynical attitude towards those emotions. The attitude is conveyed through the detective's self-talk describing to the reader what he is doing and feeling.

=== Fantasy ===
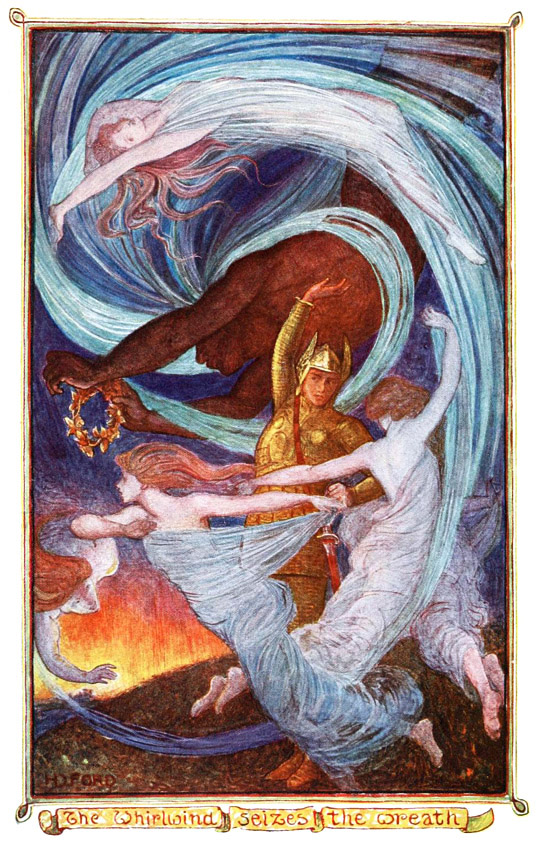
The Whirlwind Seizes the Wreath (from The Fairy Aurora)

A fantasy story is about magic or supernatural forces, as opposed to technology as seen in science fiction. Depending on the extent of these other elements, the story may or may not be considered to be a "hybrid genre" series; for instance, even though the Harry Potter series canon includes the requirement of a particular gene to be a wizard, it is referred to only as a fantasy series.

- Accidental travel, a genre in which protagonists accidentally find themselves outside of their normal place or time, often for no apparent reason, a particular type of the “fish-out-of-water” plot; an umbrella term for accidental time travel, portal fantasy, isekai, alien abduction fantasy, and the likes.
- Bangsian: A fantasy subgenre that concerns the use of famous literary or historical individuals and their interactions in the afterlife. It is named for John Kendrick Bangs, who often wrote in this genre.
- Contemporary fantasy (aka modern fantasy or indigenous fantasy): A subgenre of fantasy, set in the present day. These are used to describe stories set in the putative real world (often referred to as consensus reality) in contemporary times, in which magic and magical creatures exist, either living in the interstices of our world or leaking over from alternate worlds.
  - Urban fantasy: A subgenre of fantasy defined by place; the fantastic narrative has an urban setting. Many urban fantasies are set in contemporary times and contain supernatural elements. However, the stories can take place in historical, modern, or futuristic periods, as well as fictional settings. The prerequisite is that they must be primarily set in a city.
- Dark fantasy: A subgenre of fantasy that can refer to literary, artistic, and filmic works that combine fantasy with elements of horror. The term can be used broadly to refer to fantastical works that have a dark, gloomy atmosphere or a sense of horror and dread and a dark, often brooding, tone.
- Fables: A type of narration demonstrating a useful truth. Animals speak as humans, legendary, supernatural tale.
- Fairy tales: A folk genre about various magical creatures, environments, et cetera. Many fairy tales are generally targeted for children.
- Hard fantasy: Fantasy where the world and its magical elements are constructed in a logical and rational manner.
- Epic/High fantasy: Mythical stories with highly developed characters and story lines. Examples include Malazan Book of the Fallen and The Lord of the Rings.
- Heroic fantasy: Subgenre of fantasy that chronicles the tales of heroes in imaginary lands. Frequently, the protagonist is reluctant to be a champion, is of low or humble origin, and has royal ancestors or parents but does not know it. Though events are usually beyond their control, they are thrust into positions of great responsibility where their mettle is tested in a number of spiritual and physical challenges.
- Historical fantasy: A category of fantasy and genre of historical fiction that incorporates fantastic elements (such as magic) into the historical narrative.
- Legends: Stories, oftentimes of a national hero or other folk figure, which have a basis in fact, but also contain imaginative material.
- Literary fairy tale, a literary counterpart of fairy tales
- LitRPG: A world that resembles a table-top or computer RPG, usually with ranks or levels in universe.
- Magical girl: Popular in Japan, this subgenre is of girls who use magic in either their training, idol stardom, or even to fight evil.
- Magic realism (aka magical realism): literary works where magical events form part of ordinary life. The reader is forced to accept that abnormal events such as levitation, telekinesis and talking with the dead take place in the real world. The writer does not invent a new world or describe in great detail new creatures, as is usual in Fantasy; on the contrary, the author abstains from explaining the fantastic events to avoid making them feel extraordinary. It is often regarded as a genre exclusive to Latin American literature, but some of its chief exponents include English authors. One Hundred Years of Solitude, by Gabriel García Márquez, who received the 1982 Nobel Prize in Literature, is considered the genre's seminal work of style.
- Mythic fiction: Literature that is rooted in, inspired by, or that in some way draws from the tropes, themes and symbolism of myth, folklore, and fairy tales. The term is widely credited to Charles de Lint and Terri Windling. Mythic fiction overlaps with urban fantasy and the terms are sometimes used interchangeably, but mythic fiction also includes contemporary works in non-urban settings. Mythic fiction refers to works of contemporary literature that often cross the divide between literary and fantasy fiction.
- Portal fantasy: In portal fantasy, a character travels to the fantastical world from another, usually less-fantastical one.
  - Isekai: A Japanese form of portal fantasy which can typically—though not always—also follow many of the conventions of the LitRPG (such as a character entering into the world of a game).
- Progression fantasy: A genre focused on characters training to become more powerful in martial ability or other skills.
- Science fantasy: A story with mystical elements that are scientifically explainable, or that combine science fiction elements with fantasy elements. (Science fiction was once referred to by this name, but that it no longer denotes that genre, and has somewhat fallen out of favor as a genre descriptor.)
  - Sword and planet: A subgenre of science fantasy that features rousing adventure stories set on other planets, and usually featuring Earthmen as protagonists. There is a fair amount of overlap between "sword and planet" and the "planetary romance" subgenre of sci-fi, though some works are considered to belong to one and not the other. In general, the latter is considered to be more of a "space opera" subgenre, influenced by the likes of A Princess of Mars yet more modern and technologically savvy, while "sword and planet" more directly imitates the conventions established by Burroughs in the Barsoom series.
  - Dying Earth: A subgenre of science fantasy that takes place either at the end of life on Earth or the end of time, when the laws of the universe themselves fail. More generally, the Dying Earth subgenre encompasses science fiction works set in the far distant future in a milieu of stasis or decline. Themes that tend to predominate this genre include those of world-weariness, innocence (wounded or otherwise), idealism, entropy, (permanent) exhaustion/depletion of many or all resources (such as soil nutrients), and the hope of renewal.
  - Gaslamp fantasy: Fantasy's counterpart to steampunk, in which the settings are often Victorian or Edwardian socially or technologically, but with non-scientific elements or characters included.
- Shenmo: A genre of fantasy that revolves around the gods and monsters of Chinese mythology.
- Sword and sorcery: A blend of heroic fantasy, adventure, and frequent elements of the horrific in which a mighty barbaric warrior hero is pitted against both human and supernatural adversaries. Robert E. Howard, creator of Conan the Cimmerian, Kull of Atlantis, the Pictish king Bran Mak Morn, et cetera, is generally acknowledged as the founder of the genre, chiefly through his writings for Weird Tales and other 1920s/30s pulp magazines.

=== Historical ===
A story about a real person or event. There are also some fiction works that purport to be the "memoirs" of fictional characters as well, done in a similar style, however, these are in a separate genre. Often, they are written in a text book format, which may or may not focus on solely that.

- Biography: The details of the life story of a real person, told by someone else.
  - Autobiography: Essentially the same as a biography, with the exception that the story is written by the person who is the subject of the story.
  - Memoir: Similar to autobiography, with the exception that it is told more "from memory", i.e. it is how the person personally remembers and feels about their life or a stage in their life, more than the exact, recorded details of that period. Though memoirs are often more subjective than autobiography works, memoirs are generally still considered to be nonfiction works.

==== Historical fiction ====
The historical fiction genre includes stories that are about the past. It takes place in the real world, with real world people, but with several fictionalized or dramatized elements. To distinguish historical fiction from any fiction that is written about an era in the past, the criterion is that the book must have been written about a time that occurred in a historical context in relation to the author of the book. The criterion that the story be set before the middle of the previous century is sometimes added. Historical fiction stories include historical details and includes characters that fit into the time period of the setting, whether or not they are real historical people. This may or may not crossover with other genres; for example, fantasy fiction or science fiction may play a part, as is the case for instance with the novel George Washington's Socks, which includes time travel elements.

- Alternate history: A more extreme variant of historical fiction that posits a "what if" scenario in which some historical event occurs differently (or not at all), thus altering the course of history; for instance, "What if Nazi Germany had won World War II?" is an alternate history concept that has had treatment in fiction, such as in The Man in the High Castle (1962). Alternate History is sometimes (though not universally) referred to as a subgenre of science fiction or speculative fiction, and like historical fiction, may include more fantastical elements (e.g., the Temeraire series uses the fantasy element of dragons to create an Alternate History plot set during the Napoleonic Era).
  - Counterfactual history (aka virtual history): This is a recent form of historiography that attempts to answer counterfactual "what if" questions. It seeks to explore history and historical incidents by means of extrapolating a timeline in which certain key historical events did not happen or had a different outcome. This exercise ascertains the relative importance of the event, incident or person the counter-factual hypothesis negates.
- Period piece: This type features historical places, people, or events that may or not be crucial to the story. Because history is merely used as a backdrop, it may be fictionalized to various degrees, but the story itself may be regarded as "outside" history. Genres within this category are often regarded as significant categories in themselves.
  - Jidaigeki: A story usually set in the Edo period of Japanese history, from 1603 to 1868.

=== Horror ===
A horror story is told to deliberately scare or frighten the audience, through suspense, violence or shock. H. P. Lovecraft distinguishes two primary varieties in the "Introduction" to Supernatural Horror in Literature: 1) Physical Fear or the "mundanely gruesome;" and 2) the true Supernatural Horror story or the "Weird Tale". The supernatural variety is occasionally called "dark fantasy", since the laws of nature must be violated in some way, thus qualifying the story as "fantastic".

- Ghost story: A story about the intrusion of the spirits of the dead into the realm of the living. There are subgenres: The Traditional Haunting, Poltergeists, The Haunted Place or Object (i.e. the hotel in Stephen King's The Shining), or the etching in "The Mezzotint" by M. R. James, etc. Some would include stories of Revenants such as "The Monkey's Paw" by W. W. Jacobs.
- Gothic fiction: An atmospheric supernatural tale centered on a fear of the taboo and unknown. Lurid secrets and personal tragedies are common in stories in which the past returns to haunt the present, thematically reflected in the genre's crumbling, decayed architecture. The Castle of Otranto (1764) by Horace Walpole exemplifies the heightened emotion and foreboding tone of the genre.
- Monster: A story about a monster, creature, or mutant that terrorizes people. Mary Shelley's novel Frankenstein is an example of a story with a monstrous "creature" (Frankenstein is often also considered the first science fiction story, in that it depicts biological science reanimating the dead). Other clear Monster stories are of the creatures of folklore and fable: the Ghoul, the Werewolf, and the Zombie.
  - Vampire literature: A story about vampires, reanimated bodies that feed on the blood of the living, based on European folklore. Bram Stoker's Dracula (1897) created many of the genre's conventions.
- Jiangshi fiction: Stories about jiangshi, the hopping corpses under the control of Taoist priests derived from Chinese literature and folklore.
- Occult stories: Stories that touch upon the adversaries of Good, especially the "Enemies" of the forces of righteousness as expressed in any given religious philosophy. Hence, stories of devils, demons, demonic possession, dark witchcraft, evil sorcerers or warlocks, and figures like the Antichrist would qualify. The nature of such stories presupposes the existence of the side of Good and the existence of a deity to be opposed to the forces of Evil.
- Survival horror: A horror story about a protagonist in a risky and life-threatening situation that they must endure, often as a result of things such as zombies or other monsters, and the rest of the plot is how the main characters overcome this.

=== Romance ===
The term romance has multiple meanings; for example, historical romances like those of Walter Scott would use the term to mean "a fictitious narrative in prose or verse; the interest of which turns upon marvellous and uncommon incidents".

Most often, however, a romance is understood to be "love stories", emotion-driven stories that are primarily focused on the relationship between the main characters of the story. Beyond the focus on the relationship, the biggest defining characteristic of the romance genre is that a happy ending is always guaranteed, perhaps marriage and living "happily ever after", or simply that the reader sees hope for the future of the romantic relationship.

Due to the wide definition of romance, romance stories cover a wide variety of subjects and often fall into other genre categories in addition to romance. Subgenres include:

- Amish romance (aka bonnet rippers)
- Contemporary romance
- Fantasy romance
- Medical romance: For example, novels by Lucilla Andrews.
- Paranormal romance
- Regency romance
- Romantic thriller (or romantic suspense)

=== Satire ===
In satire, human or individual vices, follies, abuses, or shortcomings are held up to censure by means of ridicule, derision, burlesque, irony, or other methods, ideally with the intent to bring about improvement.

Satire is usually meant to be funny, but its purpose is not primarily humour as an attack on something the author disapproves of, using wit. A common, almost defining feature of satire is its strong vein of irony or sarcasm, but parody, burlesque, exaggeration, juxtaposition, comparison, analogy, and double entendre all frequently appear in satirical speech and writing. The essential point, is that "in satire, irony is militant". This "militant irony" (or sarcasm) often professes to approve (or at least accept as natural) the very things the satirist actually wishes to attack.

Often strictly defined as a literary genre or form, though in practice it is also found in the graphic and performing arts.

=== Science fiction ===
Science fiction (once known as scientific romance) is similar to fantasy, except stories in this genre use scientific understanding to explain the universe that it takes place in. It generally includes or is centered on the presumed effects or ramifications of computers or machines; travel through space, time or alternate universes; alien life-forms; genetic engineering; or other such things. The science or technology used may or may not be very thoroughly elaborated on.

- Apocalyptic and post-apocalyptic fiction: concerned with the end of civilization, either through nuclear war, plague, or some other general disaster. Post-apocalyptic fiction is set in a world or civilization after such a disaster. The time frame may be immediately after the catastrophe, focusing on the travails or psychology of survivors, or considerably later, often including the theme that the existence of pre-catastrophe civilization has been forgotten (or mythologized). Post-apocalyptic stories often take place in an agrarian, non-technological future world, or a world where only scattered elements of technology remain. There is a considerable degree of blurring between this form of science fiction and fiction that deals with false utopias or dystopic societies.
- Hard science fiction: stories whose scientific elements are reasonably detailed, well-researched and considered to be relatively plausible given current knowledge and technology. Examples include Jurassic Park (1990) and Prey (2002).
- Soft science fiction: stories in which the science involved is not detailed, typically dealing more with cultural, social, and political interactions.
  - Comic science fiction: exploits the genre's conventions for comic effect.
  - Military science fiction: in essence, the addition of science fiction elements into a military fiction story. These stories are told from the point of view of the military, or a main character who is a soldier in the military. It usually includes technology far superior to that of current day, but not necessarily implausible. (Some military science fiction stories fit at least somewhat into the "hard science fiction" subgenre as well.)
  - Feminist science fiction: tends to deal with women's roles in society. It poses questions about social issues such as how society constructs gender roles, the role reproduction plays in defining gender and the unequal political, economic and personal power of men and women. Some of the most notable feminist science fiction works have illustrated these themes using utopias to explore a society in which gender differences or gender power imbalances do not exist, or dystopias to explore worlds in which gender inequalities are intensified, thus asserting a need for feminist work to continue.
  - Libertarian science fiction: focuses on the politics and social order implied by libertarian philosophies with an emphasis on individualism and a limited state – and in some cases, no state whatsoever. As a genre, it can be seen as growing out of the 1930s and 1940s, when the science-fiction pulp magazines were reaching their peak at the same time as fascism and communism. While this environment gave rise to dystopian novels such as George Orwell's Nineteen Eighty-Four, in the pulps, this influence more often give rise to speculations about societies (or sub-groups) arising in direct opposition to totalitarianism.
  - Social science fiction: concerned less with the scientific background and more with sociological speculation about human society. In other words, it "absorbs and discusses anthropology", and speculates about human behavior and interactions. Exploration of fictional societies is one of the most interesting aspects of science fiction, allowing it to perform predictive and precautionary functions, to criticize the contemporary world and to present solutions, to portray alternative societies and to examine the implications of ethical principles.
- Space opera: a story characterized by the extent of space travel and distinguished by the amount of time that protagonists spend in an active, space-faring lifestyle.
  - Science fiction Western: stories in which elements of science fiction are introduced in a Western setting. It is the complement of the 'space Western', which transposes Western elements into the setting of outer space. One example of a sci-fi Western would be the Cowboys & Aliens comics. they are different from Space Westerns, which are frontier stories indicative of American Westerns, except transposed to a backdrop of space exploration and settlement.
  - Planetary romance: the bulk of the action consists of adventures on one or more exotic alien planets, characterized by distinctive physical and cultural backgrounds. Some planetary romances take place against the background of a future culture where travel between worlds by spaceship is commonplace; others, particularly the earliest examples of the genre, do not, and invoke flying carpets, astral projection, or other methods of getting between planets. In either case, the planetside adventures are the focus of the story, not the mode of travel.
  - Space Western: transposes themes of the American-Western genre to a backdrop of futuristic space frontiers. It is the complement of the 'science fiction Western', which transposes science fiction themes onto an American Western setting.

==== Cyberpunk and derivatives ====
Cyberpunk is a speculative subgenre of scifi that involves stories with a futuristic storyline dealing with people who have been physically or mentally enhanced with cybernetic components, often featuring cyborgs or the singularity as a major theme, and generally somewhat cynical or dystopian (hence the "punk" portion of the name). This is often confused or placed with techno-thriller, which is actually a separate and less specialized genre.

- Postcyberpunk: a sub-subgenre that some critics suggest has evolved from cyberpunk. Like its predecessor, postcyberpunk focuses on technological developments in near-future societies, typically examining the social effects of a ubiquitous datasphere of computerized information, genetic engineering, modification of the human body, and the continued impact of perpetual technological change. Unlike "pure" cyberpunk, the works in this category feature characters who act to improve social conditions or at least protect the status quo from further decay.

A category of several different subgenres have been derived from cyberpunk, normally characterized by distinct technologies and sciences. The themes tend to be cynical or dystopian, and typically involve a person, or group of people, fighting the corruption of the government.

- Retropunk: As a wider variety of writers began to work with cyberpunk concepts, new subgenres of science fiction emerged, playing off the cyberpunk label, and focusing on technology and its social effects in different ways. Many derivatives of cyberpunk are retro-futuristic, based either on the futuristic visions of past eras, or more recent extrapolations or exaggerations of the actual technology of those eras.
  - Atompunk: relates to the pre-digital, cultural period of 1945–1965, which includes: mid-century Modernism; the 'Atomic' and 'Space' Ages; post-war Communism and paranoia in the US along with Soviet styling; underground cinema; Googie architecture; the Space Race, Sputnik, and the Apollo 11 Moon landing; the golden-age of superhero comics; the rise of the American military–industrial complex; and radioactivity and the fall-out of Chernobyl. Communist analog atompunk is an ultimate lost world. The Fallout series of computer games is an example of atompunk.
  - Dieselpunk: Initially proposed as a genre by the creators of the role-playing game Children of the Sun, dieselpunk refers to fiction inspired by mid-century pulp stories, based on the aesthetics of the interbellum period through World War II (c. 1920–1945). Seemingly similar to steampunk in its themes of alternate history, dieselpunk is specifically characterized by the rise of petroleum power and technocratic perception, incorporating neo-noir elements and sharing themes more clearly with cyberpunk than steampunk. Some literature considered to be dieselpunk include The Man in the High Castle (1962), Fatherland (1992), The Plot Against America (2004), and Harry Turtledove's The War That Came Early series.
  - Steampunk: A story that takes place around the time steam power was first coming into use. The Industrial Revolution is a common time setting for steam punk stories, and the steam technology is often actually more advanced than the real technology of the time (for instance, the manga Steam Detectives features steam-powered robots). The most immediate form of steampunk subculture is the community of fans surrounding the genre. Others move beyond this, attempting to adopt a "steampunk" aesthetic through fashion, home decor and even music.
  - Clockpunk: This term has occasionally referred to a subgenre of speculative fiction that is similar to steampunk, but deviates in its technology. As with steampunk, it portrays advanced technology based on pre-modern designs, but rather than the steam power of the Industrial Age, the technology used is based on springs, clockwork and similar. Clockpunk is based very intensively on the works of Leonardo da Vinci and as such, it is typically set during the Renaissance. It is regarded as being a type of steampunk.
  - Mannerpunk: Also known as fantasy of manners, this subgenre combines tropes from traditional fantasy and the comedy of manners. Commonly shorthanded as "Jane Austen meets J.R.R. Tolkien," mannerpunk stories take place within an elaborate social hierarchy, with themes of class warfare and political intrigue, and battles of wits are more frequent than battles of arms. Magic and futuristic technology is rare or nonexistent in a typical mannerpunk setting, with fantastical trappings such as dragons and airships integrated into ordinary society. Swordspoint (1987) by Ellen Kushner was the first work to be labeled as mannerpunk.
- Biopunk: A story that is about genetics and biological research (often falling under the horror category). It often focuses on some harmful effects characters have created when they change an animal's code to (unintentionally) create a violent monster. Biopunk emerged during the 1990s and depicts the underground of the biotechnological revolution that was expected to start having a profound impact on humanity in the first half of the 21st century. Biopunk fiction typically describes the struggles of individuals or groups, often the product of human experimentation, against a backdrop of totalitarian governments or megacorporations that misuse biotechnologies for social control or profiteering. Unlike cyberpunk, it builds not on information technology but on synthetic biology.
  - Nanopunk: similar to bio-punk, but depicts a world where the use of biotechnologies are limited or prohibited, so only nanotechnologies in wide use (while in biopunk bio- and nanotechnologies often coexist). Currently the genre is more concerned with the artistic and physiological impact of nanotechnology, than of aspects of the technology itself, which is still in its infancy. Unlike the cyberpunk, a low-life yet technologically advanced character, the personification of a nanopunk can be set 'hard' or 'soft', depending on your views of the impact nanotechnology will have on our future.
- Solarpunk: A genre that envisions how the future might look if humanity succeeded in solving major contemporary challenges with an emphasis on sustainability problems such as climate change and pollution. Although solarpunk is highly concerned with technology, it also embraces low-tech ways of living sustainably such as gardening, positive psychology, and DIY culture.
- ~Punk: Other Punk settings can be described by taking many of the core themes of technological success of Steampunk and Cyberpunk, and replacing the theme's core item of interest, around which the story revolves. Examples Include Crystalpunk, Skypunk, and the afore mentioned Nanopunk.

=== Speculative ===
Speculative fiction speculates about worlds that are unlike the real world in various important ways. In these contexts, it generally overlaps one or more of the following: science fiction, fantasy fiction, horror fiction, supernatural fiction, superhero fiction, utopian and dystopian fiction, apocalyptic and post-apocalyptic fiction, and alternate history.

- Slipstream: Fantastic or non-realistic fiction that crosses conventional genre boundaries between science fiction/fantasy and mainstream literary fiction. The term slipstream was coined by cyberpunk author Bruce Sterling in an article originally published in SF Eye #5, July 1989. He wrote: "...this is a kind of writing which simply makes you feel very strange; the way that living in the 20th century makes you feel, if you are a person of a certain sensibility." Slipstream fiction has consequently been referred to as "the fiction of strangeness", which is as clear a definition as any others in wide use.
- Supernatural fiction: exploits or requires as plot devices or themes some contradictions of the commonplace natural world and materialist assumptions about it. It includes the traditional ghost story. The Turn of the Screw by Henry James is an example of a work of literary fiction that is also largely concerned with supernatural fiction elements, making play of the possibility that they are psychological at root, but requiring the option that they are not for effect.
- Superhero fiction: deals with superheroes, supervillains, super-powered humans, aliens, or mutants, and their adventures. Distinct from (but often derived from) comic books, animated films, and graphic novels, these are prose stories and full-length novels. Superhero fiction is a type of speculative fiction. The largest and longest running of the corporate series are those associated with the DC Universe and the Marvel Universe.
- Utopian and dystopian fiction: The utopia and its offshoot, the dystopia, are genres of literature that explore social and political structures. Utopian fiction is the creation of an ideal world, or utopia, as the setting for a novel. Dystopian fiction is the opposite: creation of a nightmare world, or dystopia. Many novels combine both, often as a metaphor for the different directions humanity can take in its choices, ending up with one of two possible futures. Both utopias and dystopias are commonly found in science fiction and other speculative fiction genres, and arguably are by definition a type of speculative fiction. More than 400 utopian works were published prior to the year 1900 in the English language alone, with more than a thousand others during the 20th century.
- Speculative evolution: a subgenre of speculative fiction and science fiction that focuses on hypothetical forms of biology, evolution and zoology.
- Weird fiction: Speculative literature written in the late 19th and early 20th centuries. Weird fiction is distinguished from horror and fantasy in that it predates the niche marketing of genre fiction. Because genre or stylistic conventions had not been established, weird tales often blend the supernatural, mythical, and even scientific. British "weird" authors, for example, published their work in mainstream literary magazines even after American pulp magazines became popular. "Weird fiction" is chiefly a historical description for works through the 1930s, but the term has also been used since the 1980s, sometimes to refer to slipstream fiction that blends horror, fantasy, and science fiction.
- Xenofiction: A niche genre following the perspectives of non-human characters, speculating on the societies, thought processes and lives of intelligent animals or other creatures.

Suppositional fiction is a subcategory in which stories and characters are constrained within an internally consistent world, but this category is not necessarily associated with any particular genre. A work of suppositional fiction might be science fiction, alternate history, mystery, horror, or even suppositional fantasy, depending on the intent and focus of the author.

=== Thriller ===
A thriller is a story that is usually a mix of fear and excitement. It has traits from the suspense genre and often from the action, adventure or mystery genres, but the level of terror makes it borderline horror fiction at times as well. It generally has a dark or serious theme, which also makes it similar to drama.

- Disaster-thriller: A story about mass peril, where the protagonist's job is to both survive, and to save many other people from a grim fate, often a natural disaster such as a storm or volcanic eruption, but may also be a terrorist attack or epidemic of some sort.
- Psychological thriller: emphasizes the psychological condition of the hero that presents obstacles to his objective, rather than the action. Some psychological thrillers are also about complicated stories that try to deliberately confuse the audience, often by showing them only the same confusing or seemingly nonsensical information that the hero gains.
- Crime thriller: A story that revolves around the life of detectives, mobs, or other groups associated with criminal events in the story.
- Techno-thriller: A story whose theme is usually technology, or the danger behind the technology people use, including the threat of cyber terrorism such as State of Fear.

=== Isekai ===
Isekai (Japanese: 異世界; transl. "different world" or "otherworld") is a Japanese genre of speculative fiction—both portal fantasy and science fiction are included. It includes novels, light novels, films, manga, anime and video games that revolve around people who are transported to and have to survive in another world, such as a fantasy world, virtual world, or parallel universe. Isekai is one of the most popular genres of anime, and Isekai stories share many common tropes – for example, a powerful protagonist who is able to beat most people in the other world by fighting. This plot device typically allows the audience to learn about the new world at the same pace as the protagonist over the course of their quest or lifetime.

=== Other ===
- Western: Stories in the Western genre are set in the American West, between the time of the Civil war and the early 20th century. The setting of a wilderness or uncivilized area is especially important to the genre, and the setting is often described richly and in-depth. They focus on the adventure of the main character(s) and the contrast between civilization or society and the untamed wilderness, often featuring the characters working to bring civilization to the wilderness. This genre periodically overlaps with historical fiction, and while a more traditional definition of westerns is that of stories about lone men facing the frontier, more modern definitions and writings are often expanded to include any person or persons in this time period that feature a strong tone of the contrast between civilization and wilderness and emphasize the independence of the main character(s).
- Paranoid fiction: works of literature that explore the subjective nature of reality and how it can be manipulated by forces in power. These forces can be external, such as a totalitarian government, or they can be internal, such as a character's mental illness or refusal to accept the harshness of the world they live in.
- Philosophical fiction: stories in which a significant proportion of the work is devoted to a discussion of the sort of questions normally addressed in discursive philosophy. These might include the function and role of society, the purpose of life, ethics or morals, the role of art in human lives, and the role of experience or reason in the development of knowledge. Philosophical fiction works would include the so-called novel of ideas, including a significant proportion of science fiction, utopian and dystopian fiction, and Bildungsroman. The modus operandi seems to be to use a normal story to simply explain difficult and dark parts of human life.
  - Bildungsroman: A coming-of-age novel presenting the psychological, moral and social shaping of the personality of a character, usually the protagonist. The genre arose during the German Enlightenment.
- Political fiction is a subgenre of fiction that deals with political affairs. Political fiction has often used narrative to provide commentary on political events, systems and theories. Works of political fiction often "directly criticize an existing society or... present an alternative, sometimes fantastic, reality". Prominent pieces of political fiction have included the totalitarian dystopias of the early 20th century such as Jack London's The Iron Heel and Sinclair Lewis's It Can't Happen Here. Equally influential, if not more so, have been earlier pieces of political fiction such as Gulliver's Travels (1726), Candide (1759), and Uncle Tom's Cabin (1852). Political fiction frequently employs the literary modes of satire, often in the genres of utopian, dystopian, and social-science fiction.
  - Utopian fiction: The creation of an ideal world, or utopia, as the setting for a novel
  - Dystopian fiction: The creation of a nightmare world, or dystopia, as the setting for a novel
  - Social science fiction
  - Survivalism: The creation of world where traditional society has collapsed usually due to some post apocalyptic or doomsday scenario, as a setting for a novel
- Sagas (from Icelandic saga, plural sögur): stories written in the Old Norse language, mainly in Iceland, that are about ancient Scandinavian and Germanic history, about early Viking voyages, about migration to Iceland, and of feuds between Icelandic families. The texts are epic tales in prose, often with stanzas or whole poems in alliterative verse embedded in the text, of heroic deeds of days long gone, tales of worthy men, who were often Vikings, sometimes Pagan, sometimes Christian. The tales are usually realistic, except legendary sagas, sagas of saints, sagas of bishops and translated or recomposed romances. They are sometimes romanticised and fantastic, but always dealing with human beings one can understand.
  - Family saga: The family saga chronicles the lives and doings of a family or a number of related or interconnected families over a period of time. In novels (or sometimes sequences of novels) with a serious intent, this is often a thematic device used to portray particular historical events, changes of social circumstances, or the ebb and flow of fortunes from a multiple of perspectives.
- Urban fiction (aka street lit): a literary genre set, as the name implies, in a city landscape, as well as being defined by the race and culture of its characters. The tone for urban fiction is usually dark, focusing on the underside. Profanity (all of George Carlin's seven dirty words and urban variations thereof), sex and violence are usually explicit, with the writer not shying away from or watering-down the material. In this respect, urban fiction shares some common threads with dystopian or survivalist fiction. In the second wave of urban fiction, some variations of this model have been seen.

== Film and television genres ==
While many genres of film and television originally derive from literature, genres in film and TV are also distinctly informed by audiovisual qualities, budgets, formats, and technologies. For that reason, film and TV genres may include additional categorical characteristics to consider, even diverging in some way from their literary counterparts altogether at times.

=== Scripted ===
- Anthology:
  - Anthology film: A film that consists of several different short films, usually connected only by a single theme, premise, or brief interlocking event. Examples include: The Ballad of Buster Scruggs (2018), New York Stories (1989), and Twilight Zone: The Movie (1983)
  - Anthology series: Presents a different story and a different set of characters in each episode. These usually have a different cast each week, but several series in the past, such as Four Star Playhouse, employed a permanent troupe of character actors who would appear in a different drama each week. Some anthology series, such as Studio One, began on radio and then expanded to television. Examples include: American Horror Story and American Crime Story.
- Art film and quality television: Television shows like David Lynch's Twin Peaks series and BBC's The Singing Detective also have "a loosening of causality, a greater emphasis on psychological or anecdotal realism, violations of classical clarity of space and time, explicit authorial comment, and ambiguity".
- Crime
  - Detective: a subgenre of crime and mystery in which an investigator or a detective—either professional or amateur—investigates a crime, often murder.
    - Gong'an
  - Film noir and neo-noir
  - Gangster: A genre that centers on organized crime or maverick criminals, typically in a 20th century setting.
    - Heroic bloodshed
    - Mafia: Films include The Godfather series and shows include The Sopranos.
      - Mafia comedy
    - Mumbai underworld
    - Yakuza
      - Gokudō
  - Heist: A thriller in which a criminal or group of criminals conceives and executes a major robbery. The theft usually involves gaining access to valuables stored in a high-security location, and the thieves may or may not use subterfuge to trick their way into and/or out of the stronghold. Examples include the Ocean's films.
  - Hood film
  - Mystery
  - Poliziotteschi
  - Vigilante
- Experimental: Subgenres include:
  - Absurdist: This subgenre focuses on characters who experience situations that descend into nihilism, i.e. situations that suggest there is no central purpose to life. Examples include: The Exterminating Angel (1962) and Brazil (1985).
  - Surrealist: The point of this subgenre is to not be stylistically defined, often using irrational imagery to activate the subconscious mind. There is often, though not always, a connection to comedy. Examples include: Eraserhead (1977) and 8 ½ (1963).
- Exploitation film
  - Blaxploitation
  - Sexploitation
- Gothic
  - Gothic romance
  - Gothic sci-fi
  - Southern gothic
  - Suburban gothic
  - Urban gothic
- Fantasy (film and television): featuring elements of the fantastic, often including magic, supernatural forces, or exotic fantasy worlds.
  - Contemporary fantasy: Subgenre that introduces elements of fantasy into or around a world that closely resembles the time period when it was conceived. Example include: the Harry Potter films and The Chronicles of Narnia films.
  - Urban fantasy: A story with elements of fantasy that takes place and deals with concepts/themes related to an urban environment. Examples include the shows Buffy the Vampire Slayer and Supernatural.
  - Dark fantasy: A story depicting elements of fantasy in a hostile and frightening world. Examples include: Pan's Labyrinth (2006) and Solomon Kane (2009).
  - High fantasy (aka epic fantasy): The fantasy equivalent of a historical epic or a space opera, this subgenre portray elements of fantasy in a fictional setting, and will include romance, battles, and mythical creatures. Examples include: The Lord of the Rings films and the Game of Thrones TV series.
  - Fantasy comedy
  - Contemporary fantasy
  - Fairy tale
  - Fantastique
  - Historical fantasy
  - Magic realism
  - Science fantasy
- Miniseries and Television movies
- Musical film
- Police procedural: This subgenre presents fictional drama the lives of police and/or detectives. Stories in this genre typically revolve around a crime that has been committed and must be solved by the end of the episode following a very generic and usually unchanging structure of events: the crime is committed, witnesses are questioned, an arrest occurs, and then a judicial conclusion wraps it up. The show communicates everything "by the book", as it would happen in real life. Examples include: Dragnet, which pioneered this genre; Law & Order, which follows officers up to the point of reading newly-arrested criminals their Miranda rights; and Dick Tracy (1990).
- Romance: This genre is defined by intimate relationships
  - Gothic romance film
  - Paranormal romance
  - Period romance: A romance story defined by its setting in historical time period. Examples include films like Pride & Prejudice (2005) and Jane Eyre (2011), as well as shows like Bridgerton.
  - Romance drama: A story defined by the conflict generated from a romantic relationship. Examples include Revolutionary Road (2008) and Blue Valentine (2010).
  - Romantic thriller
- Serial: A television show that is one continuous story. Each episode picks up from where the last one left off. The story may shift with a new season.
  - Dizi: A serial period or contemporary drama produced in Turkey and broadcast weekly in Turkey, the Balkans, the Middle East, Central Asia, and other regions. Depending on the audience, they may be dubbed or subtitled. Examples include: Muhteşem Yüzyıl, Binbir Gece and Gümüş. (See Turkish television drama.)
  - Soap opera: A genre of television in which shows usually come on every day of the week instead of once a week. Some can go on for over 50 years. Examples include: Guiding Light, As the World Turns, All My Children, Days of Our Lives, Doctors, EastEnders, General Hospital, The Young and the Restless and Coronation Street.
  - Mystery box show: A genre involving multiple complex plots about mysterious phenomena and entities that requires the audience to follow closely in an attempt to understand the central mystery or mysteries underlying the plot. These series often contain elements of science fiction or fantasy.
- Social problem film: Examples include Mr. Smith Goes to Washington (1939)
  - Social thriller: One example is Get Out (2017)
- Social: In Indian cinema terminology, social films (or simply socials) are films with a contemporary setting, as opposed to those with mythological and period settings. (Not to be confused with social films.)
- Sports: A genre in which protagonists play athletics or other games of competition. Examples include films like Remember the Titans (2000) and The Longest Yard (2005), and shows like Friday Night Lights.
- Telenovela: A serial melodrama, popular in Latin America and the Philippines, that are similar to a soap opera in miniseries format. They often feature love and drama, as well as other situations depending on the genre of telenovela. Examples include: Desire, Fashion House, and Wicked Wicked Games.
- Téléroman: A popular French-language annual series in Canada (Quebec).
- Thriller:
  - Mystery: As opposed to mystery in the crime genre, mystery thrillers do not involve or use law enforcement or the justice system as the main characters or backdrop for the story. Rather, a mystery here is defined by the plot, and both the character's and the viewer's relationship with the motivations and reality behind the events that occur. Films directed by M. Night Shyamalan are one example.
  - Political thriller
  - Psychological thriller: A story focusing and emphasizing the unstable psychological state of its characters. Commonly, there is a mysterious set of circumstances.
  - Techno thriller: This sub-genre is defined by a conflict that takes place for or through various forms of technology.

==== Action and adventure ====
- Action: works in this genre are generally defined by risk and stakes. Action films tend to feature a resourceful character struggling against life-threatening situations which generally conclude in victory for the hero. Subgenres include:
  - Superhero film
  - Disaster film
  - Girls with guns/swords: This is a subgenre of action films and animation (often Asian films and anime), that portray a strong female protagonist who makes use of firearms to defend against or attack a group of antagonists. The genre typically involves gun-play, stunts and martial arts action.
  - Heroic bloodshed
  - Spy: An action-centered narrative following a secret agent (spy) or military personnel member who is sent on an espionage mission. The genre focuses on the excitement and entertainment of espionage, rather than the political and psychological aspects. Examples include: the James Bond films, the Mission: Impossible films and TV series.
  - Wuxia action: A subgenre focused on martial arts. Examples include: Hero (2002) and Crouching Tiger, Hidden Dragon (2000).
- Adventure: features the hero in action scenes that display and explore exotic locations. Main plot elements include quests for lost continents, a jungle or desert settings, characters going on a treasure hunts and heroic journeys into the unknown. Adventure films are mostly set in a period background and may include adapted stories of historical or fictional adventure heroes within the historical context. Kings, battles, rebellion or piracy are commonly seen in adventure films. Adventure films may also be combined with other movie genres such as, science fiction, fantasy and sometimes war films. Subgenres of adventure films include:
  - Swashbuckler
  - Pirate

==== Animation ====
Although animation is listed under "genres" and is classified as a genre by many film critics and streaming services, there is an ongoing debate between the animation community and the general public whether animation is a genre or a medium; and that the genres in the "Live-action scripted" genre can also be portrayed in an animated format, and the below kinds of animation are not types of stories, but simply types of ways that a film can be animated.

The American Film Institute defines animated as "a genre in which the film's images are primarily created by computer or hand and the characters are voiced by actors". This classification includes:

- Traditional animation (aka cel animation): A way of animating a cartoon by drawing and painting pictures by hand. Examples include: Beauty and the Beast and Spirited Away.
- Animated series: A work created or adapted with a common series title, usually related to one another and can appear as much as up to once a week or daily during a prescribed time slot. Animated cartoon series are also sometimes created outside of broadcast television, as was the case for the Tom and Jerry short films that appeared in movie theaters from 1961 to 1962. Series can have either a finite number of episodes like a miniseries, a definite end, or be open-ended, without a predetermined number of episodes. Examples include: SpongeBob SquarePants, The Simpsons, and Avatar: The Last Airbender.
- Computer-generated imagery (CGI): A genre of animation that includes animating a cartoon on a computer modeling program. Models of characters or props are created on the computer, and then programmed to do something specific. Then, when the animation is completely programmed, the computer can play a completely computer generated movie. CGI is often used for the visual effects in Live Action films as well. Examples include: Up (2009) or Toy Story (1995).
- Stop motion: similar to traditional animation; instead of using hand drawn pictures, stop motion films are made with small figurines or other objects that have their picture taken many times over a sequence of small movements to create animation frames. Examples include: The Nightmare Before Christmas (1993), Coraline (2009), and Corpse Bride (2005).
  - Claymation: A form of stop motion animation, except the subjects used are built specifically out of clay. Examples include: Chicken Run (2000) and Early Man (2018)
- Puppetry: It is technically live action, but puppetry is a different way of "animating" a movie, and puppets are often used in lieu of live actors. Usually, there are small figurines or figures (similar to stop motion), but these are controlled and filmed in real time. Like CGI, puppetry can be found in live-action films as a method of achieving a special effect. Examples include: The Muppets, The Dark Crystal, and Thunderbirds.

==== Comedy ====
- Action comedy: A subgenre of comedy that emphasizes physically humorous antics, unorthodox body-language and oftentimes exasperating situations. Jackie Chan is an example of an actor known in this genre.
- Bromantic comedy: Examples include I Love You, Man (2009), Superbad (2007), and the Harold & Kumar films.
- Black comedy
- Comedy drama (aka dramedy): A hybrid genre of comedy and drama that combines humorous elements with serious dramatic subjects (e.g. illness, grief, divorce, heartache, death, etc.).
- Comedy horror: Examples include Jennifer's Body (2009), Tucker & Dale vs. Evil (2010), and Housebound (2014).
  - Zombie comedy (aka zom com or zomedy): This is a genre that blends zombie horror motifs with slapstick comedy, as well as dark comedy. Examples include Shaun of the Dead (2004) and Zombieland (2009).
- Comedy thriller
- Commedia all'italiana
  - Commedia sexy all'italiana
- Gross out
- Mafia comedy
- Mo lei tau
- Mockumentary: A story that employs the style of the documentary to present fictional, and generally humorous, events or characters. Very common in film and television programs, both as a full film or series, or as a brief sequence or episode within a larger work. Examples include This Is Spinal Tap (1984) and Best in Show (2000).
- Parody and spoof
  - Spoof talk shows: shows that seek to parody the formats of talk shows (particularly late-night) and public-access television, featuring interviews that are mostly scripted, shown in a humorous and satirical way, or engaging in subverting the norms of the format. Examples include: Space Ghost Coast to Coast, Tim and Eric Nite Live, Comedy Bang! Bang!, and The Eric Andre Show.
- Romantic comedy (aka rom-com)
  - Comedy of remarriage (pre-code)
  - Sex comedy
- Satire: a genre of literature and performing arts, in which vices, follies, abuses and shortcomings are held up to ridicule, ideally with the intent of shaming individuals, corporations, government, or society itself into improvement.
- Screwball comedy
- Silent comedy
- Sitcom (situational comedy): A generally lighthearted genre that features characters having to deal with odd or uncomfortable situations or misunderstandings.
- Sketch comedy
- Slapstick: A type of comedy involving exaggerated physical violence and activities beyond the boundaries of common sense. These hyperbolic depictions are often found in children's media, and light comedies. Examples of actors in this genre include Charlie Chaplin and Lucille Ball.
- Surreal humour: this genre uses humor to challenge casual and rudimentary reasoning and even the most basic purposefulness found within life.
  - Whimsical: this genre has to do with a sense of eccentric or quirky humor. Related styles exaggerate real life in a whimsical, eccentric, quirky or fanciful way, sometimes. Whimsical and related styles are exemplified by films such as Underground (1995), Amélie (2001), Micmacs (2009), and Dieta Mediterranea (2009).

==== Devotional ====
Devotional film is an Indian film genre. Also known as bhakti films, these are primarily based on the lives and stories of deities, other fantastical beings of religious significance and historical or mythological devotees. Such films may be based on Indian scriptures, religious literature, or the Puranas. Also known as the puranic genre. Up to 1923, 70% of Indian films belonged to this genre. However, after a number of such films started failing, the film industry began experimenting with other genres such as historical dramas and "socials" – films with contemporary settings. A sub-type of this genre is the amman film, revolving around characters' worship to Amman, an incarnation of Shakti. The devotional film genre, while immensely popular in Tamil cinema in the 1990s and early 2000s, experienced a resurgence in the 2020s.

==== Drama ====
Within film, television, and radio (but not theatre), drama is a genre of narrative fiction (or semi-fiction) intended to be more serious than humorous in tone, focusing on in-depth development of realistic characters who must deal with realistic emotional struggles. A drama is commonly considered the opposite of a comedy, but may also be considered separate from other works of some broad genre, such as a fantasy.

Given the broad definition of this genre, listed below are subgenres of drama that are not also associated with another genre (e.g. dramedy, also known as comedy-drama):

- Docudrama: A work that dramatically recreates real-life accounts. These programs often depict crime or criminals but can also be used to depict heroics or tell a less-explored side of a well-known story. This genre is often criticized for creating sensationalized programs intended to capitalize on public interest in lurid news stories; in the case of the Scott Peterson murder trial, a docudrama (The Perfect Husband) was filmed and aired during jury deliberations. Examples include: Captain Phillips (2013); 127 Hours (2010); The Onion Field; and United 93, which depicts the events aboard United Airlines Flight 93 on September 11, 2001 via reconstruction from the available evidence.
- Legal drama (aka courtroom drama): This genre presents fictional drama regarding the legal practice and is defined by lawyers and judges. Under this purview, law enforcement, lawyer work, civil litigation, etc., are all possible focuses of legal dramas. Legal thrillers can also be considered under this genre. Examples include: Law & Order (combination of legal and police drama, as the name suggests).
  - Trial film
- Medical drama: Based around the inherent drama involved among the inner workings of hospitals, medics helping patients, doctors–medical staff relationships, and the medical industry. This also includes medical procedurals that follow the day-to-day life of health care professionals. Most commonly, an accident occurs that requires the medics to help the injured. Most are usually based around a hospital, with some based around a mobile medical team, etc. Examples include films like Bringing Out the Dead (1999); and TV shows like Casualty, ER, Holby City, and House.
- Melodrama
- Military drama
- Philosophical drama: A genre of film and television that is primary focus is crime drama, that debates philosophies of the era depicted in film. Examples include shows like True Detective and Mindhunters.
- Psychological drama: a sub-genre of drama that places emphasis told from the angle of different psychological conditions. Examples include: Requiem for a Dream, Neon Genesis Evangelion, Jagten, The Truman Show, and The Power of the Dog.
- Political drama: a genre of films and TV shows that involve a political component, whether reflecting the creator's political opinion, or describing a politician or series of political events. Dramatists who have written political dramas include Aaron Sorkin, Robert Penn Warren, Sergei Eisenstein, Bertolt Brecht, Jean-Paul Sartre, Caryl Churchill, and Federico García Lorca. Television series that can be classified as political drama include: Yes Minister and its sequel Yes, Prime Minister, The West Wing, Borgen, Boss, Jack & Bobby, The Bold Ones: The Senator, Commander in Chief, and House of Cards.
- Teen drama

==== Historical ====
This genre includes works that deal with historical accounts or fictional narratives placed inside a historical setting.

Subgenres include:

- Alternate history: A genre defined by the rewriting of historical events for the sake of speculative outcomes. Examples include films like Inglourious Basterds (2009) and shows like The Man in the High Castle.
- Biopic: A story detailing the life of a real-life person, either spanning a large portion of the subject's life or focussing on a particular period of significance in that person's life. Examples include: A Beautiful Mind (2001) and Catch Me If You Can (2002)
- Historical epic: The dramatized account of a large-scale event that has an attached historical account, often providing assumptions that fill in gaps in the account and/or revising the account in some way. Examples include: Ben-Hur (1959) and Troy (2004)
- Historical event: focuses on a story that creates a dramatized depiction of an event that exists in popular accounts of history. One example is Apollo 13 (1995).
- Historical fiction: A fictional story that takes place during a historical time period, commonly taking a more liberal approach to representing history for the sake of drama and entertainment. This subgenre may use real-life events and people to build context, but they are meant to be accepted as a supposition rather than serve as an accurate historical account. Examples include Titanic (1997).
  - Costume drama: A type of drama that especially relies on lavish costumes and designs. This type crosses over with many other genres.
- Historical period drama (aka period piece): a film or show that is set in, and accurately depicts, a time period, rather than depicting specific real-life characters or events. A period piece may be set in a vague or general era such as the Middle Ages or a specific period such as the Roaring Twenties. Examples includes films like The Age of Innocence (1993) and Barry Lyndon (1975), as well as shows like Mad Men and The Alienist.

==== Horror ====
Horror is a genre in which works seek to elicit a negative emotional reaction from viewers by playing on the audience's primal fears.

Subgenres include:

- Found footage: Works featuring footage that appears to be an existing and informal recording of events with the purpose of simulating real-life horrific events. Though it can be used for any genre, found footage is most commonly used in horror. Examples include The Blair Witch Project (1999) and V/H/S (2012).
- Ghost: Works that use the spirit or soul of a deceased creature to introduce elements of horror. Examples include The Frighteners (1996) and The Others (2001).
- Monster or 'Creature Features': A story about a deformed or supernatural creature or set of creatures that terrorizes people. The only real requirement of this genre is that the antagonist be categorized as a monster. Examples include The Mummy (1932), and Pumpkinhead (1988).
  - Giant monsters (kaiju): Films featuring giant monsters, typically those that are big enough to destroy buildings. Some such stories depict two giant monsters fighting each other. Examples include the Godzilla films and Cloverfield (2008).
  - Vampire: Stories in which a vampire(s) is the main antagonist. Examples include Interview with the Vampire (1994), Near Dark (1987), and most films depicting Dracula.
  - Werewolf films: Stories in which a werewolf, or werewolves, is the main antagonist. Examples include An American Werewolf in London (1981) and The Wolfman (1941).
- Psychological horror: Examples include The Babadook (2014), The Silence of the Lambs (1991), and The Shining (1980).
- Folk horror: Horror themed around folklore, often featuring rural isolated settings, witchcraft and cults. Examples include The Wicker Man (1973) and Midsommar (2019).
- Satanic horror: depicts the devil and other associated wicked themes. Examples include The Exorcist (1973) and The Omen (1976).
- Slasher: A horror genre featuring a serial killer or other psychopath as an antagonist, who methodically kills a number of protagonists in succession. Dramatic suspense is heightened by the victims' obliviousness of the killer. The victims are typically in isolated settings and often engaged in sexual activity previous to the attacks. The "slasher" kills their victims by sneaking up on them and then bloodily stabbing and slicing them to death with a sharp object, such as a chef's knife. Gender roles in slasher films are of particular interest in feminist film theory, which has extensively examined the trope of the 'final girl'. Examples of this genre include the Halloween films and The Texas Chainsaw Massacre films.
- Splatter: A splatter story introduces elements of horror by focusing on the vulnerability of the human body, often involving torture and typically attempting to present gore as an art form. Examples include Day of the Dead (1985) and Jigoku (1960).
- Zombie: Plots in this genre generally involve a group of characters trying to survive in a world overrun by zombies. The specific cause for the event ranges from infectious disease to experimental drugs gone wrong. Examples include films like the Night of the Living Dead series and 28 Days Later (2002), as well as shows like The Walking Dead.
- Art horror
- Body horror - Horror involving the graphic transformation or degradation of the human body. Examples include The Fly (1986) and The Human Centipede (2009).
- Cannibal
- Comedy horror: A fusion of horror settings and elements with the comedy genre. Usually, the primary focus is on humour rather than eliciting fear. Examples include Shaun of the Dead (2004) and Zombieland (2009).
- Eco horror
- Fantastique
- Holiday horror
- Horror drama
- Lovecraftian horror
- Mumblegore
- Natural horror
- Psycho-biddy
- Religious horror
- Sci-fi horror

Horror subgenres originating from specific countries include:

- Chinese horror
- German underground horror
- Giallo
- Japanese horror
- Korean horror
- New French Extremity

==== Science fiction ====
Subgenres include:

- Cyberpunk: This subgenre is defined by a mixture of a desperate society oversaturated with the crime that takes place in a high-tech world that includes cybernetic organisms, virtual reality, and artificial intelligence. Examples include films like Blade Runner (1982) and Elysium (2013), as well as shows like Altered Carbon.
- Dieselpunk: A derivative of cyberpunk, dieselpunk refers to fiction inspired by mid-century pulp stories, based on the aesthetics of the interbellum period through World War II (c. 1920–45). Seemingly similar to steampunk in its themes of alternate history, dieselpunk is specifically characterized by the rise of petroleum power and technocratic perception, incorporating neo-noir elements and sharing themes more clearly with cyberpunk than steampunk. Though the notability of dieselpunk as a genre is not entirely uncontested, installments ranging from the retro-futuristic film Sky Captain and the World of Tomorrow to the 2001 Activision video game Return to Castle Wolfenstein have been suggested as quintessential dieselpunk works of fiction.
- Dystopian: A story that features a world or society that serves as a contradiction to an idyllic world. Often there is a centralized and oppressive government or religion that dictates the value of citizens on a dehumanizing level, and may or may not incorporate a destructive event that drove the creation of that centralized institution. Examples include Children of Men (2006) and Equilibrium (2002).
- Military: A story defined by a strict focus on the military conflict in a speculative or future setting. As opposed to films that merely include space warfare, a military sci-fi story is limited to themes and events directly tied to military service and battle. Examples include Starship Troopers (1997) and Arrival (2016).
- Post apocalyptic: Stories based around the occurrence, effects, and struggle generated by an apocalyptic event. Examples include: 12 Monkeys (1995).
- Space opera: Defined by a mixture of space warfare, travel, adventure, and romance. Examples include films like The Fifth Element (1997), shows like Star Blazers, and media franchises like Star Wars and Star Trek.
  - Science fiction Western: stories in which elements of science fiction are introduced in a Western setting. It is the complement of the 'space Western', which transposes Western elements into the setting of outer space. One example of a sci-fi Western would be Cowboys & Aliens (2011).
  - Planetary romance: the bulk of the action consists of adventures on one or more exotic alien planets, characterized by distinctive physical and cultural backgrounds. Some planetary romances take place against the background of a future culture where travel between worlds by spaceship is commonplace; others, particularly the earliest examples of the genre, do not, and invoke flying carpets, astral projection, or other methods of getting between planets. In either case, the planetside adventures are the focus of the story, not the mode of travel.
  - Space Western: transposes themes of the American-Western genre to a backdrop of futuristic space frontiers. It is the complement of the 'science fiction Western', which transposes science fiction themes onto an American Western setting. One example of this genre is the show Firefly.
- Steampunk: This subgenre is inspired by technology created during the 19th century and the industrial revolution, and may be set in a speculative future, alternate universe, or revision of the 1800s. Examples include films like Howl's Moving Castle (2004) and Mortal Engines (2018), and shows like The Wild Wild West.
- Tech noir: Defined by technology as the main source behind humanity's struggle and partial downfall; it is a hybrid of other works of fiction combining the film noir and science fiction or cyberpunk genres. It is a form of Neo-noir concentrating more on science fiction themes. The Terminator films are an example of this.
- Utopian: This genre is defined by an idyllic world, generally with such themes as peace, harmony, and a world without hunger or homelessness. Examples include: Gattaca (1997) and Tomorrowland (2015)
- Sci-fi comedy
- Fantastique
- Science fantasy
- Gothic sci-fi
- Sci-fi horror
- New Wave sci-fi
- Parallel universe
- Tokusatsu

==== Western ====
This genre set in the American West and embody the spirit, the struggle and the demise of the new frontier.

Subgenres include:

- Epic Western: A story that emphasizes and incorporates many if not all of the elements of western genre, on a grand scale.
- Empire Western: A story that follows a protagonist or a group of protagonists as they forge a large-scale business based on natural resources and land. It can also follow the creation of the railroad, or large-scale settlement.
- Marshal Western: A story that follows a lawman as they attempt to track down, apprehend, and punish a criminal or group of gangsters.
- Outlaw Western: A story that follows a criminal or group of criminals.
- Revenge Western: A western where the protagonist seeks revenge.
- Revisionist Western: A story that challenges and/or aims to disprove the notions propped up by traditional westerns.
- Science fiction Western: stories in which elements of science fiction are introduced in a Western setting. It is the complement of the 'space Western', which transposes Western elements into the setting of outer space. One example of a sci-fi Western would be Cowboys & Aliens (2011).
- Space Western: transposes themes of the American-Western genre to a backdrop of futuristic space frontiers. It is the complement of the 'science fiction Western', which transposes science fiction themes onto an American Western setting. One example of this genre is the show Firefly.
- Spaghetti Western: Western movie subgenre which began in the mid-1960s and is characterized by novel cinematography and cost-saving overseas production techniques. These films were made in Europe, primarily Italy and Spain, and set in the American Old West. These films were typically helmed by an Italian producer and director, and made for a significantly lower budget than was possible domestically in the United States.

=== Unscripted ===
==== By format and audience ====
- Amateur: The low-budget hobbyist art of film practised for passion and enjoyment and not for business purposes. A notable historical example is the Zapruder film (1963).
- Children's series: Aimed at children and families.
- Documentary: A feature-length or near-feature-length film depicting a real-world event or person, told in a journalistic style. (If told in a literary narrative style the result is often a docudrama.) Examples: Hoop Dreams and The Thin Blue Line (1988).
- Educational: helps kids learn their basics to go through school.
- Factual television: non-fiction television programming that documents actual events and people. These types of programs are also described as documentary, television documentary, observational documentary, fly on the wall, docudrama, and reality television. The genre has existed in various forms since the early years of television, but the term factual television has most commonly described programs produced since the 1990s.
  - Television documentary: A genre of television programming that broadcasts documentaries.
- Infomercials and Direct response TV (DRTV): These are television commercials that generally include a phone number or website. Long-form infomercials are typically between 15 and 30 minutes long, and short-form infomercials are typically 30 seconds to 120 seconds long. Infomercials are also known as paid programming (or teleshopping in Europe). This phenomenon started in the United States where infomercials were typically shown overnight (usually 2:00 a.m. to 6:00 a.m.), outside of prime time commercial broadcasting peak hours. Some television stations chose to air infomercials as an alternative to the former practice of signing off. As of 2009, most US infomercial spending is during early morning, daytime, and evening hours.
- Instructional: the use of television programs in the field of distance education. Educational television programs on instructional television may be less than one half hour long (generally 15 minutes in length) to help their integration into the classroom setting. These shows are often accompanied by teachers' guides that include material to help use this program in lessons. Instructional television programs are often shown during the daytime on PBS stations in the United States. However, fewer public television stations devote their airtime to ITV today than they do in the past; these days, ITV programs are either seen on a digital subchannel of non-commercial educational public television station, or passed on to a local educational-access television channel run by a public, educational, and government access (PEG) cable TV organization.
- Reality film and reality television: A purportedly unscripted work (though evidence suggests that some scripting or manipulation occurs) featuring non-actors interacting with each other or dealing with invented or contrived challenges, such as competing against others for a prize. Produced in a similar fashion as the documentary film genre, but with more emphasis on the showing of interpersonal conflict, emotional reactions, or unusual occurrences. The genre has numerous widely varying subgenres.
  - Court show: A court show is a television programming subgenre of either legal dramas or reality legal programming. Court shows present content mainly in the form of legal hearings between plaintiffs and defendants, which are presided over by a pseudo-judge. Court shows first arose in the United States, and are still predominantly found in the country today.
  - Dramality: a combination of television drama and reality television genres (e.g., the soap opera The Only Way Is Essex).
- Talk show: A television show in which one person (or a group of people) discuss various topics put forth by a talk show host. Usually, guests on a talk show consist of a group of people who are learned or who have great experience in relation to whatever issue is being discussed on the show for that particular episode. There are several major formats of talk shows, each subgenre generally predominating during a specific programming block during the broadcast day which informs the shows' overall style and themes. (Spoof talk shows are excluded from this list, as they are primarily scripted.)
  - Breakfast television: morning shows that generally alternate between news summaries, political coverage, feature stories, celebrity interviews, and musical performances.
    - Sunday morning talk shows: generally focus on political news and interviews with elected political figures and candidates for office, commentators, and journalists.
  - Daytime television: a block of TV shows that take place during the late-morning and afternoon on weekdays. Examples include The Ellen Degeneres Show.
    - "Lifestyle" or self-help: programs that generally feature a host or hosts of medical practitioners, therapists, or counselors and guests who seek intervention, describe medical or psychological problems, or offer advice. One example is The Dr. Oz Show.
  - Tabloid talk show: a subgenre of the talk show genre in which the host invites a guest (either "ordinary" people, celebrities, political commentators, etc.), or a group of guests, to discuss provocative topics, including their own interpersonal issues. With topics ranging from marital infidelity to more outlandish subjects, guests are encouraged to make public confessions, and even resolve their issues via on-camera "group therapy". These shows typically air during the day, though such criteria are not necessary for a talk show to be considered "tabloid". Examples include The Jerry Springer Show, Dr. Phil, and Maury.
  - Panel-discussion shows: evening (or late-night) programmes involving a group of people (often celebrities, comedians, politicians, experts, or other public figures) and usually a host/moderator, gathered to discuss a topic in front of an audience, usually with a focus on news, politics, and/or popular culture. Examples include After Dark, Real Time with Bill Maher, Loose Women.
    - Panel shows: programmes in which a panel of celebrities/comedians participate in quiz games structured to invoke discussion and comedic banter, mostly with the primary goal to entertain the audience rather than to win a prize. Examples include: QI, Never Mind the Buzzcocks, Mock The Week, 8 Out of 10 Cats, and Whose Line Is It Anyway?.
  - Late-night talk shows: talk shows that air or release (for web series) during the late evening/night, and focus primarily on topical comedy and variety entertainment. Most traditionally open with a monologue by the host, with jokes relating to current events. Other segments typically include interviews with celebrity guests, recurring comedy sketches, as well as performances by musicians or other stand-up comics.
  - Aftershows: feature in-depth discussion about a program that aired just before on the same network. These shows often have guests, who can include cast members and crew of the given show, as well as fans of the show. Example: Talking Dead (follows The Walking Dead).
- Variety show: Also known as variety arts or variety entertainment, this is an entertainment made up of a variety of acts (hence the name), especially musical performances and sketch comedy, and normally introduced by a compère (master of ceremonies) or host. Other types of acts include magic, animal and circus acts, acrobatics, juggling and ventriloquism. Variety shows were a staple of anglophone television from its early days into the 1970s, and lasted into the 1980s. In several parts of the world, variety TV remains popular and widespread.
- Television special

==== By subject ====
- Concert film
- Cooking show: A television program that presents food presentation in a kitchen television studio. Over the course of the program, the show's host, who is usually a celebrity chef, prepares one or more dishes over the course of the episode. The chef takes the viewing audience through the food's inspiration, preparation, and stages of cooking.
- Game show: depicting a real contest, typically a trivia competition or physical challenge, with rewards in prizes or money. More often the participants are ordinary "everyday" people, such as Let's Make a Deal, Wheel of Fortune, Jeopardy!, and The Price Is Right. The players may include celebrities, who can be found on such game shows as Match Game, Hollywood Squares, Hollywood Game Night and Celebrity Name Game.
- Home renovation: often following the progress of home improvement projects over a period of time. Includes varied sub-genres from documentary-style to challenge based game shows.
- Music television: where viewers listen to music on the television, commonly having a visual or complete music video. It is similar to a radio station apart from the visual components.
- News program: television news broadcasting depicting real, up-to-date events
  - Breaking news
  - Current affairs: Broadcast journalism in which the emphasis is on detailed analysis and discussion of a news story.
  - Debate show
  - Entertainment news: A form of entertainment journalism focusing on news involving the entertainment industry, including the world of film, television, and music.
  - Infotainment
    - Tabloid television (aka Teletabloid): a form of tabloid journalism wherein newscasts usually incorporate flashy graphics and sensationalized stories. Often, there is a heavy emphasis on crime, stories with good video, and celebrity news.
  - Traffic reports
  - Weather forecasts
- Political commentary
  - Public affairs: This refers to radio or television programs that focus on politics and public policy. Among commercial broadcasters, such programs are often only to satisfy U.S. Federal Communications Commission (FCC) regulatory expectations and are not scheduled in prime time. Public affairs television programs are usually broadcast at times when few listeners or viewers are tuned in (or even awake) in the US, in time slots known as graveyard slots; such programs can be frequently encountered at times such as 5–6 a.m. on a Sunday morning.
- Religious: produced by religious organizations, usually with a religious message. It can include church services, talk/variety shows, and dramatic movies. Within the last two decades, most religious programming is found on religious television networks.
- Stand-up comedy: A style in which a comedian performs in front of a live audience, speaking directly to them. The performer is commonly known as a comic, stand-up comic, stand-up comedian or simply a stand-up. In stand-up comedy the comedian usually recites a fast-paced succession of humorous stories, short jokes called "bits", and one-liners, which constitute what is typically called a monologue, routine or act. Some stand-up comedians use props, music or magic tricks to enhance their acts. Stand-up comedy is often performed in comedy clubs, bars, neo-burlesques, colleges, and theaters. Outside of live performance, stand-up is often distributed commercially via television, DVD, and the internet.
- Sports TV: The coverage of sports as a television program, on radio and other broadcasting media. It usually involves one or more sports commentators describing the events as they happen, which is called "colour commentary".

=== Other television-related topics ===
- Specialty channels are commercial broadcasting or non-commercial television channel that focus on a single genre, subject, or targeted television market at a specific demographic. The number of specialty channels has increased during the 1990s and 2000s while the previously common concept of countries having just a few (national) TV stations addressing all interest groups and demographics became increasingly outmoded, as it already had been for some time in several countries. About 65% of today's satellite channels are specialty channels.

== Video game genres ==
Genres in video games are formulated somewhat differently than other forms of media. Unlike film or television, which are typically distinguished by visual or narrative elements, video games are generally categorized into genres based on their gameplay interaction, since this is the primary quality from which one experiences a video game. In other words, the narrative setting does not impact gameplay; a role-playing game is still a role-playing game, whether it takes place in a magical kingdom or in outer space.

Most genres from all other types of media can be applied to video games, but are secondary to the genre types described below, which are those unique to video games.

=== Action and adventure ===
==== Action ====
Action games are those defined by physical challenges, including hand-eye coordination and reaction-time.

- Beat 'em ups
  - Hack and slash
- Fighting: games in which two or more playable characters fight, each character usually having their own unique moves. Often, the goal of the game is to be the last man standing. Mortal Kombat and Street Fighter are generally credited with popularizing the fighting game.
- Platform: games in which the core objective is for the player character to move (including jump and climb) between points in a rendered environment and avoid obstacles. These games tend to feature much uneven terrain, vertical environments, and player characters able to jump many times their own height. Some of the most well-known examples of this genre are the Super Mario and Sonic the Hedgehog franchises.
  - Metroidvania (or platform-adventure)
  - Run-and-gun platform
- Shooter: Where the main purpose is to fight using guns.
  - First-person shooter (FPS): A variant of the shooting game. In the game, the camera is actually in place of the character's eyes, so that you are playing the game from the character's view, looking down the barrel of a gun.
    - Massively multiplayer online First-person shooter (MMOFPS): An online gaming genre set in a persistent world with a large number of simultaneous players in a first-person shooter fashion. These games provide large-scale, sometimes team-based combat.
  - Hero
  - Light gun
  - Shoot 'em up
    - Run-and-gun
  - Tactical (aka soldier sim): have higher degrees of realism than other shooters, trying to simulate the feeling of being in combat. Example: Arma.
  - Third-person shooter: A shooting game where the camera angle is actually hovering behind the playable character as you play.
- Stealth: The player must proceed through an environment or complete an objective without being seen, as in the Metal Gear series of games.
- Survival
  - Battle royale: games involving last-man-standing gameplay

==== Adventure and action-adventure ====
- Grand Theft Auto clone
- Interactive fiction
  - Interactive film
  - Visual novel
- Metroidvania (aka platform-adventure game): platform games that use fundamental action-adventure elements such as the ability to explore an area freely, with access to new areas granted by either gaining new abilities or using inventory items. Examples: Metroid (1986) and The Legend of Zelda (1986)
  - Isometric platform-adventure
- Narrative adventure: games that allow for branching narratives, with choices made by the player influencing events throughout the game.
  - Walking simulator: narrative games that generally eschew any type of gameplay outside of movement and environmental interaction that allow players to experience their story through exploration and discovery. Examples: Gone Home, Dear Esther, Firewatch, Proteus, The Stanley Parable, Thirty Flights of Loving, and What Remains of Edith Finch.
- Point-and-click adventure
  - Escape the room
- Puzzle adventure
- Survival horror: The player is placed in a horrifying situation of which they must escape. The major emphasis of most survival horror games is placed upon tension and a truly terrifying or grisly scenario. Puzzle-solving is a major characteristic of the genre. Examples: Resident Evil, Silent Hill and Clock Tower series.

=== Role-playing game ===
Role-playing game (RPG) is one in which the player controls the actions of a character or characters immersed in some well-defined world. This is also similar to non-video game forms of gaming that involve roleplaying, including play-by-post gaming and tabletop roleplaying games. Most of these games cast the player in the role of a character that grows in strength and experience over the course of the game. The most exemplary of this genre are the Pokémon and Final Fantasy franchises.

- Action RPG
- First-person party-based RPG (or Dungeon RPG): RPGs in which the player (first-person perspective) leads a party of adventurers through a dungeon or labyrinth, typically in a grid-based environment. Examples: the Wizardry, Might and Magic, Bard's Tale, Etrian Odyssey, and Elminage series.
- Massive multiplayer online role playing game (MMORPG): similar to a regular RPG, but it is a multiplayer game played via the internet. During this game, thousands of players from around the world can play the same game at the same time and chat with each other. Players sign onto the game and complete quests while exploring the virtual world. Many MMORPGs are free-to-play, the most popular of which include RuneScape and TERA, while the most popular "pay-to-play" game is World of Warcraft.
- Open-world RPG: Where the object of the game is to dominate a virtual system (often a simulated natural system), wherein enjoyment is derived through self-expression imposed upon the virtual system. Example: Minecraft.
- Roguelike
- Tactical RPG

=== Simulation ===
Simulation games are designed to closely simulate real-world activities.

- Construction and management (CMS): require players to build, develop/expand, and/or manage a fictional community or project, such as a simulated zoo.
  - Business (aka tycoon games): Example: Rollercoaster Tycoon
  - City-building: Example: SimCity (1989)
  - Government
- Vehicle simulation
  - Flight Simulation: A game where simulating aircraft as realistically as possible is the goal. This includes aspects of simulating the particular flight model of an aircraft (flight behavior and characteristics), avionics, various aircraft systems, performance (like engine simulation), and atmospherics, such as weather, but often also includes simulations of the flight environment, such as radio communications (air traffic control), different maps or landscapes, airports, ground management and in combat flight sims also weapon systems and targets, such as tanks, SAMs, etc.
    - Amateur flight
    - Combat flight
    - Space flight: Example - Elite (1984)
  - Racing
    - Kart racing
    - Sim racing
  - Submarine simulator
  - Train simulator
  - Vehicular combat
- Simulation shooter: Features the basic mechanics of a shooter, where using a gun is the primary method of gameplay, but emphasizes realism, often incorporating features like ballistics and realistic character damage.
  - Tactical (aka soldier sim): have higher degrees of realism than other shooters, trying to simulate the feeling of being in combat. Example: Arma. (Could also be included under military simulation)
- Simulation strategy: A strategy game that emphasizes realism, such as the Total War series of games, usually focusing on a specific time and location in human history, such as the Roman Empire.
- Medical simulation: games in which the player takes the role of a surgeon or other medical profession. Examples: LifeSigns and the Trauma Center series.
- Military simulation: wargames with higher degrees of realism compared to other wargames and set in a fantasy or science fiction environment. These attempt to simulate real warfare at either a tactical or strategic level.
- Life simulation: games in which the player lives or controls one or more artificial lifeforms. Example: The Sims series.
  - Dating sim
    - Bishōjo
  - Digital pet
  - God
    - Evolution simulation: games in which the player evolves a creature or creatures. Example: Spore series.
  - Social simulation
- Sports: games that simulate playing real-life sports (racing games may also fall under this subgenre). Example: the FIFA series and Wii Sports
  - Olympic video games
  - Racing game: games in either the first-person or third-person perspective in which the player partakes in a racing competition with any type of land, air, or sea vehicles. They may be based on anything from real-world racing leagues to entirely fantastical settings. In general, they can be distributed along a spectrum anywhere between hardcore simulations, such as Gran Turismo, and simpler arcade racing games, such as Need for Speed. Racing games may also fall under the category of sports games.
- Digital tabletop and other: video games designed to simulate mechanical or other real-world games. These may include simulations of pinball games and casino games such as slot machines, pachinko, roulette, blackjack, and poker (including video poker).
  - Digital collectible card game: One example is video games based on Yu-Gi-Oh! Duel Monsters.
  - Gacha game
  - Roguelike deck-building

=== Strategy ===
Strategy: A game centered around controlling or commanding a large group of characters, such as an army. Gameplay is centered around getting them to perform tasks or build structures so as to increase their power or numbers. Often the player's opponent has an army of their own, and in order to win the player needs to use their abilities in a strategic way so as to capture rival territory or destroy enemy structures.

- 4X
- Auto battler
- Multiplayer online battle arena
- Real-time strategy (RTS): where everybody moves at the same time, and races to think of a better strategy than the other players. Most of these video games are about military.
  - Massively multiplayer online real-time strategy (MMORTS): An RTS game that is played online. Many players can sign on a play at the same time, creating empires and battling each other.
- Real-time tactics
- Turn-based strategy: Where everybody takes turns. Once everybody has placed their units and military characters in the right spot they can't move again until the next turn begins. This structure is prominently used in RPGs.
- Turn-based tactics
  - Artillery
- Tower defense: Where the goal is to defend a player's territories or possessions by obstructing the enemy attackers, usually achieved by placing defensive structures on or along their path of attack.
- Wargame: emphasize strategic or tactical warfare on a map. Wargames generally take one of four archetypal forms, depending on whether the game is turn-based or real-time and whether the game's focus is upon military strategy or tactics.
  - Grand strategy wargame
  - Military simulation: wargames with higher degrees of realism compared to other wargames and set in a fantasy or science fiction environment. These attempt to simulate real warfare at either a tactical or strategic level.

=== Other ===
- Alternate reality game (ARG)
- Incremental game
- Music game: Games in which music is usually played (as opposed to the musical genres in theatre and film, which refer to stories that feature characters singing about the events in the plot). To win, the player must match the rhythm of the music by pushing the right button combination until their opponents are unable to keep up with them. Examples: the Guitar Hero and Rock Band game series.
- Puzzle: where a player must solve puzzles to progress through the levels.
  - Hidden object game
  - Maze
  - Programming
  - Puzzle adventure
  - Sokoban
  - Tile-matching: the player manipulates pieces/tiles in order to make them disappear by matching a criterion. Examples: Tetris, Bejeweled, and the Candy Crush Saga
- Party: Mostly suitable for multiple players and social gatherings. In most of these, the player or players compete or cooperate in smaller games, or minigames, within the main game. This genre was popularized by Mario Party.
- Typing

=== Technical categories ===
==== By platform and interface ====
Platforms are particular combinations of hardware and associated software through which video games are operated. As such, games are sometimes categorized by platform or interface, as differences in technology can lead to distinct gameplay and aesthetic features, etc. (Games are typically designed to be played on a limited number of platforms.)

- Audio
- Arcade
  - Classic/Vintage: Usually associated with arcade games like Pac-Man, most of these games typically require the player to navigate a maze or other obstacle.
- Console
- Handheld
- Mobile
- Online
  - Browser
  - Cloud
  - Social-network
- PC game
- Text-based
- Tile-based
- Virtual reality
- Side-scrolling

==== By mechanics or other feature ====
Though some terms generally describe game mechanics rather than referring to a specific genre, they are often used to describe games as if it were in fact a defining genre.

- Open world and sandbox: In broad terms, such games include interacting systems that encourage player experimentation. The Sims (2000) is an example of a game that can be considered both open-world and sandbox.
  - Open world: a game mechanic of using a virtual world that the player can explore and approach objectives freely, as opposed to a world with more linear and structured gameplay. Example: The Elder Scrolls V: Skyrim and the Grand Theft Auto franchise.
    - Grand Theft Auto clone
    - Open-world RPG: Where the object of the game is to dominate a virtual system (often a simulated natural system), wherein enjoyment is derived through self-expression imposed upon the virtual system. Example: Minecraft.
  - Sandbox game: a video game with a gameplay element that gives the player a great degree of creativity to complete tasks towards a goal within the game, if such a goal exists. Minecraft and Roblox (2011) are some of the most notable examples of a sandbox game, with players able to enjoy in both creative modes and through more goal-driven survival modes.
    - Falling-sand
- Permadeath
- Multiplayer
  - Massively multiplayer online game
  - Multiplayer online battle arena
- Toys-to-life: Examples include Skylanders and Disney Infinity.

==== By intent ====
Though video games are typically developed for the function of entertainment, there are some games developed for additional purposes. These include:

- Advergame: promotional game or gaming software specifically made to advertise a product, organization, or viewpoint. Example: Pepsiman.
- Art: games that are designed to emphasize art and/or are structured around the intent to evoke a non-ludological reaction in its audience
- Casual: designed for ease of accessibility, simple-to-understand gameplay, quick-to-grasp rule sets, and generally low-intensity elements. They are aimed at mass market audiences rather than hardcore gamers. Example: Angry Birds (2009)
  - Hyper-casual
  - Hidden object
- Christian: games created to spread the Christian faith, as well as to provide Christian gamers with a common pool of games.
- Educational: games adapted for educational purposes, to be used at home or school.
- Esports game: a multiplayer game that are typically played competitively at the professional level.
- Exergame: games designed to provide exercise, often designed to use with an ancillary exercise input device. Example: Wii Fit (which uses the Wii Balance Board)
- Serious games

== Music genres ==
=== Popular music ===
Popular music: any musical style accessible to the general public and disseminated by the mass media.

- Blues: A somewhat somber, quieter style of music whose name refers to the unhappiness of the performer. These became popular in the early 20th century alongside jazz, and influenced the early development of rock music. A major genre within R&B, and one of its earliest genres as well.
- Country music: American popular music that began in the rural regions of the Southern United States in the 1920s. It takes its roots from southeastern American folk music and Western music. Blues modes have been used extensively throughout its recorded history. Country music often consists of ballads and dance tunes with generally simple forms and harmonies accompanied by mostly string instruments such as banjos, electric and acoustic guitars, fiddles, and harmonicas. The term country music gained popularity in the 1940s in preference to the earlier term hillbilly music; it came to encompass Western music, which evolved parallel to hillbilly music from similar roots, in the mid-20th century. The term country music is used today to describe many styles and subgenres. In 2009 country music was the most listened to rush hour radio genre during the evening commute, and second most popular in the morning commute in the United States.
  - Bluegrass: is a form of American roots music, with roots in the English, Irish, and Scottish traditional music, a notable blues and jazz influence and a high lonesome sound, being later influenced by the music of African-Americans. Unlike country music, bluegrass is mostly accompanied by acoustic stringed instruments.
- Electronic music: employs electronic musical instruments and electronic music technology in its production. It consists of a number of separate genres, many of which are still evolving. One major category within this form of music is electronic dance music (EDM), with its own multitude of genres and subgenres, which is primarily associated with the dance and club scene.
  - Ambient: focuses on the timbral characteristics of sounds, particularly organised or performed to evoke an "atmospheric", "visual" or "unobtrusive" quality.
  - Breakbeat: usually characterized by the use of a non-straightened 4/4 drum pattern (as opposed to the steady beat of house or trance). Includes work by Afrika Bambaataa, Davy DMX, Music Instructor and Bomfunk MC's.
  - Downtempo: a laid-back style similar to ambient music, but usually with a beat or groove unlike the beatless forms of Ambient music.
  - Drum and bass (or Jungle): emerged in the late 1980s and is characterized by fast breaks and basslines. Includes work by Roni Size, Chase & Status and London Elektricity.
  - Electro: directly influenced by the use of TR-808 and funk records. Includes work by Kraftwerk, Zapp and Hashim.
  - Eurobeat: two styles of dance music that originated in Europe: one is a UK variant of Euro disco influenced by dance-pop, and the other is a Hi-NRG-driven form of Italo disco. Both developed in the 1980s.
  - Glitch: described as a genre that adheres to an "aesthetic of failure", where the deliberate use of glitch-based audio media, and other sonic artifacts.
  - House: originated in Chicago, Illinois, US in the late 1970s and early 1980s; includes work by Fedde Le Grand and Frankie Knuckles.
  - Synthwave: influenced by 1980s film soundtracks and video games, using basslines and leads from an analog synthesizer. It expresses nostalgia for 1980s culture and its advancement towards the future, attempting to capture the era's atmosphere and celebrate it. Includes work by Kavinsky, Electric Youth and Power Glove.
  - Techno: emerged in Detroit, Michigan, US during the mid-to-late 1980s. Includes work by Tomcraft, Leftfield and Moby.
  - Trance: generally characterized by a tempo of between approximately 128 and 150 BPM, melodic synthesizer phrases, and a musical form that is progressive as it builds up and down throughout a track. Includes work by Svenson & Gielen, Cosmic Gate, PBK, Rank 1 and ATB.
  - UK Garage: generally connected to the evolution of house in the United Kingdom from early/mid-1990s. Includes work by T2, The Artful Dodger and Shanks & Bigfoot.
- Hip-hop and rap: more rhythmically based, mostly African-American urban-derived genres, with a wide array of subgenres between them.
- Jazz: originated at the beginning of the 20th century in African American communities in the Southern United States from a confluence of African and European music traditions. Jazz has, from its early 20th-century inception, spawned a variety of subgenres, from New Orleans Dixieland dating from the early 1910s, big band-style swing from the 1930s and 1940s, bebop from the mid-1940s, a variety of Latin jazz fusions such as Afro-Cuban and Brazilian jazz from the 1950s and 1960s, jazz-rock fusion from the 1970s and late 1980s developments such as acid jazz, which blended jazz influences into funk and hip-hop.
- Pop: once referred to any popular music during the time period, though the term has slowly gained use as a more specific (yet still somewhat vague) genre descriptor for music with a catchy, relatively consistent melody, among other aspects. It is commonly placed as having started in the mid-20th century, alongside rock music. Much dance music falls under this genre, and much modern rock music is considered to include elements of it as well, since bands such as the Beatles were a significant stylistic influence on what is now considered pop.
  - Adult contemporary music
  - Europop
  - K-pop
- Rock: originated from folk and blues. It used newer electrical instruments instead of relying solely on the classical woodwinds and stringed instruments. It first became popular in the mid-20th century because of famous bands like The Beatles and The Rolling Stones.
  - Folk rock
  - Heavy metal: Similar to rock, and generally considered a subgenre of it. It usually uses the same electrical instruments, but the music is more intense and less "pop" in style (see below) such as Black Sabbath, Judas Priest, Iron Maiden and Metallica.
  - Punk rock: developed between 1974 and 1976 in the United States, the United Kingdom, and Australia. Rooted in garage rock and other forms of what is now known as proto-punk music, punk rock bands eschewed the perceived excesses of mainstream 1970s rock. Includes work by The Adverts, the Sex Pistols and The Clash.
- Rhythm and blues (R&B) and Soul music: an evolving range of genres of popular African-American music that first began to develop in the early 20th century.

=== Latin and Caribbean-influenced ===
- Calypso: developed in the mid-20th century out of Kaiso music. The genre became a worldwide hit in the 1950s when the 1956 album titled Calypso was the first full-length record to sell more than a million copies.
- Reggae: first developed in Jamaica in the late 1960s. While sometimes used in a broader sense to refer to most types of Jamaican music, the term reggae more properly denotes a particular music style that originated following on the development of ska and rocksteady. Reggae is based on a rhythmic style characterized by accents on the off-beat, known as the skank. Reggae is normally slower than ska. Reggae usually accents the second and fourth beat in each bar. Reggae song lyrics deal with many subjects, including religion, love, sexuality, peace, relationships, drugs, poverty, injustice and other social and political issues.
- Reggaeton
- Tango
- Tropical
  - Mambo
  - Merengue: first developed in the Dominican Republic in the mid-19th century and has become very popular since then. The style of the genre uses the accordion usually as the lead instrument, the guitar and/or saxophone as the melody, tambora and güira percussion instruments and at intivals the marimba usually joining the combination.

=== Other ===
- Avant-garde music
  - Experimental music
  - Noise
  - Musique concrète
  - Electroacoustic
- Children's music
- Easy listening
  - Background music
  - Beautiful music
  - Elevator music
  - Furniture music
  - Lounge music
  - Middle of the road
  - New-age music
- Folk (aka traditional): adaptations of old stories that were passed from generation to generation. Considered somewhat more niche now.
  - Contemporary folk
  - Folk rock
  - Neofolk
    - Folk Noir
    - Neopagan
  - Protest song
  - Psychedelic folk
  - Western music
- Funk: An intense groovy style of music popular in the mid 20th century that contributed to the development of disco.
- Martial
- Opera, Operette, and Zarzuela
- Progressive
- Psychedelic
- Religious music
  - Christian music
    - Christian R&B
    - Gospel music

=== By time period ===
- Early music: music from the year 500 through 1600. Early music is a broad musical era for the beginning of Western art music.
  - Medieval music: music composed from around the middle of the 5th century to the middle of the 15th century, largely characterized by monophonic and polyphonic music.
  - Renaissance music: largely composed from the middle of the 15th century to around 1600.
- Common-practice period: (1650–1900)
  - Baroque music: composed from around 1600 to the middle of the 18th century. Much Baroque music is written in the form of dance suites.
  - Galant music: composed from the 1720s–70s.
  - Classical: music that was composed from around the middle of the 18th century until the early 19th century. The key musical forms were the symphony, the concerto, and the sonata. Also includes some more recently written music (Neo-classical) that contains many of the same musical elements.
  - Romantic: composed from the early 19th century to about 1910, which emphasized dramatic themes and subject matter.
    - Neo-romantic: more recently written music that contain similar musical elements as the romantic period.
- 20th-century (including 20th-century classical) and contemporary classical: a wide classification of music composed in the 20th century to the present. Music from the 20th century deals largely with sound experimentation and moving away from the traditional tendencies of tonality.
  - Modernism (1890–1930)
  - Impressionism (1875 or 1890–1925)
  - Neoclassicism (1920–1950)
  - High modernism (1930–present)
  - Postmodern (1930–present) eras
  - Experimental (1950–present)
