= Elvira Woodruff =

American children's writer (born 1951)

Elvira Woodruff (born June 18, 1951) is an American children's writer known for books that include elements of fantasy and history.

== Writing ==
Elvira Pirozzi was born in Somerville, New Jersey, and attended Adelphi University and Boston University for one year each as an English literature major. She held diverse jobs including janitor, gardener, ice-cream truck driver, receptionist, window-dresser, store owner, and baker. Her first marriage did not last, and she found herself divorced and raising two young sons. She worked as a librarian in Easton, Pennsylvania and read stories to young children. She began writing. By 1999, she had written twenty children's books.

== Reviews ==
Kirkus Reviews described her book Small Beauties as a "little history in a lovely story," and her book The Memory Coat as an exploration of how Russian-Jewish families escaped oppression to come to America. Publishers Weekly described her book The Summer I Shrunk My Grandmother as a deft blend of "magic and farce" and a "lighthearted romp about a somewhat misguided budding scientist".

== Books ==
=== Dear Levi ===
1. Dear Levi: Letters from the Overland Trail: Letters from the Overland Trail (Alfred A. Knopf, 1994), illustrated by Beth Peck OCLC 28724034
2. Dear Austin: Letters from the Underground Railroad (Knopf, 1998), illus. Nancy Carpenter OCLC 38390085

=== Time Travelers ===
1. George Washington's Socks (Scholastic, 1991)
2. George Washington’s Spy: A Time-travel Adventure (2010)

=== Other ===
- Awfully Short for the Fourth Grade (Holiday House, 1989), illus. Will Hillenbrand – Woodruff's first book published
- The Summer I Shrank My Grandmother (1990)
- Tubtime (Holiday House, 1990)
- Mrs. McClosky's Monkeys (Scholastic, 1991) – Woodruff's first manuscript sale
- Back in Action (1991)
- The Wing Shop (1991)
- Show And Tell (1991)
- Dear Napoleon, I Know You're Dead, But ... (Holiday House, 1992), illus. Noah and Jess Woodruff OCLC 25281797
- The Disappearing Bike Shop (1992)
- Ghosts Don't Get Goose Bumps (1993)
- The Secret Funeral of Slim Jim the Snake (1993)
- The Magnificent Mummy Maker (1994)
- Dragon in My Backpack (1996)
- The Orphan Of Ellis Island: A Time-travel Adventure (1997) OCLC 33406510
- Can You Guess Where We're Going? (1998)
- The Memory Coat (1999)
- The Ghost of Lizard Light (1999)
- The Christmas Doll (2000)
- The Ravenmaster's Secret: Escape from the Tower of London (Scholastic, 2003)
- Small Beauties: The Journey of Darcy Heart O'Hara (2006)
- Fearless (2007)
- To Knit or Not to Knit: Helpful and Humorous Hints for the Passionate Knitter (2014)
