= George Washington's Socks =

1991 novel by Elvira Woodruff

- Cover of a later edition
- Author: Elvira Woodruff
- Series: Time Travel Adventures
- Genre: Children's fiction
- Publisher: Scholastic
- Publication date: 1991
- Publication place: United States
- Media type: Print, audiobook
- Pages: 166
- ISBN: 0-590-44035-7
- LC Class: PZ7.W8606 In 1991
- Followed by: George Washington's Spy

George Washington's Socks is a children's novel by Elvira Woodruff. It was published by Scholastic Books in 1991 and is the first book in her Time Travel Adventures series. The book has been used in classrooms to teach children about social studies and American history.

== Synopsis ==
When siblings Matthew and Katie Carlton enter a rowboat with their friends Tony, Q, and Hooter, the last thing they expected was for them to be transported back in time to 1776. There they meet George Washington himself and find themselves caught up with his struggle for independence.

== Reception ==
Publishers Weekly wrote in a review, "The harsh conditions and brutal implications of the historic battle interspersed with snappy dialogue and 20th-century humor proves an appealing mix, though older readers may find the anti-war message a bit heavy-handed." In their publication Pennsylvania Legacies, The Historical Society of Pennsylvania commented that the book would appeal to readers of fantasy novels and adventure stories. George Washington's Spy is the sequel to George Washington's Socks.
