= Intergalactic travel =

Hypothetical travel between galaxies

Intergalactic travel is the hypothetical travel between galaxies. Because the Milky Way and its closest neighbors are separated by millions of light-years, any such venture would also require millions of years based on our current understanding of physics. The technology required to travel between galaxies is far beyond humanity's present capabilities, and currently only the subject of speculation, hypothesis, and science fiction.

== Possible methods ==
=== Hypervelocity stars ===
Theorized in 1988, and observed in 2005, hypervelocity stars move faster than the escape velocity of the Milky Way, and are traveling out into intergalactic space. There are several theories for their existence. One of the mechanisms would be that the supermassive black hole at the center of the Milky Way ejects some stars from the galaxy at a rate of about one every hundred thousand years. Another theorized mechanism might be a supernova explosion in a binary system. Intergalactic travel using these stars would involve entering into an orbit around them and waiting for them to reach another galaxy.

=== Time dilation ===
While it takes light approximately 2.54 million years to traverse the gulf of space between Earth and, for instance, the Andromeda Galaxy, it would take a much shorter amount of time from the point of view of a traveler at close to the speed of light due to the effects of time dilation; the time experienced by the traveler depending both on velocity (anything less than the speed of light) and distance traveled (length contraction). Intergalactic travel for humans is therefore possible, in theory, from the point of view of the traveler. For example, a rocket that accelerated at standard acceleration due to gravity toward the Andromeda Galaxy and started to decelerate halfway through the trip would arrive in about 28 years, from the frame of reference of the observer.

=== Superluminal methods ===
The Alcubierre drive is a hypothetical concept that is able to propel a spacecraft to speeds faster than light (the spaceship itself would not move faster than light, but the space around it would). This could in theory allow practical intergalactic travel. There is no known way to create the space-distorting wave this concept needs to work, but the metrics of the equations comply with relativity and the limit of light speed.

A wormhole is a hypothetical tunnel through space-time that would allow instantaneous intergalactic travel to the most distant galaxies even billions of light years away. Wormholes are allowed by general relativity.

== See also ==
- Levels of spaceflight: Suborbital, orbital, interplanetary, interstellar and intergalactic
- Space travel in science fiction
- Uploaded astronaut
