= Mafia comedy film =

Film genre

Mafia comedy films are a subgenre hybrid of comedy films and crime/gangster films.

== Criteria ==
Mafia comedies revolve around organized crime, often specifically the Italian-American Mafia but also other mafias or mafia-like crime groups, and a comedic plot line, usually involving a chase or a complicated situation involving gangsters or organized crime. Much of the humor in such films is based upon the portrayal of gangsters as ordinary people. The perceived view of gangsters is that they are tough, serious, mysterious, and often quite evil characters; so when a film portrays a side of normality to a gangster character, it can have a humorous effect. Crime/gangster films typically involve many comedic moments, especially during witty conversations between gang members. This can be seen in such films as Goodfellas, Casino, Lock, Stock and Two Smoking Barrels, Pulp Fiction, and Snatch.

== Examples of mafia comedy ==
- The Crew
- Some Like It Hot
- Made
- Mafioso
- The Gang That Couldn't Shoot Straight
- Prizzi's Honor
- Johnny Dangerously
- Oscar
- The Whole Nine Yards
- My Blue Heaven
- Wise Guys
- Corky Romano
- The Freshman
- Harlem Nights
- Married to the Mob
- Mickey Blue Eyes
- Jane Austen's Mafia!
- Analyze This
- Analyze That
- You Kill Me
- 8 Heads in a Duffel Bag
- The television series Lilyhammer
- The Irish crime thriller, In Bruges, which stars Colin Farrell, may also be considered a dark mob comedy.
