= World Fantasy Special Award—Professional =

Literary award for professional science fiction or fantasy achievements

- Awarded for: The best professional work not covered by other World Fantasy Award categories
- Presented by: World Fantasy Convention
- First award: 1975
- Most recent winner: Clive Bloom (London Uncanny: A Gothic Guide to the Capital in Weird History and Fiction)
- Website: worldfantasy.org/awards/

The World Fantasy Awards are given each year by the World Fantasy Convention for the best fantasy fiction and art published in English during the preceding calendar year. The awards have been described by sources such as The Guardian as a "prestigious fantasy prize", and one of the three most renowned speculative fiction awards, along with the Hugo and Nebula Awards (which cover both fantasy and science fiction). The World Fantasy Special Award—Professional is given each year to individuals for their professional work in the preceding calendar year in fields related to fantasy that is not covered by other World Fantasy Award categories. These have included editors of magazines and novels, publishers, and authors of non-fiction works. Occasionally, especially in the first few years of the award, some publishing companies were nominated along with individual editors and publishers. The nomination reasons were not specified in the first year of the award, and have sometimes not been specified beyond "contributions to the genre". Individuals are also eligible for the Special Award—Non-professional category for their non-professional work. The World Fantasy Special Award—Professional has been awarded annually since 1975.

World Fantasy Award nominees and winners are decided by attendees and judges at the annual World Fantasy Convention. A ballot is posted in June for attendees of the current and previous two conferences to determine two of the finalists, and a panel of five judges adds three or more nominees before voting on the overall winner. The panel of judges is typically made up of fantasy authors and is chosen each year by the World Fantasy Awards Administration, which has the power to break ties. The final results are presented at the World Fantasy Convention at the end of October. Winners were presented with a statue in the form of a bust of H. P. Lovecraft through the 2015 awards; more recent winners receive a statuette of a tree.

During the 52 nomination years, 183 individuals and 5 publishing companies have been nominated; 62 people have won, including ties and co-nominees. For his work at Donald M. Grant, Publisher Donald M. Grant has won three times out of eight nominations, and six other nominees have won twice. Ian Ballantine and Betty Ballantine have won twice out of two nominations each for their non-fiction and publishing work, and Peter Crowther twice out of four nominations for his work at PS Publishing. Edward L. Ferman won twice out of six nominations for his work at The Magazine of Fantasy & Science Fiction, Stephen Jones twice out of seven for his editing and anthology work, and Gordon Van Gelder twice out of seven nominations for his editing work in both books and The Magazine of Fantasy & Science Fiction. Ellen Datlow has received the most nominations with ten, winning once, for her editing and anthology work, and David Pringle has the most nominations without winning with five, for his work at Interzone and for "contributions to the genre".

== Winners and nominees ==
In the following table, the years correspond to the date of the ceremony, rather than when the work was performed. The table includes the stated reason the individual (or company) was nominated, which may not have been the only fantasy-related professional work they did during the previous calendar year. "N/A" in the reason column represents a nomination where no reason was given. Entries with a yellow background and an asterisk (*) next to the individual's name have won the award; the other entries are the other nominees on the shortlist.

* Winners

Winners and nominees
Year	Winner or nominee	Reason(s)	Ref.
1975	Ian Ballantine*	N/A	
1975	Betty Ballantine*	N/A	
1975	Donald A. Wollheim	N/A	
1976	Donald M. Grant*	publishing	
1976	Donald A. Wollheim	publishing and editing	
1976	Arkham House	publishing	
1976	Frank Belknap Long	Howard Phillips Lovecraft: Dreamer on the Nightside	
1976	Willis Conover	Lovecraft at Last	
1976	L. Sprague de Camp	Lovecraft: A Biography	
1977	Shelley Torgeson*	Alternate World Recordings	
1977	Roy Torgeson*	Alternate World Recordings	
1977	Arkham House	publishing	
1977	Edward L. Ferman	The Magazine of Fantasy & Science Fiction	
1977	DAW Books	publishing	
1977	Ballantine Books	publishing	
1978	Everett F. Bleiler*	N/A	
1978	Edward L. Ferman	The Magazine of Fantasy & Science Fiction	
1978	Donald A. Wollheim	DAW Books	
1978	Judy-Lynn del Rey	Ballantine Books	
1978	Lester del Rey	Ballantine Books	
1979	Edward L. Ferman*	The Magazine of Fantasy & Science Fiction	
1979	Donald M. Grant	Donald M. Grant, Publisher	
1980	Donald M. Grant*	Donald M. Grant, Publisher	
1980	Pat LoBrutto	Doubleday	
1980	James Turner	Arkham House	
1980	Donald A. Wollheim	DAW Books	
1980	Lester del Rey	Ballantine Del Rey Fantasy	
1981	Donald A. Wollheim*	DAW Books	
1981	Tim Underwood	Underwood–Miller	
1981	Chuck Miller	Underwood–Miller	
1981	Terry Carr	anthologies	
1981	Lester del Rey	Ballantine Del Rey	
1981	David G. Hartwell	Timescape Books	
1981	Edward L. Ferman	The Magazine of Fantasy & Science Fiction	
1982	Edward L. Ferman*	The Magazine of Fantasy & Science Fiction	
1982	David G. Hartwell	Timescape Books	
1982	T. E. D. Klein	The Twilight Zone Magazine	
1982	Tim Underwood	Underwood–Miller	
1982	Chuck Miller	Underwood–Miller	
1982	Donald M. Grant	Donald M. Grant, Publisher	
1983	Donald M. Grant*	Donald M. Grant, Publisher	
1983	Lester del Rey	Ballantine Del Rey	
1983	David G. Hartwell	Timescape Books	
1983	Pat LoBrutto	Doubleday	
1983	Douglas E. Winter	writing and reviewing	
1984	Ian Ballantine*	The High Kings	
1984	Betty Ballantine*	The High Kings	
1984	Joy Chant*	The High Kings	
1984	George Sharp*	The High Kings	
1984	David Larkin*	The High Kings	
1984	Edward L. Ferman	The Magazine of Fantasy & Science Fiction	
1984	Pat LoBrutto	Doubleday	
1984	L. Sprague de Camp	Dark Valley Destiny	
1984	Catherine Crook de Camp	Dark Valley Destiny	
1984	Jane Whittington Griffin	Dark Valley Destiny	
1984	Everett F. Bleiler	The Guide to Supernatural Fiction	
1985	Chris Van Allsburg*	The Mysteries of Harris Burdick	
1985	T. E. D. Klein	The Twilight Zone Magazine	
1985	Pat LoBrutto	Doubleday	
1985	Shawna McCarthy	Asimov's Science Fiction	
1985	Tim Underwood	Underwood–Miller	
1985	Chuck Miller	Underwood–Miller	
1985	Robert H. Boyer	Fantasists on Fantasy	
1985	Kenneth J. Zahorski	Fantasists on Fantasy	
1986	Pat LoBrutto*	Doubleday	
1986	Terri Windling	editing	
1986	Donald M. Grant	Donald M. Grant, Publisher	
1986	Thomas Canty	A Monster at Christmas	
1986	Phil Hale	A Monster at Christmas	
1987	Jane Yolen*	Favorite Folktales from Around the World	
1987	Terri Windling	Ace Books	
1987	Simon Ounsley	Interzone	
1987	David Pringle	Interzone	
1987	David G. Hartwell	Arbor House	
1987	Donald M. Grant	Donald M. Grant, Publisher	
1987	Jack Sullivan	The Penguin Encyclopedia of Horror and the Supernatural	
1988	David G. Hartwell*	Arbor House, Tor Books, anthologies	
1988	Dean Koontz	service to the field	
1988	Terri Windling	Ace Books, Armadillo	
1988	Shawna McCarthy	Bantam Spectra	
1988	Tappan King	The Twilight Zone Magazine	
1988	Gardner Dozois	Asimov's Science Fiction, anthologies	
1988	George Scithers	Weird Tales	
1989	Terri Windling*	editing	
1989	Robert Weinberg*	A Biographical Dictionary of Science Fiction and Fantasy Artists	
1989	Ellen Datlow	Omni, anthologies	
1989	Dean Koontz	writing	
1989	Paul Mikol	Dark Harvest	
1989	Scot Stadalsky	Dark Harvest	
1990	Mark V. Ziesing*	Mark V. Ziesing	
1990	Ellen Datlow	editing	
1990	Paul Mikol	Dark Harvest	
1990	Scot Stadalsky	Dark Harvest	
1990	Tim Underwood	Underwood–Miller	
1990	Chuck Miller	Underwood–Miller	
1991	Arnie Fenner*	designing, Mark V. Ziesing, and Ursus	
1991	Ellen Datlow	editing	
1991	Paul Mikol	Dark Harvest	
1991	Scot Stadalsky	Dark Harvest	
1991	David Pringle	Interzone	
1991	S. T. Joshi	The Weird Tale	
1992	George Scithers*	Weird Tales	
1992	Darrell Schweitzer*	Weird Tales	
1992	Ramsey Campbell	writing and editing	
1992	Donald M. Grant	publishing	
1992	Dean Wesley Smith	publishing, Pulphouse Publishing	
1992	Kristine Kathryn Rusch	publishing, Pulphouse Publishing	
1992	Terri Windling	editing	
1993	Jeanne Cavelos*	editing Dell Abyss	
1993	Martin H. Greenberg	anthologies	
1993	Terri Windling	editing	
1993	Grant Morrison	Batman: Gothic	
1993	Klaus Janson	Batman: Gothic	
1993	James Gurney	Dinotopia	
1994	Tim Underwood*	publishing, Underwood–Miller	
1994	Chuck Miller*	publishing, Underwood–Miller	
1994	John Clute	reviewing	
1994	Ellen Datlow	editing	
1994	Terri Windling	book editing	
1994	Mark V. Ziesing	publishing	
1994	David J. Skal	The Monster Show: A Cultural History of Horror	
1995	Ellen Datlow*	editing	
1995	Fedogan & Bremer	book publishing	
1995	John Clute	reviewing	
1995	Mark V. Ziesing	Mark V. Ziesing	
1995	Paul Williams	The Ultimate Egoist: Volume I: The Complete Stories of Theodore Sturgeon by Theodore Sturgeon	
1996	Richard Evans*	contributions to the genre	
1996	Stephen Jones	editing and anthologies	
1996	Kristine Kathryn Rusch	editing The Magazine of Fantasy & Science Fiction	
1996	Gordon Van Gelder	editing	
1996	Paul Williams	Microcosmic God: Volume II: The Complete Stories of Theodore Sturgeon and for his work with the Literary Estate of Theodore Sturgeon	
1997	Michael J. Weldon*	The Psychotronic Video Guide	
1997	Stephen Jones	editing and anthologies	
1997	David Pringle	contributions to the genre	
1997	Kristine Kathryn Rusch	editing The Magazine of Fantasy & Science Fiction	
1997	Diana Wynne Jones	The Tough Guide to Fantasyland	
1998	John Clute*	The Encyclopedia of Fantasy	
1998	John Grant*	The Encyclopedia of Fantasy	
1998	Ellen Datlow	editing and anthologies	
1998	Gardner Dozois	editing and anthologies	
1998	Stephen Jones	editing and anthologies	
1998	Gordon Van Gelder	editing books at St. Martin's Press and editing The Magazine of Fantasy & Science Fiction	
1999	Jim Turner*	Golden Gryphon Press	
1999	Jo Fletcher	editing	
1999	David Pringle	Interzone	
1999	Robert Silverberg	editing The Avram Davidson Treasury	
1999	Grania Davis	editing The Avram Davidson Treasury	
1999	Les Daniels	Superman: The Complete History	
2000	Gordon Van Gelder*	editing books at St. Martin's Press and editing The Magazine of Fantasy & Science Fiction	
2000	John Betancourt	Wildside Press	
2000	Warren Lapine	DNA Publications	
2000	Seamus Heaney	the new translation of Beowulf	
2000	Stephen Jones	The Essential Monster Movie Guide	
2000	Kim Newman	Millennium Movies	
2001	Tom Shippey*	J. R. R. Tolkien: Author of the Century	
2001	Ellen Datlow	editing Sci Fiction and anthologies	
2001	William K. Schafer	Subterranean Press	
2001	Gary Turner	Golden Gryphon Press	
2001	Marty Halpern	Golden Gryphon Press	
2001	Cathy Fenner	Spectrum 7: The Best in Contemporary Fantastic Art	
2001	Arnie Fenner	Spectrum 7: The Best in Contemporary Fantastic Art	
2002	Jo Fletcher*	editing the Fantasy Masterworks series	
2002	Stephen Jones*	editing	
2002	Ellen Datlow	editing	
2002	Douglas E. Winter	Clive Barker: The Dark Fantastic	
2002	Randy Broecker	Fantasy of the 20th Century: An Illustrated History	
2003	Gordon Van Gelder*	The Magazine of Fantasy & Science Fiction	
2003	Paul Barnett	Paper Tiger art books	
2003	Ellen Datlow	editing	
2003	William K. Schafer	Subterranean Press	
2003	Gary Turner	Golden Gryphon Press	
2003	Marty Halpern	Golden Gryphon Press	
2003	Terri Windling	editing	
2004	Peter Crowther*	PS Publishing	
2004	John Howe	artwork in The Lord of the Rings	
2004	Alan Lee	artwork in The Lord of the Rings	
2004	Kelly Link	Small Beer Press	
2004	Gavin Grant	Small Beer Press	
2004	Sharyn November	Firebird Books	
2004	David Pringle	Interzone and services to the field	
2004	Sean Wallace	Prime Books	
2005	S. T. Joshi*	scholarship	
2005	Kelly Link	Small Beer Press	
2005	Gavin Grant	Small Beer Press	
2005	Sharyn November	editing	
2005	Gordon Van Gelder	The Magazine of Fantasy & Science Fiction	
2005	Terri Windling	editing	
2006	Sean Wallace*	Prime Books	
2006	Susan Allison	Ace Books	
2006	Ginjer Buchanan	Ace Books	
2006	Lou Anders	editing at Pyr	
2006	S. T. Joshi	Supernatural Literature of the World: An Encyclopedia	
2006	Stefan Dziemanowicz	Supernatural Literature of the World: An Encyclopedia	
2006	Peter Lavery	Pan MacMillan UK and Tor UK	
2006	Chris Roberson	MonkeyBrain Books	
2006	Allison Baker	MonkeyBrain Books	
2007	Ellen Asher*	work at Science Fiction Book Club	
2007	Mark Finn	Blood & Thunder: The Life & Art of Robert E. Howard	
2007	Deanna Hoak	copyediting	
2007	Greg Ketter	DreamHaven Books	
2007	Leonard S. Marcus	The Wand in the Word: Conversations with Writers of Fantasy	
2008	Peter Crowther*	PS Publishing	
2008	Chris Roberson	MonkeyBrain Books	
2008	Allison Baker	MonkeyBrain Books	
2008	Alan Beatts	Borderlands Books	
2008	Jude Feldman	Borderlands Books	
2008	Jeremy Lassen	Night Shade Books	
2008	Jason Williams	Night Shade Books	
2008	Shawna McCarthy	Realms of Fantasy	
2008	Gordon Van Gelder	The Magazine of Fantasy & Science Fiction	
2009	Kelly Link*	Small Beer Press and Big Mouth House	
2009	Gavin Grant*	Small Beer Press and Big Mouth House	
2009	Farah Mendlesohn	Rhetorics of Fantasy	
2009	Stephen H. Segal	Weird Tales	
2009	Ann VanderMeer	Weird Tales	
2009	Jerad Walters	A Lovecraft Retrospective: Artists Inspired by H.P. Lovecraft	
2009	Jacob Weisman	Tachyon Publications	
2010	Jonathan Strahan*	editing anthologies	
2010	Peter Crowther	PS Publishing	
2010	Nicky Crowther	PS Publishing	
2010	Ellen Datlow	editing anthologies	
2010	Hayao Miyazaki	Ponyo	
2010	Barbara Roden	Ash-Tree Press	
2010	Christopher Roden	Ash-Tree Press	
2010	Jacob Weisman	Tachyon Publications	
2010	Rina Weisman	Tachyon Publications	
2011	Marc Gascoigne*	Angry Robot	
2011	John Joseph Adams	editing and anthologies	
2011	Lou Anders	editing at Pyr	
2011	Stéphane Marsan	Bragelonne	
2011	Alain Névant	Bragelonne	
2011	Brett Alexander Savory	ChiZine Publications	
2011	Sandra Kasturi	ChiZine Publications	
2012	Eric Lane*	publishing in translation – Dedalus Books	
2012	Jo Fletcher	editing – Jo Fletcher Books	
2012	John Joseph Adams	editing – anthology and magazine	
2012	Brett Alexander Savory	ChiZine Publications	
2012	Sandra Kasturi	ChiZine Publications	
2012	Jeff VanderMeer	The Steampunk Bible	
2012	S. J. Chambers	The Steampunk Bible	
2013	Lucia Graves*	the translation of The Prisoner of Heaven by Carlos Ruiz Zafón	
2013	Brett Alexander Savory	ChiZine Publications	
2013	Sandra Kasturi	ChiZine Publications	
2013	Peter Crowther	PS Publishing	
2013	Nicky Crowther	PS Publishing	
2013	William K. Schafer	Subterranean Press	
2013	Adam Mills	Weird Fiction Review	
2013	Ann VanderMeer	Weird Fiction Review	
2013	Jeff VanderMeer	Weird Fiction Review	
2014	Irene Gallo*	art direction of Tor.com	
2014	William K. Schafer*	Subterranean Press	
2014	John Joseph Adams	magazine and anthology editing	
2014	Ginjer Buchanan	editing at Ace Books	
2014	Jeff VanderMeer	Wonderbook: The Illustrated Guide to Creating Imaginative Fiction	
2014	Jeremy Zerfoss	Wonderbook: The Illustrated Guide to Creating Imaginative Fiction	
2014	Jerad Walters	Centipede Press	
2015	Sandra Kasturi*	ChiZine Publications	
2015	Brett Alexander Savory*	ChiZine Publications	
2015	John Joseph Adams	editing anthologies and Nightmare and Fantasy magazines	
2015	Jeanne Cavelos	Odyssey Writing workshops	
2015	Gordon Van Gelder	The Magazine of Fantasy & Science Fiction	
2015	Jerad Walters	Centipede Press	
2016	Stephen Jones*	The Art of Horror	
2016	Joe Monti	contributions to the genre	
2016	Heather J. Wood	Gods, Memes and Monsters: A 21st Century Bestiary	
2016	Neil Gaiman	The Sandman: Overture	
2016	Dave Stewart	The Sandman: Overture	
2016	J. H. Williams III	The Sandman: Overture	
2016	Robert Jordan	The Wheel of Time Companion	
2016	Harriet McDougal	The Wheel of Time Companion	
2016	Alan Romanczuk	The Wheel of Time Companion	
2016	Maria Simons	The Wheel of Time Companion	
2017	Michael Levy*	Children's Fantasy Literature: An Introduction	
2017	Farah Mendlesohn*	Children's Fantasy Literature: An Introduction	
2017	L. Timmel Duchamp	Aqueduct Press	
2017	Charles Coleman Finlay	The Magazine of Fantasy & Science Fiction	
2017	Kelly Link	contributions to the genre	
2017	Joe Monti	contributions to the genre	
2018	Harry Brockway*	Writing Madness	
2018	Patrick McGrath*	Writing Madness	
2018	Danel Olson*	Writing Madness	
2018	Charles Coleman Finlay	The Magazine of Fantasy & Science Fiction	
2018	Irene Gallo	art direction at Tor Books and Tor.com	
2018	Greg Ketter	DreamHaven Books	
2018	Leslie S. Klinger	The New Annotated Frankenstein (W. W. Norton & Company)	
2019	Huw Lewis-Jones*	The Writer's Map: An Atlas of Imaginary Lands (The University of Chicago Press)	
2019	Molly Barton	Serial Box	
2019	Jeff Li	Serial Box	
2019	James Stuart	Serial Box	
2019	Julian Yap	Serial Box	
2019	Charles Coleman Finlay	The Magazine of Fantasy & Science Fiction	
2019	Irene Gallo	art direction at Tor Books and Tor.com	
2019	Catherine McIlwaine	Tolkien: Maker of Middle-earth exhibition	
2020	Ebony Elizabeth Thomas*	The Dark Fantastic: Race and the Imagination from Harry Potter to the Hunger Games (New York University Press)	
2020	Charles Coleman Finlay	The Magazine of Fantasy & Science Fiction	
2020	Leslie S. Klinger	The New Annotated H.P. Lovecraft: Beyond Arkham (Liveright)	
2020	Ellen Oh	We Need Diverse Books	
2020	Sheree Thomas	Contributions to the genre	
2021	Charles Coleman Finlay*	The Magazine of Fantasy & Science Fiction	
2021	Clive Bloom	The Palgrave Handbook of Contemporary Gothic (Palgrave Macmillan)	
2021	Jo Fletcher	Jo Fletcher Books	
2021	Maria Dahvana Headley	Beowulf: A New Translation (MCD x FSG Originals US/Scribe UK)	
2021	Jeffrey Andrew Weinstock	The Monster Theory Reader (University of Minnesota Press)	
2022	Marjorie Liu*	Monstress Volume Six: The Vow (Image Comics)	
2022	Sana Takeda*	Monstress Volume Six: The Vow (Image Comics)	
2022	Charlie Jane Anders	Never Say You Can't Survive (Tor.com Publishing)	
2022	Cam Collins	Old Gods of Appalachia (podcast)	
2022	Steve Shell	Old Gods of Appalachia (podcast)	
2022	Irene Gallo	Tor.com	
2022	William K. Schafer	Subterranean Press	
2022	Sheree Thomas	editing The Magazine of Fantasy & Science Fiction	
2023	Matt Ottley*	The Tree of Ecstasy and Unbearable Sadness (Dirt Lane Press)	
2023	Irene Gallo	Tor.com	
2023	Kelly Link	Small Beer Press	
2023	Gavin Grant	Small Beer Press	
2023	Tim Lebbon	Without Walls (PS Publishing)	
2023	Daniele Serra	Without Walls (PS Publishing)	
2023	Fiona Moore	Management Lessons from Game of Thrones: Organization Theory and Strategy in Westeros (Edward Elgar Publishing)	
2024	Liza Groen Trombi*	Locus	
2024	Bill Campbell	Rosarium Books	
2024	E. M. Carroll	A Guest in the House (First Second Books)	
2024	M. John Harrison	Wish I Was Here: An Anti-Memoir (Serpent's Tail)	
2024	Stephen Jones	The Weird Tales Boys (PS Publishing)	
2025	Sydney Paige Guerrero*	Mapping New Stars: A Sourcebook on Philippine Speculative Fiction (The University of the Philippines Press)	
2025	Gabriela Lee*	Mapping New Stars: A Sourcebook on Philippine Speculative Fiction (The University of the Philippines Press)	
2025	Anna Felicia Sanchez*	Mapping New Stars: A Sourcebook on Philippine Speculative Fiction (The University of the Philippines Press)	
2025	Hildur Knútsdóttir	The Night Guest audiobook (Nightfire)	
2025	Mary Robinette Kowal	The Night Guest audiobook (Nightfire)	
2025	David Thomas Moore	editorial work with Solaris Books/Rebellion Developments	
2025	Sheree Renée Thomas	The Magazine of Fantasy & Science Fiction	
2025	Jacob Weisman	Tachyon Publications	
2026	Clive Bloom*	London Uncanny: A Gothic Guide to the Capital in Weird History and Fiction (Bloomsbury Academic)	
2026	Jaymee Goh	Tachyon Publications	
2026	Jill Roberts	Tachyon Publications	
2026	Jacob Weisman	Tachyon Publications	
2026	Tim Lucas	Succubus (PS Publishing/Electric Dreamhouse)	
2026	Blumhouse Productions	Horror's New Wave: 15 Years of Blumhouse (Simon Element)	
2026	Dave Schilling	Horror's New Wave: 15 Years of Blumhouse (Simon Element)	
2026	Becky Siegel Spratford	Why I Love Horror: Essays on Horror Literature (Saga Press)	
2026	Richard Wolinsky	Space Ships! Ray Guns! Martian Octopods!: Interviews with Science Fiction Legends (Tachyon Publications)	

== See also ==
- World Fantasy Convention
