= The Best Horror of the Year: Volume Five =

2013 horror fiction anthology edited by Ellen Datlow

- Editor: Ellen Datlow
- Language: English
- Series: The Best Horror of the Year
- Genre: Horror
- Publisher: Night Shade Books
- Publication date: August 2013
- Publication place: United States
- Media type: Print (Paperback), eBook
- Pages: 406
- ISBN: 978-1-59780-475-2
- OCLC: 857301626
- Preceded by: The Best Horror of the Year: Volume Four
- Followed by: The Best Horror of the Year: Volume Six

The Best Horror of the Year: Volume Five (ISBN 978-1-59780-475-2) is a horror fiction anthology edited by Ellen Datlow that was published in August 2013. It is the fifth volume in The Best Horror of the Year series.

== Contents ==
The book includes twenty-eight horror stories, all first published in 2012. The book also includes a summation by Datlow, and a list of honorable mentions for the year. The stories are as follows:

- Lucy Taylor: "Nikishi"
- Dan Chaon: "Little America"
- Jeffrey Ford: "A Natural History of Autumn"
- Kij Johnson: "Mantis Wives"
- Stephanie Crawford and Duane Swierczynski: "Tender as Teeth"
- Ramsey Campbell: "The Callers"
- Kevin McCann: "Two Poems for Hill House" (poem)
- Terry Dowling: "Mariners' Round"
- Gemma Files: "Nanny Grey"
- Tamsyn Muir: "The Magician's Apprentice"
- Gary McMahon: "Kill All Monsters"
- Ian Rogers: "The House on Ashley Avenue"
- Jay Wilburn: "Dead Song"
- Sandi Leibowitz: "Sleeping, I Was Beauty" (poem)
- Margo Lanagan: "Bajazzle"
- Conrad Williams: "The Pike"
- Bruce McAllister: "The Crying Child"
- Amber Sparks: "This Circus the World"
- Gary McMahon: "Some Pictures in an Album"
- Nathan Ballingrud: "Wild Acre"
- Megan Arkenberg: "Final Exam"
- Stephen Bacon: "None So Blind"
- Priya Sharma: "The Ballad of Boomtown"
- Adam Nevill: "Pig Thing"
- Richard Gavin: "The Word-Made Flesh"
- Claire Massey: "Into the Penny Arcade"
- Lucy A. Snyder: "Magdala Amygdala"
- Laird Barron: "Frontier Death Song"
