= The Best Horror of the Year: Volume Six =

2014 horror fiction anthology edited by Ellen Datlow

- Editor: Ellen Datlow
- Language: English
- Series: The Best Horror of the Year
- Genre: Horror fiction
- Publisher: Night Shade Books
- Publication date: June 3, 2014
- Publication place: United States
- Media type: Print (Paperback)
- Pages: 448
- ISBN: 978-1-59780-503-2
- Preceded by: The Best Horror of the Year: Volume Five
- Followed by: The Best Horror of the Year: Volume Seven

The Best Horror of the Year: Volume Six (ISBN 978-1-59780-503-2) is a horror fiction anthology edited by Ellen Datlow that was published on June 3, 2014. It is the sixth in The Best Horror of the Year series.

== Contents ==
The book includes the following 24 works of short fiction, all first published in 2013:

- Stephen Bacon: "Apports"
- Dale Bailey: "Mr. Splitfoot"
- Nathan Ballingrud: "The Good Husband"
- Nina Allan: "The Tiger"
- Lynda E. Rucker: "The House on Cobb Street"
- K.J. Kabza: "The Soul in the Bell Jar"
- Steve Toase: "Call Out"
- Robert Shearman: "That Tiny Flutter of the Heart I Used to Call Love"
- Ray Cluley: "Bones of Crow"
- Jeannine Hall Gailey: "Introduction to the Body in Fairy Tales"
- Conrad Williams: "The Fox"
- Simon Clark: "The Tin House"
- Simon Strantzas: "Stemming the Tide"
- Priya Sharma: "The Anatomist’s Mnemonic"
- Steve Rasnic Tem: "The Monster Makers"
- Kim Newman: "The Only Ending We Have"
- Derek Künsken: "The Dog’s Paw"
- Lee Thomas: "Fine in the Fire"
- Jane Jakeman: "Majorlena"
- Tim Casson: "The Withering"
- Neil Gaiman: "Down to a Sunless Sea"
- Laird Barron: "Jaws of Saturn"
- Linda Nagata: "Halfway Home"
- Brian Hodge: "The Same Deep Waters as You"
