= The Best Horror of the Year: Volume Two =

2010 horror fiction anthology edited by Ellen Datlow

- Editor: Ellen Datlow
- Language: English
- Series: The Best Horror of the Year
- Genre: Horror
- Publisher: Night Shade Books
- Publication date: March 10, 2010
- Publication place: United States
- Media type: Print (Paperback)
- Pages: 308
- ISBN: 978-1-59780-173-7 (TP)
- OCLC: 473467434
- Preceded by: The Best Horror of the Year: Volume One
- Followed by: The Best Horror of the Year: Volume Three

The Best Horror of the Year: Volume Two (ISBN 978-1-59780-173-7) is a horror fiction anthology edited by Ellen Datlow that was published on March 10, 2010. It is the second in The Best Horror of the Year series.

== Contents ==
The book includes 17 stories, all but one first published in 2009 (one included story, by Micaela Morrissette, was first published in the November/December 2008 issue of Weird Tales). The book also includes a summation by Datlow, and a list of honorable mentions for the year. The stories are as follows:

- Suzy McKee Charnas: "Lowland Sea"
- Steve Eller: "The End of Everything"
- Reggie Oliver: "Mrs. Midnight"
- Gemma Files & Stephen J. Barringer: "each thing i show you is a piece of my death"
- Glen Hirshberg: "The Nimble Men"
- Michael Marshall Smith: "What Happens When You Wake Up in the Night"
- Micaela Morrissette: "Wendigo"
- Norman Prentiss: "In the Porches of My Ears"
- Stephen Graham Jones: "Lonegan's Luck"
- Dale Bailey & Nathan Ballingrud: "The Crevasse"
- Steve Duffy: "The Lion's Den"
- Edward Morris: "Lotophagi"
- Kaaron Warren: "The Gaze Dogs of Nine Waterfall"
- Carole Johnstone: "Dead Loss"
- Laird Barron: "Strappado"
- Nina Allan: "The Lammas Worm"
- John Langan: "Technicolor"
