= The Best Horror of the Year: Volume Four =

2012 horror fiction anthology edited by Ellen Datlow

- Editor: Ellen Datlow
- Language: English
- Series: The Best Horror of the Year
- Genre: Horror
- Publisher: Night Shade Books
- Publication date: May 1, 2012
- Publication place: United States
- Media type: Print (Paperback) & eBook
- Pages: 308
- ISBN: 978-1-59780-399-1 (TP) & 978-1-59780-416-5 (ebook)
- OCLC: 769472709
- Preceded by: The Best Horror of the Year: Volume Three
- Followed by: The Best Horror of the Year: Volume Five

The Best Horror of the Year: Volume Four is a horror fiction anthology edited by Ellen Datlow that was published on May 1, 2012. It is the fourth in The Best Horror of the Year series.

== Contents ==
The book includes 18 stories, all first published in 2011. The book also includes a summation by Datlow of 2011 publications in the horror fiction market, and a list of honorable mentions for the year. The stories are as follows:

- Stephen King: "The Little Green God of Agony"
- Leah Bobet: "Stay"
- Simon Bestwick: "The Moraine"
- Laird Barron: "Blackwood's Baby"
- David Nickle: "Looker"
- Priya Sharma: "The Show"
- Margo Lanagan: "Mulberry Boys"
- Brian Hodge: "Roots and All"
- A. C. Wise: "Final Girl Theory"
- Livia Llewellyn: "Omphalos"
- Simon Bestwick: "Dermot"
- Alison Littlewood: "Black Feathers"
- Chet Williamson: "Final Verse"
- Terry Lamsley: "In the Absence of Murdock"
- Glen Hirshberg: "You Become the Neighborhood"
- John Langan: "In Paris, in the Mouth of Kronos"
- Anna Taborska: "Little Pig"
- Peter Straub: "The Ballad of Ballard and Sandrine"

== Reception ==
Mario Guslandi at the SF Site calls the anthology "a book well worth reading," though "not everyting is quite 'the best.'" He notes that "[m]ost of the included material was already part of my own, private 'year's best' and I was pleased to find it included therein." These include the stories by Hodge ("extraordinary, insightful"), Bobet ("creepy, atmospheric"), King ("very horrific, vivid"), Taborska ("adrenaline-rising") and Lamsley ("weird, superb"), which are singled out for particular praise, as are "a few outstanding stories which had escaped my radar and that I enjoyed very much, including those by Bestwick ("the very best tory in the book"), Barron ("extremely dark"), and Llewellyn ("a story of terrible beauty"). Other stories "failed to impress me the first time and still don't, despite the inclusion by Datlow in the present anthology."

The book was also reviewed by Stefan Dziemianowicz in Locus #618, July 2012.
