= Sybil's Garage =

- Editor: Matthew Kressel
- Categories: speculative fiction, poetry, and art
- Publisher: Matthew Kressel
- Founder: Matthew Kressel and Devin Poore
- Founded: 2003
- Final issue: 2010
- Company: Senses Five Press
- Country: United States
- Based in: Hoboken, New Jersey
- Language: English
- Website: www.sensesfive.com
- ISSN: 1557-9735

Sybil's Garage was a speculative fiction, poetry, and art journal, published by Senses Five Press. Issues one through six were released as a small press magazine, or zine. Issue seven was released in trade paperback format. The publication combines artwork with fiction and poetry for a unique aesthetic. The majority of the stories have tended toward slipstream fiction (see interstitial art), but some stories fall into traditional genres such as science fiction, fantasy, and horror fiction. Above each story is the author's suggested musical accompaniment, thus adding to the magazine's intended effect of engaging multiple senses. Sybil's Garage was founded in 2003 by Matthew Kressel and Devin Poore of Hoboken, New Jersey as an experiment in creating their own zine. In May 2007 issues one through four were entered into the permanent collection of the Hoboken Historical Museum. Issue No. 7 was pre-released at Readercon, the conference on imaginative literature, on July 9, 2010. The issue was released officially on July 21, 2010.

== Honors and awards ==
Richard Larson's "The Noise," from Sybil's Garage No. 7, will be published in Wilde Stories 2011: The Year's Best Gay Speculative Fiction.

In April 2010, three stories from Sybil's Garage No. 6 received honorable mentions in Best Horror of the Year, Vol 2, edited by Ellen Datlow. They are Toiya Kristen Finley's "Eating Ritual," James B. Pepe's "I Am Enkidu, His Wild Brother," and Genevieve Valentine's "The Drink of Fine Gentlemen Everywhere." In addition, for the same issue, the poems "City of Bridges" by J. E. Stanley and "God’s Cat" by Lyn C. A. Gardner were nominated for Rhysling Awards in the Short Poem Category. Simon Petrie's "Downdraft" was nominated for New Zealand's Sir Julius Vogel Award.

Stories from Sybil's Garage received honorable mentions in both the 2006 and 2007 editions of the Year's Best Fantasy and Horror, edited by Ellen Datlow, Kelly Link, and Gavin Grant. In the 2007 edition (page xxxviii), praise is given to Eric Gregory's story, "The Redaction of Flight 5766," and poems by Bobbi Sinha-Morey and Ed Lynskey. JoSelle Vanderhooft's poem, "The Tale of the Desert in the Rain," is given an honorable mention on page 468. All works listed here appeared in issue three.

== Editors and staff ==
Matthew Kressel is the editor-in-chief and publisher of Sybil's Garage. For issue seven, associate editors included Paul M. Berger, Alaya Dawn Johnson, Rajan Khanna, Devin Poore, Mercurio D. Rivera, and Greer Woodward.

== Trivia ==
=== Issue No. 6 ===
The scarecrow on the cover of issue six is a real scarecrow photographed in a pumpkin field in New Paltz, New York. The subway station in the background is the Brooklyn-based G-train India Street (Greenpoint Avenue) station, symbolizing the move of Senses Five Press from Hoboken, New Jersey to Greenpoint, New York.

The intertextual "handwritten" notes in the margins of issue six reference work by Gary Numan and Tubway Army on their album Replicas.

=== Issue No. 5 ===
The remote control on the cover of issue five is the remote that editor Matthew Kressel still uses for his television. The tentacle and the mushroom were created with the 3D modeling software Poser. The woman on the TV is associate editor Alaya Dawn Johnson's sister, Lauren, singing at a karaoke bar in Manhattan. This image was originally intended for the cover. In addition, the cover would feature a miniature galaxy floating in mid-air, spewing out the authors names in a spiral. Ultimately, however, the aspect ratio and contrast made the image unsuitable as the primary image.

Randomly sprinkled throughout issue five are quotes from the 1983 concept album Dazzle Ships by Orchestral Manoeuvres in the Dark. Many of the quotes are from the tracks "Genetic Engineering" and "ABC Auto Industry." The time 9:16 above the table of contents refers to the last stated time in the track "Time Zones," where recorded voices speak the exact time in multiple languages. The bar code under the quotes on page 71 is the same bar code on the back of the issue.

=== Issue No. 4 ===
"Sybil's Garage" appears translated into several languages throughout issue number four. The red characters painted on the side of the building on the cover say "Sybil's Garage" in Japanese. A close phonetic approximation is "SHI-BO-RU NO GA-RA-JE." Other languages that appear throughout the issue are Russian, Greek, German, Korean, Hawaiian, Portuguese, Spanish, Chinese, Hebrew, Arabic and Italian.

The cover photograph for issue four was taken in Hoboken, NJ. The plant leaning out the window is a ten-year-old spider plant still living in Matthew Kressel's apartment. The leaping fish is a marlin, and the planet in the background is Jupiter. The empty store in the photograph is now occupied by a company that sells "joke" shirts. The leaping marlin was inspired by the Hoboken fish store, Joseph Apicella & Sons, which had a huge metal sign in front of their shop of a leaping marlin. Due to lack of customers, the fish specialty store closed in Spring of 2007.

On the acknowledgments page of issue four is a vertical strip of text that begins, "You should. You should quit..." The quote is from the Richard Linklater film Slacker where an anonymous man walks into a coffee shop and is admonished by a psychotic stranger sipping coffee.

In issue No. 3, on the page after the table of contents and also page 70, a silhouetted man and woman play chess. The quotes above their heads reiterate the last two moves of the famous immortal game of 1851 between Adolf Anderssen and Lionel Kieseritzky. The game was honored in the movie Blade Runner, and the quotes in Sybil's Garage are taken verbatim from the film, reiterating one of the aesthetics of Sybil's Garage, the merger of the old and the new (a strong theme in the film as well). In Sybil's Garage, the woman wins the game.

=== Issue No. 3 ===
The cover image for issue No. 3 was modified from an actual photo of Devin J. Poore's grandfather's garage in Columbus, Indiana. The original photo can be seen on page 69 of issue No. 3. In early 2006, at a party, writer Mercurio D. Rivera attempted to call the phone number on the door of the pick-up truck. The phone rang, but no one answered.

The rusty, shanty-looking photo on page 10 of issue No. 3 is actually the rear of the Hoboken Ferry Terminal, which according to the NY Waterway's website transports over 24,000 passengers daily.

=== Issue No. 2 ===
On the cover of issue No. 2, small print reads "Sounds of odd literature with sounds," which is a paraphrase of text on the Man or Astro-Man? album, Project Infinity, which reads, "Sounds of man in space with sounds." The mandolins on the cover of issue No. 2 were taken from an image in a Sears Roebuck catalog circa 1910. At the top of the table of contents for the same issue is musical notation of a Bach composition adapted for the mandolin.

Matthew Kressel drew the shoelace on the top of page 3 of issue No. 2. Many of the images in that issue were taken from a hand-made, autographed book of engravings entitled Prelude to a Million Years by Lynd Ward, copy 102 of 920, generously donated by David Crane.

== Published authors ==
Sybil's Garage has published notable authors including Bruce Boston, Bruce Holland Rogers, William Shunn, Bram Stoker Award winning author Lee Thomas, Richard Bowes, Steve Rasnic Tem, Paul Tremblay, Yoon Ha Lee, K. Tempest Bradford, Samantha Henderson, Kris Dikeman, Lauren McLaughlin, and Mercurio D. Rivera. They have also published interviews with slipstream fiction writer Kelly Link, multiple award-winning author Jeffrey Ford, and Hoboken historian Jim Hans.

A full index of Sybil's Garage contributors can be found here.

== Etymology of the magazine's title ==
While Devin Poore and Matthew Kressel were walking through the streets of Hoboken in early 2003, trying to come up with a name for the zine, Matthew suggested Sybil's Cave, a Hoboken landmark. Devin replied, in response to the rapid urban sprawl of the area, that "It's probably a garage by now." Thus the name was born. Devin Poore wrote a detailed essay on the creation of the magazine in Sybil's Garage No. 2.

== ISSN ==
Registered as ISSN 1557-9735 with the United States Library of Congress.

== See also ==
- Science fiction magazine
- Fantasy fiction magazine
- Horror fiction magazine
