= The Best Horror of the Year: Volume Three =

2011 horror fiction anthology edited by Ellen Datlow

- Editor: Ellen Datlow
- Language: English
- Series: The Best Horror of the Year
- Genre: Horror fiction
- Publisher: Night Shade Books
- Publication date: June 1, 2011
- Publication place: United States
- Media type: Print (Paperback) & eBook
- Pages: 361
- ISBN: 978-1-59780-217-8 (TP) & 978-1-59780-326-7 (ebook)
- OCLC: 701014685
- Preceded by: The Best Horror of the Year: Volume Two
- Followed by: The Best Horror of the Year: Volume Four

The Best Horror of the Year: Volume Three (ISBN 978-1-59780-217-8) is a horror fiction anthology edited by Ellen Datlow that was published on June 1, 2011. It is the third in The Best Horror of the Year series.

== Contents ==
The book includes 21 stories and one poem, all first published in 2010. The book includes a summation by Datlow of 2010 publications in the horror fiction market, and a list of honorable mentions for the year. The stories are as follows:

- Cody Goodfellow: "At the Riding School"
- Reggie Oliver: "Mr. Pigsny"
- John Langan: "City of the Dog"
- Brian Hodge: "Just Outside Our Windows, Deep Inside Our Walls"
- Norman Partridge: "Lesser Demons"
- Karina Sumner-Smith: "When the Zombies Win"
- Laird Barron: "--30--"
- Mark Morris: "Fallen Boys"
- M. Rickert: "Was She Wicked? Was She Good?"
- Richard Harland: "The Fear"
- Stephen Graham Jones: "Till the Morning Comes"
- Glen Hirshberg: "Shomer"
- Christopher Fowler: "Oh I Do Like to Be Beside the Seaside"
- Nicholas Royle: "The Obscure Bird"
- Richard Christian Matheson: "Transfiguration"
- Catherynne M. Valente: "The Days of Flaming Motorcycles"
- Joe R. Lansdale: "The Folding Man"
- Joseph S. Pulver, Sr.: "Just Another Desert Night with Blood" (poem)
- Tanith Lee: "Black and White Sky"
- Ray Cluley: "At Night, When the Demons Come"
- John Langan: "The Revel"
