= The Best Horror of the Year: Volume One =

2009 horror fiction anthology edited by Ellen Datlow

- First cover
- Editor: Ellen Datlow
- Illustrator: Santiago Caruso
- Language: English
- Series: The Best Horror of the Year
- Genre: Horror
- Publisher: Night Shade Books
- Publication date: January 1, 2009
- Publication place: United States
- Media type: Print (Paperback), eBook
- Pages: 321
- ISBN: 978-1-59780-161-4 (TP) & 978-1-59780-241-3 (ebook)
- OCLC: 377705179
- Followed by: The Best Horror of the Year: Volume Two

The Best Horror of the Year: Volume One is a horror fiction anthology edited by Ellen Datlow that was published on January 1, 2009. It is the first in The Best Horror of the Year series.

== Contents ==
The book includes 21 stories, all first published in 2008. The book also includes a summation by Datlow, and a list of honorable mentions for the year. The stories are as follows:

- Richard Bowes: "If Angels Fight"
- Steve Duffy: "The Clay Party"
- William Browning Spencer: "Penguins of the Apocalypse"
- Glen Hirshberg: "Esmeralda"
- Trent Hergenrader: "The Hodag"
- Nicholas Royle: "Very Low-Flying Aircraft"
- Margaret Ronald: "When the Gentlemen Go By"
- Laird Barron: "The Lagerstätte"
- Euan Harvey: "Harry and the Monkey"
- Miranda Siemienowicz: "Dress Circle"
- Daniel Kaysen: "The Rising River"
- JoSelle Vanderhooft: "Sweeney Among the Straight Razors"
- R. B. Russell: "Loup-garou"
- Graham Edwards: "Girl in Pieces"
- Joe R. Lansdale: "It Washed Up"
- Mike Allen: "The Thirteenth Hell"
- Margo Lanagan: "The Goosle"
- Daniel LeMoal: "Beach Head"
- Adam Golaski: "The Man from the Peak"
- Simon Bestwick: "The Narrows"
