= John Langan =

American horror writer (born 1969)

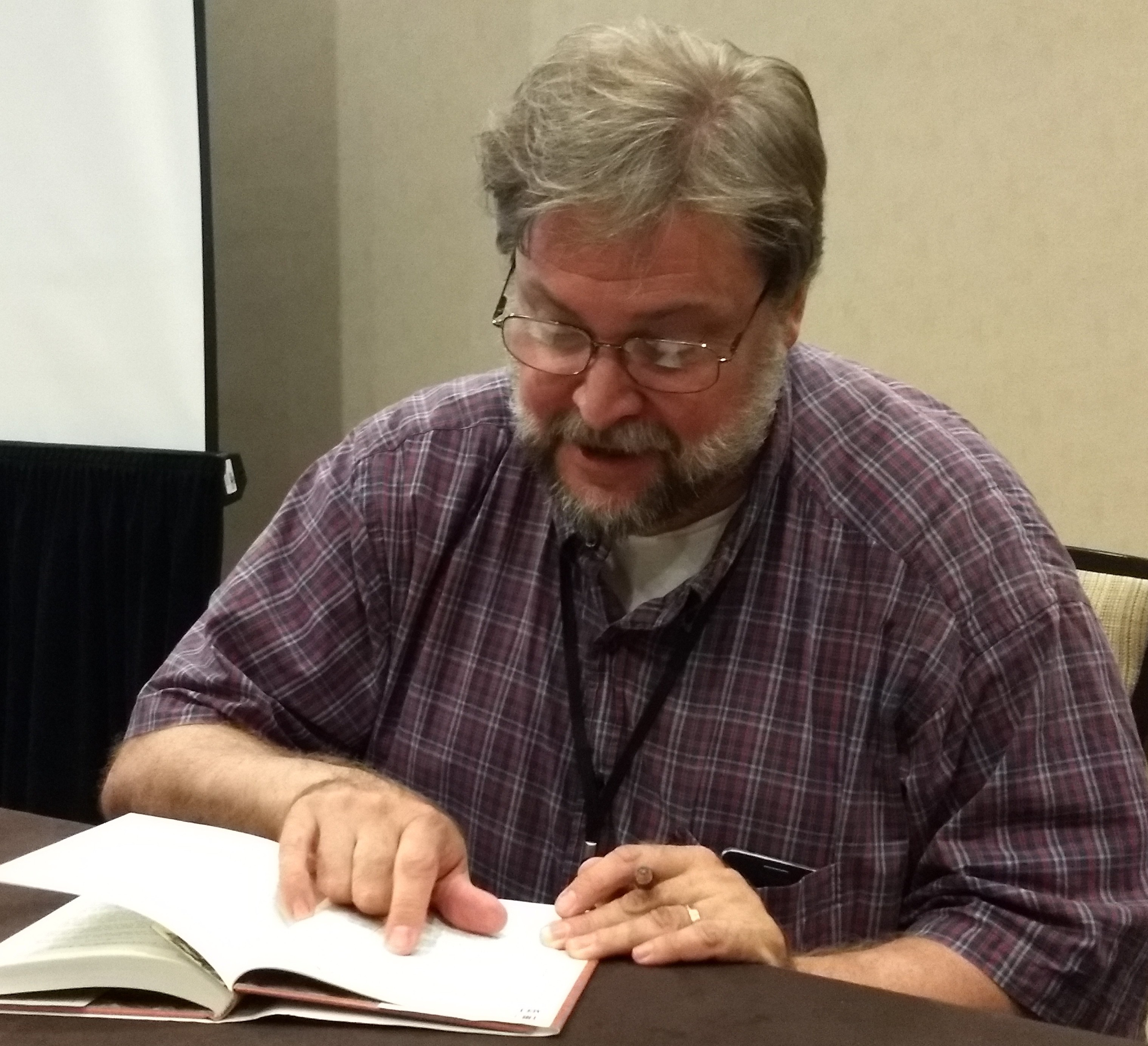
- Photo of John Langan in 2019
- Born: July 6, 1969 (age 57); United States
- Education: MFA
- Alma mater: CUNY Graduate Center; State University of New York at New Paltz
- Occupations: Author, novelist, short story writer, professor
- Children: 3
- Writing career
- Language: English
- Genres: Horror fiction, Science fiction, Dark fantasy, New Weird, weird fiction
- Notable works: Mr. Gaunt and Other Uneasy Encounters; House of Windows; The Fisherman; Thirty Years of Monster Stories
- Notable awards: Finalist Horror Guild Award, 2008 Bram Stoker Award Nominee for Best Collection
- Website: johnpaullangan.wordpress.com

John Langan (born July 6, 1969) is an American author and writer of contemporary horror. Langan has been a finalist for International Horror Guild Award. In 2008, he was a Bram Stoker Award nominee for Best Collection, and in 2016, a Bram Stoker Award winner for his novel The Fisherman. He is on the board of directors for the Shirley Jackson Awards.

== Biography ==
John Langan received his Masters of Arts degree from State University of New York at New Paltz and his Master of Philosophy from the Graduate Center of the City University of New York. He was an instructor at State University of New York at New Paltz, where he taught creative writing and gothic fiction, between 2000 and 2018. He was also an adjunct professor at Marist College. Currently, he lives in upstate New York with his wife, two sons, and cat.

His fiction has appeared in The Magazine of Fantasy & Science Fiction and the anthologies Poe and The Living Dead. His first collection, Mr. Gaunt and Other Uneasy Encounters, was published by Prime Books; his first novel, House of Windows, was published by Night Shade Books. In the novel acknowledgements he writes “This book had a hard time finding a home: the genre people weren’t happy with all the literary stuff; the literary people weren’t happy with all the genre stuff.”

== Bibliography ==
=== Novels ===
- House of Windows (2009)
- The Fisherman (2016)

=== Collections ===
- Mr. Gaunt and Other Uneasy Encounters (2008)
- The Wide Carnivorous Sky and Other Monstrous Geographies (2013)
- Sefira and Other Betrayals (2019)
- Children of the Fang and Other Genealogies (2020)
- Corpsemouth and Other Autobiographies (2022)
- Lost In the Dark and Other Excursions (2025)

=== Anthologies ===
- Creatures: Thirty Years of Monsters (2011) with Paul G. Tremblay

=== Included in anthologies ===
- “Altered Beast, Altered Me”, in Final Cuts: New Tales of Hollywood Horror and Other Spectacles (2020)
- “Natalia, Queen of the Hungry Dogs”, in Echos: The Saga Anthology of Ghost Stories (2019)
- “The Deep Sea Swell”, in The Devil and the Deep: Horror Stories of the Sea” (2018)
- “Lost in the Dark”, in Haunted Nights (2017)
- "Ymir", in Children of Old Leech: A Tribute to the Carnivorous Cosmos of Laird Barron (2014)
- "Sweetums", in A Season In Carcosa (2012)
- "In Paris, in the Mouth of Kronos", in The Best Horror of the Year: Volume Four (2012)
- "City of the Dog", in The Best Horror of the Year: Volume Three (2011)
- "Technicolor", in The Best Horror of the Year: Volume Two (2010)
- "The Shallows", in Cthulhu's Reign (2010) and The Book of Cthulhu (2011)
- "Mr. Gaunt", in New Cthulhu: The Recent Weird (2011)
- "Episode Seven: Last Stand Against the Pack in the Kingdom of the Purple Flowers", in Wastelands: Stories of the Apocalypse (2008)
- "Anchor", in Autumn Cthulhu (2016)

=== Short fiction ===
- "On Skua Island" (2001)
- "Mr. Gaunt" (2002)
- "Tutorial" (2003)
- "Episode Seven: Last Stand Against the Pack in the Kingdom of Purple Flowers" (2007)
- "Kids" (2008)
- "How the Day Runs Down" (2008)
- "Laocoön, or, The Singularity" (2008)
- "Technicolor" (2009)
- "The Wide, Carnivorous Sky" (2009)
- "City of the dog". F&SF. 118 (1&2): 222–256. January–February 2010.
- "The Shallows" (2010)
- "The Revel" (2010)
- "In Paris, in the Mouth of Kronos" (2011)
- "The Unbearable Proximity of Mr. Dunn's Balloons" (2011)
- "The Third Always Beside You" (2011)
- "Renfrew's Course" (2012)
- "Bloom" (2012)
- "Sweetums" (2012)
- "Hyphae" (2012)
- "With Max Barry in the Nearer Precincts" (2013)
- "Mother of Stone" (2013)
- "June, 1987. Hitchhiking, Mr. Norris" (2013)
- "Children of the Fang" (2014)
- "Episode Three: On the Great Plains, in the Snow" (2014)
- "To See, to Be Seen" (2016)

=== Essays ===
- "Letter" (Weird Tales, Winter 2001–02) (2001)
- "Sailing the True Void: H. P. Lovecraft un Fritz Leiber's THE WANDERER" (2004)
- "Strange Stories" (2007)
- "Metaphysical Labyrinths and Fairy-Tale Archetypes" (2007)
- "Domination of Black" (2007)
- "Open Mouths, Ready to Feed" (2007)
- "Boxing Lessons in a Bar: An Appreciation of Lucius Shepard" (2007)
- ""Feed Me, Baby, Feed Me": Beyond the Pleasure Principle in Fritz Leiber's "Girl with the Hungry Eyes"" (2008)
- "Sympathy for Ig" (2010)
- "The H Word: Choosing Gruesome Subjects" (2013)
- "The Whirlpool: With Howard and Eudora on the Banks of the Perdido" (2014)

== Awards ==
Year	Award	Category	Work	Result	Ref.
2001	International Horror Guild Award	Long Fiction	On Skua Island	Nominated	
2002	International Horror Guild Award	Long Form	Mr. Gaunt	Nominated	
2008	Bram Stoker Award	Fiction Collection	Mr. Gaunt and Other Uneasy Encounters	Nominated	-
2009	Locus Award	Collection	Mr. Gaunt and Other Uneasy Encounters	Nominated	
2010	Locus Award	Novella	The Wide, Carnivorous Sky	Nominated	
2010	Locus Award	Novelette	Technicolor	Nominated	
2015	Locus Award	Novella	Children of the Fang	Nominated	
2016	Bram Stoker Award	Novel	The Fisherman	Won	-
2017	Locus Award	Horror Novel	The Fisherman	Nominated	
2019	Bram Stoker Award	Fiction Collection	Sefira and Other Betrayals	Nominated	-
2020	Bram Stoker Award	Fiction Collection	Children of the Fang and Other Genealogies	Nominated	-
2023	Locus Award	Collection	Corpsemouth and Other Autobiographies	Nominated	
2025	Bram Stoker Award	Collection	Lost in The Dark and Other Excursions	Won	
