= Lucy A. Snyder =

American novelist

- Born: 1971 (age 54–55); South Carolina, U.S.
- Citizenship: U.S.
- Writing career
- Genre: Speculative fiction
- Notable works: Soft Apocalypses, Installing Linux on a Dead Badger, Shooting Yourself in the Head For Fun and Profit: A Writer's Survival Guide, "Magdala Amygdala"
- Notable awards: Bram Stoker Award; Fiction Collection; 2014 Soft Apocalypses; Non-Fiction; 2014 Shooting Yourself in the Head For Fun and Profit: A Writer's Survival Guide; Short Fiction; 2012 Magdala Amygdala; Poetry Collection; 2014 Chimeric Machines
- Website: www.lucysnyder.com

Lucy A. Snyder (born 1971) is an American science fiction, fantasy, humor, horror, and non-fiction writer.

== Biography ==
Born in South Carolina, Snyder grew up in San Angelo, Texas, after her father was briefly assigned to Goodfellow Air Force Base. She graduated from Angelo State University and then moved to Bloomington, Indiana, for graduate studies in environmental science and journalism at Indiana University Bloomington. She is a graduate of the 1995 Clarion Workshop; authors Nalo Hopkinson and Kelly Link were among her classmates.

She lives in Columbus, Ohio, formerly with her now ex-husband and occasional coauthor Gary A. Braunbeck.

== Writings ==
Over 80 of her short stories have appeared in various magazines, anthologies, and collections, including Apex Magazine, Nightmare Magazine, Pseudopod, Escape Pod and Short Trips: Destination Prague. One of her online humor stories, "Installing Linux on a Dead Badger", became the basis for a short humor collection of the same name published in 2007. Her 2012 horror story "Magdala Amygdala" won the Bram Stoker Award for Best Short Fiction and was selected to appear in The Best Horror of the Year: Volume Five (edited by Ellen Datlow). This story later served as the basis for her 2023 novel Sister, Maiden, Monster.

Her poetry has appeared in Lady Churchill's Rosebud Wristlet, GUD Magazine and Weird Tales. In March 2010, Snyder was awarded a Bram Stoker Award for Superior Achievement in Poetry for her collection Chimeric Machines.

Snyder served as an editor for HMS Beagle, an online bioscience publication produced by Elsevier, and briefly served as a contributing editor for Strange Horizons. Since January 2010, she has mentored students in Seton Hill University's MFA program in Writing Popular Fiction.

== Awards ==
Year	Title	Award	Category	Result
2009	Chimeric Machines	Bram Stoker Award	Poetry Collection	Won
2010	Spellbent	Bram Stoker Award	First Novel	Nominated
2010	Spellbent	Locus Award	First Novel	Nom (10th)
2012	"Magdala Amygdala"	Bram Stoker Award	Short Fiction	Won
2014	Shooting Yourself in the Head for Fun and Profit	Bram Stoker Award	Non-Fiction	Won
2014	Soft Apocalypses	Bram Stoker Award	Fiction Collection	Won
2015	While the Black Stars Burn	Bram Stoker Award	Fiction Collection	Won
2018	Garden of Eldritch Delights	Bram Stoker Award	Fiction Collection	Nominated
2018	Garden of Eldritch Delights	Shirley Jackson Award	Collection	Nominated
2019	Chiral Mad 4: An Anthology of Collaborations	Shirley Jackson Award	Anthology	Nominated
2021	Exposed Nerves	Bram Stoker Award	Poetry Collection	Nominated
2022	Exposed Nerves	Elgin Awards	Book	Nominated

== Bibliography ==
=== Novels ===
- —— (2009). Spellbent (1st h ed.). Del Rey Books.
- —— (2010). Shotgun Sorceress (1st h ed.). Del Rey Books.
- —— (2011). Switchblade Goddess (1st hrd ed.). Del Rey Books.
- —— (2015). Devils' Field (1st hrd ed.). Alliteration Ink.
- —— (2023). Sister, Maiden, Monster (1st h ed.). Tor Nightfire.

=== Serials ===
- A Glimpse of Darkness (Del Rey Books, 2010, co-written with Lara Adrian, Harry Connolly, Kelly Meding, and Stacia Kane)

=== Collections ===
- Blood Magic (2001)
- Sparks and Shadows (2007)
- Installing Linux on a Dead Badger (2007)
- Chimeric Machines (2009)
- Orchid Carousals (2013)
- Soft Apocalypses (2014)
- While the Black Stars Burn (2015)
- Garden of Eldritch Delights (2018)
- Halloween Season (2020)
- Exposed Nerves (2021)

=== Nonfiction books ===
- Shooting Yourself in the Head for Fun and Profit: A Writer's Survival Guide (2014)

== Sources ==
- Burgess, Liz: "Technomancy and the Zombie Apocalypse", Sequential Tart, July 9, 2007.
