= Matthew Kressel =

American novelist

- Citizenship: United States
- Occupations: Writer & Full-Stack Developer
- Writing career
- Language: English
- Genres: Fantasy, science fiction
- Notable works: King of Shards, "The Sounds of Old Earth"
- Website: www.matthewkressel.net

Matthew Kressel is a multiple Nebula, World Fantasy Award, and Eugie Award nominated author and coder. His short stories have been published in Reactor, io9, Lightspeed, Clarkesworld Magazine, Beneath Ceaseless Skies, Interzone, Apex Magazine, and many other magazines and anthologies. His first novel King of Shards was released in 2015.

As a coder, he created the Moksha submissions system, a manuscript submissions system in use by some of the largest speculative fiction publishers today. He is the founder of the speculative fiction magazine Sybil's Garage and the publishing house Senses Five Press. Currently he is a member of the Altered Fluid writing group and the co-host of the Fantastic Fiction at KGB reading series in Manhattan.

== Life ==
Kressel grew up on Long Island in a conservative Jewish family. He currently lives in Brooklyn.

Kressel worked in downtown Manhattan during the September 11 attacks. He said that prior to the attack he used to "look up at the World Trade Center towers on my way to work and think, 'Those are our pyramids. They’ll be here in a thousand years.' A few weeks later, from that same street, I watched them crumble and was running with a thousand screaming people away from a debris cloud rapidly chasing us. If ever there was a message on the impermanence of things."

== Writing ==
Kressel's first novel, King of Shards, was published in 2015. In a review on NPR the novel was called “Majestic, resonant, reality-twisting madness.”

Kessel's short stories have been published in a number of magazines including Lightspeed, Clarkesworld Magazine, Analog Science Fiction and Fact, Beneath Ceaseless Skies, Interzone, Apex Magazine, Electric Velocipede, and Nightmare Magazine. Anthologies including his stories are Mad Hatters and March Hares, Naked City, After, and The People of the Book. His stories have been translated into Chinese, Russian, Czech, Polish, French, Spanish, Croatian, and Romanian.

Kressel's short story "The Sounds of Old Earth" was a finalist for the 2013 Nebula Award for Best Short Story while his story "The Meeker and the All-Seeing Eye" was a finalist in the same category in 2013. His story "The Last Novelist (Or a Dead Lizard in the Yard)" was a finalist in the same category in 2017, and was a finalist for the 2018 Eugie Foster Memorial Award. His short stories have also been named to the Locus Recommended Reading List.

Kressel co-hosts with Ellen Datlow the Fantastic Fiction reading series at the KGB Bar in New York City.

== Coding ==
Kressel created the Moksha submissions system in late 2011 after editor John Joseph Adams approached him about using the online submissions system he had created for his work publishing and editing his speculative fiction magazine Sybil's Garage. Adams requested many features that were not in the original version, so Kressel opted to build a new system from scratch. Adams began using Moksha for his publications, including Lightspeed and Nightmare Magazine, in early 2012.

Since that time Moksha has grown to serve many publishers, including Reactor, The Magazine of Fantasy & Science Fiction, Strange Horizons, Lightspeed, Nightmare Magazine, Apex Book Company, Escape Pod, and many others.

== Editing ==
In 2003 Kressel co-founded the speculative fiction magazine Sybil's Garage, In 2011 Kressel was nominated for World Fantasy Award in the category of Special Award, Non-Professional for editing Sybil's Garage.

Kressel also founded Senses Five Press through which he published Paper Cities: An Anthology of Urban Fantasy edited by Ekaterina Sedia, which won the 2009 World Fantasy Award for Best Anthology.
