= Centipede Press =

Independent book publisher

- Founded: 2001
- Founder: Jerad Walters
- Country of origin: United States
- Headquarters location: Lakewood, Colorado
- Distribution: Consortium Book Sales
- Publication types: Books, Journals
- Fiction genres: Horror, Gothic, science fiction, weird, crime, thriller, abnormal psychology
- Official website: centipedepress.com

Centipede Press is an American independent book and periodical publisher focusing on horror, weird tales, crime narratives, science fiction, gothic novels, fantasy art, and studies of literature, music and film. Its earliest imprints were Cocytus Press and Millipede Press.

== Background ==
Centipede Press was founded in 2001 in Lakewood, Colorado by Jerad Walters. Since inception, it has published over two hundred volumes including currently well-known authors (including Stephen King, Peter Straub, Richard Adams, John Fowles, Neil Gaiman, Frank Herbert, and Patrick McGrath), as well as resurrecting out-of-print works of past genre writers. As of 2025, the press releases one to three new books a month, principally in luxury or oversized, signed or traycased hardback editions aimed toward the collector's market.

Centipede Press received the Horror Writers Association Specialty Press Award in 2013, with its other volumes being named finalists in other years for the Bram Stoker Award in Non-fiction twice and once for Fiction Collection, the Locus award for Single-Author Story Collection, and World Fantasy Award for Best Multiple-Author Anthology (from its first released book, World Fantasy Award for Stigmata in 2001). In 2018, the World Fantasy Convention presented three "Special Award--Professional" trophies to the writer, artist, and editor behind its volume on Patrick McGrath, Writing Madness.

Noting this press's novel treatments and presentations of the fiction of Stephen King, Thomas Ligotti, and Patrick McGrath at the Stoker Awards presentations in New Orleans on 15 June 2013, the Board of the 1,300 member-World Horror Association lauded how Centipede "specializes in horror, crime, and science fiction", yet also regularly produces important "art books, career retrospectives, and critical studies on horror films". As the award presenter put it: "Centipede Press titles strive to be excellent examples of bookmaking, with superior design, page layout, and dust jackets."

== Critical reception ==
The Press's new fiction is included regularly in annual print retrospectives, including The Best American Science Fiction and Fantasy, The Year's Best Science Fiction, The Best Horror of the Year, The Year's Best Fantasy and Horror, and The Mammoth Book of Best New Horror.

In an article from the leading trade journal on rare volumes, Fine Books & Collections, Richard Goodman contends that Centipede Press's major contribution is to show how the "weird and upsetting" are alluring or how "the ugly is beautiful" through the commissioned pen and ink drawings, paintings, photography, and woodcuts that accompany texts.

In 2010, Centipede Press also launched a periodical, The Weird Fiction Review, a yearly color print journal ranging from 300-400 pages that discusses the eerie, monstrous, and decadent in film, literature, comics, and magazines. The journal is edited by S. T. Joshi and features articles, essays, original fiction, poetry, and interviews.
