= Nina Allan =

British writer of speculative fiction

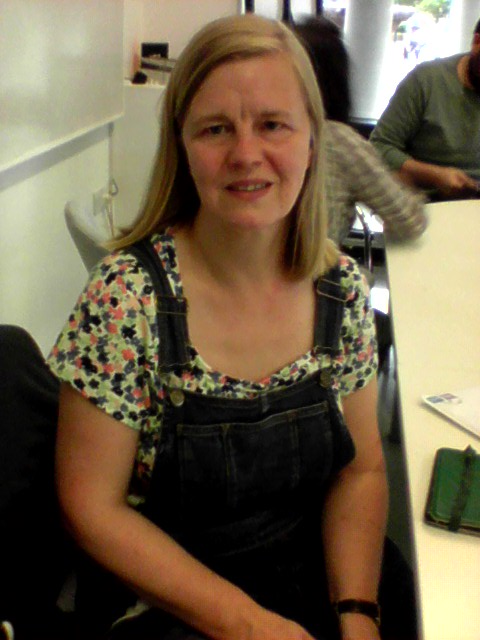
- Allan in 2016
- Born: 27 May 1966 (age 60); Whitechapel, London, England
- Education: University of Exeter; Corpus Christi College, Oxford
- Occupation: Writer
- Partner: Christopher Priest
- Writing career
- Genre: Speculative fiction
- Notable works: The Silver Wind; The Harlequin
- Notable awards: Aeon Award (2007); BSFA Best Short Fiction (2013); Grand Prix de L'Imaginaire (2014); Novella Award (2015)
- Website: The Spider's House

Nina Allan (born 27 May 1966) is a British writer of speculative fiction. She has published five collections of short stories, multiple novella-sized works, and five novels. Her stories have appeared in the magazines Interzone, Black Static and Crimewave and have been nominated for or won a number of awards, including the Grand prix de l'Imaginaire and the BSFA Award.

== Early life and education ==
Allan was born in Whitechapel, in the East End of London, and grew up in the Midlands and in West Sussex. She studied Russian language and literature at the University of Reading and the University of Exeter, and then did an MLitt at Corpus Christi College, Oxford.

After leaving Oxford she worked as a buyer for an independent chain of record stores based in Exeter, and then as a bookseller in London. Her first published story appeared in the British Fantasy Society journal Dark Horizons in 2002. She lived in the Taw Valley area of North Devon but now lives on Isle of Bute.

Her column "Nina Allan's Time Pieces" appears in Interzone.

== Critical reception ==
Allan's story Darkroom appeared in Subtle Edens: An Anthology of Slipstream Fiction edited by Allen Ashley Elastic Press in 2008. In a review of the collection Andy Hedgecock wrote that Nina Allan is developing into "one of the finest stylists of modern genre fiction." He went on to say that very few writers had her talent to uncover, "the strange within the ordinary with such clarity and precision."

Paul Kincaid in reviewing The Silver Wind asks when a series of stories can turn into a novel. He wrote that this was when, "the congeries of stories tell us more than any individual stories can." He suggests that this has been achieved and outlines the links between the stories before concluding that the sum of the parts is greater than the individual stories. One of the links is the viewpoint character Martin who appears in different parallel realities. Sofia Samatar however in her review questioned whether or not there is a danger in Allan's experiment of the emotional force being, "more likely to be lost than gained in the leaps between parallel realities."

In Peter Tennant's 2014 review of The Race he wrote that this was "one of the finest books" he had read that year, but also wrote that he did not know what it was about and could "only hazard guesses." Although a novel, it is, "four self-contained sections that form a greater whole." Sofia Samatar agrees that "The Race guards its secrets." She writes that, this is "a distancing novel about drawing in, a science fiction novel aware of its own artifice, a literary fiction impatient with mimesis."

In Stuart Conover's 2017 review of The Rift he stated "There are a lot of fun concepts here and a fully crafted alien world which could easily have a completely separate tale told in. Actually, I'd love to Nina revisit this world without even mentioning Selena, Julie, or the events from this book and just have it as connective tissue."

In Ian Sansom's review of Conquest he wrote "Nina Allan belongs to that small set of writers whom you probably haven’t heard of, but who is really famous among certain readers and also really good."

== Nominations and awards ==
Allan's story Angelus won the Aeon Award in 2007. It was announced at the European Science Fiction Convention in Copenhagen, Denmark in September 2007. The Grand Judge Ian Watson commented that it was “beautifully written and paced and enigmatic yet in an entirely lucid way.

Year	Work	Award	Category	Result	Ref
2007	"Angelus"	Aeon Award	—	Won	
2010	Flying in the Face of God	BSFA Award	Short Fiction	Shortlisted	
2013	The Gateway	Shirley Jackson Award	Novella	Shortlisted	
2013	Spin	BSFA Award	Short Fiction	Won	
2014	Spin	British Fantasy Award	Novella	Shortlisted	
2014	The Race	BSFA Award	Novel	Shortlisted	
2014	The Race	Kitschies	Red Tentacle (Novel)	Shortlisted	
2015	The Race	John W. Campbell Memorial Award	—	Shortlisted	
2015	The Harlequin	Novella Award	—	Won	
2017	"The Art of Space Travel"	Hugo Award	Novelette	Shortlisted	
2017	"The Art of Space Travel"	Locus Award	Novelette	Shortlisted	
2017	"The Art of Space Travel"	Theodore Sturgeon Award	—	Shortlisted	
2017	The Rift	BSFA Award	Novel	Won	
2017	The Rift	Kitschies	Red Tentacle (Novel)	Won	
2018	The Rift	John W. Campbell Memorial Award	—	Shortlisted	
2018	The Rift	Locus Award	Science Fiction Novel	Nominated–17th	
2018	The Gift of Angels	BSFA Award	Short Fiction	Shortlisted	

=== In translation ===
- The Silver Wind – retitled Complications – won the French Grand prix de l'Imaginaire for Foreign Short Fiction in 2014.

== Publications ==
=== Novels ===
- —— (2014). The Race. NewCon Press. ISBN 9781907069703.
- —— (2017). The Rift. Titan Books. ISBN 9781785650376.
- —— (2019). The Dollmaker. Riverrun. ISBN 9781787472549.
- —— (2021). The Good Neighbours (hardcover ed.). Riverrun. ISBN 9781529405170.
- —— (2023). Conquest (hardcover ed.). Riverrun. ISBN 9781529420777.
- —— (2025). A Granite Silence (hardcover ed.). Riverrun. ISBN 9781529435573.

=== Novellas ===
- —— (2013). Spin. The Third Alternative Press. ISBN 9780955368363.
- —— (2015). The Harlequin. Sandstone Press. ISBN 9781910124383.
- —— (2016). The Art of Space Travel (ebook ed.). Tor Books. ISBN 9780765390653.
- —— (2016). Maggots (ebook ed.). Five Stories High. ISBN 9781786180582.

In 2026, Allan published a novella with the Eden Book Society, a literary hoax created by Dead Ink Books, alongside authors Grady Hendrix, John Darnielle, Alison Rumfitt, Rowan Hisayo Buchanan and Chịkọdịlị Emelụmadụ. The six novellas were published pseudonymously, leaving readers to guess which author wrote which.

=== Collections ===
- —— (2007). A Thread of Truth. Eibonvale Press. ISBN 9780955526800.
- —— (2011). The Silver Wind. Eibonvale Press. ISBN 9781908125057.
- —— (2013). Microcosmos. NewCon Press. ISBN 9781907069475.
- —— (2013). Stardust: The Ruby Castle Stories. PS Publishing. ISBN 9781848636149.
- —— (2021). The Art of Space Travel and Other Stories. Titan. ISBN 9781789091755.

=== Short stories ===
- "A Storm in Kingstown" in Out of the Ruins, edited by Preston Grassmann, Titan Books, (2021), ISBN 978-1789097399

Allan's stories have appeared in various publications and six "Best of" collections:

- Allan's story "The Lammas Worm" appeared in Strange Tales 3 edited by Rosalie Parker of Tartarus Press in 2010. It was then selected by Ellen Datlow for The Best Horror of the Year: Volume Two. The story was re-printed as part of Stardust: The Ruby Castle Stories.
- Her story Flying in the Face of God appeared in issue 227 of Interzone in 2010. It was then selected by Gardner Dozois to appear in The Year's Best Science Fiction: Twenty-Eighth Annual Collection.
- The story "The Silver Wind" originally appeared in issue 233 of Interzone in 2011. It was reprinted in The Silver Wind and The Year’s Best Fantasy and Science Fiction 2012 edited by Rich Horton Prime Books. It was also short-listed for BSFA Awards for (short fiction) 2012.
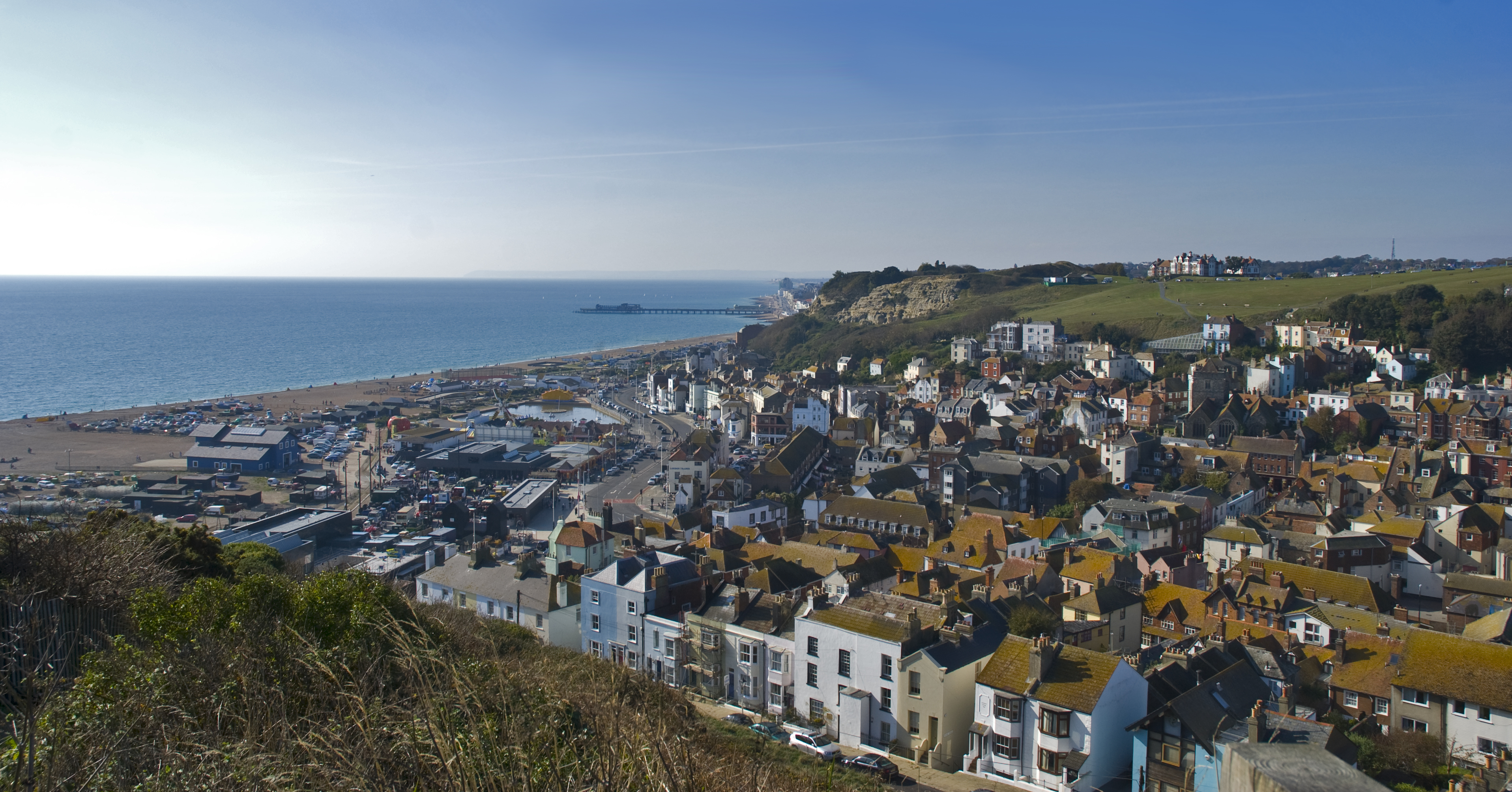
  Hastings
- Her story Wilkolak appeared in issue 11 of Crimewave edited by Andy Cox in 2011. It was selected by Maxim Jakubowski for The Mammoth Book of Best British Crime 10. Constable & Robinson 2013.
- "Sunshine" appeared in issue 29 of Black Static edited by Andy Cox in 2012. It was selected by Rich Horton for The Year’s Best Science Fiction and Fantasy 2013 Prime Books.
- Her story "The Tiger" appeared in Terror Tales of London edited by Paul Finch (Gray Friar Press) in 2013. It was then selected by Ellen Datlow for The Best Horror of the Year: Volume Six.

Allan has said that all her short fiction to date has been, "a kind of apprenticeship in novel-writing". Her first novel is The Race, which uses the town of Hastings for its landscape, where she was living for most of the time she was writing it.

== Notes ==
- A Thread of Truth: "Amethyst", "Ryman's Suitcase", "Bird Songs at Eventide", "Queen South", "The Vicar with Seven Rigs", "Heroes", "Terminus", and "A Thread of Truth."
- The Silver Wind: "Time's Chariot", "My Brother's Keeper", "The Silver Wind", "Rewind", and "Timelines: An Afterword."
  - In the French edition, titled Complications, "Darkroom" added as the opening story, "Chambre noire".
  - The Spanish edition, Máquinas del Tiempo, keeps the original contents.
- Microcosmos: "Microcosmos", "The Phoney War", "Chaconne", "A. H.", "Orinoco", "Flying in the Face of God" and "Higher Up."
- Stardust: Linked stories "B-Side", "The Lammas Worm", "The Gateway", "Laburnums", "Stardust", "Wreck of the Julia" and the poem "Red Queen". "Angelus", "Flying in the Face of God" and "Stardust" all involve Russian astrophysicist called Valery Kushnev. The collection was reissued in a slightly different form as Ruby, Titan Books (2020).
