= Inferno (anthology) =

2007 edited by Ellen Datlow

- Author: edited by Ellen Datlow
- Cover artist: Peter Lutjen
- Language: English
- Genre: Fantasy, Horror short stories
- Publisher: Tor Books
- Publication date: 2007
- Publication place: United States
- Media type: Print (hardback)
- Pages: 381 pp
- ISBN: 0-765-31558-0
- OCLC: 153772838

Inferno: New Tales of Terror and the Supernatural is an anthology of horror stories edited by Ellen Datlow. It was published by Tor Books in December 2007. The anthology itself won the 2008 World Fantasy Award for Best Anthology.

== Contents ==
- Introduction (Inferno: New Tales of Terror and the Supernatural), by Ellen Datlow
- "Riding Bitch", by K. W. Jeter
- "Misadventure", by Stephen Gallagher
- "The Forest", by Laird Barron
- "The Monsters of Heaven", by Nathan Ballingrud
- "Inelastic Collisions", by Elizabeth Bear
- "The Uninvited", by Christopher Fowler
- "13 O'Clock", by Mike O'Driscoll
- "Lives", by John Grant
- "Ghorla", by Mark Samuels
- "Face", by Joyce Carol Oates
- "An Apiary of White Bees", by Lee Thomas
- "The Keeper", by P. D. Cacek
- "Bethany's Wood", by Paul Finch
- "The Ease With Which We Freed the Beast", by Lucius Shepard
- "Hushabye", by Simon Bestwick
- "Perhaps the Last", by Conrad Williams
- "Stilled Life", by Pat Cadigan
- "The Janus Tree", by Glen Hirshberg
- "The Bedroom Light", by Jeffrey Ford
- "The Suits at Auderlene", by Terry Dowling

== Reprints ==
- Tor Books, March 2009.
