= The Fisherman (novel) =

2016 American horror novel by John Langan

- Author: John Langan
- Cover artist: Albert Bierstadt
- Language: English
- Genre: Lovecraftian horror
- Published: 2016
- Publisher: Word Horde
- Pages: 263
- Awards: 2016 Bram Stoker Award
- ISBN: 978-1-939905-21-5

The Fisherman is an American horror novel by John Langan. It won the 2016 Bram Stoker Award for Best Novel.

== Synopsis ==
Abraham, or Abe as he prefers, is a widower who struggles to find peace after his wife's death. After a bout of alcoholism, Abe uses fishing to find peace. Abe forms a friendship with his coworker Dan, who recently survived a terrible accident that left him a widower as well. After some weekends of fishing Dan suggests the pair try out Dutchman's Creek, a mysterious fishing spot with a cursed past that is rumored to bring back lost loved ones. On their way to the creek, they stop at a diner and are warned of the dangers of Dutchman's Creek; ignoring the warning, the two men continue on their way. At the creek they come face to face with the mysterious "Der Fisher", who is attempting to catch the primordial Leviathan. They are faced with the choice to help him and regain their lost loves or defy him and fight for survival.

== Reception ==
Martin Cahill of Tor praised the novel saying "Langan's novel is deliberate, elegant, and beautifully written; the horror and trauma of these two men is explored to the bone, and in the end, knowing them so well only makes the horrors to come that much more terrifying". Terrence Rafferty of The New York Times remarked, "Langan writes elegant prose, and the novel's rolling, unpredictable flow has a distinctive rhythm, the rise and fall of its characters' real grief."

Publishers Weekly, conversely, praised Langan's imagery but felt the story within the story bogged down the novel.

== Adaptation ==
In July 2026, Focus Features acquired rights to an adaptation of the novel, with David Lowery directing from a script by Lowery and Alex Ross Perry and Michael Bay, Brad Fuller, and Gary Dauberman being among the producers under the Platinum Dunes and Coin Operated banners.
