= The Race (Allan novel) =

2014 novel by Nina Allan

- First edition cover (NewCon Press, 2014)
- Author: Nina Allan
- Cover artist: Ben Baldwin
- Language: English
- Genres: Science fiction; literary fiction
- Publisher: NewCon Press (1st ed.); Titan Books (2nd ed.)
- Publication date: August 2014 (1st ed.); July 2016 (2nd ed.)
- Publication place: United Kingdom
- Media type: Hardback, paperback, ebook
- Pages: 256 (1st ed.); 444 (2nd ed.)
- ISBN: 978-1-907069-69-7 (1st ed.); 978-1-78565-036-9 (2nd ed.)

The Race is a 2014 literary science fiction novel by English writer Nina Allan. It is her debut novel and was first published in August 2014 in the United Kingdom by NewCon Press. A second edition of the book, in which an appendix was added, was published by Titan Books in July 2016. This new edition is the first book of a two-book deal Allan signed with Titan in 2015; the second book is The Rift, published in 2017.

The novel consists of four loosely connected novellas. The second edition of the book includes a fifth novella, referred to as an appendix. Allan described The Race as "A Mobius strip of actual and imagined realities, featuring telepathic dogs, giant whales, and the search for alien life." Two of the sections take place in "our world", whereas the other two, plus the second edition appendix, are set in an "alternate near-future".

The Race was generally well received by critics. It was nominated for three awards, the 2015 British Science Fiction Association Award for Best Novel, the 2015 Red Tentacle Award for Best Novel, and the 2015 John W. Campbell Memorial Award for Best Science Fiction Novel. The Race was translated into French by Bernard Sigaud as La Course and published by Tristram in 2017. The book was also translated into Spanish by Carmen Torres and Laura Naranjo as La carrera and published by Nevsky in 2017.

== Development ==
Prior to The Race, Allan had written a novella, Spin (2013), and published several story collections, including The Silver Wind (2011) and Stardust: The Ruby Castle Stories (2013). In Silver Wind and Stardust, the stories are tenuously linked to each other, an approach that Allan followed in the loosely connected novellas in The Race.

Allan said The Race turned out to be very different from its initial drafts. It began as a story about a World War I soldier suffering from Post-traumatic stress disorder who becomes a serial killer. The soldier was to have been Derek in the novel, but Allan found herself "disliking him so much" she focused instead on his sister, Christy. Allan said Christy's character came naturally to her because "her voice is closest to my own". The original character of Derek the soldier later became Dennis Beaumont in Allan's 2015 novella, The Harlequin.

Inspiration for the smartdogs came from Alejandro González Iñárritu's Mexican film Amores perros (2000) about underground dog fighting in Mexico City. Allan explained that while she disliked the "inherent cruelty" of dog fighting, she turned it into underground dog racing with telepathic greyhounds, drawing on an idea she had previously had about telepathic dogs on a remote planet.

== Plot summary ==
- Section 1 – Jenna: Jenna Hoolman and her brother, Del live in Sapphire, a former gas town in southeast England. The draining of the nearby Romney Marsh through fracking and the recent war has left the town destitute. Smartdog racing has become its only source of income. Smartdogs are greyhounds enhanced with human DNA to connect "telepathically" to human "runners" with neural implants. Del is actively involved in racing and has his own smartdog, Limlasker, but Jenna is frightened of her brother's drug-running and violent outbursts. He has a daughter, Luz Maree (Lumey) who, at three, starts to show signs of being an empath. Empaths are able to communicate with smartdogs without an implant. Lumey is kidnapped, ostensibly to force Del to settle his drug debts. He enters Limlasker in a race the dog is not ready for, hoping for a win to secure his daughter's release, but the dog is assassinated.
- Section 2 – Christy: Christy Peller lives in present-day Hastings in south England and is a writer. Some of her stories are set in the future in a fictional town called Sapphire where smartdog racing takes place. Christy lives in fear of her brother Derek, who once raped her. When Linda, his girlfriend, disappears after he discovered that she was planning to return to her previous boyfriend, Alex, Christy begins searching for her. She suspects that Derek may have murdered Linda.
- Section 3 – Alex: Alex Adeyemi grew up in Hastings, and twenty years after the events in Section 2, Christy invites him to come and visit her in Hastings to help her locate his former girlfriend, Linda. Alex discovers that Christy is a writer and begins reading her stories. He is particularly interested in At the Cedars Hotel, a collection of stories that includes "Dogs", and "Brock Island", a sequel to "Dogs".
- Section 4 – Maree: Maree is a young woman who lives in a secret government facility in Crimond She has no memories of her childhood, except those of a smartdog, Limlasker. She later learns that Derek Hoolman was her father and that she was kidnapped because she is an empath. She is sent to Thalia across the Atlantic Ocean by ship to a research facility called Kontessa. During the journey Maree learns of the real reason she is needed in Kontessa is to assist in translating extraterrestrial messages a SETI programme has intercepted.
- Appendix – Brock Island (Christy's story from At the Cedars Hotel): (Note: The appendix only appears in the second edition (2016) of the book.) After working at Kontessa for several years and not making much headway on the alien messages, Maree retires to Brock Island off the coast of Thalia. There she learns that an enigmatic artist Laura Christy has disappeared. Laura maintained that she has a twin sister, Sidonie who communicates with her in her dreams. While there is no record of the twin, Laura insisted that Sidonie is real and resides in a parallel world. Laura wrote that Sidonie told her they are reflections of one another, and that Sidonie and others in her world have been trying to communicate with their counterparts here for centuries. Maree finds some portraits Laura had painted of Sidonie, and in one of them, her twin is holding an abacus. Maree copies the bead pattern on the abacus, and later compares it with the patterns she had been working on in the alien transmissions. The bead pattern on the abacus matches the patterns in the alien transmissions.

== Critical reception ==
Second edition cover (Titan Books, 2016); cover artwork by Julia Lloyd

In a review of The Race in Locus magazine, Gary K. Wolfe wrote that despite the fragmented structure of the book, with its multiple narratives and narrators, and stories embedded within stories, it feels "oddly unified" and produces "a kind of psychic landscape". Wolfe stated that the world Allan has created here "is thoroughly seductive and ominously credible, and a degree of narrative sophistication as impressive as anything I've seen in recent SF". Niall Alexander described The Race as a blend of David Mitchell's Cloud Atlas and Jo Walton's Among Others. Reviewing the book at Tor.com Alexander called Allan's novel "a wonderfully understated work of words, worthy of all the awards [it] was nominated for". He said it shows how "the lives of ordinary people can become unfastened from reality". A review at Publishers Weekly described The Race as an "enticingly mysterious episodic debut novel". The narrative switches between fictional and actual settings: "real countries take on or remove altered fictional guises". The reviewer stated that "[s]trong writing and the layering of realities gives the book a mental hook akin to the best alternative history fiction".

Reviewing The Race in the LA Review of Books, Helen Marshall called Allan's novel "a story of split identities". The histories of people are reworked and merged and "the borders between fact and fiction dissolve". Outwardly this does not make sense until it becomes clear that Derek mirrors Del and Jenna is Christy's double. Marshall said the thread linking the sections of Allan's novel is "a secret language of memory". The characters bear the burden of their own memories, but also an inherited racial memory. Marshall noted that The Race is more than science fiction, it can also be seen as a ghost story reminiscent of the likes of M. John Harrison and Robert Aickman. She said Allan "makes the familiar unsettling", but also "shows how prosaic, how livable a horrible situation can become over time." Marshall described the book as "[i]ntensely readable and intellectually sophisticated", adding: "Like the very best works of literary fiction, The Race establishes its own rules for play, its own grammar: it is a world unto itself".

Stuart Conover at ScienceFiction.com had mixed feelings about The Race. He liked the first section and the dystopian England it portrayed, but found it "a little more difficult to experience the magic again" when the narrative returned to that world in the fourth section, knowing that it was a story within a story. Conover felt that while the quality of Allan's writing is good, and it is "a well put together piece", it is "not a perfect piece of science fiction". Kirkus Reviews also had a mixed reaction to the book. The reviewer said that the first novella "creates a brilliantly weird world that's utterly riveting", but felt that the next one is "flabby and inert" instead of "fraught", and in the third one, the story "gets bogged down by details". While the fourth novella returns to the "dystopian future" of the first, "readers will likely find it difficult to work up enthusiasm for this now doubly fictional world". The reviewer found the book's second edition appendix "baffling", and added that it "read like writing exercises that were never meant to see the light of day".

== Awards ==
Award	Year	Result
British Science Fiction Association Award for Best Novel	2015	Nominated
Red Tentacle Award for Best Novel	2015	Nominated
John W. Campbell Memorial Award for Best Science Fiction Novel	2015	Nominated

== Works cited ==
- Allan, Nina (2014). The Race (1st ed.). NewCon Press. ISBN 978-1-907069-69-7.
- Allan, Nina (2016). The Race (2nd ed.). Titan Books. ISBN 978-1-78565-036-9.
