= The Year's Best Fantasy and Horror =

Fantasy and horror anthology series

The Year's Best Fantasy and Horror was a reprint anthology published annually by St. Martin's Press from 1988 to 2007. In addition to the short stories, supplemented by a list of honorable mentions, each edition included a number of retrospective essays by the editors and others. The first two anthologies were originally published under the name The Year's Best Fantasy before the title was changed beginning with the third book.

For most of its run, the series was edited by Terri Windling and Ellen Datlow, with Windling primarily responsible for the "fantasy" portion of the content and Datlow for the "horror" portion. From the 16th edition (covering works first published in 2003), Windling's role was taken by the team of Kelly Link and Gavin Grant. The cover art for every edition was done by Thomas Canty. In 2009, it was announced that there would be no 2009 edition. Ellen Datlow is now editing The Best Horror of the Year published by Night Shade Books.

== Volumes ==
First edition Cover art by Thomas Canty

- The Year's Best Fantasy: First Annual Collection 1988
- The Year's Best Fantasy: Second Annual Collection 1989
- The Year's Best Fantasy and Horror: Third Annual Collection 1990
- The Year's Best Fantasy and Horror: Fourth Annual Collection 1991
- The Year's Best Fantasy and Horror: Fifth Annual Collection 1992
- The Year's Best Fantasy and Horror: Sixth Annual Collection 1993
- The Year's Best Fantasy and Horror: Seventh Annual Collection 1994
- The Year's Best Fantasy and Horror: Eighth Annual Collection 1995
- The Year's Best Fantasy and Horror: Ninth Annual Collection 1996
- The Year's Best Fantasy and Horror: Tenth Annual Collection 1997
- The Year's Best Fantasy and Horror: Eleventh Annual Collection 1998
- The Year's Best Fantasy and Horror: Twelfth Annual Collection 1999
- The Year's Best Fantasy and Horror: Thirteenth Annual Collection 2000
- The Year's Best Fantasy and Horror: Fourteenth Annual Collection 2001
- The Year's Best Fantasy and Horror: Fifteenth Annual Collection 2002
- The Year's Best Fantasy and Horror: Sixteenth Annual Collection 2003
- The Year's Best Fantasy and Horror: Seventeenth Annual Collection 2004
- The Year's Best Fantasy and Horror: Eighteenth Annual Collection 2005
- The Year's Best Fantasy and Horror: Nineteenth Annual Collection 2006
- The Year's Best Fantasy and Horror: Twentieth Annual Collection 2007
- The Year's Best Fantasy and Horror: Twenty-First Annual Collection 2008

== The Year's Best Fantasy: First Annual Collection ==
- "Buffalo Gals, Won't You Come Out Tonight" - Ursula K. Le Guin
- A World Without Toys - T. M. Wright
- DX - Joe Haldeman (poem)
- Friend's Best Man - Jonathan Carroll
- The Snow Apples - Gwyneth Jones
- Ever After - Susan Palwick
- My Name Is Dolly - William F. Nolan
- The Moon's Revenge - Joan Aiken
- Author's Notes - Edward Bryant
- Lake George in High August - John Robert Bensink
- Csucskári - Steven Brust
- The Other Side - Ramsey Campbell
- Pamela's Get - David J. Schow
- Voices in the Wind - Elizabeth S. Helfman
- Once Upon a Time, She Said - Jane Yolen (poem)
- The Circular Library of Stones - Carol Emshwiller
- Soft Monkey - Harlan Ellison
- Fat Face [Cthulhu Mythos] - Michael Shea
- Uncle Dobbin's Parrot Fair [Newford] - Charles de Lint
- The Pear-Shaped Man - George R. R. Martin
- Delta Sly Honey - Lucius Shepard
- Small Heirlooms - M. John Harrison
- The Improper Princess [Enchanted Forest] - Patricia C. Wrede
- The Fable of the Farmer and Fox - John Brunner
- Haunted - Joyce Carol Oates
- Dead Possums - Kathryn Ptacek
- Pictures Made of Stones - Lucius Shepard (poem)
- Splatter: A Cautionary Tale - Douglas E. Winter
- Gentlemen - John Skipp, Craig Spector
- Demon Luck [Ithkar] - Craig Shaw Gardner
- Words of Power - Jane Yolen
- Jamie's Grave - Lisa Tuttle
- The Maid on the Shore - Delia Sherman
- Halley's Passing - Michael McDowell
- White Trains - Lucius Shepard (poem)
- Simple Sentences - Natalie Babbitt
- A Hypothetical Lizard [Liavek] - Alan Moore
