= The Rift (Allan novel) =

2017 novel by Nina Allan

- First edition cover
- Author: Nina Allan
- Cover artist: Julia Lloyd
- Language: English
- Genres: Science fiction, literary fiction
- Publisher: Titan Books
- Publication date: July 2017
- Publication place: United Kingdom
- Media type: Paperback, ebook
- Pages: 423 (trade paperback)
- Awards: BSFA; Red Tentacle
- ISBN: 978-1-78565-037-6

The Rift is a 2017 literary science fiction novel by English writer Nina Allan. It was first published in July 2017 in the United Kingdom as a trade paperback by Titan Books. It is the second book of a two-book deal Allan signed with Titan in 2015; the first is the second edition of her debut novel, The Race, published in 2016.

The novel is about two sisters, Selena and Julie, who become separated when Julie disappears. Twenty years later she returns, claiming to have been on another planet, and Selena is conflicted over whether to believe Julie's story or not.

The Rift was generally well received by critics. It won two awards, the 2018 British Science Fiction Association Award for Best Novel, and the 2018 Red Tentacle Award for Best Novel, and was nominated for the 2018 John W. Campbell Memorial Award for Best Science Fiction Novel. The Rift was translated into French by Bernard Sigaud as La Fracture and published by Tristram in 2019.

== Development ==
The development of The Rift started from a short story Allan had been asked to write for Dead Letters: An Anthology of the Undelivered, the Missing, the Returned..., edited by Conrad Williams. Nina said, "I started writing and couldn't stop ... it wasn't long before I had 30,000 words and no end in sight. It was at this point I realised that what I was writing wasn't a short story at all, but my next novel." Despite having deviated from her original goal of writing a short story, Allan took time off from The Rift and wrote "Astray" for Dead Letters, a story she linked to the novel in order not to lose a "mental connection with the main project".

Hatchmere lake features prominently in The Rift, but Allan only had a chance to visit the site after she had begun work on the novel. Allan said she prefers to experience a location before writing about it, but on this occasion her schedule prevented that from happening. The visit to the lake did, however, occur later when she travelled to a nearby county to receive an award. Allan scoured the woodland surrounding the lake, and found the atmosphere it invoked not too different from what she imagined it would be prior to her visit. She found that its "overgrown and less frequented pathways just begging to be included in a some weird novel or other".

Allan cited Joan Lindsay's 1967 novel Picnic at Hanging Rock as a major influence on The Rift. As with alien abductions, where a gulf opens between abduction claimants and friends and family who do not, or cannot, believe their stories, Allan said in Picnic a similar divide opens between Irma and her classmates after her return. They are angry because they are convinced she knows what happened but will not tell them.

In an interview published in August 2017, Allan stated that much of her writing is about the "preservation of memories", and this "compulsion" she has "to pin down the sensation of memory" continues in The Rift. She said she mixes genres, science fiction and literary fiction, journalism and thriller, memoir and crime, to create an "[e]nriched genre" that "break[s] the template whilst still relishing what the template has to offer". Allan was critical of the current state of science fiction, stating that the genre publishers, who "demand ... more of the same rather than encouraging innovation", are part of the problem. She said she believes that "genre publishing will atrophy completely", and that "the more radical voices will be forced to find a home within mainstream literary publishing".

== Plot summary ==
Selena and her older sister Julie, live with their parents in Manchester, England. One day, when Julie is 17, she disappears without a trace. Several suspects are arrested, including an artisan, Steven Jimson, but all are released for lack of evidence. Hatchmere lake and its surrounds, believed to have been visited by Julie, are searched, but yield nothing. Years of conflict over Julie's disappearance leads to the sisters' parents divorcing: their mother stops thinking about her, while their father, convinced Julie is alive, obsesses over her, and suffers a mental breakdown and dies.

Twenty years later, Selena, who now works for Vanja at a jewellery store, and has come to terms with her sister's disappearance, is surprised by a phone call from a woman claiming to be Julie and requesting a meeting. She agrees to see her, and, although initially skeptical, is convinced it is Julie when her sister reveals something from their childhood that no one else knew about. Julie tells Selena she has been back in Manchester for 18 months, but has told no one who she is. Selena is angry with her sister for having put their family through so much anguish, but Julie tells Selena what happened to her. She reveals that she travelled from Hatchmere lake, via a rift, to a lake near the city of Fiby on the planet Tristane. Selena cannot believe how Julie could fabricate such lies to explain her absence. But as her sister expands on her story, Selena starts to wonder if such a thing could have happened. Julie explains that she was abducted by Jimson and taken to Hatchmere lake; she remembers escaping from him, then finding herself in a strange place and taken in by a woman named Cally and her brother, Noah. Julie learns from Cally where she is and that she has disappeared from this place before. Cally tells Julie that she was born on Tristane. Julie adjusts to her new life and finds out as much as she can about this new world. Years later, after a sexual encounter with Noah, Julie finds herself back in Manchester.

Selena does not know whether to believe Julie's story, and wonders if it is a fugue state brought on by her abduction. Selena takes Julie to see their mother, but she does not believe Julie is her missing daughter. Selena tells Vanja about Julie, and the two visit Hatchmere lake and attempt to retrace Julie's steps 20 years ago. Vanja finds what could be Julie's rucksack half buried in the bushes. They call the police, but make no mention of Julie's reappearance. The police later unearth a body and announce that DNA tests reveal a 98% certainty that the remains are Julie's. The sisters move into a house they bought and Selena introduces Julie to her mother as a friend, who still does not recognise Julie as her daughter.

== Critical reception ==
In a review in Locus magazine, Gary K. Wolfe wrote that The Rift is about "memory and identity" and tests our perceptions of reality. He called Allan's writing "subversive" in that she "play[s] with ... the familiar protocols of genre and ... the nature of the reading experience itself". Wolfe said Allan states her influences clearly in the novel by titling the section on Julie's story, "A Voyage to Arcturus", alluding to David Lindsay's 1920 novel of the same name; she also includes an essay by Julie, written before she disappears, on Peter Weir's 1975 film Picnic at Hanging Rock. Wolfe concluded that Allan's trail of clues "seems judicious and, at its best, brilliant", and "test whether our allegiance is to the SF adventure ... or to the ... earthbound mystery behind Julie's disappearance".

Editor and critic Maureen Kincaid Speller also questioned the nature of reality in The Rift. Writing in Interzone Speller explained that "we're dealing with the stories people tell themselves in order to make sense of things they don't understand". She said "the novel's greatest attraction" is that no explanation for what is happening is satisfactory; there is a "multiplicity of truths". Every time something appears certain, "Allan ... shifts the novel's perspective just sufficiently to cast doubt on that certainty", raising doubts about everything the reader reads. Speller stated that Allan has produced a book "with considerable skill and self-assurance", and called it "one of the best novels of 2017".

In a review in Strange Horizons, author Marcel Inhoff described The Rift as a "slipstream" novel, one that "move[s] in between genres" and eludes classification. He called it literary fiction with an embedded science fiction tale, although here Allan's science fiction challenges the reader to "view genre as a way to express and interrogate reality". Inhoff asks, "Can a story be told with the tropes and all the bells and whistles of science fiction, and still be true?" Inhoff said Allan's switch between literary fiction and science fiction is "stunning", and called The Rift "one of the best books published this year in any genre".

In The Encyclopedia of Science Fiction, science fiction critic John Clute called Julie's recollections of Tristane a planetary romance, and noted the similarities with Lindsay's novel, A Voyage to Arcturus. Clute added that Julie's story "is as insinuatingly plausible" as Kirk Allen's in Robert Lindner's 1955 book, The Fifty-Minute Hour.

== Awards ==
Year	Award		Result
2017	BSFA Award	Novel	Won
2017	Kitschies	Red Tentacle	Won
2018	John W. Campbell Memorial Award	—	Shortlisted
2018	Locus Award	Science Fiction Novel	Nominated–17th

== Works cited ==
- Allan, Nina (2017). The Rift (e-book ed.). London: Titan Books. ISBN 978-1-78565-039-0.
