= KGB (bar) =

Soviet-era themed bar in New York City, US

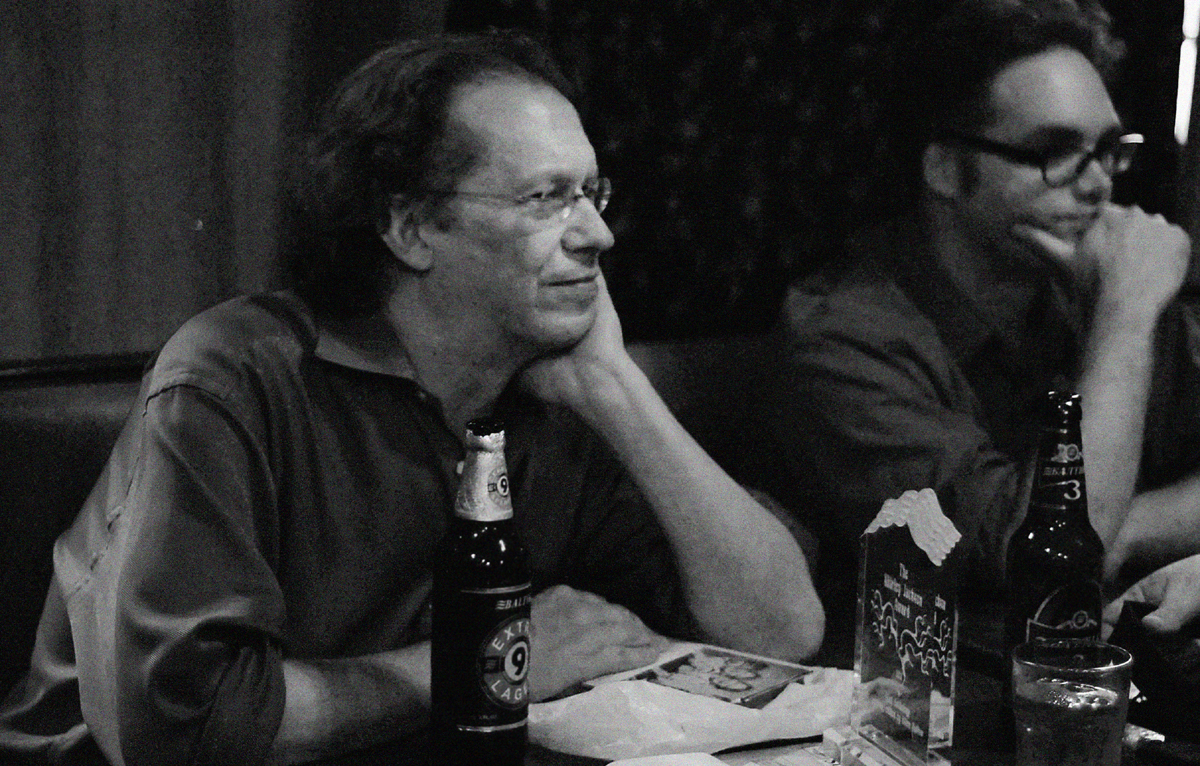
- Interactive map of KGB
- Location: 85 E. 4th Street, East Village, Manhattan, New York City, New York, United States
- Coordinates: 40.726580°N 73.989923°W
- Type: Bar

Construction
- Opened: 1993

Website
- Official website

KGB is a Soviet era-themed ("Communist chic" ) bar located in the East Village of New York City.

== History ==
Before its present incarnation, the building had been the Palm Casino, a speakeasy controlled by Lucky Luciano. From 1948 to 1988 it was a private social club for communists and socialists. On the bar's walls are "Stalinist woodcuts, World War II posters, a picture of Valentina V. Tereshkova, hammer-and-sickle flags and the odd Lenin bust and balalaika."

Inspired by the Soviet-era memorabilia stored in the building, KGB Bar opened in 1993, and became one of the most popular book-reading venues in New York City. Popular authors read here pro bono on Sunday evenings (fiction), Monday evenings (poetry), and most Tuesdays, Wednesdays and Thursdays. The bar is home to KGB Bar Lit, a literary magazine founded in 2006 by Denis Woychuk. The New York writer and critic Carrigan Miller re-launched the publication in 2023 and serves as its Editor-in-Chief. KGB has been named best literary venue in New York City by New York magazine, The Village Voice, and others.

== Reading series ==
The bar and magazine host several regular reading series which include:

- Trumpet Fiction – Literary fiction and arts, held on the second Saturday of every month, hosted by Jonathan Kravetz.
- Fantastic Fiction – A monthly speculative fiction reading series at the KGB Bar, held on the third Wednesday of every month, currently hosted by Ellen Datlow and Matthew Kressel.
- Monday Night Poetry Series – Founded by David Lehman and Star Black, this series has lasted more than a decade and features contemporary poets in its fall and spring seasons. The series spawned a book, The KGB Bar Book of Poems, in 2000. Currently, the event is hosted by John Deming, Jada Gordon, Susan Lewis, and Tyler Allen Penny.
