= Lady Churchill's Rosebud Wristlet =

Speculative fiction magazine

- Editor: Gavin Grant and Kelly Link
- Categories: speculative fiction
- Frequency: Biannual
- Format: zine
- First issue: Winter 1996-1997
- Company: Small Beer Press
- Country: United States
- Based in: Northampton, Massachusetts
- Language: English
- Website: smallbeerpress.com/lcrw/
- ISSN: 1544-7782

Lady Churchill's Rosebud Wristlet (LCRW) is a twice-yearly small press zine published by Small Beer Press, edited by Gavin Grant and Kelly Link. It contains an eclectic mix of fiction, poetry, and nonfiction, with an emphasis on speculative fiction, fantasy or slipstream. Link, Karen Joy Fowler, and Ursula K. Le Guin are among the most prominent of writers who have published in LCRW.

The first issue was produced during the winter of 1996–1997 "in an edition of 26 copies or so" and reprinted next year when Link's story from it won the James Tiptree Jr. Award.

In November 2006, the 19th issue was published (marking 10 years). In August 2007, The Best of Lady Churchill's Rosebud Wristlet (edited by Link and Grant, ISBN 0-345-49913-1) was published by Del Rey Books. In November 2007 the 21st issue came out.

LCRW was nominated for the 2007 Hugo Award for Best Semiprozine; several of its stories have been nominated for the major genre awards as well.
