= The Best Horror of the Year =

Series of horror fiction anthologies edited by Ellen Datlow

- Cover of first edition
- Volume One, Volume Two, Volume Three, Volume Four, Volume Five, Volume Six, Volume Seven, Volume Eight, Volume Nine, Volume Ten, Volume Eleven, Volume Twelve
- Edited by: Ellen Datlow
- Country: United States
- Language: English
- Genre: Horror fiction anthology
- Publisher: Night Shade Books
- Published: 2009–present
- Media type: Print (paperback); eBook
- No. of books: 15

The Best Horror of the Year is a series of horror fiction anthologies edited by Ellen Datlow. The series is published by Night Shade Books. The format of the series is a collection of horror stories that vary in topic, contributed by multiple authors. A new volume has been released yearly since 2009.

== Volumes ==
- The Best Horror of the Year: Volume One (2009)
- The Best Horror of the Year: Volume Two (2010)
- The Best Horror of the Year: Volume Three (2011)
- The Best Horror of the Year: Volume Four (2012)
- The Best Horror of the Year: Volume Five (2013)
- The Best Horror of the Year: Volume Six (2014)
- The Best Horror of the Year: Volume Seven (2015)
- The Best Horror of the Year: Volume Eight (2016)
- The Best Horror of the Year: Volume Nine (2017)
- The Best Horror of the Year: Volume Ten (2018)
- The Best Horror of the Year: Volume Eleven (2019)
- The Best Horror of the Year: Volume Twelve (2020)
- The Best Horror of the Year: Volume Thirteen (2021)
- The Best Horror of the Year: Volume Fourteen (2022)
- The Best Horror of the Year: Volume Fifteen (2024)
