= Sandra Kasturi =

Poet, editor and publisher

- Born: 1966; Põltsamaa, Estonia

Sandra Kasturi (born 1966), is a poet, editor and publisher.

== Biography ==
Sandra Kasturi was born in Estonia. Her parents were Estonian and Sri Lankan. She now lives in Canada where she is a poet, editor and publisher. She has two poetry collections of her own and was the editor on an anthology of poetry. She has both poetry and fiction published in magazines. Kasturi was also an editor for the publishing house ChiZine Publications, which she founded with her husband Brett Savory.

== Awards ==
- 2001 Bram Stoker Award: Chiaroscuro (by Patricia Lee Macomber, Steve Eller, SK & Brett A. Savory)
- 2013 British Fantasy Award: ChiZine Publications (by Brett Alexander Savory & SK)
- 2015 World Fantasy Award: (SK & Brett Alexander Savory) for ChiZine Publications
- 2018 Sunburst Award: “The Beautiful Gears of Dying” (The Sum of Us)

== Bibliography ==
=== Collections ===
- The Animal Bridegroom (2007)
- Come Late to the Love of Birds (2012)

=== Anthologies ===
- The Stars as Seen from This Particular Angle of Night (2003)

=== Short fiction ===
- The Coming of Ghosts (2010)
- Mrs. Kong (2011)
- Foxford (2011)
- The Slowing of the World (2011)
- The Hair Dress (2013)
- Mungo the Vampire (2014)
- The Beautiful Gears of Dying (2017)
- In the Moon Garden (2019)
