= Brett Alexander Savory =

Canadian writer/publisher

Brett Savory is a freelance writer, editor, and web designer. He lives in Canada with his wife, writer and editor, Sandra Kasturi.

== Bibliography ==
=== Novels ===
- A Perfect Machine (Angry Robot Books, February 2017)
- In and Down (Brindle & Glass Publishing, September 2007)
- The Distance Travelled (Necro Publications, March 2006)

=== Short story collections ===
- No Further Messages (Delirium Books, November 2007)

=== Short Stories / Novellas ===
- "Everyone on Earth"—World Horror Convention Souvenir Book (April 2011)
- "Safe"—Chilling Tales (March 2011)
- "The Machine is Perfect, the Engineer is Nobody"—Taddle Creek (October 2008)
- "I Am Today and I Am Yesterday" (with David Niall Wilson) —In Delirium II (Delirium Books, December 2007)
- The Distance Travelled: A Little Slice of Heaven (with Gord Zajac; Burning Effigy Press, April 2007)
- "Anniversary of an Uninteresting Event"—In the Dark: Stories from the Supernatural (reprint; October 2006)
- "Quiet Rapture"—Delirium Insider (October 2006)
- "Messages"—Realms of Fantasy (February 2006)
  - reprinted in The Year's Best Fantasy & Horror (September 2007)
- "Wall"—Ideomancer.com (December 2005)
  - reprinted at Suspect Thoughts (July 2006)
- "Subliminal Verses"—Trunk Stories, Issue #3 (November 2005)
- "Running Beneath the Skin"—Outsiders: 22 All-New Stories from the Edge (Penguin/Roc, October 2005)
- Philip Nutman's Wet Work (Definitive Edition) —Editorial Consultant (Overlook Connection Press, September 2005)
- My Eyes Are Nailed, But Still I See—co-written with David Niall Wilson (Delirium Books, July 2005)
- "Bottom Drawer"—Vestal Review (January 2005)
  - reprinted at The Future Fire—runner-up winner of the MirrorMask Flash Fiction Competition (January 2006)
  - reprinted at Rockstar Upload website—runner-up winner of the Rockstar Upload 4 Short Fiction Contest (February 2006)
- "Apology"—Brutarian (November 2004)
- The Last Pentacle of the Sun: Writings in Support of the West Memphis Three—co-edited with M. W. Anderson (Arsenal Pulp Press, October 2004)
- "Shoes" (with Tim Lebbon) —A Walk on the Darkside: Visions of Horror (Penguin/Roc, September 2004)
  - (A Year's Best Fantasy and Horror honorable mention)
- "Landscape"—Trunk Stories, Issue #1 (November 2003)
  - Romanian translation published at C.A.V.L.A SFera Online as "Viziune" (July 2003)
- "Slipknot"—Borderlands 5 (Borderlands Press, November 2003)
  - reprinted in From the Borderlands (Warner Books, September 2004)
    - (A Bram Stoker Award-winning anthology)
- Denying Death (with Gary W. Conner and Seth Lindberg) —Prime Books (November 2003)
  - Includes "Silica," "Beyond the Black," "Anniversary of an Uninteresting Event," "Walking," and "The Collective"
- "The Pig and the Pendulum" (with David Niall Wilson) —Gothic.Net (October 2003)
- "A Diamond of Skin and Love"—Vivisections, Catalyst Press (March 2003)
- "Freshets"—Queer Fear II, Arsenal Pulp Press (December 2002)
  - (A Lambda Literary Award-winning anthology)
- "Mad Jack and the Widow Henley" (with Brian A. Hopkins) —Space & Time, Issue #96 (July 2002)
- "Chamber of the Gods" (with Gord Rollo) —Fangoria.com (June 2002)
  - reprinted in Dark Wisdom #9 (June 2006)
- "Mr. Chumbly"—Dreaming of Angels—Prime Books (April 2002)
- "Danny Boy"—The Asylum ... Bedtime Stories for the Criminally Insane, Vol. 2: The Violent Ward, DarkTales Publications (April 2002)
  - reissued by Prime Books in February 2003
- "The Time Between Lights"—Brainbox II: Son of Brainbox—Irrational Press (December 2001)
- The Distance Travelled—Prime Books (November 2001)
  - (A Year's Best Fantasy and Horror honorable mention)
- The Smoke of the Seven Hells—Undaunted Press 'flipbook' (October 2001)
- "Twelve Great Black Pigs, and One Red One" (with David Niall Wilson) —Gothic.Net (August 2001)
- "Jimmy Dale"—Gothic.Net (April 2001)
- Filthy Death, the Leering Clown (with Joseph Moore) —DarkTales Publications (October 2000)
- "Ribbons of Darkness Over Me" (with David Niall Wilson) —Twilight Showcase (#15, February 2000)
- "Silica"—Gothic.Net (January 2000)
  - reprinted at Imaginary Worlds Press website (August 2000)
- "Epicure" (with Patricia Lee Macomber) —Cassandra's Crypt, Goddess of the Bay Publications (January 2000)
- "Fucking Fear Factory" (with David Niall Wilson) —Gothic.Net (September 1999)
  - reprinted at Twilight Tales (December 1999)
- "First Child of the New World" (with Geoff Cooper and Ray Wallace) —Errata (#5, August 1999)
- "A Room of Incense" (with Dan Lee) —The Three-lobed Burning Eye (#2, July 1999)
  - reprinted in The Three-lobed Burning Eye—Annual, Volume 1 anthology (Legion Press, October 2002)
- "Poland's Anguish"—The Goddess of the Bay (#7, Summer 1999)
- "Jewels"—The Asylum . . . Bedtime Stories for the Criminally Insane, Vol. 1: The Psycho Ward, DarkTales Publications (1999)
- "Solstice" (with Sandra DeLuca) —Twilight Showcase (#4, March 1999)
- "That's Some Pig!" (with David Niall Wilson) —Of Pigs and Spiders, Bereshith Publishing (Shadowlands imprint, March 1999)
  - reprinted at HorrorFind.com (October 2000)
- "The Neath"—Twilight Showcase (#3, February 1999)
  - reprinted in Gord Rollo's Unnatural Selection: A Collection of Darwinian Nightmares anthology (LTDBooks, October 2000; Cosmos Books, August 2001)
- "Pop! Goes the Weasel" (with Brian A. Hopkins) —Bad Dreams (#8, 1999)
- "Honour Thy Father and Mother . . ."—Dark Muse (October 1998)
  - reprinted in Bloody Muse (February 1999)
  - reprinted in Bad Dreams (#7)
- "Age of Faith"—The Goddess of the Bay (#3, October 1998)
- "Stars"—The Goddess of the Bay (#2, Fall 1998)

== Awards & honorable mentions ==
=== Awards ===
- World Fantasy Award for Special Award—Professional (2015) [Winner]
- British Fantasy Award for Best Small Press (2013) [Winner]
- World Fantasy Award for Special Award—Professional (2013) [Nominated]
- World Fantasy Award for Special Award—Professional (2012) [Nominated]
- World Fantasy Award for Special Award—Professional (2011) [Nominated]
- In and Down named a Quill & Quire "Book of the Year" (2007)
- Bram Stoker Award for Superior Achievement in Editing (2004) [Nominated]
- Bram Stoker Award for Superior Achievement in Editing (2000) [Winner]

=== YBFH Appearances & Honorable Mentions ===
- Year's Best Fantasy & Horror 20th edition appearance: "Messages" (2007)
- Year's Best Fantasy & Horror honorable mention: "Shoes" (co-written with Tim Lebbon; 2004)
- Year's Best Fantasy & Horror honorable mention: The Distance Travelled (novella; 2001)

== Citations ==
1. All biographic and bibliographic information is from the "Official Brett Alexander Savory website". 16 March 2007.
2. Bram Stoker Awards information is from the "Horror Writers Association". 16 March 2007. Archived from the original on 20 June 2000.
