= Gavin Grant (editor) =

British writer and editor

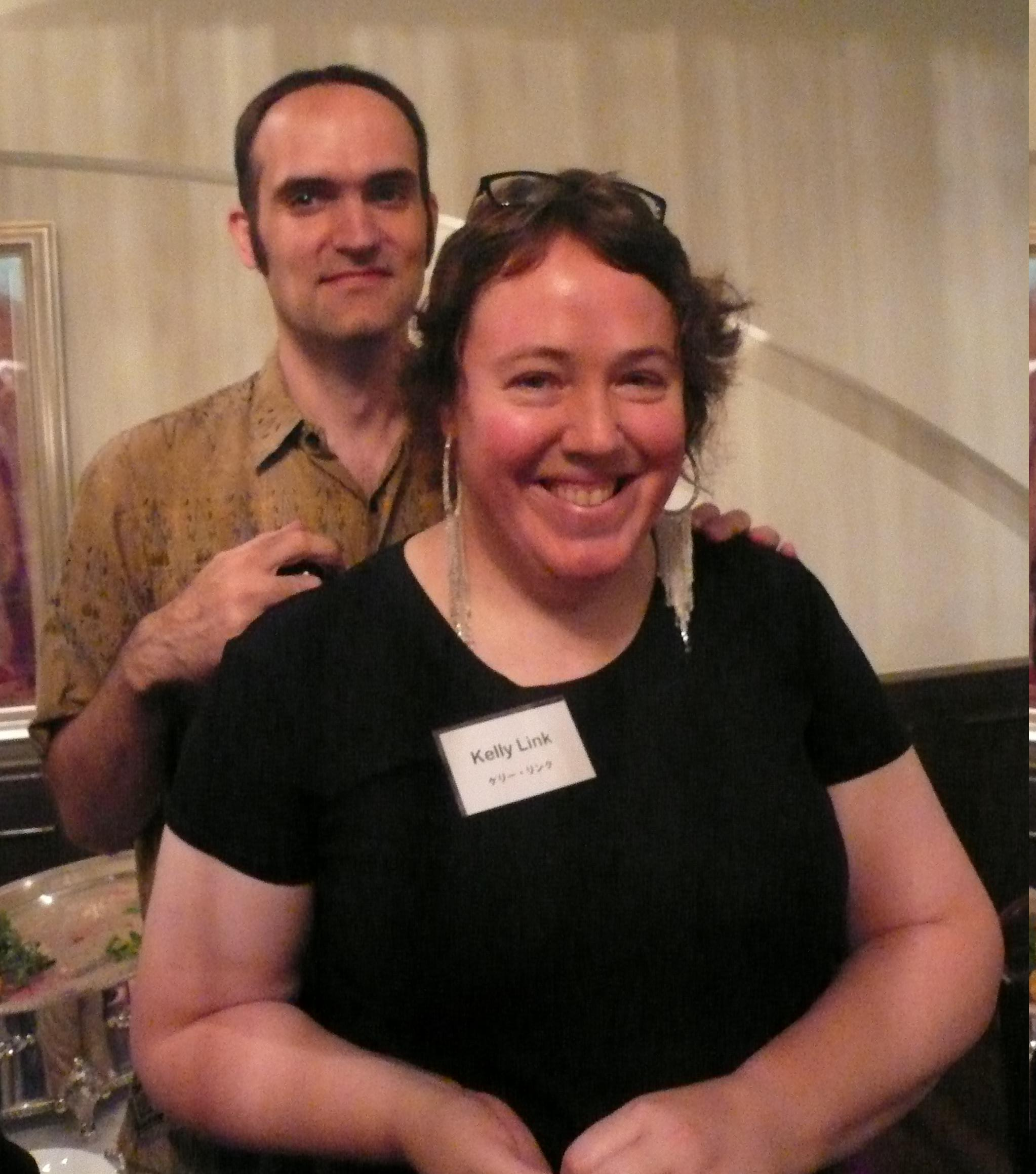
- Gavin Grant with Kelly Link
- Occupations: Editor, writer
- Spouse: Kelly Link
- Writing career
- Notable works: Lady Churchill's Rosebud Wristlet; Year's Best Fantasy and Horror
- Notable awards: Bram Stoker Award

Gavin J. Grant is a science fiction editor and writer. He runs Small Beer Press along with his wife Kelly Link. In addition, he has been the editor of Lady Churchill's Rosebud Wristlet since 1996 and, from 2003 to 2008, was co-editor of The Year's Best Fantasy and Horror anthology series along with Link and Ellen Datlow. Their 2004 anthology was awarded the Bram Stoker Award for best horror anthology.

He moved to the United States from Scotland in 1991. He is married to Kelly Link and lives with her in Northampton, Massachusetts.

In 2019, Grant and Link opened Book Moon, an independent bookstore in Easthampton, Massachusetts.
