= Laird Barron =

American author and poet

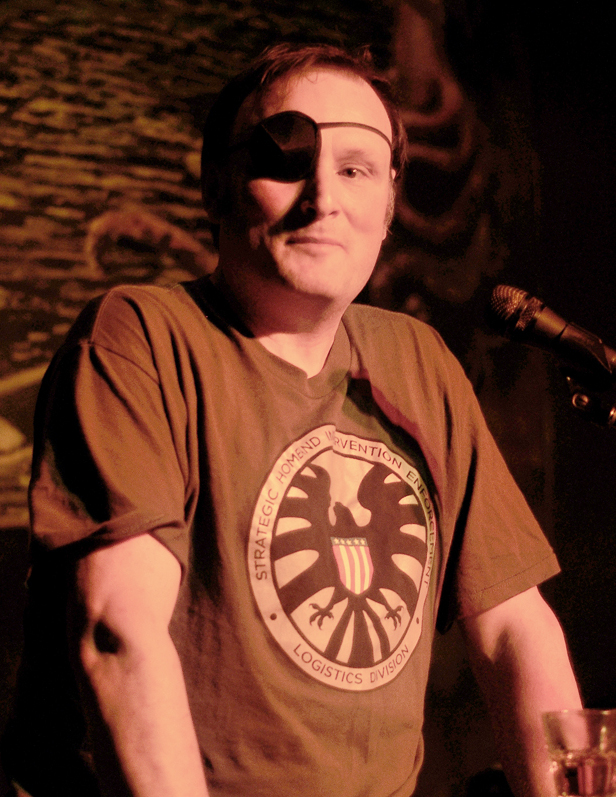
- Laird Barron 2016
- Born: March 5, 1970 (age 56); Palmer, Alaska, U.S.
- Occupations: Writer, sled dog racer
- Writing career
- Period: 2000–present
- Genres: Speculative fiction, horror fiction, fantasy, science fiction, hardboiled, weird fiction, poetry

Laird Samuel Barron (born March 5, 1970) is an American author and poet, much of whose work falls within the horror, noir, or horror noir and dark fantasy genres. He has also been the managing editor of the now-defunct online literary magazine Melic Review. He lives in Upstate New York.

== Early life ==
Barron spent his early years in Alaska. He has described his youth as exceedingly harsh because his family was poor and lived in isolated areas.

== Career ==
In Alaska, Barron raced the Iditarod three times during the early 1990s, and worked as a fisherman on the Bering Sea.

He retired from racing and moved to Washington in 1994. He became active on the poetry scene, publishing with a number of online journals and eventually serving as the managing editor of the Melic Review. His professional writing debut occurred in 2001 when Gordon Van Gelder published "Shiva, Open Your Eye" in the September issue of The Magazine of Fantasy & Science Fiction. Barron's debut collection, The Imago Sequence & Other Stories, was published in 2007 by Night Shade Books.

He has stated his affection for pulp fiction, westerns, and noir, and his work typically combines one or more of these elements with a horrific or weird supernatural intrusion. Barron has referred to the Bible and the Necronomicon as "the greatest horror stories ever told."

In addition to The Magazine of Fantasy & Science Fiction, Barron's work has been featured in SCI FICTION, Inferno: New Tales of Terror and the Supernatural, Lovecraft Unbound, Black Wings: New Tales of Lovecraftian Horror, and The Del Rey Book of Science Fiction and Fantasy. It has also been reprinted in numerous year's best anthologies and nominated for multiple awards.

He was a 2007 and 2010 Shirley Jackson Award winner for his collections The Imago Sequence and Other Stories and Occultation and Other Stories. "Mysterium Tremendum" won a 2010 Shirley Jackson Award for best novella. He is also a 2009 nominee for his novelette "Catch Hell". Other award nominations include the Crawford Award, Sturgeon Award, International Horror Guild Award, World Fantasy Award, Bram Stoker Award and the Locus Award.

His second novel, The Croning, was published in 2012 by Night Shade Books. His next three novels were published by G.P. Putnam's Sons, and featured a new character: mob enforcer turned private investigator Isaiah Coleridge.

=== Appraisal ===
Critic S.T. Joshi discussed Barron's work in 21st Century Horror, giving the author a mixed assessment.

Barron's first two story collections include what Joshi describes as "some of the best weird writing of the past several decades". Joshi characterizes Barron as exhibiting "a prose style of singular panache and deftness, along with a complex fusion of several genres [which] can produce scintillating effects unlike those found in any other writer in the field". On a more negative note, Joshi says Barron's writing can "devolve into a schtick, as Barron overuses the same motifs over and over again" and has changed his writing style for the worse over the years, with a "turgid, clotted" writing stye promoted by the likes of the Iowa Writers Workshop.

== Bibliography ==
=== Novels ===
- The Light is the Darkness, Bloodletting Press 2011
- The Croning, Night Shade Books 2012
- Blood Standard, G.P. Putnam's Sons 2018
- Black Mountain, G.P. Putnam's Sons 2019
- Worse Angels, G.P. Putnam's Sons 2020

=== Novellas ===
- X's For Eyes, JournalStone 2015
- Man With No Name: A Nanashi Novella, JournalStone 2016
- The Wind Began To Howl: An Isaiah Coleridge Story, Bad Hand Books 2023

=== Collections ===
- The Imago Sequence & Other Stories, Night Shade Books 2007; Trade paperback 2009
- Occultation, Night Shade Books 2010 Shirley Jackson Award. Best Collection.
- The Beautiful Thing That Awaits Us All, Night Shade Books 2013
- A Little Brown Book of Burials, Borderlands Press 2015
- Swift to Chase, JournalStone 2016
- Not a Speck of Light: Stories, Bad Hand Books 2024

=== Anthology appearances ===
- The Year's Best Fantasy & Horror 17 St Martin's 2004
- The Year's Best Fantasy & Horror 18 St Martin's 2005
- The Three-Lobed Burning Eye Annual Volume No. 2 Legion Press 2005
- Trochu divné kusy 2 2006
- Fantastyka Number 4 2006
- The Year's Best Fantasy & Horror 19 St. Martin's 2006
- Horror: Best of 2005 Prime 2006
- Fantasy: Best of 2005 Prime 2006
- Year's Best Fantasy 6 Tachyon 2006
- Inferno Tor 2007
- Year's Best Fantasy 7 Tachyon 2007
- The Year's Best Fantasy & Horror 21 2008
- Clockwork Phoenix Norilana Press 2008
- Year's Best Fantasy 8 Tachyon 2008
- The Del Rey Book of Science Fiction & Fantasy Del Rey 2008
- Jack Haringa Must Die! 2008
- Lovecraft Unbound Dark Horse Comics 2009
- The Best Horror of the Year 1 Night Shade Books 2009
- Poe Solaris 2009
- Wilde Stories 2010 Lethe 2010
- Haunted Legends Tor Books 2010
- Cthulhu's Reign DAW Books 2010
- The Best Horror of the Year 2 Night Shade Books 2010
- Black Wings PS Publishing 2010
- The Year's Best Dark Fantasy & Horror 2011 ed Prime 2011
- The Book of Cthulhu Night Shade Books 2011
- Blood & Other Cravings Tor 2011
- Ghosts by Gaslight HarperCollins 2011
- Supernatural Noir Dark Horse 2011
- The Best Horror of the Year 3 Night Shade Books 2011
- New Cthulhu Prime Books 2011
- Creatures Prime Books 2011
- Wilde Stories 2011 Lethe 2011
- Dark Faith 2 Apex Books 2012
- Heiresses of Russ Lethe 2012
- Ghosts: Recent Hauntings Prime Books 2012
- A Season in Carcosa Miskatonic River Press 2012
- The Book of Cthulhu 2 Night Shade Books 2012
- Fungi Innsmouth Free Press 2012
- The Best Horror of the Year 4 Night Shade Books 2012
- Horror For Good: A Charitable Anthology (Volume 1) Cutting Block Press 2012
- Tales of Jack the Ripper Word Horde 2013
- Suffered from the Night Lethe Press 2013
- Blood Type: An Anthology of Vampire SF on the Cutting Edge Nightscape Press 2013
- Shades of Blue & Gray Prime Books 2013
- The Best Horror of the Year 5 Night Shade Books 2013
- The Year's Best Dark Fantasy & Horror 2012 ed Prime Books 2013
- The Mad Scientist's Guide to World Domination 2013
- Nightmare Carnival Dark Horse 2014
- Fearful Symmetries Chizine Publications 2014
- A Mountain Walked Centipede Press 2014
- Gigantic Worlds Gigantic 2014
- Lovecraft's Monsters Tachyon 2014
- The Cutting Room Tachyon 2014
- The Year's Best Dark Fantasy & Horror 2013 edition Prime Books 2014
- The Best Horror of the Year 6 Night Shade Books 2014

=== Stories ===
- "Hour of the Cyclops," Three-Lobed Burning Eye 2000
- "Shiva, Open Your Eye", The Magazine of Fantasy & Science Fiction 2001
- "Old Virginia", The Magazine of Fantasy & Science Fiction 2003
- "Bulldozer," SCI FICTION 2004
- "Parallax," SCI FICTION 2005
- The Imago Sequence, The Magazine of Fantasy & Science Fiction 2005
- "Proboscis," The Magazine of Fantasy & Science Fiction 2005
- "The Royal Zoo is Closed," Phantom # Zero 2006
- Hallucigenia, The Magazine of Fantasy & Science Fiction 2006
- "The Forest", Inferno 2007
- "Procession of the Black Sloth", The Imago Sequence & Other Stories 2007
- "The Lonely Death of Agent Haringa," Kill Jack Haringa 2008
- "Occultation", Clockwork Phoenix 2008
- "The Lagerstätte," Del Rey Book of Science Fiction & Fantasy 2008
- "Catch Hell," Lovecraft Unbound 2009
- "Strappado," Poe 2009
- The Broadsword, Black Wings 2010
- "Six Six Six," Occultation 2010
- Mysterium Tremendum, Occultation 2010
- "--30--," Occultation 2010
- "Vastation," Cthulhu's Reign 2010
- "The Redfield Girls," Haunted Legends 2010
- "The Men from Porlock," The Book of Cthulhu (Night Shade Books) 2011
- "The Carrion Gods in Their Heaven" Supernatural Noir 2011
- "The Siphon," Blood & Other Cravings 2011
- "Blackwood's Baby", Ghosts by Gaslight 2011
- "a strange form of life" Dark Faith 2 2012
- "More Dark" The Revelator 2012
- "Frontier Death Song", Nightmare Magazine 2012
- Hand of Glory The Book of Cthulhu 2 2012
- "D T," A Season in Carcosa 2012
- "Gamma," Fungi 2012
- "The Beatification of Custer Poe" Shades of Blue & Gray 2013
- "Ardor" Suffered from the Night 2013
- "Black Dog" Halloween: Mystery, Magic & the Macabre 2013
- "Slave Arm" Blood Type: An Anthology of Vampire SF on the Cutting Edge 2013
- "Nemesis", Primeval 2013
- "Termination Dust" Tales of Jack the Ripper 2013
- "LD50" Weaponized 2013
- "Blood & Stardust" The Mad Scientist's Guide to World Domination 2013
- "Jaws of Saturn" The beautiful Thing That Awaits Us All 2013
- Man with No Name A Mountain Walked 2014
- "Screaming Elk, MT" Nightmare Carnival 2014
- "Rex" Gigantic Worlds 2014
- "the worms crawl in," Fearful Symmetries 2014
- X's for Eyes JournalStone novella 2015
- "Rex" Gigantic Worlds 2015
- "The Cyclorama" Licence Expired 2015
- "The Blood in My Mouth" The Madness of Cthulhu 2015
- "Strident Caller" Whispers from the Abyss 2 2015
- "49 Foot Woman Straps it On" Protectors 2 2015
- "Fear Sun" Innsmouth Nightmares 2015
- "We Smoke the Northern Lights" The Gods of H.P. Lovecraft 2015
- "In a Cavern, in a Canyon", Seize the Night 2015
- "Don't Make Me Assume My Ultimate Form" Cthulhu Fhtagn! 2015
- "Ears Prick Up" SQ Mag Edition 18 2015
- Tomahawk Park Survivors Raffle Swift to Chase 2016
- An Atlatl Limbus III 2016
- "Mobility" What the #%@!is That? 2016
- "Andy Kaufman Creeping through the Trees" Autumn Cthulhu 2016
- "Oblivion Mode" Lovecraft's Children 2016
- "A Clutch" The Mammoth Book of Cthulhu 2016
- Man with No Name JournalStone novella 2016
- "Swift to Chase" Adam's Ladder 2017
- "Girls without their Faces On", Ashes and Entropy 2018
- "We Used Swords in the '70s" Weird Fiction Review 9, 2019
- “The One We Tell Bad Children” Final Cuts 2020
- “Ode to Joad the Toad” Miscreations: Gods, Monsters, & Other Horrors 2020
- “Jōren Falls” Come Join Us by the Fire II 2020
- “Tiptoe” When Things Get Dark 2021
- “American Remake of a Japanese Ghost Story” There is No Death, and There are No Dead 2021
- “Uncoiling” Cosmic Horror Monthly, January Issue 2022
- “The Big Whimper” Weird World War IV 2022
- “Bitten by Himself” Screams from the Dark 2022
- “So Easy to Kill” Isolation: The Horror Anthology 2022

=== Other writing ===
- "Twenty-First Century Ghosts." Essay for Locus, May 2007
- "Quietly, Now." Essay for Erobos: The New Darkness #1, Summer 2007
- "Dark Star: The Michael Shea Experience." An introduction to The Autopsy & Other Tales, Centipede Press, 2008
- "Vistas of Evil Splendor." Introduction to The Darkly Splendid Realm by Richard Gavin Dark Regions Press 2009
- "Calling into the Darkness." Publishers Weekly essay 2010
- "Heart of the North." Introduction to Ballad of the Northland by Jason Barron 2010
- "Death's Head Blues." Introduction to Sin & ashes by Joseph S. Pulver Hippocampus 2010
- "No Escape." Introduction to The Ones that Got Away by Stephen Graham Jones Prime Books 2010
- "Stalking Through the Jungles of Night." Afterword to limited edition of Peter Straub's Koko Centipede Press 2010
- "In the Shadows of the Pines." Afterword to The Collected Stories of Karl Edward Wagner by Centipede Press 2011
- "Beyond Love, Sex, and the Heat Death of the Universe." Introduction to Engines of Desire, by Livia Llewellyn 2011
- "Babes in the Wilderness." Essay for Nightmare Magazine 2013
- "May Bury You." Essay for Weird Fiction Review 2014
- "A Stitch in Darkness." Introduction to Unseaming by Mike Allen 2014
- "Dig My Grave." Introduction to Burnt Black Suns by Simon Strantzas 2014
- "Waking the Titans." Introduction to Ana Kai Tangata by Scott Nicolay 2014
- "Shine On, Dark Star." Michael Shea tribute for Locus 2014
- "No Form Is Eternal." Michael Shea tribute for Lightspeed Magazine 2014
- "Eye of the Raven." Foreword for The New Black 2014
- "Diabolus Knocks." Foreword to The Case Against Satan Ray Russell, Penguin Classics edition 2015

== Adaptations ==
His story "-30-" was adapted into the 2018 film They Remain starring William Jackson Harper.
