= Ellen Datlow =

American editor and anthologist (born 1949)

- Datlow in 2026
- Born: December 31, 1949 (age 76)
- Occupations: Editor; anthologist
- Known for: The Best Horror of the Year
- Website: ellendatlow.com

Ellen Datlow (born December 31, 1949) is an American science fiction, fantasy, and horror editor and anthologist. She is a winner of the World Fantasy Award and the Bram Stoker Award (Horror Writers Association).

== Career ==
Datlow began her career working for Holt, Rinehart and Winston for three years, as well as doing a stint at Crown Publishing Group. She went on to be fiction editor at Omni magazine and Omni Online from 1981 through 1998, and edited the ten associated Omni anthologies. She co-edited the Year's Best Fantasy and Horror series from 1988 to 2008 (with Terri Windling until 2003, later with Gavin Grant and Kelly Link until the series ended). She was also editor of the webzine Event Horizon: Science Fiction, Fantasy, and Horror from 1998 to 1999, as well as Sci Fiction until it ceased publication on December 28, 2005.

Datlow has edited the anthologies Nebula Awards Showcase 2009, Darkness: Two Decades of Horror (2010), Hauntings (2013), Queen Victoria's Book of Spells (with Terri Windling, Tor Books, 2013), Lovecraft's Monsters (2014), The Cutting Room (2014), The Monstrous (2015), Nightmares (Tachyon Publications, 2016), The Doll Collection (2016), Mad Hatters and March Hares (2017), The Devil and the Deep (2018), Echoes: The Saga Anthology of Ghost Stories (2019), When Things Get Dark (2021), and Night & Day: Dreadful Dark/Merciless Sun (2025).

She now edits The Best Horror of the Year, published by Night Shade Books. This is an annual compendium of selected horror fiction and poetry published in the previous year. It has included work by notable writers including Laird Barron, Stephen Graham Jones, Michael Marshall Smith, Joe R. Lansdale, and Nicholas Royle.

== Awards and recognition ==
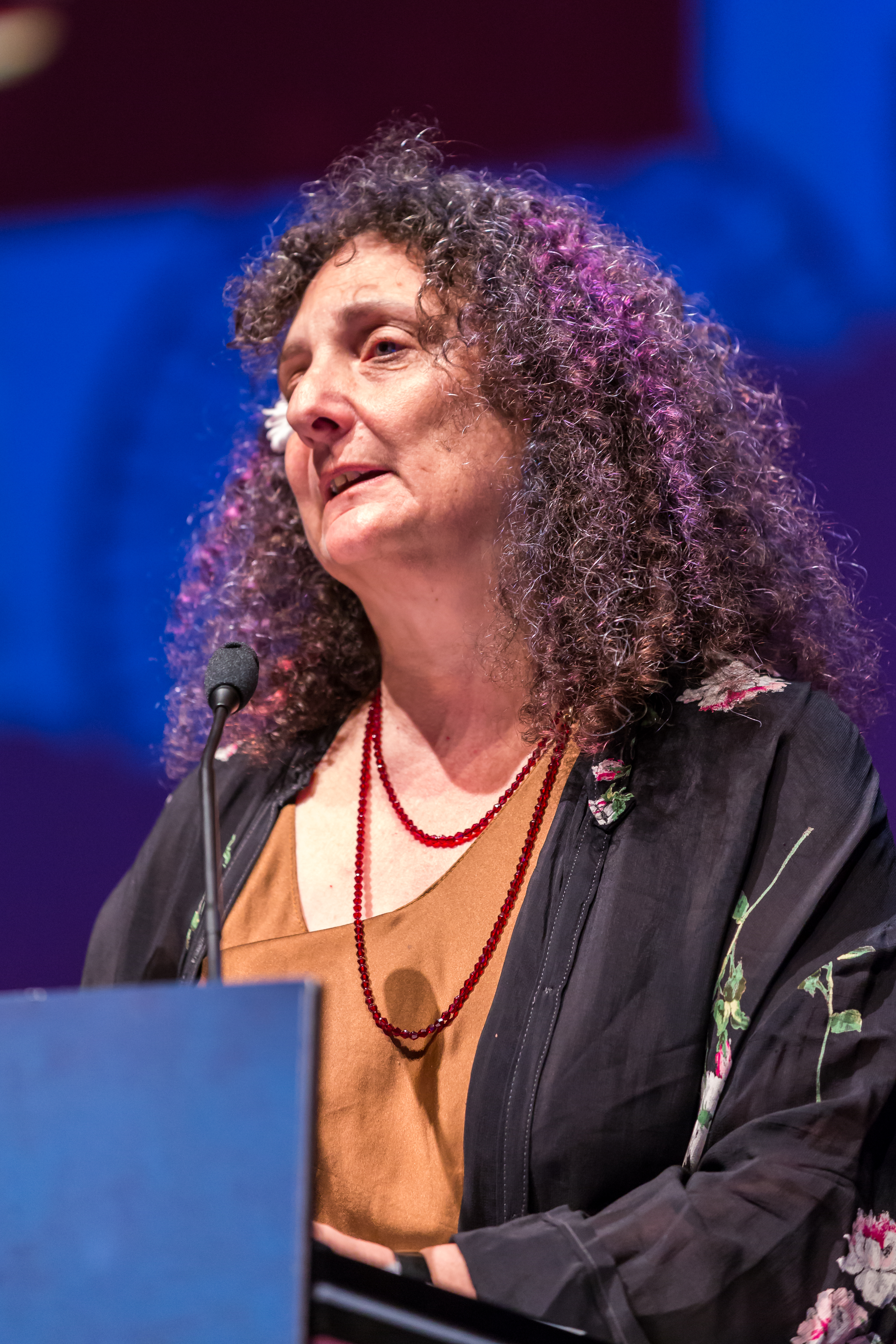
Datlow in 2017

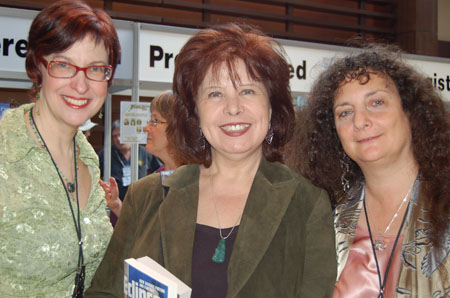
Delia Sherman, Nancy Kress, and Ellen Datlow, 2007

In 1992, Gahan Wilson wrote in an issue of Weird Tales that "Datlow is, book by book, magazine by magazine, showing herself to be one of those rare editors who, like Anthony Boucher, say, or Judith Merril, now and then enter this field and quietly change it from top to bottom for the better."

Datlow won the Hugo Award for Best Professional Editor in 2002 and 2005, and the Hugo Award for Best Short Form Editor in 2009, 2010, 2012, 2014, 2016, and 2017. Her editing work has also been recognized with five Bram Stoker Awards, ten World Fantasy Awards, two International Horror Guild Awards for Best Anthology, three Shirley Jackson Awards for Best Anthology, and twelve Locus Awards for Best Editor. In 2000, she was the editor guest of honor at the World Horror Convention. She was named recipient of the 2007 Karl Edward Wagner Award, given at the British Fantasy Convention, for "outstanding contribution to the genre".

In 2011, Datlow received the Lifetime Achievement Award by the Horror Writers Association. She has been a trustee of the Horror Writers Association since 2006 and a co-host of the Fantastic Fiction reading series at the KGB bar in New York City since 2000.

=== Selected list of awards ===
- 1989 World Fantasy Award for Best Anthology, The Year's Best Fantasy: First Annual Collection (with Terri Windling)
- 1990 World Fantasy Award for Best Anthology, The Year's Best Fantasy: Second Annual Collection (with Terri Windling)
- 1992 World Fantasy Award for Best Anthology, The Year's Best Fantasy and Horror: Fourth Annual Collection (with Terri Windling)
- 1995 World Fantasy Award for Best Anthology, Little Deaths
- 1995 World Fantasy Special Award, professional
- 2000 World Fantasy Award for Best Anthology, Silver Birch, Blood Moon (with Terri Windling)
- 2003 World Fantasy Award for Best Anthology, The Green Man (with Terri Windling)
- 2007 World Fantasy Award for Best Anthology, Salon Fantastique (with Terri Windling)
- 2008 World Fantasy Award for Best Anthology, Inferno
- 2010 Bram Stoker Award for Lifetime Achievement
- 2014 World Fantasy Award for Lifetime Achievement
- 2020 Hugo Award for Best Editor, Short Form
- 2020 Bram Stoker Award for Superior Achievement in an Anthology, Echoes: The Saga Anthology of Ghost Stories
