= Night Shade Books =

American specialty publishing imprint

- Founded: 1997
- Founder: Jason Williams
- Country of origin: United States
- Headquarters location: San Francisco
- Publication types: Books
- Fiction genres: science fiction, fantasy, and horror
- Owner(s): Skyhorse Publishing and Start Publishing
- Official website: www.nightshadebooks.com

Night Shade Books is an American, San Francisco–based imprint, formerly an independent publishing company, that specializes in science fiction, fantasy, and horror. Among its publications have been the U.S. edition of Iain M. Banks' novel The Algebraist, which was nominated for a Hugo Award, and Paolo Bacigalupi's novel The Windup Girl, which won several awards. The company was started in 1997 by Jason Williams, with Jeremy Lassen coming on board as a partner shortly after the company's founding. Night Shade won the 2003 World Fantasy Award (Non-Professional).

On July 9, 2010, the Science Fiction and Fantasy Writers of America (SFWA) placed Night Shade Books on probation after it admitted to, and apologized to authors for, contractual irregularities. On November 30, 2011, SFWA lifted the probation based on good behavior during the probationary period. However, an investigation was reopened when further complaints were submitted to SFWA the following year. Once Night Shade Books indicated that it was possibly facing bankruptcy, SFWA subsequently delisted Night Shade Books as a qualifying market around April 2013. Two interested parties, Skyhorse Publishing and Start Publishing, offered to buy out the contracts and continue Night Shade Books as an imprint of their respective companies. On June 3, 2013, the final details of the corporate acquisition were announced.

As of 2017, Night Shade Book's main office and sales office are in New York, and its distribution is through Simon & Schuster.
