= Technical writer =

Professional information communicator

Occupation
- Synonyms: Technical correspondent, Technical editor, Documentation writer, Medical writer, Technical journalist, Instructional writer, Technical content editor
- Activity sectors: Software, Technology, Manufacturing, Medical

Description
- Competencies: Analytical skills Critical thinking, AP or CMOS style, Third-person grammar, Procedural formatting (DITA)
- Fields of employment: NGOs, Manufacturing, Software development, Web development, Academic research, Private research, Medical research, Mechanical engineering, Electrical engineering, Civil engineering, Architecture, Aerospace, Military, Military-industrial complex, Adult education, Laboratories, Nuclear science, Economics, Construction, Land surveying, Industrial safety, Marketing, Financial services, Product development, Public works, Agricultural science, Patent law.
- Related jobs: Editor, Speechwriter, Screenwriter, Proofreader, Copy editor

A technical writer is a professional communicator whose task is to convey complex information in simple terms to an audience of the general public or a very select group of readers. Technical writers research and create information through a variety of delivery media (electronic, printed, audio-visual, and even touch). In most organizations, a technical writer serves as a trained expert in technical writing and not as an expert in their field of employment. This, of course, does not mean technical writers aren't expected to have, at the very least, a basic understanding of their subject matter. Technical writers generally acquire necessary industry terminology and field or product knowledge on the job, through working with Subject-Matter Experts (SMEs) and their own internal document research.

In larger organizations, a technical writer often works as a member of a technical writing team, but may also work independently at smaller organizations and in select roles where workloads are focused. Examples of popular technical writing include online help, manuals, white papers, design specifications, project plans, and software test plans. With the rise of e-learning, technical writers are increasingly hired to develop online training material to assist users.

According to the Society for Technical Communication (STC):

Technical writing is sometimes defined as simplifying the complex. Inherent in such a concise and deceptively simple definition is a whole range of skills and characteristics that address nearly every field of human endeavor at some level. A significant subset of the broader field of technical communication, technical writing involves communicating complex information to those who need it to accomplish some task or goal.

In other words, technical writers take advanced technical concepts and communicate them as clearly, accurately, and comprehensively as possible to their intended audience, ensuring that the work is accessible to its users.

Kurt Vonnegut described technical writers as:

...trained to reveal almost nothing about themselves in their writing. This makes them freaks in the world of writers, since almost all of the other ink-stained wretches in that world reveal a lot about themselves to the reader.

Engineers, scientists, and other professionals may also be involved in technical writing (developmental editing, proofreading, etc.), but are more likely to employ professional technical writers to develop, edit and format material, and follow established review procedures as a means delivering information to their audiences.

== History ==
According to the Society for Technical Communication (STC), the professions of technical communication and technical writing were first referenced around World War I, when technical documents became a necessity for military purposes. The job title emerged in the US during World War II, Although it was not until 1951 that the first "Help Wanted: Technical Writer" ad was published. In fact, the title "Technical Writer" was not added to the US Bureau of Labor Statistic's Occupational Employment Handbook until 2010. During the 1940s and 50s, technical communicators and writers were hired to produce documentation for the military, often including detailed instructions on new weaponry. Other technical communicators and writers were involved in developing documentation for new technologies that were developed around this time. According to O'Hara:

War was the most important driver of scientific and technological advance. The U.S. Army Medical Corps battled malaria in the jungles of Panama, the Chemical Corps pushed chemical advances in explosives and poisonous gases (and defenses against them), the Manhattan District of the Corps of Engineers literally made quantum leaps in the understanding of physics, and the Air Corps pioneered aviation design.

Since the early days of the profession, technical writers have worked in teams with a pool of other technical writers. To this day, most organizations still employ a team to produce and edit technical writing for an assigned product or service. As a member of a team, technical writers work independently to research their assignments. Regular one-on-one meetings with Subject Matter Experts (SMEs) and internal research references (e.g., mechanical drawings, specifications, BOMs, datasheets, etc.) provide the technical writer with the necessary checks to ensure a document's accuracy. Once the accuracy of a document has been reviewed and approved by the assigned SME, technical writers rely on their writing team to provide peer reviews. The peer review focuses exclusively on content format, style, and grammar standardization. The goal of the team's peer reviews are to ensure an organization's technical writing "speaks with one voice".

During World War II, one of the most important characteristics for technical writers was their ability to follow stringent government specifications for documents. After the war, the rise of new technology, such as the computer, allowed technical writers to work in other areas, producing "user manuals, quick reference guides, hardware installation manuals, and cheat sheets." After the war (1953–1961), technical communicators (including technical writers) became interested in "professionalizing" their field. According to Malone, technical communicators/writers did so by creating professional organizations, cultivating a "specialized body of knowledge" for the profession, imposing ethical standards on technical communicators, initiating a conversation about certifying practitioners in the field, and working to accredit education programs in the field.

The profession has continued to grow—according to O'Hara, the writing/editing profession, including technical writers, experienced a 22% increase in positions between the years 1994 and 2005. Modern-day technical writers work in a variety of contexts. Many technical writers work remotely using VPN or communicate with their team via videotelephony platforms such as Skype or Zoom. Other technical writers work in an office, but share content with their team through complex content management systems that store documents online. Technical writers may work on government reports, internal documentation, instructions for technical equipment, embedded help within software or systems, or other technical documents. As technology continues to advance, the array of possibilities for technical writers will continue to expand. Many technical writers are responsible for creating technical documentation for mobile applications or help documentation built within mobile or web applications. They may be responsible for creating content that will only be viewed on a hand-held device; much of their work will never be published in a printed booklet like technical documentation of the past.

=== Technical Writers and UX Design ===
Historically, technical writers, or technical and professional communicators, have been concerned with writing and communication. However, recently user experience (UX) design has become more prominent in technical and professional communications as companies look to develop content for a wide range of audiences and experiences.

The User Experience Professionals Association defines UX as “Every aspect of the user’s interaction with a product, service, or company that make up the user’s perception of the whole.” Therefore, “user experience design as a discipline is concerned with all the elements that together make up that interface, including layout, visual design, text, brand, sound, and interaction."

It is now an expectation that technical communication skills should be coupled with UX design. As Verhulsdonck, Howard, and Tham state “...it is not enough to write good content. According to industry expectations, next to writing good content, it is now also crucial to design good experiences around that content." Technical communicators must now consider different platforms such as social media and apps, as well as different channels like web and mobile.

As Redish explains, a technical communications professional no longer writes content but “writes around the interface” itself as user experience surrounding content is developed. This includes usable content customized to specific user needs, that addresses user emotions, feelings, and thoughts across different channels in a UX ecology.

Lauer and Brumberger further assert, “…UX is a natural extension of the work that technical communicators already do, especially in the modern technological context of responsive design, in which content is deployed across a wide range of interfaces and environments."

UX design is a product of both technical communication and the user identity. Effective UX design is configured to maximize usability according to unique user backgrounds, in a process called design ethnography. Design ethnography closely analyzes user culture through interviews and usability tests, in which the technical writer directly immerses themself in the user environment and gathers UX information from local users.

== Skill set ==
Technical writers must have a solid understanding of popular style guides, language, writing, research and revisioning. Additional skills often include:

- Business analysis
- CAD wireframe rendering
- Computer scripting
- Content management
- Content design
- Illustration/graphic design
- Indexing
- Information architecture
- Information design
- Localization/technical translation
- Teamwork
- Training
- E-learning
- User interfaces
- Video editing
- Website design/management
- Hypertext Markup Language (HTML)
- Usability testing
- Problem solving
- User experience design

A technical writer is never assigned the role of subject-matter expert (SME) by design. Instead, technical writers are assigned a narrow responsibility to provide a standardized format, grammar, and style. An engineer or scientist is generally assigned the separate role of subject-matter expert (SME). During a product's research and development phase, SMEs collect data and build outlines that will eventually be handed off to a technical writer for reference. The relationship relies on SME accuracy to work. When provided accurate information, a technical writer can then standardize the content to ensure the final document is clearly written and grammatically correct.

== Characteristics ==
Proficient technical writers have the ability to create, assimilate, and convey technical material in a concise and effective manner. They may specialize in a particular area but must have a good understanding of the products they describe. For example, API writers primarily work on API documents, while other technical writers specialize in electronic commerce, manufacturing, scientific, or medical material.

Technical writers gather information from many sources. Their information sources are usually scattered throughout an organization, which can range from developers to marketing departments.

According to Markel, useful technical documents are measured by eight characteristics: "honesty, clarity, accuracy, comprehensiveness, accessibility, conciseness, professional appearance, and correctness." Technical writers are focused on using their careful research to create effective documents that meet these eight characteristics.

== Roles and functions ==
To create effective technical documentation, the writer must analyze three elements that comprise the rhetorical situation of a particular project: audience, purpose, and context. These are followed by document design, which determines what the reader sees.

=== Audience analysis ===
Technical writers strive to simplify complex concepts or processes to maximize reader comprehension. The final goal of a particular document is to help readers find what they need, understand what they find, and use what they understand appropriately. To reach this goal, technical writers must understand how their audiences use and read documentation. An audience analysis at the outset of a document project helps define what an audience for a particular document requires.

When analyzing an audience the technical writer typically asks:

- Who is the intended audience?
- What are their demographic characteristics?
- What is the audience's role?
- How does the reader feel about the subject?
- How does the reader feel about the sender?
- What form does the reader expect?
- What is the audience's task?
- Why does the audience need to perform that task?
- What is the audience's knowledge level?
- What factors influence the situation?

Accurate audience analysis provides a set of guidelines that shape document content, design and presentation (online help system, interactive website, manual, etc.), and tone and knowledge level.

=== Purpose ===
A technical writer analyzes the purpose (or function) of a communication to understand what a document must accomplish. Determining if a communication aims to persuade readers to “think or act a certain way, enable them to perform a task, help them understand something, change their attitude,” etc., guides the technical writer on how to format their communication, and the kind of communication they choose (online help system, white paper, proposal, etc.).

=== Context ===
Context is the physical and temporal circumstances in which readers use communication—for example: at their office desks, in a manufacturing plant, during the slow summer months, or in the middle of a company crisis. Understanding the context of a situation tells the technical writer how readers use communication. This knowledge significantly influences how the writer formats communication. For example, if the document is a quick troubleshooting guide to the controls on a small watercraft, the writer may have the pages laminated to increase usable life.

=== Document design ===
Once the above information has been gathered, the document is designed for optimal readability and usability. According to one expert, technical writers use six design strategies to plan and create technical communication: arrangement, emphasis, clarity, conciseness, tone, and ethos.

Arrangement
The order and organization of visual elements so that readers can see their structure—how they cohere in groups, how they differ from one another, how they create layers and hierarchies. When considering arrangement technical writers look at how to use headings, lists, charts, and images to increase usability.

Emphasis
How a document displays important sections through prominence or intensity. When considering emphasis technical writers look at how they can show readers important sections, warning, useful tips, etc. through the use of placement, bolding, color, and type size.

Clarity
Strategies that “help the receiver decode the message, to understand it quickly and completely, and, when necessary, to react without ambivalence.” When considering clarity the technical writer strives to reduce visual noise, such as low contrast ratios, overly complex charts or graphs, and illegible font, all of which can hinder reader comprehension.

Conciseness
The "visual bulk and intricacy" of the design—for example, the number of headings and lists, lines and boxes, detail of drawings and data displays, size variations, ornateness, and text spacing. Technical writers must consider all these design strategies to ensure the audience can easily use the documents.

Tone
The sound or feel of a document. Document type and audience dictate whether the communication should be formal and professional, or lighthearted and humorous. In addition to language choice, technical writers set the tone of technical communication through the use of spacing, images, typefaces, etc.

Ethos
The degree of credibility that visual language achieves in a document. Technical writers strive to create professional and error-free documentation to establish credibility with the audience.

== Qualifications ==
Technical writers normally possess a mixture of technical and writing abilities. They typically have a degree or certification in a technical field, but may have one in journalism, business, or other fields. Many technical writers switch from another field, such as journalism—or a technical field such as engineering or science, often after learning important additional skills through technical communications classes.

== Methodology (document development life cycle) ==
To create a technical document, a technical writer must understand the subject, purpose, and audience. They gather information by studying existing material, interviewing SMEs, and often actually using the product. They study the audience to learn their needs and technical understanding level.

A technical publication's development life cycle typically consists of five phases, coordinated with the overall product development plan:

- Phase 1: Information gathering and planning
- Phase 2: Content specification
- Phase 3: Content development and implementation
- Phase 4: Production
- Phase 5: Evaluation

The document development life cycle typically consists of six phases (This changes organization to organization, how they are following).

1. Audience profiling (identify target audience)
2. User task analysis (analyze tasks and information based on the target audience)
3. Information architecture (design based on analysis, how to prepare document)
4. Content development (develop/prepare the document)
5. Technical and editorial reviews (review with higher level personnel—managers, etc.)
6. Formatting and publishing (publish the document).

This is similar to the software development life cycle.

Well-written technical documents usually follow formal standards or guidelines. Technical documentation comes in many styles and formats, depending on the medium and subject area. Printed and online documentation may differ in various ways, but still adhere to largely identical guidelines for prose, information structure, and layout. Usually, technical writers follow formatting conventions described in a standard style guide. In the US, technical writers typically use The Associated Press Stylebook or the Chicago Manual of Style (CMOS). Many companies have internal corporate style guides that cover specific corporate issues such as logo use, branding, and other aspects of corporate style. The Microsoft Manual of Style for Technical Publications is typical of these.

Engineering projects, particularly defense or aerospace-related projects, often follow national and international documentation standards—such as ATA100 for civil aircraft or S1000D for civil and defense platforms.

== Environment ==
Technical writers often work as part of a writing or project development team. Typically, the writer finishes a draft and passes it to one or more SMEs who conduct a technical review to verify accuracy and completeness. Another writer or editor may perform an editorial review that checks conformance to styles, grammar, and readability. This person may request for clarification or make suggestions. In some cases, the writer or others test the document on audience members to make usability improvements. A final production typically follows an inspection checklist to ensure the quality and uniformity of the published product.

The physical working environment of most company-employed technical writers typically entails an open office with desktop computers and individual desks. A technical writer's workspace is largely dependent on their industry. A 2018 Intercom census of mostly American technical communicators showed that the majority of respondents worked in technology and IT. Prevalence of various industries in technical writing is correlated to geographic location, and the industries that are most common in certain regions of the world. A study of technical communication careers in Europe showed that the majority of technical communicators work in IT.

=== Remote Work during and after the COVID-19 pandemic ===
In the wake of the stay-at-home suggestions from the World Health Organization in March 2020, due to the COVID-19 pandemic, employees around the world experienced a shift in work environment from in-person to remote and/or virtual. As of 2023, after social distancing policies have been loosened, many organizations have decided to maintain the option for employees to work remotely. In the particular case of professional technical writers, this change forces an alternative approach to communication with subject matter experts, colleagues, and project managers who are directly involved in the technical communication process. Employees who work remotely typically rely on virtual, at times asynchronous, communication with collaborators, and spend working hours either at home or in an isolated office.

== Career growth ==
There is no single standard career path for technical writers, but they may move into project management over other writers. A writer may advance to a senior technical writer position, handling complex projects or a small team of writers and editors. In larger groups, a documentation manager might handle multiple projects and teams.

Technical writers may also gain expertise in a particular technical domain and branch into related forms, such as software quality analysis or business analysis. A technical writer who becomes a subject matter expert in a field may transition from technical writing to work in that field. Technical writers commonly produce training for the technologies they document—including classroom guides and e-learning—and some transition to specialize as professional trainers and instructional designers.

Technical writers with expertise in writing skills can join printed media or electronic media companies, potentially providing an opportunity to make more money or improved working conditions.

In April 2021, the U.S Department of Labor expected technical writer employment to grow seven percent from 2019 to 2029, slightly faster than the average for all occupations. They expect job opportunities, especially for applicants with technical skills, to be good. The BLS also noted that the expansion of "scientific and technical products" and the need for technical writers to work in "Web-based product support" will drive increasing demand.

As of May 2022, the average annual pay for a freelance technical writer in the United States is $70,191 according to ZipRecruiter.

== Notable technical writers ==
- Ted Chiang, American author of short stories including Story of Your Life (1998) and The Merchant and the Alchemist's Gate (2007), was a technical writer in the software industry as late as July 2002.
- William Gaddis, author of J R (1975) and A Frolic of His Own (1994), was employed as a technical writer for a decade and a half for such companies as Pfizer and Eastman Kodak after the poor reception of his first novel, The Recognitions (1955).
- Michael Halvorson, American technology writer and historian, is a university professor and the author of 40 books related to computer programming, using PC software, and the history of technology.
- Dan Jones, university professor and a fellow of the Society for Technical Communication.
- Chuck Palahniuk, American author of Fight Club, worked as a diesel mechanic and automotive technical writer prior to his career as a novelist.
- Robert M. Pirsig, author of Zen and the Art of Motorcycle Maintenance: An Inquiry into Values (ZAMM) (1974), wrote technical manuals for IBM while working on the bestselling book.
- Thomas Pynchon, American author of The Crying of Lot 49 (1966), Gravity's Rainbow (1973), and Mason & Dixon (1997), among others, wrote his first novel, V. (1963), while employed as a technical writer for Boeing from 1960 to 1963.
- George Saunders, American author of Tenth of December: Stories (2013) as well as other short story collections, essays, and novellas, wrote his first short story collection, CivilWarLand in Bad Decline (1996), while working as a technical writer and geophysical engineer for Radian International, an environmental engineering firm in Rochester, New York.
- Amy Tan, American author of The Joy Luck Club (1989), The Bonesetter's Daughter (2001), and other critically acclaimed novels. Tan began writing fiction novels while she was a technical writer.
- Richard Wilbur, American poet. Worked for Boeing, as he mentioned in conversation.
- Marion Winik, American author and essayist, worked as a technical writer from 1984-1994 at Unison-Tymlabs, Austin, Texas.

== Similar titles ==
Technical writers can have various job titles, including technical communicator, information developer, technical content developer or technical documentation specialist. In the United Kingdom and some other countries, a technical writer is often called a technical author or knowledge author.

- Technical communicator
- Technical author
- Tech writer
- Technical content developer
- Technical information developer
- Technical journalist
- Content developer
- Content designer
- Web content developer
- Information architect
- Information engineer
- Information designer
- Information developer
- API documentation specialist
- Adult learning content developer
- Documentation engineer
- Documentation specialist
- Document management specialist
- Documentation manager
- Text engineer

== See also ==
- Collaborative editing
- European Association for Technical Communication
- Software documentation
