= Magic for Beginners =

Magic for Beginners may refer to:

- Magic for Beginners (short story collection), an anthology of stories by Kelly Link,
- "Magic for Beginners" (novella), an award-winning novella by Kelly Link
