= Spiderhead =

2022 American film by Joseph Kosinski

- Promotional release poster
- Directed by: Joseph Kosinski
- Screenplay by: Rhett Reese; Paul Wernick
- Based on: "Escape from Spiderhead" by George Saunders
- Produced by: Eric Newman; Chris Hemsworth; Rhett Reese; Paul Wernick; Agnes Chu; Geneva Wasserman; Tommy Harper; Jeremy Steckler
- Starring: Chris Hemsworth; Miles Teller; Jurnee Smollett
- Cinematography: Claudio Miranda
- Edited by: Stephen Mirrione
- Music by: Joseph Trapanese
- Production companies: Grand Electric; The New Yorker Studios; Condé Nast Entertainment (uncredited); Screen Arcade (uncredited); Reese Wernick Productions (uncredited)
- Distributed by: Netflix
- Release dates: June 11, 2022 (Sydney); June 17, 2022 (United States)
- Running time: 107 minutes
- Country: United States
- Language: English
- Budget: $100 million

Spiderhead is a 2022 American science fiction psychological thriller film directed by Joseph Kosinski and written by Rhett Reese and Paul Wernick, based on the 2010 dystopian short story "Escape from Spiderhead" by George Saunders. The film stars Chris Hemsworth, Miles Teller, and Jurnee Smollett. The story follows inmates in a luxurious prison who participate in experiments involving mind-altering drugs. Principal photography took place in Australia in 2020.

Spiderhead premiered in Sydney on June 11, 2022, and was released on Netflix on June 17. The film received mixed reviews from critics.

== Plot ==
Spiderhead is a state of the art penitentiary experimenting with the effects of research chemicals. The test subjects, technically prisoners of the state, are volunteers for the project aiming to reduce their sentence time. The program is overseen by the sympathetic and hospitable Steve Abnesti, along with his assistant Mark. The prisoners have their own rooms, do chores, and are free to roam without guard supervision. The subjects go through daily test runs of various drugs, all of which alter their emotions and their perceptions of their surroundings.

Inmate Jeff, still reeling from having killed his friend whilst drunk driving, is given N-40, a "love drug", which distorts his senses and drives him to have sex with two of his fellow inmates. Steve asks him to choose which one of them to give Darkenfloxx, a drug that induces intense fear and psychological pain. He declines to choose, claiming he feels nothing in particular for either one of them after the effects of the love drug had worn off. Mark helps Steve administer some N-40 to himself.

The next day, Steve brings Jeff into the observation room and tells him that the "higher-ups" have decided that the younger of the two women, Heather, must be injected with a dose, though it will only last 5 minutes. Jeff reluctantly agrees, and to his horror, Heather commits suicide while on the Darkenfloxx after she damages her MobiPak, the device that administers the drugs. This causes Mark to doubt their work in the facility. As Steve rushes out of the projection room, he drops his keys. Jeff unlocks Steve's desk compartment, discovering that there are no "higher-ups": the prison is run by Abnesti Pharmaceuticals, Steve's company. The drugs were named from a bingo card.

Steve and Jeff get high together on a laughing drug, as Steve also has a MobiPak installed. Steve tells Jeff that his father abandoned him as a child. Jeff confesses to Lizzy, an inmate he is close with, that he not only killed his friend in the car accident but his girlfriend as well. Lizzy hugs him and they kiss. Steve notices Jeff's feelings for Lizzy. Mark becomes doubtful of Steve's motives, and he breaks down when Jeff confronts him.

When Steve asks Jeff to administer Darkenfloxx to Lizzy, Jeff takes control of Steve's MobiPak, reveals that Mark has spiked his Mobipak with Darkenfloxx, and forces him to admit the true goal of the program: testing a compliance drug, B-6. The other drugs are merely side projects being used to put B-6 to the ultimate test: whether or not they would harm their love when commanded to. The entire time inmates had been consenting to the various tests, they had really been under the influence of the obedience drug. In addition, Steve informs Jeff that he had in fact finished his sentence seven months previously, while Lizzy's appeal for release had passed the previous week. Jeff forces Steve to open the door of the main entrance to free Lizzy and then tries to order him to hand over the pocket knife. Steve resists the order (as complying would be killing the project, "the only thing he has ever loved"), and instead takes his phone and enables all four vials of Darkenfloxx in Lizzy's MobiPak, causing her to behave hysterically and attempt suicide. The two fight for control and Jeff is able to disarm Steve, damaging his MobiPak in the process. Jeff rushes to save Lizzy, successfully removes the vials of Darkenfloxx and tells her he loves her, but Steve gets up and orders the other inmates to apprehend Jeff and Lizzy. They are able to escape from Spiderhead after overpowering some of the other inmates and locking the main door behind them. Mark and the police are now approaching the island as Steve escapes on his floatplane, but he joyously crashes into a mountain as he is now high off of his damaged MobiPak. Meanwhile, Jeff and Lizzy take the remaining motorboat and escape.

In a voice-over, Jeff comments that no drug can bestow self-forgiveness; instead it must be worked on and chosen.

== Cast ==
- Chris Hemsworth as Steve Abnesti
- Miles Teller as Jeff
- Jurnee Smollett as Lizzy
- Mark Paguio as Mark Verlaine
- Tess Haubrich as Heather
- Angie Milliken as Sarah
- Stephen Tongun as Ray
- Daniel Reader as Ryan
- Sam Delich as Adam
- BeBe Bettencourt as Emma
- Joey Vieira as Miguel
- Ron Smyck as Dave
- Nathan Jones as Rogan

== Production ==
=== Development ===
"Escape from Spiderhead" was first published in The New Yorker in 2010, and in author George Saunders's collection of short stories Tenth of December in 2013. A film adaptation was announced in February 2019 with Joseph Kosinski set to direct from a screenplay written by Rhett Reese and Paul Wernick. In September 2020, Chris Hemsworth, Miles Teller and Jurnee Smollett joined the cast. Teller and Kosinski previously worked together on Top Gun: Maverick, the sequel to 1986 film Top Gun.

=== Filming ===
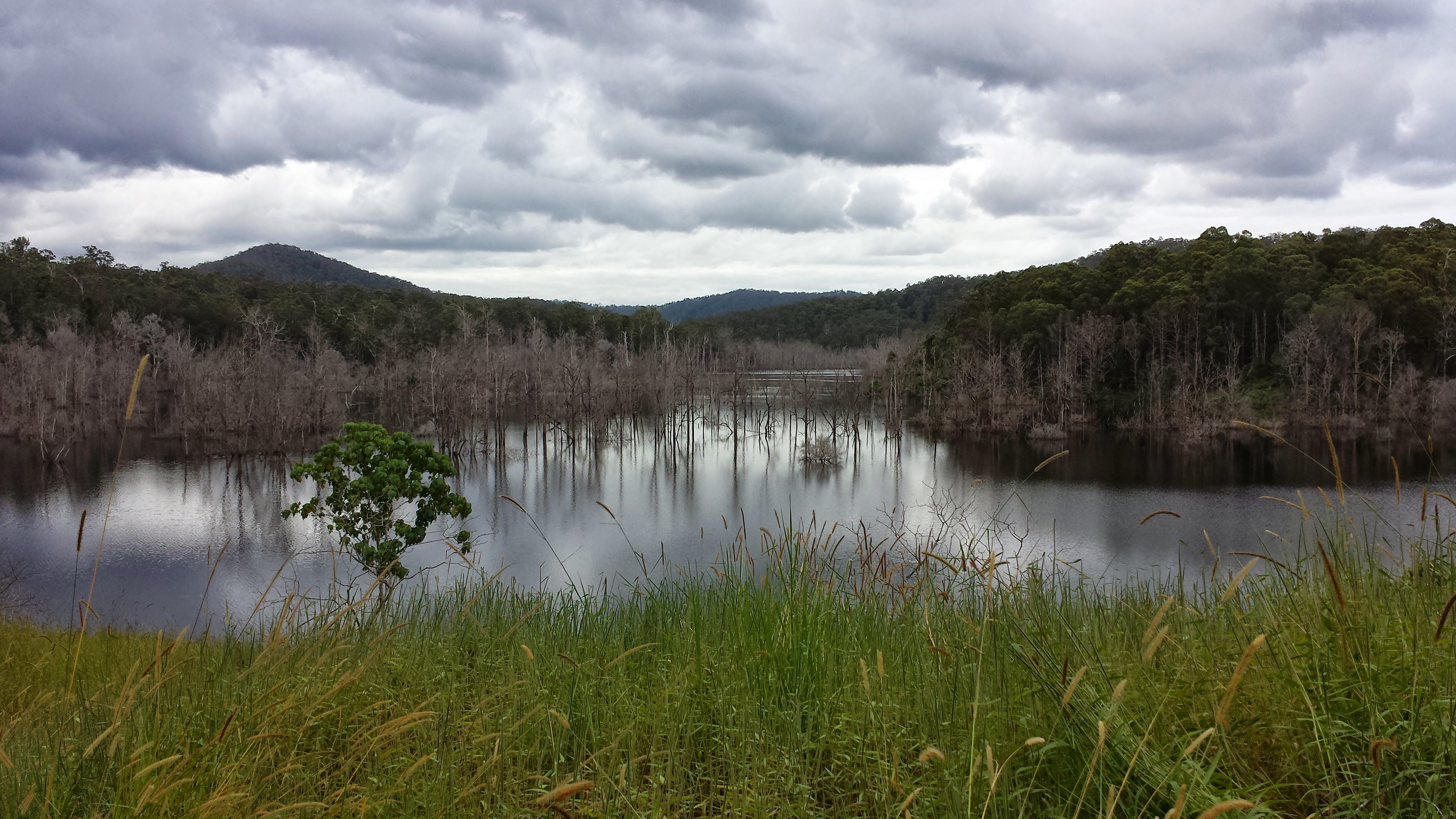
Filming took place at the Hinze Dam in Queensland, Australia

Principal photography commenced in early November 2020 in Queensland, Australia, in November 2020 following a AU$21.58 million investment from the Australian Government, shared with the production of Pieces of Her (lured to Sydney from British Columbia, Canada), to boost the national economy during the COVID-19 pandemic. Queensland Premier Annastacia Pałaszczuk said the production would create 360 local jobs and be worth around AUD$47 million to the local economy.

Locations for filming included the Gold Coast, Darlington, as well as popular tourist destination the Whitsundays. Producer Tommy Harper commented on the locations, “The great thing about this area is you can be on the beach, you can do waterwork, you can be in the desert, you could be in the country and feel like you’re in Texas, you can be in a rainforest and feel like you’re in Hawaii.” Filming also took place at Hinze Dam and Tallebudgera Valley.

== Release ==
As part of a video and letter to its shareholders in April 2021, Netflix's co-chief executive officer and chief content officer, Ted Sarandos, confirmed that the film was expected to premiere in the fourth quarter of 2021. In April 2022, the film was confirmed to be scheduled for release on June 17, 2022. The world premiere was held at The Entertainment Quarter in Sydney, Australia, on June 11, 2022.

== Reception ==
On the review aggregator website Rotten Tomatoes, 39% of 152 critics' reviews are positive, with an average rating of 5.2/10. The website's consensus reads: "Spiderhead's top-shelf cast and well-written source material are almost enough to compensate for its frequent failure to live up to its potential." Metacritic, which uses a weighted average, assigned the film a score of 54 out of 100, based on 34 critics, indicating "mixed or average" reviews. Nick Allen of RogerEbert.com gave it 2 out of 4 stars, writing that "it starts with promise", but is "pseudo-heady sci-fi stuff that treats its most intriguing elements like an afterthought."
