= In Persuasion Nation =

Collection of George Saunders short stories written 1995-2005

- US release cover
- Author: George Saunders
- Cover artist: Rodrigo Corral
- Language: English
- Publisher: Riverhead Books
- Publication date: April 20, 2006
- Publication place: United States
- Media type: Print (hardcover)
- Pages: 240 p.
- ISBN: 1-59448-922-X

In Persuasion Nation is short story writer George Saunders’s third full length short story collection. Composed of 12 stories originally published between 1999 and 2005, the collection incorporates elements of satire and science fiction and deals with themes of discontent in turn-of-the-millennium America. The collection has stories that appeared in different forms in The New Yorker, Harper's, Esquire, and McSweeney's. As a whole, the collection was a finalist for the 2006 Story Prize.

== Contents ==
Story	Originally published in	Year
"I CAN SPEAK!™"	The New Yorker	1999
"My Flamboyant Grandson"	The New Yorker	2002
"Jon"	The New Yorker	2003
"My Amendment"	The New Yorker	2004
"The Red Bow"	Esquire	2003
"Christmas" -- Original title: "Chicago Christmas, 1984"	The New Yorker	2003
"Adams"	The New Yorker	2004
"93990" -- Originally published as Part IV of "Four Institutional Monologues"	McSweeney's	2000
"Brad Carrigan, American"	Harper's	2005
"In Persuasion Nation"	Harper's	2005
"Bohemians"	The New Yorker	2004
"CommComm"	The New Yorker	2005

== Reception ==
Reviewing the collection in The New York Times, Adam Begley found irony in Saunders' love for satirizing brands and the way his writing style had itself become a brand: "A dedicated satirist, he has made the buying and selling of packaged experience a favorite target of his bitter wit. And yet with his third collection of stories, "In Persuasion Nation," he's peddling a line of signature goods. Expertly made, unmistakably his, they'll be consumed with gusto by the loyal customers who enjoyed "CivilWarLand in Bad Decline" and "Pastoralia." It's the kind of ironic twist he delights in: George Saunders, sworn enemy of commodification, is in danger of becoming a dependable brand name."

In Salon, Laura Miller wrote, "When he's firing on all cylinders, no one beats George Saunders at rendering the comic nightmare of life as a wage slave in contemporary America." A review in The Nation further focused on Saunders' original style: "Saunders’s laughs are a cover, a diversion, beneath which reside some profoundly serious intentions regarding the morality of how we live and the power of love and immanent death to transform us into vastly better creatures than we could otherwise hope to be. These are the biggest intentions an artist can have."

A writer for Kirkus Reviews argued, “Though much of the fiction is slapstick funny in a dark, deadpan way, a spiritual undercurrent courses through the work, as desire and suffering feed on each other, and God may be just another pitchman or empty promise. Where many short stories at the creative vanguard seem to bear minimal relation to the world at large, Saunders’s work is as effective as social commentary as it is at exploring the frontiers of fiction.” A more moderately positive review appeared in Publishers Weekly. The writer found stories such as “93990” and “My Amendment” tedious, but also stated that “Saunders's vital theme—the persistence of humanity in a vacuous, nefarious marketing culture of its own creation—comes through with subtlety and fresh turns.”

== Awards, honors and other appearances ==
- "The Red Bow" won the 2004 National Magazine Award for Fiction. It was also a finalist for the Bram Stoker Award. It was also reprinted in The Year's Best Fantasy and Horror: Seventeenth Annual Collection, edited by Ellen Datlow, Gavin J. Grant and Kelly Link.
- "Bohemians" appeared in the 2005 edition The Best American Short Stories.
- "My Flamboyant Grandson" was nominated for the 2003 Locus Award for Best Short Story.
- "93990" was reprinted in The Secret History of Science Fiction, edited by James Patrick Kelly and John Kessel.
- "Jon" was reprinted in Science Fiction: The Best of 2003, edited by Karen Haber and Jonathan Strahan.
- "CommComm" won the World Fantasy Award for Short Fiction, and was reprinted in Fantasy: The Best of the Year: 2006, edited by Rich Horton.
