= A Swim in a Pond in the Rain =

2021 book by George Saunders

- Author: George Saunders
- Language: English
- Publisher: Random House
- Publication date: January 12, 2021
- Publication place: United States
- Pages: 432
- ISBN: 9781984856036

A Swim in a Pond in the Rain (subtitled In Which Four Russians Give a Master Class on Writing, Reading, and Life) is a 2021 book of didactic literary analysis by the American author and professor George Saunders, based on a course that he teaches at Syracuse University. It contains the text of seven short stories by four Russian authors, accompanied by essays by Saunders.

== Content ==
Since 1997 Saunders has taught a class on short story writing at Syracuse University, on which he based A Swim in a Pond in the Rain. The book covers seven short stories by Russian authors, which are printed in full alongside short essays by Saunders discussing their content and context.

The book contains the following short stories:

- "In the Cart", "The Darling", and "Gooseberries" by Anton Chekhov, translated by Avrahm Yarmolinsky
- "The Singers" (from A Sportsman's Sketches) by Ivan Turgenev, translated by David Magarshack
- "Master and Man" (transl. Aylmer and Louise Maude) and "Alyosha the Pot" (transl. Clarence Brown) by Leo Tolstoy
- "The Nose" by Nikolai Gogol, translated by Mary Struve

== Publication and reception ==
A Swim in a Pond in the Rain was published by Random House on January 12, 2021. The title of the book is drawn from a scene in Chekhov's story "Gooseberries".

Parul Sehgal of the New York Times wrote that Saunders "offers one of the most accurate and beautiful depictions of what it is like to be inside the mind of the writer that I've ever read". Kirkus Reviews wrote that while the book is modeled on Saunders' university class, "readers need not be familiar with Russian literature to find this plan richly rewarding." Laura Miller of Slate was more critical, writing "it's hard to see how the voice that Saunders became famous for might have been inspired by any of the stories he extols in A Swim in a Pond in the Rain, except for "The Nose," the story he does the weakest job of explicating."
