= Luminous (novel) =

2025 novel by Silvia Park

- Author: Silvia Park
- Cover artist: Alex Merto
- Language: English
- Genre: Science fiction
- Set in: Korea
- Publisher: Simon & Schuster (US); Magpie, an imprint of Oneworld Publications (UK)
- Publication date: March 11, 2025
- Pages: 400
- ISBN: 9781668021668

Luminous is a 2025 science fiction novel by Silvia Park. It follows three siblings, two human and one robotic, in a near-future reunified Korea. The novel received critical praise for its exploration of the nature of humanity with relationship to robots.

== Plot ==
In a reunified Korea, robots are common. Legally, they are treated as property; however, some people consider them to be more akin to pets or even members of their family. A disabled eleven-year-old girl named Ruijie visits a scrapyard, where she finds a robot named Yoyo. Yoyo appears to be a young boy and is exceptionally realistic, though he is missing a leg and his battery is dying. The two become friends; Ruijie plans to rescue him from the scrapyard.

Yoyo was originally designed by Cho Yosep, a famous roboticist. Yoyo was raised alongside the other Cho children, Jun and Morgan, as their older sibling. One day, Yoyo disappeared; Jun and Morgan believe him to be permanently lost.

In the present, Jun works for the Robot Crimes division. Jun is a transgender man who was severely injured by an IED during the Reunification War; the majority of his body was replaced by bionic augmentations. Jun and his partner investigate a missing child robot named Eli. Morgan now works for Imagine Friends, a robotics company. Jun visits Morgan and meets her lover Stephen, a robot whom she manufactured herself. Imagine Friends is about to release a new model of child robot called Boy X. Morgan has secretly designed Boy X based on Yoyo.

Ruijie and Yoyo befriend Taewon, a young North Korean refugee. Taewon’s uncle Wonsuk is revealed to be Eli’s kidnapper. Jun arrests Wonsuk for Eli’s disappearance. Wonsuk implies that Eli was sold to Mr. Mo, a dating guru. Without physical evidence, Wonsuk is released.

Morgan breaks up with Stephen and asks him to be her friend. Stephen cannot accept this; he begins editing his own memories to forget the breakup. Later, Jun and Stephen meet at a bar to discuss Mr. Mo. The two have sex. Stephen begins posing as human to infiltrate Mr. Mo’s dating class.

Wonsuk kidnaps Yoyo. Wonsuk and Mr. Mo run an illegal robot fighting ring, also called a rage cage. In this event, humans pay to torture and destroy robots. During the event, Mr. Mo attacks Taewon and Yoyo, assuming that they are a pair of child robots. Stephen is in attendance, still posing as human. Yoyo hacks Stephen, sending him away. Yoyo then attacks Mr. Mo, revealing that he possesses previously secret military weapons technology. Later, Ruijie sneaks into the rage cage, where she finds an injured Eli. Ruijie and Eli return to the school. Yoyo comforts Eli as she shuts down.

Jun is called to the site of the rage cage, where the police have found Wonsuk’s body. Wonsuk has been beaten to death, leaving Taewon without a caretaker. Jun finds Eli’s body; her memories have been erased. Jun plugs into Eli’s brain, receiving a copy of her memories and revealing Yoyo as Mr. Mo’s assailant. The police department realizes that Boy X is releasing that very day. Because Boy X is physically identical to the original Yoyo, identifying the assailant will become almost impossible.

A flashback reveals that Yoyo was given to the military by Cho Yosep. Six months after his deployment, the original Yoyo was destroyed in combat. The Yoyo that has met Ruijie has access to all the memories of the original Yoyo, but claims to be a different being.

Yoyo, Ruijie, Taewon, Jun, Morgan, and Yosep converge at the Imagine Friends celebration to launch Boy X. Morgan downloads Stephen’s memories and realizes that he was the one who killed Wonsuk. Morgan blames herself for Stephen’s actions. She returns to her apartment, where she finds Stephen. They discuss her creation of him, as well as the meaning of humanity. She wakes the next morning to find him gone. Yoyo and Ruijie discuss death. Ruijie's illness is terminal, and she only expects to survive another few years. Yoyo’s battery dies and he begins to shut down. In virtual reality, Yoyo contacts Jun, showing that his consciousness survived.

== Major themes ==
Diana Arterian of Literary Hub wrote that the novel "starkly illustrate[s] how the deep anxieties and prejudices that define humanity will be only thrown into deeper relief in a future with robots." The novel explores the modern treatment of women. Male characters hurt robots for pleasure; all of these robots are female. In another scene, a woman robot clerk is coded to keep her eyes downcast and meek, indicating subservience. The novel blurs the boundary between humans and robots, particularly in the characters of Ruijie and Jun.

In an interview with nb. Magazine, Park stated that the novel was "a Peter Pan story." Just as author J. M. Barrie lost his older brother, the character of Yoyo reflects the idea of a "boy who couldn't grow up." In the same interview, Park also commented on the novel's setting in a reunified Korea. Park stated that "the novel’s central conceit—the mourning of a lost sibling—paralleled South Korea’s own loss. We have always been haunted by the North, which still exists beyond the border but remains a ghost to us..."

== Background ==
Park originally conceived of the novel as a children's book.

In an interview with The Nod, Park cited manga series Astro Boy and English author Susanna Clarke as influencing the novel, also citing a paper written by Park's father on the film I, Robot.

== Reception and awards ==
Abigail Nussbaum of Locus Magazine called the novel an "early contender for one of the best science fiction novels of the year" and wrote that it stands up to classic works in the genre, including Do Androids Dream of Electric Sheep? and A.I. Artificial Intelligence. Nussbaum further compared the character of Yoyo to Peter Pan, "the boy who can’t grow up, passing from one generation of children to the next, but always remaining fundamentally unlike them." Nussbaum praised the novel for its portrayal of robots and its exploration whether they should be treated as human.

Chris Kluwe of Lightspeed Magazine agreed that the book would be an awards contender, stating that "Park has written something awe-inspiring, in every sense of the word." Kluwe praised the prose, stating that "as a writer I was humbled and inspired by how magnificently the craft was executed." The review concluded that "Luminous is grotesque, it is triumphant, it is horrifying, it is transcendent, and you really, really should read it."

Henry Bankhead of Library Journal gave the novel a starred review, calling it a "momentous tour de force" that "overtops existing works on robots by leaps and bounds." The review further stated that the question of whether or not robots have humanity is ostensibly ignored; allows the narrative to become "a meditation on and an illustration of human and robot relationships in which it is difficult to distinguish between them." Kirkus Reviews also gave the novel a starred review. The review praised the robust worldbuilding, while criticizing the "unnecessary withholding of information early on, as well as an overwhelming number of complications." The review was also critical of the novel's structural choices and overlarge cast. Despite the flaws of the first half of the novel, the review concluded that the second half made up for this. The review praised Park's ambition, as well as the "big philosophical questions it asks about the nature of God, souls, humanity, politics, power, purpose, consciousness, memory, death, and, of course, love."

Writing in The Guardian, Adam Roberts commented on the contrast between Ruijie's story and that of the other major plot threads. Noting that the novel began as a children's book, Roberts felt that there was a discrepancy between the tone of the story as it related to the younger and older characters. The review described the tonal shift as awkward. Nevertheless, Roberts felt that it could reflect both the novel's treatment of hybridization and "cyborgification", as well as Korean unification. Roberts stated that the novel could be compared to Klara and the Sun, but "more streetwise", and was in dialogue with "Supertoys Last All Summer Long" by Brian Aldiss. Roberts had some critiques, noting that the book "betrays some roughness. It is too long... The pacing is uneven, the plotting a little messy." Despite this, the review concluded that Park is a "major new voice in SF."

Awards and honors
Year	Award	Category	Result	Ref.
2025	BSFA Award	Novel	Longlisted	
2025	Los Angeles Times Book Prize	Science Fiction, Fantasy, and Speculative Fiction	Won	
2025	Otherwise Award	—	Won	
2026	Arthur C. Clarke Award	—	Shortlisted	
2026	Dublin Literary Award	—	Nominated (Note: The first round of recognized titles are called "nominees". Six of those nominees, not including this work, were later shortlisted. One was chosen as the eventual winner.)	
2026	Locus Award	First Novel	Finalist	

== Adaptations ==
In 2022, film production company Media Res announced that it had purchased the adaptation rights to the novel before its publication, with the intention of creating a television series.
