= The Book of Love (Link novel) =

2024 novel by Kelly Link

- First edition cover
- Author: Kelly Link
- Language: English
- Genre: fantasy, horror, supernatural
- Publisher: Random House
- Publication date: February 13, 2024
- Publication place: United States
- Media type: Hardcover
- Pages: 640
- ISBN: 9780812996586

The Book of Love is a 2024 novel by American author Kelly Link. Set in the fictional small coastal town of Lovesend, Massachusetts in December of 2014, the novel follows four teenagers who return from the dead and must navigate magical challenges to remain among the living. The Book of Love is Link's first novel.

The novel was featured on the New York Times list of "The Best Science Fiction and Fantasy Novels of 2024", compiled by Amal El-Mohtar.

== Plot ==
Three teenagers—Laura, Daniel, and Mohammed (Mo)—vanish from their Massachusetts shore town of Lovesend and are presumed dead. One year later, they magically reappear in their high school music teacher Mr. Anabin's classroom. Anabin reveals that they have spent the past year in the realm of the mysterious Bogomil, between life and death. To fully return to life, they and another person, Bowie, who escaped with them, must enter a magical competition where only two of the four can remain among the living—the other two must return to Bogomil's realm.

When the teenagers return to their homes, they discover their families have been bewitched into believing they were not dead but studying music in Ireland for the year. The teenagers now possess miraculous abilities: they can change the weather and transform into animals.

The story follows their quest to discover how they died and learn to use their magical powers. They face opposition from the faded, malevolent goddess Malo Mogge, who arrives searching for a lost precious object that alternates between appearing as a cup and a ring. Anabin and Bogomil are revealed to be trapped in a game against each other while also playing against their former mistress, Malo Mogge, and her other servants.

As the teenagers perform magical tasks, the novel explores their personal struggles: Laura dreams of musical stardom and feuds with her sister Susannah; Daniel serves as the caring eldest brother to his mixed-race siblings while being pathologically ambitionless; and Mo, a gay orphan and one of the few Black residents of Lovesend, grieves for his beloved grandmother, a romance novelist who died while he was in the realm of death.

The teenagers eventually learn that the world beyond contains a series of doors, each guarded by two sentinels and requiring special keys. They ultimately rebel against the constraints imposed by Anabin and Bogomil and work to overthrow Malo Mogge, who threatens to destroy Lovesend in her search for her magical key lost in an occult ritual centuries ago.

== Characters ==
- Mohammed (Mo): A gay teenager who writes operas, one of the few Black residents of Lovesend.
- Daniel: The eldest brother in a large family, musically talented but deliberately unambitious.
- Laura: An aspiring singer-songwriter who dreams of stardom.
- Bowie: A shape-shifting former servant of Malo Mogge who returns with the teenagers from Bogomil's realm.
- Malo Mogge: A tyrannical moon goddess seeking her lost magical key.
- Thomas: Malo Mogge's servant, who has unfinished business with Bowie.
- Anabin: The teenagers' music teacher, revealed to be one of Malo Mogge's servants.
- Bogomil: Guardian of the realm of death, also a servant of Malo Mogge.

== Themes ==
In his review for Spectator, Philip Womack noted that interpersonal relationships serve as the emotional foundation of the story and pointed out that the narrative draws upon hero's journey conventions. Gary K. Wolfe at Locus pointed out that the story focused on the complexities and challenges inherent in different forms of love, including romantic relationships, sibling dynamics, intergenerational bonds, friendships, mentorship, and creative partnerships. Gabino Iglesias for NPR praised Link's ability to explore themes of mourning, human resilience, adaptability, and fundamental questions about the nature of existence.

=== Storytelling and writing ===
The novel operates as a meta-narrative that examines the craft and significance of storytelling itself. The narrative structure incorporates multiple layers of storytelling, weaving together memory-driven passages and psychological explorations that reveal the inner lives of its characters. Through Mo's grandmother Maryanne, a prolific author who produced 73 books over four decades, Link explores how writing serves as both economic sustenance and a means of providing care. Maryanne's biography becomes a vehicle for examining the complex position of Black women writers in the publishing industry, particularly those who achieve commercial success writing about white protagonists.

=== Magic as social commentary ===
Link's approach to magic serves as social commentary on power structures. In interviews, Link describes her magical system as functioning like money and power—unevenly distributed among individuals, with some possessing greater access than others. Her design creates a self-perpetuating system where those granted magical abilities can generate additional power, though she notes that such access fundamentally alters individuals the way unlimited wealth and power transform people. Link intentionally maintains ambiguity in her fantastical elements, expressing resistance to overly explicit real-world parallels while recognizing that readers will inevitably draw their own connections between magical concepts and contemporary social realities.

== Genre ==
Gabino Iglesias for NPR, wrote that The Book of Love succeeds in "obliterating any perceived dividing line between speculative fiction and literary fiction", and that though the book is written for adult audiences, it contains numerous elements that give it the feel of a young adult fantasy novel. Gary K. Wolfe for Locus pointed out that the novel incorporates traditional elements of ghost stories, romance novels, coming-of-age tales, horror, and epic fantasy. Constance Grady, writing for Vox, characterized the novel as "a love story...ghost story, coming-of-age narrative, and portrait of a small-town."

== Narrative structure ==
The novel's chapter titles contribute to its epic scope, with sections titled as books of scripture such as "The Book of Daniel," "The Book of Laura," and "The Book of Mo". The narrative frequently circles back on itself, with chapters depicting the same events from different characters' perspectives separated by hours.

The pacing follows a deliberate two-part structure that Wolfe describes as leisurely in its opening half, focusing on character development and world-building before accelerating dramatically in the latter portion. While the story incorporates approximately twenty different viewpoints from various Lovesend residents, the central narrative remains anchored by four primary protagonists Mo, Laura, David and Susannah. Link intentionally employed this multi-perspective approach to achieve what she describes as a choral effect, incorporating diverse voices and rhythms reminiscent of musical composition, which contributes significantly to the novel's substantial length.

== Writing style ==
Link's narrative approach incorporates what critic Kevin Brockmeier identifies as three distinct modes of storytelling logic: daytime, nighttime, and dream logic. This conceptual framework, which Link endorses, originated in workshops with Howard Waldrop and Karen Joy Fowler as a method for discussing stories where fantastical elements operate through mechanisms that remain deliberately ambiguous.

Brockmeier describes daytime logic as producing rational, cause-and-effect understanding, while nighttime logic generates more mysterious, emotionally-driven comprehension, and dream logic creates emotional resonance without clear meaning. Morgan further clarifies this distinction, describing daytime logic as providing explanations for events, including supernatural occurrences, while nighttime logic operates more like carnival or Lynch-esque logic—maintaining an underlying organizational principle that creates coherence despite remaining unexplained and potentially unsettling.

In her interview with Brockmeier, Link explains that all writers benefit from considering how extraordinary circumstances or traumatic experiences fundamentally alter human perception and understanding of reality. She notes that even narratives leaning heavily toward nighttime logic require structural elements of daytime logic to guide readers through the story, and that excessive strangeness must be modulated when it fails to serve specific narrative purposes.

== Setting ==
The Book of Love takes place in December 2014, with Link demonstrating careful attention to the cultural moment through specific period details. Shaw observes that Link effectively captures the zeitgeist of the era through her characters' engagement with contemporary popular culture, including karaoke performances of recent hit songs, references to popular television and literary franchises, and time spent in cafes creating fan fiction based on popular animated series. According to Shaw, this meticulous attention to period-specific details serves to ground the fantastical elements of the story while adding authentic texture to the teenage characters' lives, creating a counterbalance to the novel's more portentous supernatural themes.

== Development history ==
Link's approach to crafting The Book of Love began with her characteristic method of establishing clear narrative direction and tone before considering how to engage with and subvert genre conventions. The novel's genesis traces back to her contract with Random House, where she committed to writing a novel alongside her short story collection Get in Trouble, using the contractual obligation as motivation to complete a longer work. Author Holly Black's advice influenced Link's commitment to intentional novel-writing, warning that she would eventually write one accidentally if she didn't approach it deliberately.

The writing process extended over eight years, during which the project evolved from an originally conceived trilogy—including a planned Regency romance pastiche—into a single comprehensive volume. Although the trilogy structure was abandoned, the novel retained its function as an homage to romantic fiction. The project served as Link's tribute to the romance genre, which she describes as providing her significant reading pleasure despite not working within it professionally herself.

Link's decision to adopt a maximalist approach, particularly in the novel's opening section, stemmed from thematic considerations about mortality and vitality. She explains that since the story centers on characters returning from death, she wanted to emphasize life's granular details—both irritating and delightful moments—as these small experiences sustain human existence and inform characters' decisions about their desire to remain alive.

Personal elements informed character development, particularly the sibling relationship between Susannah and Laura, which draws from Link's own teenage experiences with her sister, characterized by constant conflict and mutual incomprehension that eventually evolved into a strong adult relationship.

== Reception ==
The Book of Love received widespread critical attention and was included in several prestigious year-end lists, including Time Magazine's "100 Must-Reads of 2024" and The New York Times' "100 Notable Books of 2024."

Critics consistently praised Link's characterization abilities and artful prose, with Shaw identifying characterization as the novel's primary strength and Wolfe commending Link's distinctive sharpness and humor, describing her prose as capable of being both amusing and deeply affecting. Pritchett observed that the characters possess vivid qualities and that interpersonal relationships—whether familial, romantic, or sexual—drive much of both the plot and character development. Other critics viewed this aspect of the novel more critically: Grady noted that Link appears more invested in creating atmosphere and developing characters than in resolving plot mechanics.

Reviewers particularly celebrated the chapter focusing on Mo's grandmother Maryanne, with Charles describing it as a masterful demonstration of Link's abilities in shorter forms, and Grady calling it a brief but beautiful story that exemplifies Link's expertise.

Morgan praised the immersive small-town environment Link creates, highlighting the nuanced character relationships, blend of local history with cosmic mythology, and subtly integrated magical elements that create what he terms an exceptional comfort read.

=== Structural criticisms ===
Multiple critics identified significant pacing issues throughout the novel. Charles noted that excessive narrative energy becomes dissipated through repetitive conversations among the protagonists as they attempt to understand their situation, with crucial revelations arriving too late and creating confusion. Pulley attributed pacing problems to the characters' apparent disinterest in investigating their own deaths, while Grady characterized the work as slow-moving with answers to central mysteries withheld until very late in the narrative.

However, Charles acknowledged that despite these issues, the final hundred pages restored his engagement with the story as excitement builds. Grady offered a nuanced view, suggesting that while the deliberate pacing sometimes effectively explores the richly detailed setting and relationships, at other times it feels unnecessarily sluggish with information withheld arbitrarily.

=== Comparative analysis and tonal elements ===
Pulley observed that unlike most fantasy novels that present magic as extraordinary, Link's magical elements remain deliberately mundane.

Critics noted complex tonal dynamics within the narrative. Brady identified the novel's particular appeal in the contrast between the grandiose proclamations of supernatural characters and the ironic detachment of teenage protagonists who must balance cosmic threats with ordinary adolescent concerns like band politics and romantic relationships. However, this tonal mixing received mixed responses, with Brady noting that the Lovecraftian horror elements presented in a tongue-in-cheek style sometimes create effective tension but can also diminish what should be profound moments, and that the protagonists' casual treatment of their supernatural tormentors occasionally deflates dramatic tension.

Charles found the supernatural plot overly complex and somewhat absurd when contrasted with the genuine grief experienced by the resurrected students. Brady described the work as sprawling and occasionally majestic, featuring detailed world-building and appealing characters, though burdened by laborious plot development that challenges reader patience.

== Accolades ==
- Time Magazine's 100 Must-Reads of 2024
- The New York Times' 100 Notable Books of 2024
- Winner of the 2024 Los Angeles Times Book Prize in Science Fiction, Fantasy, and Speculative Fiction
