= Pastoralia =

Collection by George Saunders published in 2000

- US release cover
- Author: George Saunders
- Cover artist: Rodrigo Corral
- Language: English
- Publisher: Riverhead Books
- Publication date: June 2000
- Publication place: United States
- Media type: Print (hardcover)
- Pages: 208 p.
- ISBN: 1-57322-872-9

Pastoralia is short story writer George Saunders’s second full-length short story collection, published in 2000. The collection received highly positive reviews from book critics and was ranked the fifth-greatest book of the 2000s by literary magazine The Millions. The book consists of stories that appeared (sometimes in different forms) in The New Yorker; most of the stories were O. Henry Prize Stories. The collection was a New York Times Notable Book for 2001.

== Contents ==
- "Pastoralia"
- "Winky"
- "Sea Oak"
- The End of FIRPO in the World"
- "The Barber's Unhappiness"
- "The Falls"

== Reception ==
Chris Lehmann of Salon praised the book's relevance, calling Saunders a "master of distilling the disorders of our time into fiction." Lynne Tillman of The New York Times argued the stories "cover larger, more exciting territory" than Saunders' previous works, "with an abundance of ideas, meanings and psychological nuance." Pastoralia is also well-known for its writing style, which has been described as deadpan, realist, and/or postmodern. Iranian-American novelist and essayist Porochista Khakpour cited the "seamless coexistence of high and low" in the book's prose. A writer for Nylon argued the book's deadpan delivery and "satiric vision of contemporary America [secures Saunders'] place" as a successor to 20th century literary realists such as Thomas Pynchon and Kurt Vonnegut.

In 2007, Entertainment Weekly ranked the book #63 on its list of the top 100 works of literature since 1983. The following year, Emily VanDerWerff of The A.V. Club ranked it one of the ten best short story collections of the 2000s.
