= Los Angeles Times Book Prize in Science Fiction, Fantasy, and Speculative Fiction =

American literary award

The Los Angeles Times Book Prize in Science Fiction, Fantasy, and Speculative Fiction is an award presented each year to outstanding works of science fiction, fantasy, and speculative fiction. Established in 2019, the award is a category of the Los Angeles Times Book Prize and was originally named the "Ray Bradbury Prize" in honor of American speculative fiction writer Ray Bradbury (1920–2012).. However, in 2024 the Ray Bradbury Foundation stopped sponsoring the award after a change of ownership in Bradbury's estate.

== Recipients ==
Prize winners and finalists
Year	Author	Title	Publisher	Result	Ref.
2019	Marlon James	Black Leopard, Red Wolf	Riverhead Books	Winner	
2019	Ted Chiang	Exhalation: Stories	Alfred A. Knopf	Finalist	
2019	Amal El-Mohtar and Max Gladstone	This is How You Lose the Time War	Saga Press	Finalist	
2019	Brian Evenson	Song for the Unraveling of the World	Coffee House	Finalist	
2019	Namwali Serpell	The Old Drift	Hogarth Press	Finalist	
2020	Stephen Graham Jones	The Only Good Indians	Saga Press	Winner	
2020	Susanna Clarke	Piranesi	Bloomsbury Publishing	Finalist	
2020	Megan Giddings	Lakewood	Amistad Press	Finalist	
2020	N. K. Jemisin	The City We Became	Orbit Books	Finalist	
2020	Aoko Matsuda, trans. by Polly Barton	Where the Wild Ladies Are	Soft Skull	Finalist	
2021	Zen Cho	Spirits Abroad: Stories	Small Beer Press	Winner	
2021	Ryka Aoki	Light From Uncommon Stars	Tor Books	Finalist	
2021	Mariana Enríquez, trans. by Megan McDowell	The Dangers of Smoking in Bed	Hogarth Press	Finalist	
2021	Marissa Levien	The World Gives Way	Redhook Books	Finalist	
2021	Rivers Solomon	Sorrowland	MCD	Finalist	
2022	Nicola Griffith	Spear	Tor Books	Winner	
2022	Sara Gran	The Book of the Most Precious Substance	Dreamland Books	Finalist	
2022	Alex Jennings	The Ballad of Perilous Graves	Redhook Books	Finalist	
2022	Ray Nayler	The Mountain in the Sea	MCD	Finalist	
2022	George Saunders	Liberation Day: Stories	Random House	Finalist	
2023	Tananarive Due	The Reformatory	Saga Press	Winner	
2023	Daniel Kraus	Whalefall	Simon & Schuster	Finalist	
2023	Victor LaValle	Lone Women	One World	Finalist	
2023	V. E. Schwab	The Fragile Threads of Power	Tor Books	Finalist	
2023	E. Lily Yu	Jewel Box: Stories	Erewhon	Finalist	
2024	Kelly Link	The Book of Love	Random House	Winner	
2024	Jedediah Berry	The Naming Song	Tor Books	Finalist	
2024	Lev Grossman	The Bright Sword	Viking Books	Finalist	
2024	Jeff VanderMeer	Absolution	MCD	Finalist	
2024	Nghi Vo	The City in Glass	Tordotcom Publishing	Finalist	
2025	Silvia Park	Luminous	Simon & Schuster	Winner	
2025	Stephen Graham Jones	The Buffalo Hunter Hunter	Saga Press	Finalist	
2025	Jordan Kurella	The Death of Mountains	Lethe Press	Finalist	
2025	Nnedi Okorafor	Death of the Author	William Morrow	Finalist	
2025	Adam Oyebanji	Esperance	DAW Books	Finalist	
