= The Faery Handbag =

- Short story by Kelly Link
- Language: English
- Genre: Fantasy

Publication
- Published in: The Faery Reel: Tales from the Twilight Realm; ISBN 9780670059140 ed. Ellen Datlow ed. Terri Windling
- Publication type: Book, Anthology
- Publication date: 2004

"The Faery Handbag" is a fantasy novelette by American writer Kelly Link, first published in 2004 in The Faery Reel: Tales from the Twilight Realm and again in Link's 2005 short story collection, Magic for Beginners.

== Plot summary ==
The story follows Genevieve, a girl who spends a lot of time with her slightly eccentric grandmother Zofia. Zofia claims to be from the country Baldeziwurlekistan and also to be the guardian of a community of fairies who now live in her black handbag. She often tells outlandish tales about the beings in her handbag and blames them for her overdue library books. Things take a turn for the worse when Genevieve's boyfriend, Jake, snatches Zofia's handbag with the intent of finding out if the stories about it are true.

== Reception ==
"The Faery Handbag" was the winner of the 2005 Hugo Award for Best Novelette, the 2005 Nebula Award for Best Novelette, and the 2005 Locus Award for Best Novelette. It was also nominated for the 2005 World Fantasy Award for Short Story.
