= Get in Trouble =

2016 short story collection by Kelly Link

- Author: Kelly Link
- Language: English
- Genre: Fantasy, magical realism, horror
- Published: Random House
- Publication date: February 9, 2016
- Publication place: United States
- ISBN: 978-0-8129-8649-5
- Website: https://www.penguinrandomhouse.com/books/239601/get-in-trouble-by-kelly-link/

Get in Trouble is a collection of short stories by author Kelly Link. It contains nine short stories, five of which were previously published. The stories contain elements of fantasy, magical realism, and light horror.

The book was a finalist for the 2016 Pulitzer Prize in Fiction. It was also a finalist for the Indies Choice Book Award in the category "Book of the Year - Adult Fiction."

== Contents ==
=== "The Summer People" ===
When her dad leaves her alone for a few weeks, Fran introduces her childhood friend Ophelia to the "summer people," mysterious neighbors whom she is tasked to care for.

=== "I Can See Right Through You" ===
Years after starring together in an iconic vampire movie, Will joins ex-lover Meggie's ghost-hunting show as they investigate a vanished nudist colony.

=== "Secret Identity" ===
15-year-old Billie Faggart arrives at a hotel to meet Paul Zell, an older man she met online while concealing her identity. While waiting for him to arrive, she meets the attendees of the double-booked superhero and dentist conventions.

=== "Valley of the Girls" ===
In order to maintain discretion, wealthy families have assigned actors to take their children's public places during their adolescence. When the narrator falls in love with the actress playing his sister, dire consequences follow.

=== "Origin Story" ===
Superheroes Biscuit and Bunnatine discuss their shared past in an abandoned Wizard of Oz-themed amusement park. As more of their relationship is revealed, Bunnatine struggles to tell Biscuit the last secret she has kept.

=== "The Lesson" ===
Thanh and Harper are attending a surreal out-of-state wedding when their surrogate goes into premature labor.

=== "The New Boyfriend" ===
Jealous high school student Immy begins a relationship with her best friend's limited-edition Ghost Boyfriend.

=== "Two Houses" ===
Six deep space astronauts wake up to celebrate a birthday party. During the celebration, they find themselves telling ghost stories and remembering their sister ship, which vanished in front of them years before.

=== "Light" ===
Two years after her husband leaves her for a pocket universe, Lindsey is living with her twin brother, who she grew from her own shadow as a child.

== Development ==
In regards to the title, Link stated in an interview with Wired that the characters "were all people with poor impulse control" that were usually around trouble, so she felt the title best fit the situations the characters are around.

In an interview with The Masters Review, Link explained that when writing she often thinks about the conventions of storytelling, which allows her to mix so many different genres within her stories. For her writing, there is no "real" or unreal" elements when developing stories. Link has also stated that her stories are not written to fit specific themes and that many of her stories were written for different editors for previous publications. For this book, there was no specific time frame for her to complete her stories, and states that "The New Boyfriend" and "The Summer People" both took about a week to write, whereas "I Can See Right Through You" took longer than a year.

== Reception ==
From The New York Times, author Scarlett Thomas wrote that "Link's stories are never fully realist, but they are always beautifully written" and commends her ability to get readers to reflect and focus on "the small stuff of life." In a starred review, Kirkus Reviews compared it to the Grimm Brothers and stated, "Exquisite, cruelly wise and the opposite of reassuring, these stories linger like dreams..." Publishers Weekly (starred review) wrote "Link's characters, driven by yearning and obsession, not only get in trouble but seek trouble out—to spectacular effect."

The Daily Star, naming the collection's "The Summer People" as "Short Story of the Month", hailed Link's writing as "ageless" and "boundless", and for serving as a reminder of "how special and peculiar modern literature can be."

=== Accolades ===
The book was a finalist for two awards in 2016: the Pulitzer Prize for Fiction and the Indies Choice Book Award in the "Book of the Year - Adult Fiction" category.

The opening story, "The Summer People", previously won the 2011 Shirley Jackson Award for Best Novelette.
