= Liberation Day: Stories =

Collection by George Saunders published in 2022

- First edition cover
- Author: George Saunders
- Language: English
- Genre: Short story collection
- Publisher: Random House
- Publication date: October 18, 2022
- Publication place: United States
- Media type: Print (hardcover)
- Pages: 256 p.
- ISBN: 978-0-525-50959-2
- OCLC: 1346252900

Liberation Day: Stories is a book of short stories by the American writer George Saunders. It collects stories published between 2013 and 2022, along with a few new stories. The book was published October 18, 2022 by Random House.

== Contents ==
Story	Originally published in	Year
"Liberation Day"		
"The Mom of Bold Action"	The New Yorker	2021
"Love Letter"	The New Yorker	2020
"A Thing at Work"		
"Sparrow"		
"Ghoul"	The New Yorker	2020
"Mother's Day"	The New Yorker	2016
"Elliott Spencer"	The New Yorker	2019
"My House"		

== Reception ==
Kirkus Reviews described it as: "A tour de force collection that showcases all of Saunders' many skills." Colin Barrett, writing for The New York Times, described the collection as "a spiky, at times difficult collection, seldom providing the reader with much in the way of catharsis."

Former U.S. President Barack Obama listed it as one of his favorite books of 2022.

Liberation Day: Stories was a finalist for the 2022 Ray Bradbury Prize.
