= Silvia Park =

Korean-American writer

- 박지선
- Born: c. 1990; Indiana, USA
- Education: Columbia University (BA); New York University (MFA)
- Occupation: Author
- Writing career
- Language: English
- Notable work: Luminous (2025)
- Notable awards: 2025 Otherwise Award; 2025 Los Angeles Times Book Prize
- Website: silviapark.com

Silvia Park (Korean: 박지선; lit. 'Park Ji-seon'; born c. 1990) is a Korean-American writer. Her debut novel, Luminous (2025), won the Otherwise Award and the Los Angeles Times Book Prize in Science Fiction, Fantasy, and Speculative Fiction.

== Early life and education ==
Silvia Park was born in Indiana but her family relocated to South Korea, where she spent the majority of her childhood. She earned a BA from Columbia University and an MFA from New York University. She attended the Clarion Science Fiction and Fantasy Writers’ Workshop at the University of California, San Diego in 2018.

== Career ==
=== Teaching ===
Park is a professor in the English department at the University of Kansas. She has previously taught at Oberlin College, University of Utah’s Asia Campus, and NYU.

=== Literary career ===
Park's short stories have been published in Black Warrior Review, Tor.com, Joyland, Sonora Review, and elsewhere.

Her novelette "Poor Unfortunate Fools" was published in 2018 in The Margins, a magazine published by the Asian American Writers' Workshop. It was anthologized in The Best American Science Fiction and Fantasy 2019. The story is about the efforts to save a species of mermaids and mermen. It was inspired by the real life attempt to save the life of a beached vaquita.

Her debut novel, Luminous, was published by Simon & Schuster in 2025. Park officially started writing the book in 2018, but did most of the writing during the COVID-19 pandemic. The novel received glowing reviews, including starred reviews from Library Journal and Kirkus Reviews. It was nominated for and received multiple awards.

== Personal life ==
Park uses "she/they" pronouns.

== Awards ==
Awards and honors
Year	Work	Award	Category	Result	Ref.
2018	"shift+delete"	Sonora Review Fiction Prize	—	Won	
2025	Luminous	BSFA Award	Novel	Longlisted	
2025	Luminous	Los Angeles Times Book Prize	Science Fiction, Fantasy, and Speculative Fiction	Won	
2025	Luminous	Otherwise Award	—	Won	
2026	Luminous	Arthur C. Clarke Award	—	Shortlisted	
2026	Luminous	Dublin Literary Award	—	Nominated (Note: The first round of recognized titles are called "nominees". Six of those nominees, not including this work, were later shortlisted. One was chosen as the eventual winner.)	
2026	Luminous	Locus Award	First Novel	Finalist	

== Bibliography ==
=== Long fiction ===
- — (11 Mar 2025). Luminous. Simon & Schuster. ISBN 9781668021668.

=== Short fiction ===
- — (2018). "shift+delete". Sonora Review. No. 74: The Future.
- — (1 Nov 2018). "Poor Unfortunate Fools". The Margins. Asian American Writers' Workshop.
  - Reprinted: — (1 Oct 2019). "Poor Unfortunate Fools". In Machado, Carmen Maria (ed.). The Best American Science Fiction And Fantasy 2019. John Joseph Adams, series editor. Mariner Books. ISBN 9781328604378.
- — (15 April 2019). "Changeling". Joyland.
- — (7 August 2019). "More Real Than Him". Reactor.
