= The Brief and Frightening Reign of Phil =

2005 novella by George Saunders

- US release cover
- Author: George Saunders
- Illustrator: Ben Gibson
- Cover artist: Ben Gibson
- Language: English
- Genre: Political, Satire
- Published: 2005: Riverhead Books
- Publication date: September 6, 2005
- Publication place: United States
- Media type: Print (Paperback)
- Pages: 130 p.
- ISBN: 1-59448-152-0
- OCLC: 58920059
- Dewey Decimal: 813/.54 22
- LC Class: PS3569.A7897 B75 2005

The Brief and Frightening Reign of Phil is a 130-page novella by the American writer George Saunders. It has been described as a parable and likened to George Orwell's Animal Farm. Its author has said it is about "the human tendency to continuously divide the world into dualities". Saunders wrote the book over several years at Syracuse University, New York, where he is a creative writing professor.

== Plot ==
The story focuses on the border disputes between the countries of Inner and Outer Horner, the former of which is "so small that only one Inner Hornerite at a time could fit inside, and the other six Inner Hornerites had to wait their turns to live in their own country while standing very timidly in the surrounding country of outer Horner."

Phil, an embittered Outer Hornerite, decides that the puny Inner Hornerites do nothing but stand around very close together solving math proofs all day and have to stretch one at a time every morning. Seen as an evil threat to the leisure of the five Outer Hornerites, they are understood as abusing the vast goodwill they have received courtesy of the Outer Hornerites. Standing in the short-term residency zone in Outer Horner, they wait their turn to reenter their country. So Phil, gaining the support of the other Outer Hornerites and hiring two giants as his personal policy enforcers, begins to tax the Inner Hornerites for staying in his country. He settles in the end to accept the disassembling of the Inner Hornerites as sufficient payment. The story chronicles Phil's tyrannical rise to power and his attempted Inner Hornerite genocide.

== History ==
The story grew out of a challenge from the illustrator Lane Smith, who suggested Saunders "write a story in which all the characters were abstract shapes". Saunders wrote "Once there was a country that was too small for all its inhabitants to fit inside at once" and the story developed from that point. The abstract shapes became what Saunders regarded as "Conglomerates, composed of flesh and machine parts and vegetative portions" divided into two groups, one led by Phil, tried to eradicate the other. In his essay "Why I wrote Phil", Saunders said the story became about "the human tendency to continuously divide the world into dualities, and, soon after, cast one's lot in with one side of the duality and begin energetically trying to eliminate the other". Saunders initially wanted it to be a children's book before it "became about genocide". He worked on the story for about six years, from 1999 to 2005, "on and off" as a side project, with the book reaching about 300 pages at one point. Saunders reduced the length of the story by removing several scenes which he said "had to go, because they, in the context of the book, slowed things down, made a story that I hoped would feel catastrophic and a little scary, feel leisurely."
