= The Braindead Megaphone =

2007 essay collection by George Saunders

- US release cover
- Author: George Saunders
- Language: English
- Publisher: Riverhead Books
- Publication date: September 4, 2007
- Publication place: United States
- Media type: Print (Trade Paperback)
- Pages: 272 p.
- ISBN: 1-59448-256-X

The Braindead Megaphone is George Saunders’s first full-length essay collection, published in 2007; it is 272 pages long. The collection has many essays that appeared in The New Yorker and GQ.

== Contents ==
- "The Braindead Megaphone"
- "The New Mecca" (originally published in GQ)
- "Thank You, Esther Forbes"
- "A Survey of the Literature" (originally published in The New Yorker, 2003)
- "Mr. Vonnegut in Sumatra"
- "A Brief Study of the British"
- "Nostalgia" (originally published in The New Yorker, 2006)
- "Ask the Optimist!" (originally published in The New Yorker, 2006)
- "Proclamation," (originally published in The New Yorker, 2006)
- "Woof: A Plea of Sorts"
- "The Great Divider"
- "Thought Experiment" (originally published as "Advice from an Old Fart, in the Form of a Thought Experiment" in Take My Advice, edited by James L. Harmon, 2002)
- "The Perfect Gerbil: Reading Barthelme's 'The School'"
- "The United States of Huck: Introduction to Adventures of Huckleberry Finn (introduction to The Adventures of Huckleberry Finn, 2001.)
- "Buddha Boy" (originally published as "The Incredible Buddha Boy," GQ, 2007).
- "Manifesto: A Press Release from PRKA" (originally published on Slate.com, 2004).
