= Tenth of December: Stories =

2013 short story collection by George Saunders

Tenth of December
- US release cover
- Author: George Saunders
- Language: English
- Genre: Short story collection
- Publisher: Random House
- Publication date: January 8, 2013
- Publication place: United States
- Media type: Print (hardcover)
- Pages: 208
- ISBN: 0812993802
- OCLC: 785558855

Tenth of December is a collection of short stories by American author George Saunders. It contains stories published in various magazines between 1995 and 2012. The book was published on January 8, 2013, by Random House. One of the stories, "Home", was a 2011 Bram Stoker Award finalist. Tenth of December was selected as one of the 10 Best Books of 2013 by the editors of The New York Times Book Review. The collection also won The Story Prize (2013) for short-story collections and the inaugural Folio Prize (2014).

== Contents ==
Story	Originally published in	Year
"Victory Lap"	The New Yorker	2009
"Sticks"	Harper's Magazine	1995
"Puppy"	The New Yorker	2007
"Escape from Spiderhead"	The New Yorker	2010
"Exhortation" -- Originally published as part of "Four Institutional Monologues"	McSweeney's	2000
"Al Roosten"	The New Yorker	2009
"The Semplica Girl Diaries"	The New Yorker	2012
"Home"	The New Yorker	2011
"My Chivalric Fiasco"	Harper's	2011
"Tenth of December"	The New Yorker	2011

== Plot ==
=== "Victory Lap" ===
A young girl named Alison is kidnapped three days before her birthday. Kyle, a boy who lives nearby whose parents enforce very strict household rules, sees the event unfold and must decide whether to help Alison (who used to be his friend but stopped hanging out with him after becoming popular) or to ignore the situation to keep himself safe.

=== "Sticks" ===
A father has a tall pole in the front yard that he constantly decorates for holidays. His child recounts life with his dad and how the man eventually lost his sanity after his wife died and began to decorate the pole in bizarre ways.

=== "Puppy" ===
Two women, Callie and Marie, lead very different lives. Callie has a happy life with her husband, whom she loves. She has a son, Bo, who runs away and darts in between cars on the interstate. In order to keep him safe, she chains him to a tree like a dog in the backyard. She sees this as a way to keep him from escaping, because he loves it outside and hates it in the house. They have a very messy home and constantly adopt pets to sell. When they are not sold, her husband kills them, justifying it by explaining that he grew up on a farm, and animals dying was a constant part of life. Callie wants nothing more than to please him, so she accepts this behavior. Marie has a different life. She also has a son with behavioral problems, which she solves by keeping him glued to a handheld video game. Marie had a troubled childhood and was neglected by her mother. The two women meet when Marie arrives at Callie's house to buy a new puppy for her children. Marie's children beg her to adopt it, but after seeing Bo out the window chained to a tree, Marie decides against it and leaves abruptly. In order to protect her husband from having to kill the puppy, Callie later abandons it in a nearby cornfield to die.

=== "Escape from Spiderhead" ===
Because he was convicted of killing a classmate, Jeff has been sent to an experimental prison where inhabitants are guinea pigs for a man named Ray Abnesti, a sort of warden who develops pharmaceuticals. In an experiment to determine the strength of love, Abnesti puts Jeff in a room with a woman named Heather. Neither finds the other very attractive until a drug is administered and they suddenly fall deeply in love with each other and have sex. This continues until the drug stops being administered, when they suddenly lose all love for each other. The process is repeated with Jeff and a woman named Rachel. The next day, Abnesti brings both Heather and Rachel into a room and asks Jeff to decide which woman should be drugged with Darkenfloxx, a drug that causes extreme mental and physical distress. Jeff wants no one to be hurt, but has no preference as to which should endure the drug. Satisfied, Abnesti decides not to administer the drug. Later, Jeff finds himself in a room with another man whom he realizes also had sex with Rachel and Heather. He realizes that Abnesti is asking one of the women which one of the men should be given Darkenfloxx. The same result happens each time, and the drug is never administered.

Later, after Abnesti presents the love drug he is developing to his superiors, he says he must go into greater depth and gives Heather Darkenfloxx, saying that Jeff must say exactly what he feels while he watches Heather suffer in order to prove he has no romantic feelings for her. But the Darkenfloxx is so damaging that Heather commits suicide to escape the pain. When Abnesti reveals that he will do the same thing to Rachel to determine whether Jeff has a romantic attachment, Jeff refuses to participate. He insists that the drug should not be used. Abnesti leaves to get a warrant to administer drugs to Jeff that will force him to comply. To prevent Rachel from being tortured, Jeff administers Darkenfloxx to himself, and while under its influence kills himself. A voice tells him that his body is salvageable, and he can return to life, but Jeff declines, knowing he's had enough of life. Jeff's final emotion is happiness that, in the end, he did not kill and never would again.

=== "Exhortation" ===
A letter from a man named Todd, the boss of a group of men who do mysterious work in Room 6, encourages his staff to have a positive attitude about their work, which is never named but must be guessed by the reader.

=== "Al Roosten" ===
Al, an unsuccessful antique store owner, is involved in a charity event in which he must dress up and walk down a runway in order to earn money. One of the competitors in the event is Larry Donfrey, a successful realtor for whom Al has very bitter and jealous feelings. He suppresses his hatred for Donfrey by making up elaborate schemes in his head in which the two become good friends and Al gains the respect he craves from the town.

=== "The Semplica Girl Diaries" ===
The narrator, a middle-class father, living a safe but unfulfilling life, attempts to please his daughter Lilly and compete with a wealthier family by buying her various lavish gifts. These include Semplica Girls, women trafficked from third-world countries to be used as human lawn ornaments. His sensitive younger daughter Eva frees the Semplica Girls, a felony. The loss of the Semplica Girls puts the family in severe debt. In confronting the legal and financial hardships he now faces, the narrator learns of the more severe challenges faced by the Semplica Girls in their home countries.

=== "Home" ===
A soldier named Mikey returns to live with his mother and has to learn to adapt to the new world.

=== "My Chivalric Fiasco" ===
Ted, a janitor, witnesses the rape of fellow employee Martha by Don Murray, the boss of the Medieval theme park where Ted works. Because both Martha and Don want to avoid embarrassment, Ted is given "hush money" in the form of a promotion: he is now a pacing guard. For his new job, he must take KnightLyfeⓇ, a drug that cause him to think, act, and speak like a chivalric knight. Because of his chivalry, he eventually reveals to others what happened to Martha. When Don learns of this, Ted is fired.

=== "Tenth of December" ===
A lonely boy with heroic daydreams and a cancer patient seeking to die by suicide take a walk in the same woods.

== Development ==
Saunders has commented that he was inspired to write the title story, "Tenth of December," after beginning to wonder how he would handle "a slow and protracted death." That later led to the idea of a man planning to freeze to death, only to be interrupted during his efforts.

== Reception ==
The collection debuted at #3 on The New York Times Hardcover Fiction Bestselling List. During the week of February 24, 2013, it reached #2 on that same list.

Critical reception for the book has been highly positive, with the Philadelphia City Paper stating that although the stories didn't have a sense of cohesiveness, "the stories seemed tied together at the brain, like the poor unfortunates in one of the best stories in December."

The List praised some of the stories in the book, but wrote that the "overall effect is rather insubstantial". Kirkus Reviews and Booklist both gave the compilation a starred review, with Booklist writing that the set had "unpredictable, stealthily funny, and complexly affecting stories of ludicrousness, fear, and rescue". Entertainment Weekly gave the collection an A, saying that Saunders "is the master of joy bombs: little explosions of grin-stimulating genius that he buries throughout his deeply thoughtful, endlessly entertaining flights of imagination" and "offers an irresistible mix of humor and humanity."

Reviewing the book for New York Journal of Books, Charles Holdefer wrote that it "shows the writer in excellent form and will surely rank as one of his best books to date. The opening story, "Victory Lap," is one of the strongest the author has ever written. Hilarious and alarming, it's a tale of children in extreme danger that manages to avoid the noxious clichés often accompanying the genre. It's also a technical marvel, compressing three distinct points of view and individual backstories into a very small space. The bold shifts of consciousness here positively sizzle."

In a January 2013 cover story about the author, The New York Times Magazine called Tenth of December "The best book you'll read this year." In 2019, The Guardian ranked it the 22nd best book since 2000. In 2024, the New York Times ranked it #54th in its list of the 100 best books of the 21st century.

== Translations ==
Tenth of December: Stories has been translated into Spanish by translator Ben Clark and published by Ediciones Alfabia in 2013.

Tenth of December / George Saunders has been translated into Persian by Marziyeh Khosravi. (Tehran: Cheshmeh Publishing, 2015) ISBN 9786002296269.

The short story collection has been translated into Polish by translator of modern English language literature Michał Kłobukowski and published by W.A.B. in 2016.

== Film adaptation ==
The story "Escape from Spiderhead" was adapted as the film Spiderhead, directed by Joseph Kosinski and starring Chris Hemsworth, Miles Teller and Jurnee Smollett. It was released on Netflix in June 2022.
