= Alyosha the Pot =

1911 short story written by Leo Tolstoy

Alyosha The Pot
- Author: Leo Tolstoy
- Language: Russian
- Genre: Literary Fiction/ Classic
- Published: 1911
- Publication place: Russia

"Alyosha the Pot" (Russian: Алёша Горшок [Alyosha Gorshok]) is a short story written by Leo Tolstoy in 1905 about the life and death of a simple, uncomplaining worker. It was published after Tolstoy's death in 1911 and received high praise from Tolstoy's contemporaries. D. S. Mirsky considered it "a masterpiece of rare perfection." Alyosha's simple life, soft-spoken manner, and calm acceptance of death epitomizes Tolstoyan principles.

== History ==
The hero and namesake of the story was based on a real person. According to the memoirs of Tatyana Andreevna Kuzminskaya (Lev Tolstoy's sister-in-law), "the assistant to the cook and yard-keeper was the half idiot Alyosha the Pot, who was, for some reason, romanticized to the point that reading about him, I could not recognize our yurodivy and ugly Alyosha. But, as far as I remember, he was quiet, inoffensive, and meekly did all that was ordered of him."

== Synopsis ==
As a young child, Alyosha lived in a village and was nicknamed "the Pot" after he broke a milk pot. At 19, his father sends him to live with a merchant's family working as a yard-keeper (дворник). As the family begins to assign him nearly all of the housework and errands, he does everything without complaint. Alyosha's father collected his salary, but Alyosha got to keep the occasional tip. Alyosha spoke very little, was not educated, and did not know formal prayers—instead, he "prayed with his hands", crossing himself. After a year and a half, Alyosha began to feel that the cook, Ustinia, took pity on him. "He felt for the first time in his life that he--not his services, but he himself--was necessary to another human being". Alyosha falls in love with Ustinia and eventually asks her to marry him, but the merchant dislikes the idea and Alyosha's father forbids the marriage. Alyosha agrees and ceases to discuss marriage with Ustinia. For the first and only time in the story, Alyosha breaks his lighthearted, laughing demeanor and cries.

Later during Lent, Alyosha falls while he clears snow from the roof. On the third day, he died quietly, having calmly accepted his impending death. "He lay in wonderment, then stretched himself, and died."
