= Magic for Beginners (novella) =

2005 fantasy novella by Kelly Link

"Magic for Beginners" is a fantasy novella by American writer Kelly Link. It was first published in The Magazine of Fantasy & Science Fiction in September 2005. It was subsequently published in Link's collection of the same name, as well as in her collection Pretty Monsters, in the 2007 Nebula Award Showcase, and in the John Joseph Adams-edited anthology Other Worlds Than These.

== Setting ==
Jeremy Mars is a young teenager who (like many of his friends) is a fan of — and also a character in — a mysterious television program called The Library. The story follows his life, and those of his friends and family, as various episodes of The Library are broadcast at irregular intervals.

== Reception ==
"Magic for Beginners" won the 2005 Nebula Award for Best Novella, the 2005 BSFA Award for Short Fiction, and the 2006 Locus Award for Best Novella, and was nominated for the 2006 Hugo Award for Best Novella, the 2006 World Fantasy Award—Novella, and the 2006 Theodore Sturgeon Award.

Nancy Pearl compared "Magic for Beginners" to M. C. Escher's Drawing Hands, saying that it is "intricate, wildly imaginative and totally wonderful". Cory Doctorow called it the "standout" story in Link's 2005 eponymous collection, describing it as "absurdist magic realism, like Douglas Coupland wandering through a Márquez novel". Niall Harrison described it as being about "how stories differ from real life" and "what it feels like to love stories."

At the SF Site, Rich Horton stated that "Magic for Beginners" was "one of [his] favorite stories of this decade", and "a delight", while at Subterranean Press Magazine, Dorman T. Shindler compared it to being mildly intoxicated.
