= George Saunders =

American writer (born 1958)

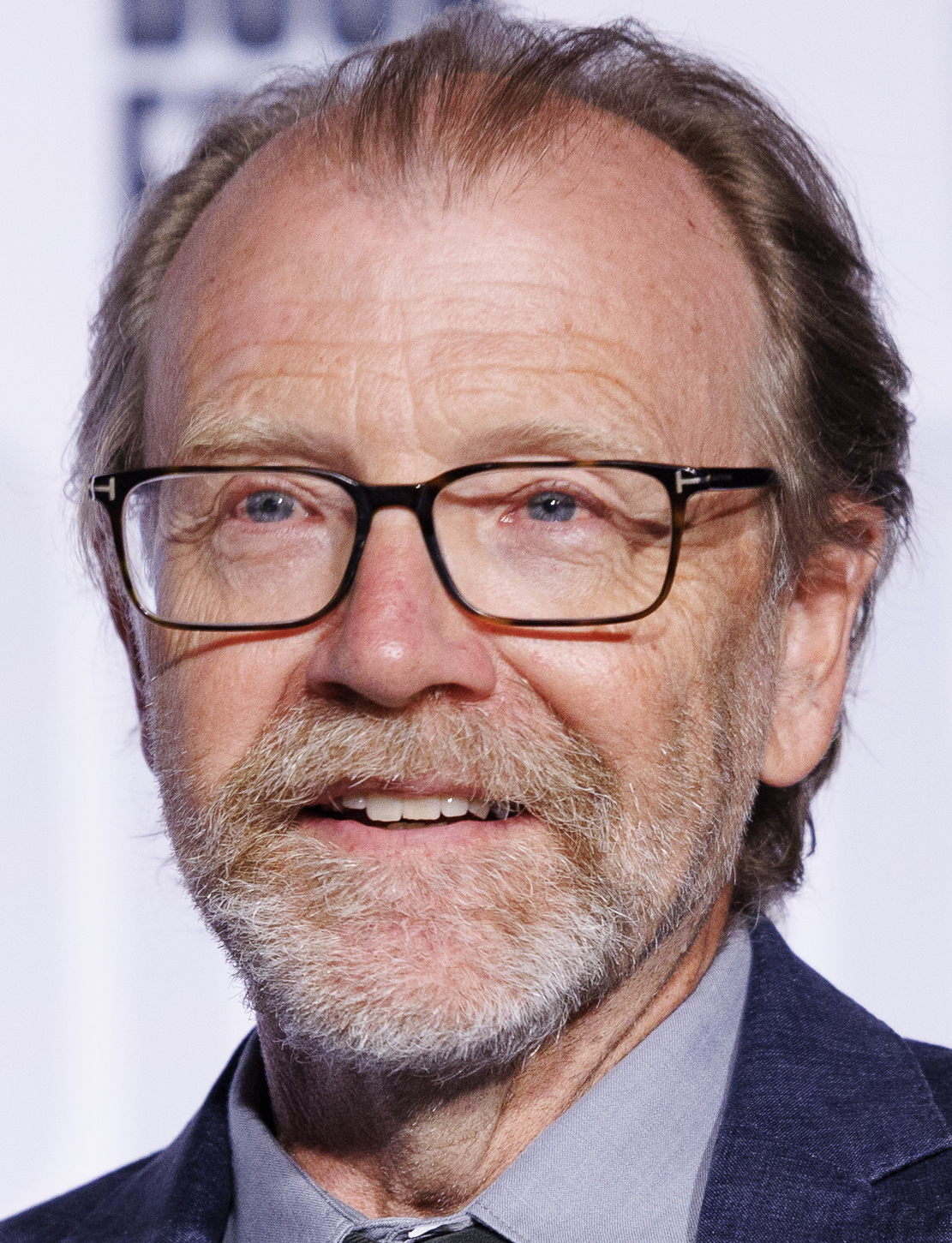
- Saunders in 2023
- Born: December 2, 1958 (age 67); Amarillo, Texas, U.S.
- Education: Colorado School of Mines (B.S.); Syracuse University (M.F.A.)
- Occupations: Writer; journalist; college professor
- Spouse: Paula Redick
- Children: 2
- Writing career
- Language: English
- Period: 1986–present (Note: In the "Author's Note" to the 2012 paperback reprint of CivilWarLand in Bad Decline, Saunders writes about an early story he published in 1986, titled "A Lack of Order in the Floating Object Room," which he "used ... to get into Syracuse. This story was originally published in Northwest Review, Volume 24, Number 2, in 1986.")
- Notable works: CivilWarLand in Bad Decline (1996); Pastoralia (2000); Tenth of December (2013); Lincoln in the Bardo (2017)
- Notable awards: MacArthur Fellowship 2006; PEN/Malamud Award 2013; Folio Prize 2014 Tenth of December: Stories; Booker Prize 2017 Lincoln in the Bardo
- Website: www.georgesaundersbooks.com

George Saunders (born December 2, 1958) is an American writer. He is best known for his short stories and his novel Lincoln in the Bardo (2017), which won the Booker Prize. Saunders's short stories have been published in several collections, including CivilWarLand in Bad Decline (1996) and Tenth of December: Stories (2013).

A professor at Syracuse University, Saunders won the National Magazine Award for fiction in 1994, 1996, 2000, and 2004, and second prize in the O. Henry Awards in 1997. His first story collection, CivilWarLand in Bad Decline, was a finalist for the 1996 PEN/Hemingway Award. In 2006, Saunders received a MacArthur Fellowship and won the World Fantasy Award for his short story "CommComm".

His story collection In Persuasion Nation was a finalist for The Story Prize in 2007. In 2013, he won the PEN/Malamud Award and was a finalist for the National Book Award. Tenth of December: Stories won The Story Prize for short-story collections and the inaugural (2014) Folio Prize.

== Early life and education ==
Saunders was born in Amarillo, Texas. He grew up in Oak Forest, Illinois, near Chicago, attended St. Damian Catholic School and graduated from Oak Forest High School in Oak Forest, Illinois. He spent some of his early twenties working as a roofer in Chicago, a doorman in Beverly Hills, and a slaughterhouse knuckle-puller. In 1981, he received a B.S. in geophysical engineering from Colorado School of Mines in Golden, Colorado. Of his scientific background, Saunders has said, "any claim I might make to originality in my fiction is really just the result of this odd background: basically, just me working inefficiently, with flawed tools, in a mode I don't have sufficient background to really understand. Like if you put a welder to designing dresses."

In 1988, he was awarded an M.A. in English from Syracuse University, where he worked with Tobias Wolff. At Syracuse, he met Paula Redick, a fellow writer, whom he married. Saunders recalled, "we [got] engaged in three weeks, a Syracuse Creative Writing Program record that, I believe, still stands".

Of his influences, Saunders has written:

I really love Russian writers, especially from the 19th and early 20th Century: Gogol, Tolstoy, Chekhov, Babel. I love the way they take on the big topics. I'm also inspired by a certain absurdist comic tradition that would include influences like Mark Twain, Daniil Kharms, Groucho Marx, Monty Python, Steve Martin, Jack Handey, etc. And then, on top of that, I love the strain of minimalist American fiction writing: Sherwood Anderson, Ernest Hemingway, Raymond Carver, Tobias Wolff.

== Career ==
From 1989 to 1996, Saunders worked as a technical writer and geophysical engineer for Radian International, an environmental engineering firm in Rochester, New York. He also worked for a time with an oil exploration crew in Sumatra in the early 1980s.

Since 1997, Saunders has been on the faculty of Syracuse University, teaching creative writing in the school's MFA program in addition to writing fiction and nonfiction. In 2006, he was awarded a Guggenheim Fellowship and a $500,000 MacArthur Fellowship. He was a Visiting Writer at Wesleyan University and Hope College in 2010 and participated in Wesleyan's Distinguished Writers Series and Hope College's Visiting Writers Series. His nonfiction collection, The Braindead Megaphone, was published in 2007.

Saunders's fiction often focuses on the absurdity of consumerism, corporate culture, and the role of mass media. While multiple reviewers have noted his writing's satirical tone, his work also raises moral and philosophical questions. The tragicomic element in his writing has earned Saunders comparisons to Kurt Vonnegut, whose work has inspired him.

Ben Stiller bought the film rights to CivilWarLand in Bad Decline in the late 1990s; as of 2007, the project was in development by Stiller's company, Red Hour Productions. Saunders has also written a feature-length screenplay based on his short story "Sea Oak".

From 2006 to 2008, Saunders wrote a weekly column, "American Psyche", for The Guardian's weekend magazine.

Saunders considered himself an Objectivist in his twenties but now views the philosophy unfavorably, likening it to neoconservatism. He is a student of Nyingma Buddhism.

== Awards and honors ==
=== Honors ===
In 2001, Saunders received a Lannan Literary Fellowship in Fiction from the Lannan Foundation.

In 2006, Saunders was awarded a Guggenheim Fellowship. Also that year, he received a MacArthur Fellowship.

In 2009, Saunders received an award from the American Academy of Arts and Letters. In 2013, Time magazine named Saunders one of its 100 most influential people. The author Mary Karr wrote for Time, "For more than a decade, George Saunders has been the best short-story writer in English". In 2014, he was elected to the American Academy of Arts and Sciences.

=== Awards ===
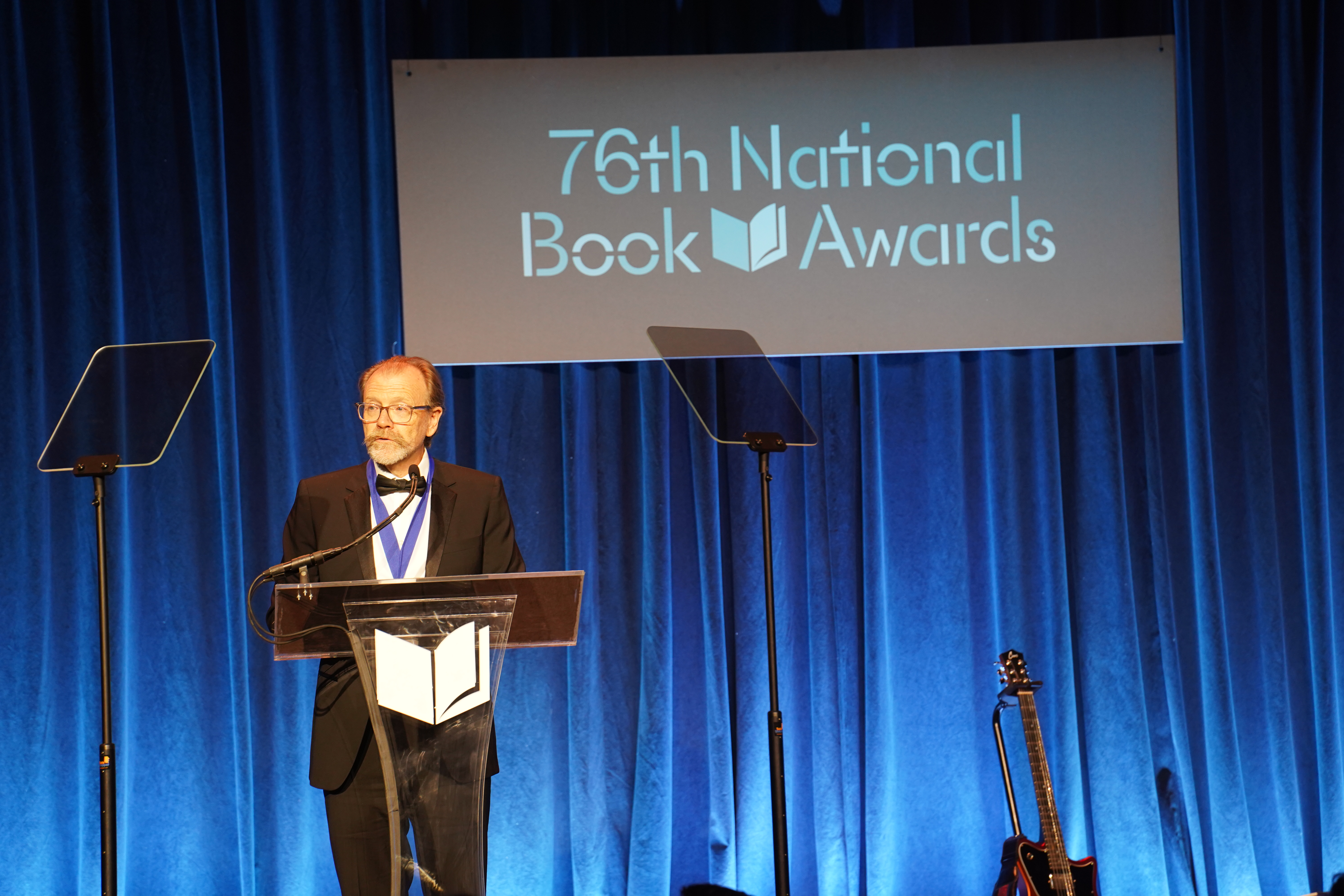
George Saunders receiving the National Book Foundation's 2025 Distinguished Contribution to American Letters (DCAL).

Saunders has won the National Magazine Award for Fiction four times: in 1994, for "The 400-Pound CEO" (published in Harper's); in 1996, for "Bounty" (also published in Harper's); in 2000, for "The Barber's Unhappiness" (published in The New Yorker); and in 2004, for "The Red Bow" (published in Esquire). Saunders won second prize in the 1997 O. Henry Awards for his short story "The Falls", initially published in the January 22, 1996, issue of The New Yorker.

In 2013, Saunders won the PEN/Malamud Award for Excellence in the Short Story. His short-story collection Tenth of December was named one of the "10 Best Books of 2013" by the editors of The New York Times Book Review. In a January 2013 cover story, The New York Times Magazine called Tenth of December "the best book you'll read this year". One of the stories in the collection, "Home", was a 2011 Bram Stoker Award finalist.

In 2017, Saunders published his first novel, Lincoln in the Bardo, which won the Booker Prize and was a New York Times bestseller.

On November 19, 2025, the National Book Foundation presented its 2025 Medal for Distinguished Contribution to American Letters (DCAL) to Saunders at the 76th National Book Awards Ceremony and Benefit Dinner.

Literary awards
| Year | Title | Award | Category | Result | Ref. |
|---|---|---|---|---|---|
| 1994 | "The 400-Pound CEO" | National Magazine Awards | Fiction | Won | |
| 1996 | "Bounty" | National Magazine Awards | Fiction | Won | |
| 1996 | CivilWarLand in Bad Decline | PEN/Hemingway Award | — | Finalist | |
| 1997 | "The Falls" | O. Henry Awards | — | 2nd prize | |
| 2000 | "The Barber's Unhappiness" | National Magazine Awards | Fiction | Won | |
| 2003 | "The Red Bow" | Bram Stoker Award | Short Fiction | Nominated | |
| 2004 | "The Red Bow" | National Magazine Awards | Fiction | Won | |
| 2006 | In Persuasion Nation | The Story Prize | — | Shortlisted | |
| 2006 | "CommComm" | World Fantasy Award | Short Story | Won | |
| 2011 | "Home" | Bram Stoker Award | Short Fiction | Nominated | |
| 2013 | Tenth of December: Stories | Goodreads Choice Award | Fiction | Nominated—10th | |
| 2013 | Tenth of December: Stories | The Story Prize | — | Won | |
| 2014 | Tenth of December: Stories | Folio Prize | — | Won | |
| 2014 | Tenth of December: Stories | National Book Award | Fiction | Finalist | |
| 2017 | Lincoln in the Bardo | Goodreads Choice Awards | Historical Fiction | Nominated | |
| 2017 | Lincoln in the Bardo | Man Booker Prize | — | Won | |
| 2017 | Lincoln in the Bardo | Waterstones Book of the Year | — | Shortlisted | |
| 2018 | Lincoln in the Bardo | Andrew Carnegie Medals for Excellence | Fiction | Shortlisted | |
| 2018 | Lincoln in the Bardo | Audie Awards | Audiobook of the Year | Won | |
| 2018 | Lincoln in the Bardo | Chicago Tribune Heartland Prize | Fiction | Won | |
| 2018 | Lincoln in the Bardo | Locus Award | First Novel | Finalist—4th | |
| 2018 | Lincoln in the Bardo | Premio Gregor von Rezzori | — | Won | |
| 2019 | Lincoln in the Bardo | International Dublin Literary Award | — | Shortlisted | |
| 2019 | Lincoln in the Bardo | Tähtivaeltaja Award | — | Nominated | |
| 2021 | A Swim in a Pond in the Rain | Goodreads Choice Awards | Non-Fiction | Nominated | |
| 2022 | Liberation Day: Stories | BookTube Prize | Fiction | Octofinalist | |
| 2022 | Liberation Day: Stories | Los Angeles Times Book Prize | Ray Bradbury Prize | Finalist | |
| 2023 | — | Library of Congress Prize for American Fiction | — | Won | |

=== Other honors ===
- Lannan Foundation – Lannan Literary Fellowship, 2001
- MacArthur Fellowship, 2006
- Guggenheim Fellowship, 2006
- American Academy of Arts and Letters, Academy Award, 2009
- PEN/Malamud Award for Excellence in the Short Story, 2013
- The New York Times Book Review's "10 Best Books of 2013", Tenth of December: Stories
- American Academy of Arts and Sciences, Elected as Member, 2014
- American Academy of Arts and Letters, Inducted as Member, 2018
- The House of Culture (Stockholm) International Literary Prize, 2018

== Selected works ==
=== Story collections ===
- CivilWarLand in Bad Decline (1996) (short stories and a novella)
- Pastoralia (2000) (short stories and a novella)
- In Persuasion Nation (2006) (short stories)
- Tenth of December: Stories (2013) (short stories)
- Fox 8 (2018, long story (first publ. as an e-book 2013))
- Liberation Day: Stories (2022) (short stories)

=== Novels ===
- The Brief and Frightening Reign of Phil (2005, novella)
- Lincoln in the Bardo (2017)
- Vigil (2026)

=== Nonfiction ===
- — (2007). The Braindead Megaphone.
- — (2021). A Swim in a Pond in the Rain: In Which Four Russians Give a Master Class on Writing, Reading, and Life.

=== Children's books ===
- The Very Persistent Gappers of Frip (2000)

=== Essays and reporting ===
- — (2006). A bee stung me, so I killed all the fish (notes from the Homeland 2003–2006). Riverhead Books.
- — (Autumn 2009). "The View from the South Side, 1970". Granta (108): 120–122.
- — (2014). "Congratulations, by the Way: Some Thoughts on Kindness".
- — (July 11–18, 2016). "Trump days: up close with the candidate and his crowds". American Chronicles. The New Yorker. Vol. 92, no. 21. pp. 50–61.

=== Anthologies ===
- Fakes: An Anthology of Pseudo-Interviews, Faux-Lectures, Quasi-Letters, "Found" Texts, and Other Fraudulent Artifacts, edited by David Shields and Matthew Vollmer (2012)
- Cappelens Forslags Conversational Lexicon Volume II, edited by Pil Cappelen Smith, published by Cappelens Forslag (2016) ISBN 978-82-999643-4-0

=== Interviews ===
- "Choose Your Own Adventure: A Conversation With Jennifer Egan and George Saunders". New York Times Magazine, November 2015.
- "A Conversation with George Saunders". Image Journal, 2016.
- "George Saunders: The Art of Fiction No. 245". The Paris Review, issue 231 (Winter 2019).
- "An Interview with George Saunders". Believer Magazine, January 2021.
- "George Saunders on A Swim in a Pond in the Rain." Mayday, March 2021.

=== Stories ===
| Title | Publication | Collected in |
|---|---|---|
| "A Lack of Order in the Floating Object Room" | Northwest Review 24.2 (Winter 1986) | - |
| "In the Park, Higher than the Town" | Puerto del Sol 22.2 (Spring 1987) | - |
| "Downtrodden Mary's Failed Campaign of Terror" | Quarterly West 34 (Winter-Spring 1992) | CivilWarLand in Bad Decline |
| "CivilWarLand in Bad Decline" | The Kenyon Review 14.4 (Autumn 1992) | CivilWarLand in Bad Decline |
| "Offloading for Mrs. Schwartz" | The New Yorker (October 5, 1992) | CivilWarLand in Bad Decline |
| "The 400-Pound CEO" | Harper's (February 1993) | CivilWarLand in Bad Decline |
| "The Wavemaker Falters" | Witness 7.2 (1993) | CivilWarLand in Bad Decline |
| "Sticks" | Story (Winter 1994) | Tenth of December |
| "Isabelle" | Indiana Review (April 1994) | CivilWarLand in Bad Decline |
| "Bounty" | Harper's (April 1995) | CivilWarLand in Bad Decline |
| "The Falls" | The New Yorker (January 22, 1996) | Pastoralia |
| "Winky" | The New Yorker (July 28, 1997) | Pastoralia |
| "The Deacon" | The New Yorker (December 22–29, 1997) | - |
| "The End of FIRPO in the World" | The New Yorker (May 18, 1998) | Pastoralia |
| "Sea Oak" | The New Yorker (December 28, 1998) | Pastoralia |
| "I Can Speak!"™ | The New Yorker (June 21–28, 1999) | In Persuasion Nation |
| "The Barber's Unhappiness" | The New Yorker (December 20, 1999) | Pastoralia |
| "Exhortation" aka "Four Institutional Monologues I" | McSweeney's 4 (Winter 2000) | Tenth of December |
| "93990" aka "Four Institutional Monologues IV" | McSweeney's 4 (Winter 2000) | In Persuasion Nation |
| "Pastoralia" | The New Yorker (April 3, 2000) | Pastoralia |
| "My Flamboyant Grandson" | The New Yorker (January 28, 2002) | In Persuasion Nation |
| "Jon" | The New Yorker (January 27, 2003) | In Persuasion Nation |
| "The Red Bow" | Esquire (September 2003) | In Persuasion Nation |
| "Christmas" aka "Chicago Christmas, 1984" | The New Yorker (December 22, 2003) | In Persuasion Nation |
| "Bohemians" | The New Yorker (January 19, 2004) | In Persuasion Nation |
| "My Amendment" | The New Yorker (March 8, 2004) | In Persuasion Nation |
| "Adams" | The New Yorker (August 9, 2004) | In Persuasion Nation |
| "Brad Carrigan, American" | Harper's (March 2005) | In Persuasion Nation |
| "CommComm" | The New Yorker (August 5, 2005) | In Persuasion Nation |
| "In Persuasion Nation" | Harper's (November 2005) | In Persuasion Nation |
| "Puppy" | The New Yorker (May 28, 2007) | Tenth of December |
| "Al Roosten" | The New Yorker (February 2, 2009) | Tenth of December |
| "Victory Lap" | The New Yorker (October 5, 2009) | Tenth of December |
| "Fox 8" | McSweeney's "San Francisco Panorama" (January 2010) | Fox 8 |
| "Escape from Spiderhead" | The New Yorker (December 20–27, 2010) | Tenth of December |
| "Home" | The New Yorker (June 13, 2011) | Tenth of December |
| "My Chivalric Fiasco" | Harper's (September 2011) | Tenth of December |
| "Tenth of December" | The New Yorker (October 31, 2011) | Tenth of December |
| "The Semplica Girl Diaries" | The New Yorker (October 15, 2012) | Tenth of December |
| "Mother's Day" | The New Yorker (February 8–15, 2016) | Liberation Day |
| "Elliott Spencer" | The New Yorker (August 19, 2019) | Liberation Day |
| "Love Letter" | The New Yorker (April 6, 2020) | Liberation Day |
| "Ghoul" | The New Yorker (November 9, 2020) | Liberation Day |
| "The Mom of Bold Action" | The New Yorker (August 30, 2021) | Liberation Day |
| "Liberation Day" | Liberation Day (2022) | Liberation Day |
| "A Thing at Work" | Liberation Day (2022) | Liberation Day |
| "Sparrow" | Liberation Day (2022) | Liberation Day |
| "My House" | Liberation Day (2022) | Liberation Day |
| "Thursday" | The New Yorker (June 12, 2023) | - |
| "The Third Premier" | The New Yorker (August 29, 2024) | - |
| "The Moron Factory" | The Atlantic (March 2025) | - |
