= CivilWarLand in Bad Decline =

Collection of George Saunders short stories published 1992-1995

- First edition
- Author: George Saunders
- Language: English
- Genre: Speculative fiction ● literary fiction
- Publisher: Random House
- Publication date: January 16, 1996
- Publication place: United States
- Media type: Print (hardcover)
- Pages: 192
- ISBN: 9780679448129
- OCLC: 820870821

CivilWarLand in Bad Decline is a book of short stories and a novella by the American writer George Saunders. Published in 1996, it was Saunders's first book. Many of the stories initially appeared in different forms in various magazines, including Kenyon Review, Harper's, The New Yorker and Quarterly West. The collection was listed as a Notable Book of 1996 by The New York Times, as well as a finalist for the 1996 PEN/Hemingway Award.

== Contents ==
Story	Originally published in	Year
"CivilWarLand in Bad Decline"	Kenyon Review	1992
"Isabelle"	Indiana Review	1994
"The Wavemaker Falters"	Witness	1993
"The 400-Pound CEO"	Harper's	1993
"Offloading for Mrs. Schwartz"	The New Yorker	1992
"Downtrodden Mary's Failed Campaign of Terror"	Quarterly West	1992
"Bounty"	Harper's	1995

== Reception ==
In a rave review in The New York Times, Michiko Kakutani had high praise for Saunders' writing style: "He's a savage satirist with a sentimental streak who delineates, in these pages, the dark underbelly of the American dream: the losses, delusions and terrors suffered by the lonely, the disenfranchised, the downtrodden and the plain unlucky." Comparing him to Nathanael West, she concluded, "Mr. Saunders' satiric vision of America is dark and demented; it's also ferocious and very funny."

In the same magazine, Jay McInerney dismissed the story "Downtrodden Mary's Failed Campaign of Terror" as having too many "wacky tics" but still described the overall collection as "just about the quirkiest and most accomplished short-story debut since Barry Hannah's 'Airships'", a 1978 collection. McInerney also said, "Quite unexpectedly, between guffaws, you find yourself moved. Mr. Saunders is one of those rare writers who can effortlessly blend satire and sentiment", particularly praising the story "Offloading for Mrs. Schwartz".

A reviewer for Kirkus Reviews wrote that the "politics of scarcity are brilliantly fictionalized in these smart and understated stories". Novelist Thomas Pynchon also saw in Saunders a vital new voice in American fiction: "An astoundingly tuned voice—graceful, dark, authentic, and funny—telling just the kinds of stories we need to get us through these times.”

In Publishers Weekly, conversely, a reviewer lauded Saunders as having a rich vision and "occasionally heart-melting prose", but stated that there is little difference in voice to distinguish one story from another. Richard Eder wrote in the Los Angeles Times that "Saunders can be wickedly ingenious and very funny. He takes a conversational line and disrupts it into comic disquiet. [...] Saunders is an imaginative ironist and an inventive absurdist". However, Eder also argued that the author has a weaker sense of moral engagement than satirists like George Orwell and Jonathan Swift, as well as too little narration, with the critic billing "Bounty" as "a series of scenes set one beside the other without much sense of development".

== Awards, honors and other appearances ==
- Two stories from the collection received the National Magazine Award for Fiction: "The 400-Pound CEO" in 1994, and "Bounty" in 1996.
