= Kelly Link =

American editor and author (born 1969)

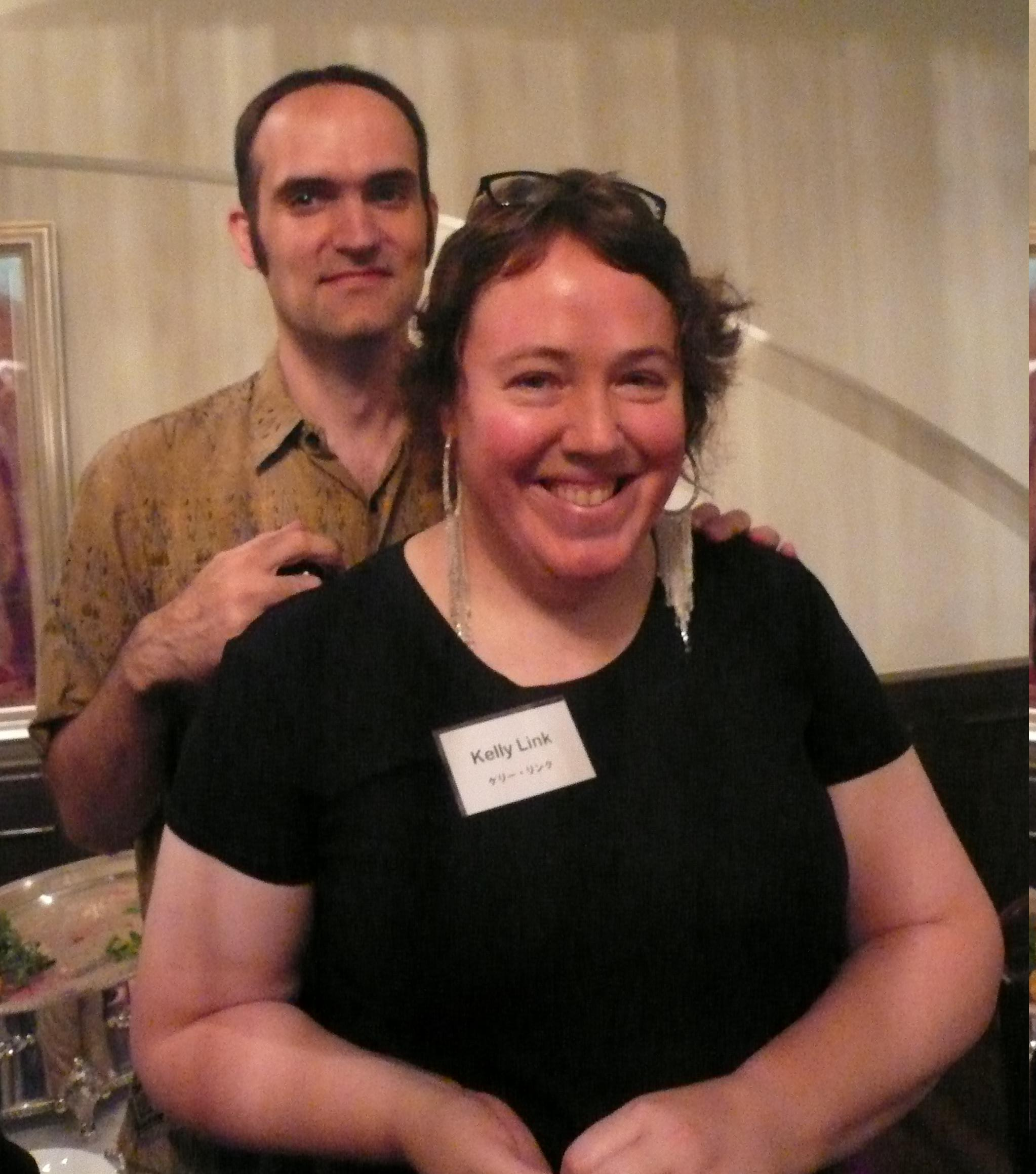
- Kelly Link and Gavin Grant
- Born: July 19, 1969 (age 57); Miami, Florida, U.S.
- Education: Columbia University (BA); University of North Carolina, Greensboro (MFA)
- Occupations: Writer, professor, bookseller
- Spouse: Gavin Grant
- Children: 1
- Writing career
- Genres: Fantasy, horror, magical realism
- Notable awards: MacArthur Fellowship; Hugo Award; Nebula Award; World Fantasy Award
- Website: kellylink.net

Kelly Link (born July 19, 1969) is an American editor and writer. Mainly known as an author of short stories, she published her first novel, The Book of Love, in 2024. Many of her stories have been described as slipstream or magical realism, combining science fiction, fantasy, horror, and literary fiction. She has won a Hugo Award, three Nebula Awards, and three World Fantasy Awards. She was one of the recipients of the 2018 MacArthur Fellowship.

== Early life and education ==
Kelly Link was born in Miami, Florida. Her father was a minister who later became a psychologist. Her family moved often during her childhood, living in Tennessee, Philadelphia, Miami again, and finally North Carolina when Link was in high school. As a teenager, she wrote poetry and worked on her school’s literary magazine.

She graduated from Columbia University in 1991. She spent her junior year of college studying abroad at the University of St. Andrews in Scotland. Link later received her MFA in writing from the University of North Carolina at Greensboro.

In 1995, she attended the Clarion East Writing Workshop.

== Career ==
She and her husband, Gavin Grant, founded Small Beer Press, a publisher based in Northampton, Massachusetts. The company focused on publishing books of "short stories that straddle the line between genre and literary fiction." Small Beer Press has an imprint for intermediate readers called Big Mouth House.

As Link was sending out her own first collection of stories to big publishing houses, she would hear from editors and agents who were interested in her work, but weren't sure how to market it. Link and Grant decided to publish the book themselves and Stranger Things Happen was released by Small Beer Press in 2001.

Link and Grant co-edit the literary zine Lady Churchill's Rosebud Wristlet, published by Small Beer Press. They also co-edited St. Martin's Press's The Year's Best Fantasy and Horror anthology series with Ellen Datlow for five years, ending in 2008. Link was previously the slush reader for Sci Fiction.

Her fifth short story collection, Get in Trouble, was a finalist for the 2016 Pulitzer Prize in Fiction.

In 2019, Link and Grant opened Book Moon, an independent bookstore in Easthampton, Massachusetts.

Link taught at Lenoir–Rhyne University in Hickory, North Carolina, with the Visiting Writers Series during the 2005-2006 semester. She has taught at a number of schools and workshops including Bard College, Cleveland State University, the Clarion Workshop at Michigan State University, University of Massachusetts Amherst, and the Clarion West Writers Workshop. She previously taught at Smith College, where she was the Elizabeth Drew Professor of English Language and Literature.

In 2018, she received a MacArthur Fellowship. She received an honorary degree from Smith College in 2023.

In 2024, Random House published Link's first novel, The Book of Love. In his review for NPR, Gabino Iglesias wrote, "For years, fans of Kelly Link, one of the finest purveyors of contemporary short fiction, have wondered what the author would be able to do with a full novel...this novel is proof that Link can be as strange, entertaining, and witty in novel form as she is when writing short stories." The book won the 2024 Los Angeles Times Book Prize in Science Fiction, Fantasy, and Speculative Fiction.

== Awards ==
Work	Year & Award	Category	Result	Ref.
"Travels with the Snow Queen"	1997 Otherwise Award		Won	
"Travels with the Snow Queen"	1999 World Fantasy Award	Short Fiction	Nominated	
"The Specialist's Hat"	1999 World Fantasy Award	Short Fiction	Won	
"Shoe and Marriage"	2001 World Fantasy Award	Short Fiction	Nominated	
"Louise's Ghost"	2001 Nebula Award	Novelette	Won	
Stranger Things Happen	2001 Salon Book Award	Fiction	Won	
Stranger Things Happen	2002 World Fantasy Award	Collection	Nominated	
Stranger Things Happen	2002 SF Site Readers Poll	SF/Fantasy Book	5th Place	
Stranger Things Happen	2002 Locus Award	Collection	Finalist	
"Lull"	2003 Locus Award	Novelette	Finalist	
Small Beer Press (with Gavin Grant)	2003 World Fantasy Special Award—Non-professional		Nominated	
Small Beer Press (with Gavin Grant)	2004 World Fantasy Special Award—Professional		Nominated	
Small Beer Press (with Gavin Grant)	2005 World Fantasy Special Award—Professional		Nominated	
Small Beer Press (with Gavin Grant)	2023 World Fantasy Special Award—Professional		Nominated	
The Year's Best Fantasy and Horror (17th Annual Collection) (with Ellen Datlow and Gavin Grant)	2004 Bram Stoker Award	Anthology	Won	
The Year's Best Fantasy and Horror (17th Annual Collection) (with Ellen Datlow and Gavin Grant)	2005 Locus Award	Anthology	Finalist	
The Year's Best Fantasy and Horror (17th Annual Collection) (with Ellen Datlow and Gavin Grant)	2005 British Fantasy Award	Anthology	Shortlisted	
Small Beer Press and Big Mouth House (with Gavin Grant)	2009 World Fantasy Special Award—Professional		Won	
"The Faery Handbag"	2004 BSFA Award	Short Fiction	Shortlisted	
"The Faery Handbag"	2005 Locus Award	Novelette	Won	
"The Faery Handbag"	2005 World Fantasy Award	Short Fiction	Nominated	
"The Faery Handbag"	2005 Hugo Award	Novelette	Won	
"The Faery Handbag"	2005 Nebula Award	Novelette	Won	
"The Faery Handbag"	2012 Premio Ignotus	Foreign Story	Nominated	
"Catskin"	2004 Locus Award	Novelette	Finalist	
"The Hortlak"	2004 Locus Award	Novelette	Finalist	
"The Hortlak"	2004 World Fantasy Award	Novella	Nominated	
Trampoline	2004 Locus Award	Anthology	Finalist	
Trampoline	2004 World Fantasy Award	Anthology	Nominated	
"Stone Animals"	2005 Locus Award	Novelette	Finalist	
"Stone Animals"	2005 Theodore Sturgeon Award	Short Science Fiction	Finalist	
Magic for Beginners (novella)	2005 BSFA Award	Short Fiction	Won	
Magic for Beginners (novella)	2006 Locus Award	Novella	Won	
Magic for Beginners (novella)	2006 SF Site Readers Poll	SF/Fantasy Book	5th Place	
Magic for Beginners (novella)	2006 World Fantasy Award	Novella	Nominated	
Magic for Beginners (novella)	2006 Hugo Award	Novella	Finalist	
Magic for Beginners (novella)	2005 Nebula Award	Novella	Won	
Magic for Beginners (novella)	2006 Theodore Sturgeon Award	Short Science Fiction	3rd Place	
Magic for Beginners (novella)	2008 Grand prix de l'imaginaire	Foreign Short Story/Collection of Foreign Short Stories	Finalist	
Magic for Beginners	2005 International Horror Guild Award	Collection	Finalist	
Magic for Beginners	2005 Bram Stoker Award	Fiction Collection	Finalist	
Magic for Beginners	2005 Salon Book Award		Won	
Magic for Beginners	2006 Locus Award	Collection	Won	
Magic for Beginners	2006 Young Lions Fiction Award		Finalist	
Magic for Beginners	2006 World Fantasy Award	Collection	Nominated	
"Some Zombie Contingency Plans"	2005 Bram Stoker Award	Long Fiction	Finalist	
"Some Zombie Contingency Plans"	2006 Locus Award	Short Story	Finalist	
The Year's Best Fantasy and Horror (18th Annual Collection) (with Ellen Datlow and Gavin Grant)	2006 Locus Award	Anthology	Won	
The Year's Best Fantasy and Horror (19th Annual Collection) (with Ellen Datlow and Gavin Grant)	2007 Locus Award	Anthology	Finalist	
The Year's Best Fantasy and Horror (19th Annual Collection) (with Ellen Datlow and Gavin Grant)	2007 British Fantasy Award	Anthology	Shortlisted	
Lady Churchill's Rosebud Wristlet (with Gavin Grant)	2007 Hugo Award	Semiprozine	Finalist	
The Best of Lady Churchill's Rosebud Wristlet	2008 Locus Award	Anthology	Finalist	
The Year's Best Fantasy and Horror (20th Annual Collection) (with Ellen Datlow and Gavin Grant)	2008 Locus Award	Anthology	Finalist	
"Pretty Monsters"	2009 Locus Award	Novella	Won	
Pretty Monsters	2009 Locus Award	Collection	Finalist	
Pretty Monsters	2009 World Fantasy Award	Collection	Nominated	
The Surfer	2009 Locus Award	Novella	Finalist	
The Year's Best Fantasy and Horror (21st Annual Collection) (with Ellen Datlow and Gavin Grant)	2009 Locus Award	Anthology	Finalist	
The Year's Best Fantasy and Horror (21st Annual Collection) (with Ellen Datlow and Gavin Grant)	2009 World Fantasy Award	Anthology	Nominated	
"Secret Identity"	2010 Locus Award	Novelette	Finalist	
"The Cinderella Game"	2010 Locus Award	Short Story	Finalist	
"The Summer People"	2011 Shirley Jackson Award	Novelette	Won	
"The Summer People"	2012 Locus Award	Novelette	Finalist	
"The Summer People"	2013 O. Henry Award		Juror Favorite	
Steampunk!: An Anthology of Fantastically Rich and Strange Stories (with Gavin Grant)	2012 Locus Award	Anthology	Finalist	
"Valley of the Girls"	2012 Locus Award	Short Story	Finalist	
"I Can See Right Through You"	2015 Locus Award	Novelette	Finalist	
"I Can See Right Through You"	2015 World Fantasy Award	Short Fiction	Nominated	
Monstrous Affections (with Gavin Grant)	2015 Locus Award	Anthology	Finalist	
Monstrous Affections (with Gavin Grant)	2015 World Fantasy Award	Anthology	Won	
"The Lady and the Fox"	2015 Locus Award	Short Story	Finalist	
"The New Boyfriend"	2015 Locus Award	Novelette	Finalist	
Get in Trouble	2016 Shirley Jackson Award	Collection	Finalist	
Get in Trouble	2016 World Fantasy Award	Collection	Nominated	
Get in Trouble	2016 Pulitzer Prize for Fiction		Finalist	
Get in Trouble	2016 Locus Award	Collection	Finalist	
Get in Trouble	2016 Indies Choice Book Awards	Adult Fiction	Finalist	
"The Game of Smash and Recovery"	2016 Locus Award	Short Story	Finalist	
"The Game of Smash and Recovery"	2016 Theodore Sturgeon Award	Short Science Fiction	Won	
	2017 World Fantasy Special Award—Professional award	Contributions to the Genre	Nominated	
"The Girl Who Did Not Know Fear"	2020 Locus Award	Short Story	Finalist	
"Skinder's Veil"	2022 Locus Award	Novelette	Finalist	
White Cat, Black Dog	2023 Kirkus Prize	Fiction	Finalist	
White Cat, Black Dog	2024 BookTube Prize	Fiction	Octofinalist	
White Cat, Black Dog	2024 World Fantasy Award	Collection	Nominated	
White Cat, Black Dog	2024 Locus Award	Collection	Won	
White Cat, Black Dog	2024 Chautauqua Prize		Shortlisted	
White Cat, Black Dog	2024 Mark Twain American Voice in Literature Award		Shortlisted	
"Prince Hat Underground"	2024 World Fantasy Award	Novella	Nominated	
"Prince Hat Underground"	2024 Locus Award	Novelette	Finalist	
The Book of Love	2024 Center for Fiction First Novel Prize		Longlisted	
The Book of Love	2024 Los Angeles Times Book Prize	Science Fiction, Fantasy, and Speculative Fiction	Won	
The Book of Love	2024 Nebula Award	Novel	Finalist	
The Book of Love	2025 Compton Crook Award	Novel	Finalist	

== Bibliography ==
=== Collections ===
- Stranger Things Happen. Small Beer Press. 2001. ISBN 9781931520003.
- Magic for Beginners. Small Beer Press. 2005. ISBN 9780812986518.
- Pretty Monsters. Viking Books for Young Readers. 2008. ISBN 9781101215425.
- The Wrong Grave. Text Publishing. 2009. ISBN 9781921520730.
- Get in Trouble. Random House. 2016. ISBN 9780812986495.
- White Cat, Black Dog: Stories. Random House. 2023. ISBN 9780593449950.

=== Novels ===
- The Book of Love. Random House. 2024. ISBN 9780812986501.

=== Selected stories ===
- "The Game of Smash and Recovery"
- "The Summer People"
- "Pretty Monsters"
- "Magic for Beginners"
- "The Faery Handbag"
- "Stone Animals"
- "Louise's Ghost"
- "The Specialist's Hat"
- "Travels with the Snow Queen"

=== As editor ===
- Trampoline (Small Beer Press, 2003)
- The Year's Best Fantasy & Horror, Volumes 17 - 21 (with Ellen Datlow and Gavin J. Grant, St. Martin's Griffin, 2004 - 2008)
- Steampunk! An Anthology of Fantastically Rich and Strange Stories (with Gavin J. Grant, Candlewick Press, 2011)
- Monstrous Affections: An Anthology of Beastly Tales (with Gavin J. Grant, Candlewick Press, 2014)
- The Best of Lady Churchill's Rosebud Wristlet (with Gavin J. Grant, Del Rey Books, 2007)
