= Magic for Beginners (short story collection) =

2005 collection of short fiction works by Kelly Link

- Author: Kelly Link
- Language: English
- Genre: Fantasy, Horror
- Publisher: Small Beer Press
- Publication date: July 1, 2005
- Publication place: United States
- Media type: Print
- Pages: 297
- ISBN: 978-1931520157

Magic for Beginners is a collection of nine works of fantasy and light horror short fiction by American writer Kelly Link, released by Small Beer Press in 2005. The stories were all previously published in other venues from 2002 to 2005.

The book won the 2006 Locus Award for Best Collection.

== Stories ==
- "The Faery Handbag"
- "The Hortlak"
- "The Cannon"
- "Stone Animals"
- "Catskin"
- "Some Zombie Contingency Plans"
- "The Great Divorce"
- "Magic for Beginners"
- "Lull"

== Reception ==
In a starred review, Publishers Weekly described the collection as "effervescent blends of quirky humor and pathos that transform stock themes of genre fiction into the stuff of delicate lyrical fantasy... Not only does Link find fresh perspectives from which to explore familiar premises, she also forges ingenious connections between disparate images and narrative approaches to suggest a convincing alternate logic that shapes the worlds of her highly original fantasies."

Salon noted, "[Link's] prose is fresh and unaffected, yet honed to the essential... works that delicately knit together crowd-pleasing genre and folk-tale elements with challenging experimentation."

In her review for Strange Horizons, Geneva Melzack wrote "What makes the stories in Magic for Beginners particularly fascinating, and sometimes perplexing, is the way in which the conversations they're conducting with literary genres, forms, and traditions are begging questions rather than trying to provide answers... Magic for Beginners is a collection of beautifully poignant, and sometimes sinister, pieces of short fiction."

== Awards ==
The book won the 2006 Locus Award for Best Collection. It was a finalist for the 2005 Bram Stoker Award and 2005 International Horror Guild Award. The collection was also a finalist for the 2006 Young Lions Fiction Award and 2006 World Fantasy Award.

The title story, "Magic for Beginners", won the 2005 Nebula Award for Best Novella, 2006 Locus Award for Best Novella, and 2006 BSFA Award for best short fiction. Another story in the collection, "The Faery Handbag", won the 2005 Hugo Award for Best Novelette, 2005 Nebula Award for Best Novelette, and 2005 Locus Award for Best Novelette.
