= Joseph Kosinski =

American film director (born 1974)

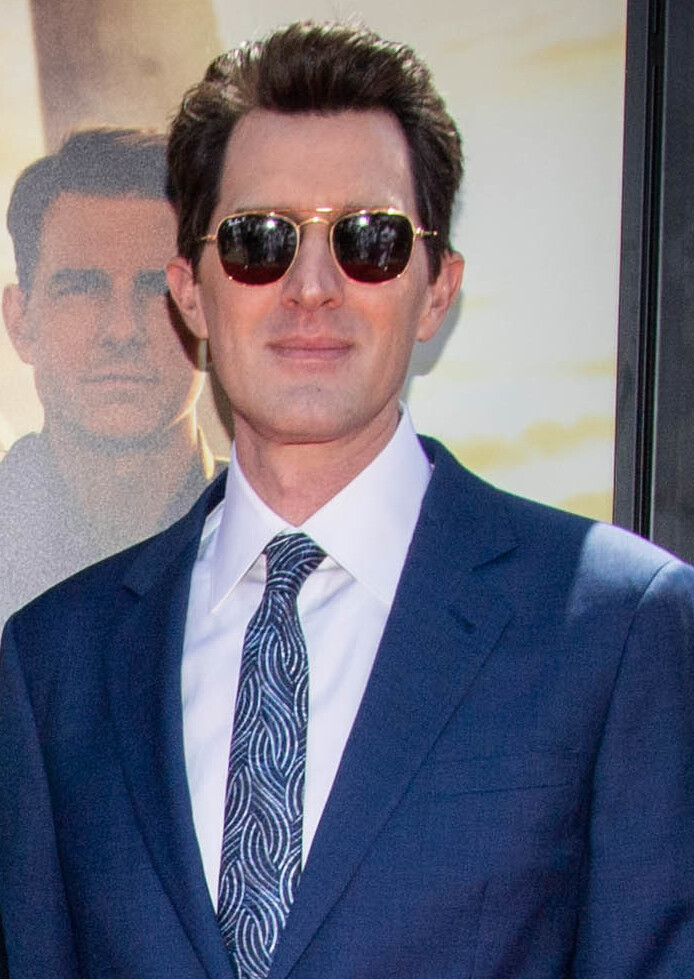
- Kosinski at the Naval Air Station North Island in 2022
- Born: May 3, 1974 (age 52); Marshalltown, Iowa, U.S.
- Education: Columbia University; Stanford University
- Occupations: Film director; producer; screenwriter
- Years active: 1999–present
- Spouse: Kristin Kosinski
- Website: josephkosinski.com

Joseph Kosinski (born May 3, 1974) is an American film director. He is best known for directing the films Tron: Legacy (2010), Oblivion (2013), Only the Brave (2017), Top Gun: Maverick, Spiderhead (both 2022), and F1 (2025). His previous work in computer graphics and computer-generated imagery (CGI) was primarily with CGI-related television commercials including the "Starry Night" commercial for Halo 3 and the award-winning "Mad World" commercial for Gears of War.

== Life and career ==
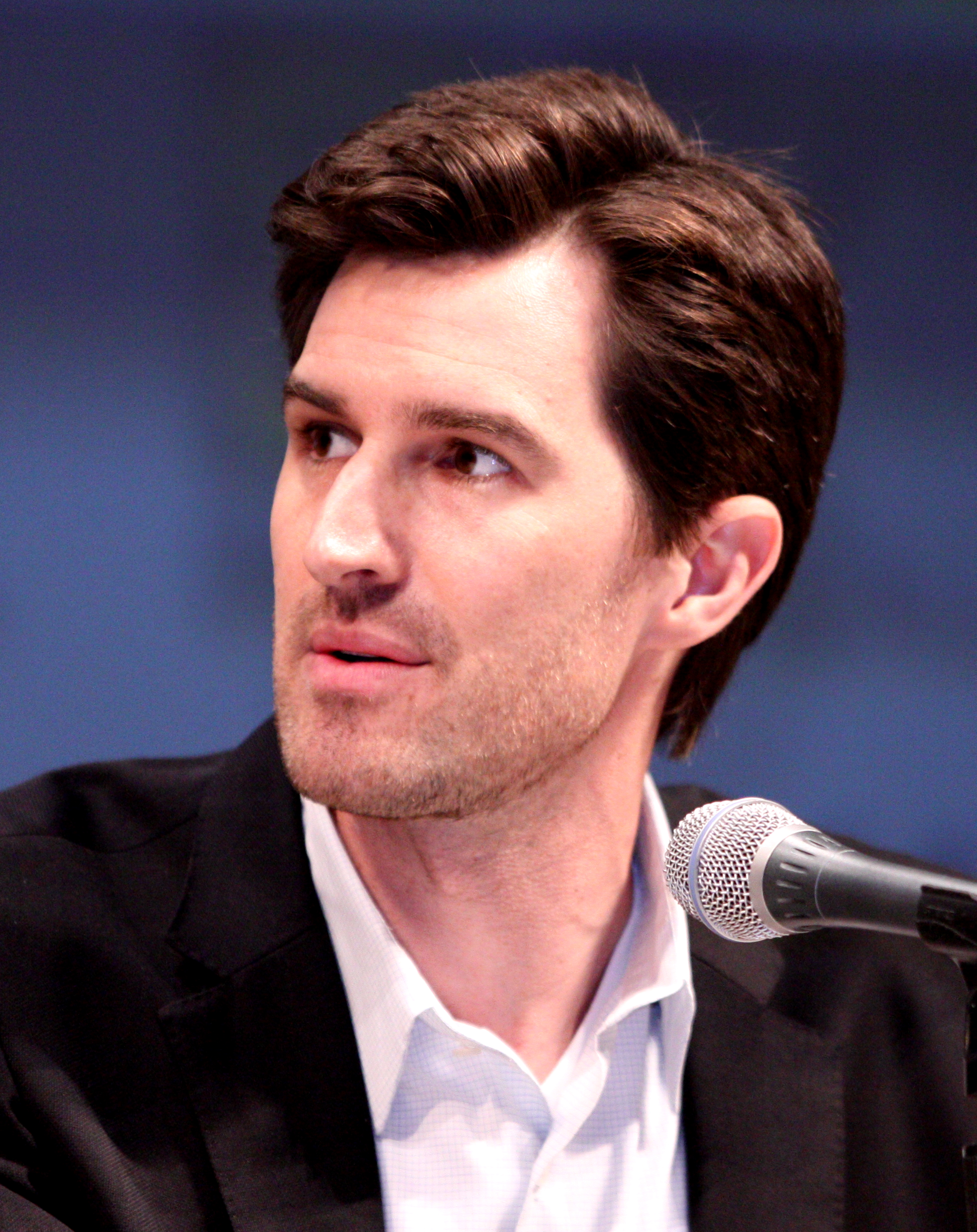
Kosinski in 2010

Kosinski grew up in Marshalltown, Iowa, the son of Patricia (née Provost) of Skokie, Illinois, and Joel Kosinski, a doctor of Polish descent. After graduating from Marshalltown High School in 1992, he studied mechanical engineering at Stanford University and architecture at Columbia University Graduate School of Architecture, Planning and Preservation.

While teaching at Columbia after graduating in 1999, Kosinski co-founded a design firm, KDLAB, with a classmate, Dean Di Simone, where he made digital short films, and went into directing commercials. Kosinski signed with Anonymous Content after moving to Los Angeles and meeting David Fincher.

His first major film was the special effects-heavy Tron: Legacy. The film was in Disney Digital 3-D and IMAX 3D, with a release of December 2010 and grossed $400 million worldwide.

After moving to Los Angeles in 2005, he began writing a film treatment which would eventually develop into an unpublished graphic novel by the title Oblivion for Radical Comics. In August 2010, Walt Disney Pictures acquired the rights to the work. William Monahan worked on the screenplay for a film adaptation. In March 2011, it was reported that Karl Gajdusek would rewrite the screenplay. Attempts to keep the film with a PG rating were unsuccessful, leading to Disney giving up the rights which were acquired by Universal Pictures, and agreed to a PG-13 rating. The $120-million-budgeted Oblivion began filming in March 2012, with Tom Cruise in the lead role, and was released in April 2013 to mixed reviews and grossed $286 million worldwide.

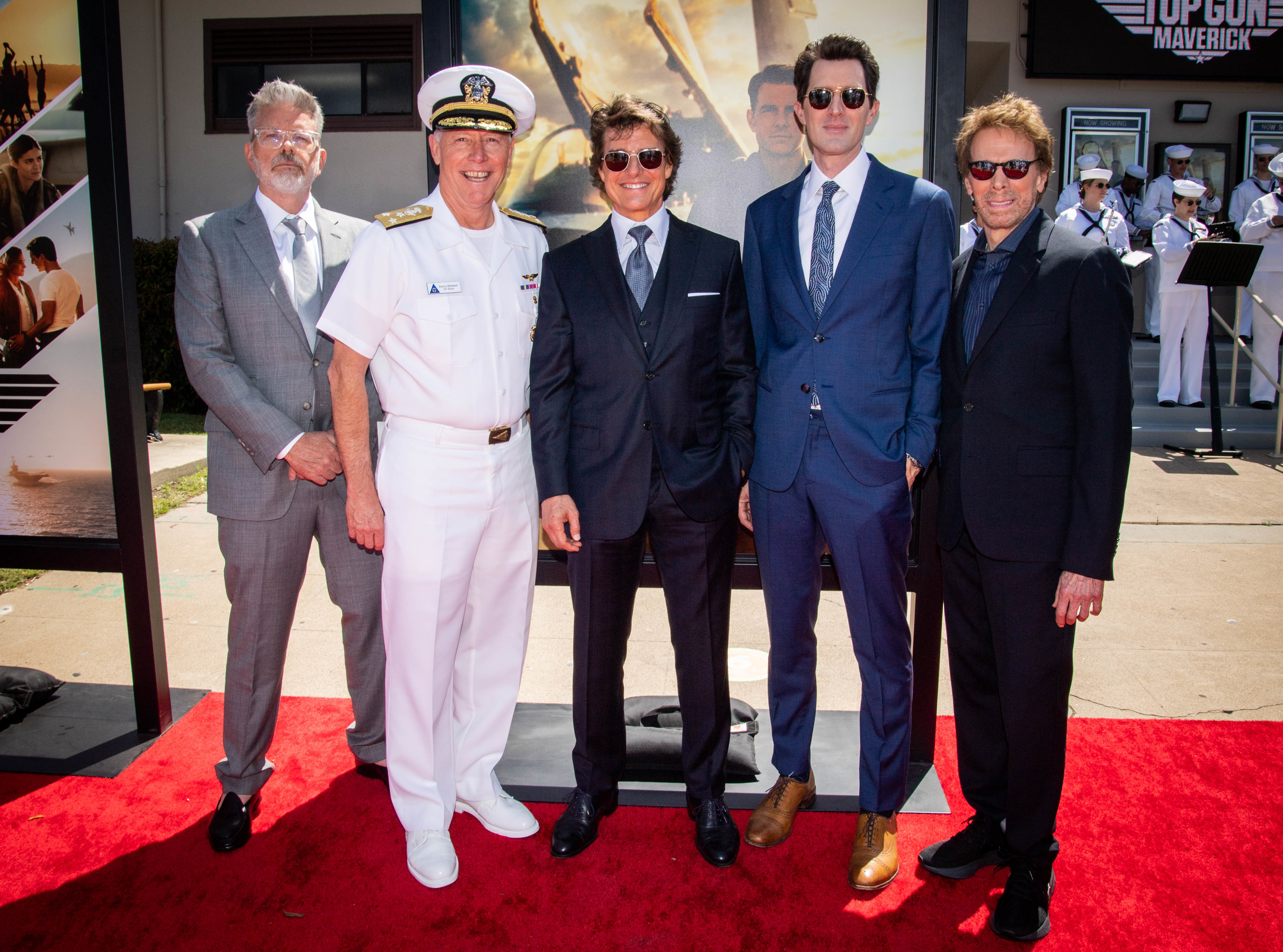
Producer Christopher McQuarrie, admiral Kenneth R. Whitesell, Tom Cruise, Kosinski, and Jerry Bruckheimer at the Naval Air Station North Island premiere of Top Gun: Maverick

In 2017, he directed Only the Brave, originally titled Granite Mountain, based on the true story of the Granite Mountain Hotshots (wildland firefighters). In June 2017, it was announced he was set to direct the sequel to Top Gun, titled Top Gun: Maverick, reuniting with Oblivion star Tom Cruise. The film was released in theatres on May 27, 2022, by Paramount Pictures and grossed $1.496 billion worldwide, becoming Cruise's highest-grossing film at the box office.

Kosinski also directed a Formula One racing film named F1, reteaming with Top Gun: Maverick producer Jerry Bruckheimer and screenwriter Ehren Kruger, with racing driver Lewis Hamilton also serving as producer. The project, acquired by Apple Studios in June 2022, stars Brad Pitt received an exclusive theatrical run "of at least 30 days" starting internationally on June 25, 2025, and in North America on June 27, 2025, before streaming on Apple TV+.

On February 18, 2025, it was announced that Kosinski and Bruckheimer would reunite on an untitled conspiracy thriller film centred around UFOs, with Zach Baylin writing the screenplay. On March 24, it was announced that the project had been acquired by Apple Studios.

In April 2025, it was announced that Kosinski would direct a Miami Vice film with a script by Dan Gilroy and Eric Warren Singer. This film would be developed after his upcoming UFO conspiracy thriller. It will be a reboot of the Miami Vice franchise following the original television series and 2006 film. The film is set to begin filming in 2026, with a May 19, 2028 release date.

=== Unrealized projects ===
Kosinski has been attached to several as-of-now-unmade projects, including remakes of '70s science-fiction films Logan's Run and The Black Hole, the science-fiction film Archangels, an untitled action-thriller from Halt and Catch Fire writers Christopher Cantwell and Christopher C. Rogers, and The Twilight Zone.

Kosinski was confirmed to direct the third Tron film in March 2015, but in May of the same year it was announced that Disney had canceled the project.

Kosinski also signed on to direct a film adaptation of the Gran Turismo video game series for Sony Pictures in March 2015, but in February 2018, it was reported the project was no longer moving forward. The project would eventually be directed by Neill Blomkamp and released in theatres on August 25, 2023.

In June 2020, he was hired to direct the reboot of Twister for Universal Pictures, the original film's international distributor, but in October 2022, Kosinski stepped down after the project was repurposed into a legacy-sequel, Twisters, and replaced by Lee Isaac Chung as director; Kosinski was ultimately credited for the film's story.

=== Academia ===
Kosinski is an alumnus of Columbia Graduate School of Architecture, Planning and Preservation (GSAPP), and was an adjunct assistant professor of architecture helping students in 3D modeling and graphics. In 2008, he spoke in detail about his education in architecture, pushing the technological envelope in commercials and his eventual progression to feature films.

== Awards ==
- 2007 AICP Show – Best Visual Effects for the Gears of War commercial "Mad World" – Nominated
- AICP Best Visual Effects Award for his Assassin's Creed "Unity" and Destiny "Become Legend" commercials – Nominated
- Saturn Award for Best Film Director for Top Gun: Maverick – Nominated
- Directors Guild of America Award for Outstanding Directing for Top Gun: Maverick – Nominated
- Academy Award for Best Picture for F1 - Nominated

== Filmography ==
=== Feature film ===
Year	Title	Director	Producer	Story	Notes
2010	Tron: Legacy	Yes	No	No	
2013	Oblivion	Yes	Yes	No	Based on his graphic novel
2017	Only the Brave	Yes	No	No	
2022	Top Gun: Maverick	Yes	No	No	
2022	Spiderhead	Yes	No	No	
2024	Twisters	No	No	Yes	
2025	F1	Yes	Yes	Yes	
2028	Miami Vice '85 †	Yes	Yes	No	Filming

Executive producer

- Tron: Ares (2025)

=== Short film ===
Year	Title	Director	Writer	Notes
2008	TR2N	Yes	No	Teaser for Tron: Legacy
2017	The Dig	Yes	Yes	Made to demonstrate Sony's CineAlta Venice camera

=== Music video ===
- "Hold My Hand" – Lady Gaga (2022)

=== Commercials ===
- Nintendo DS – Touch (2004)
- Nike – Les Jumelles (2006)
- Gears of War – Mad World (2006)
- Halo 3 – Starry Night (2007)
- Saab Aero-X – Blackbird (2007)
- Hummer – Selector (2007)
- Chevrolet – Baby (2008)
- Halo 4 – Awakening (2011)
- Assassin's Creed Unity – Unity (2014)
- Destiny – Become Legend (2014)
- Destiny – Evil's Most Wanted (2015)
- Doom – Fight Like Hell (2016)
- Taco Bell – Web of Fries (2018)
- BMW i7 M70 – The Calm (2023)
- Chanel – Who Are You Coco Mademoiselle? (2023)
