= Carceri d'invenzione =

Series of prints by Giovanni Battista Piranesi

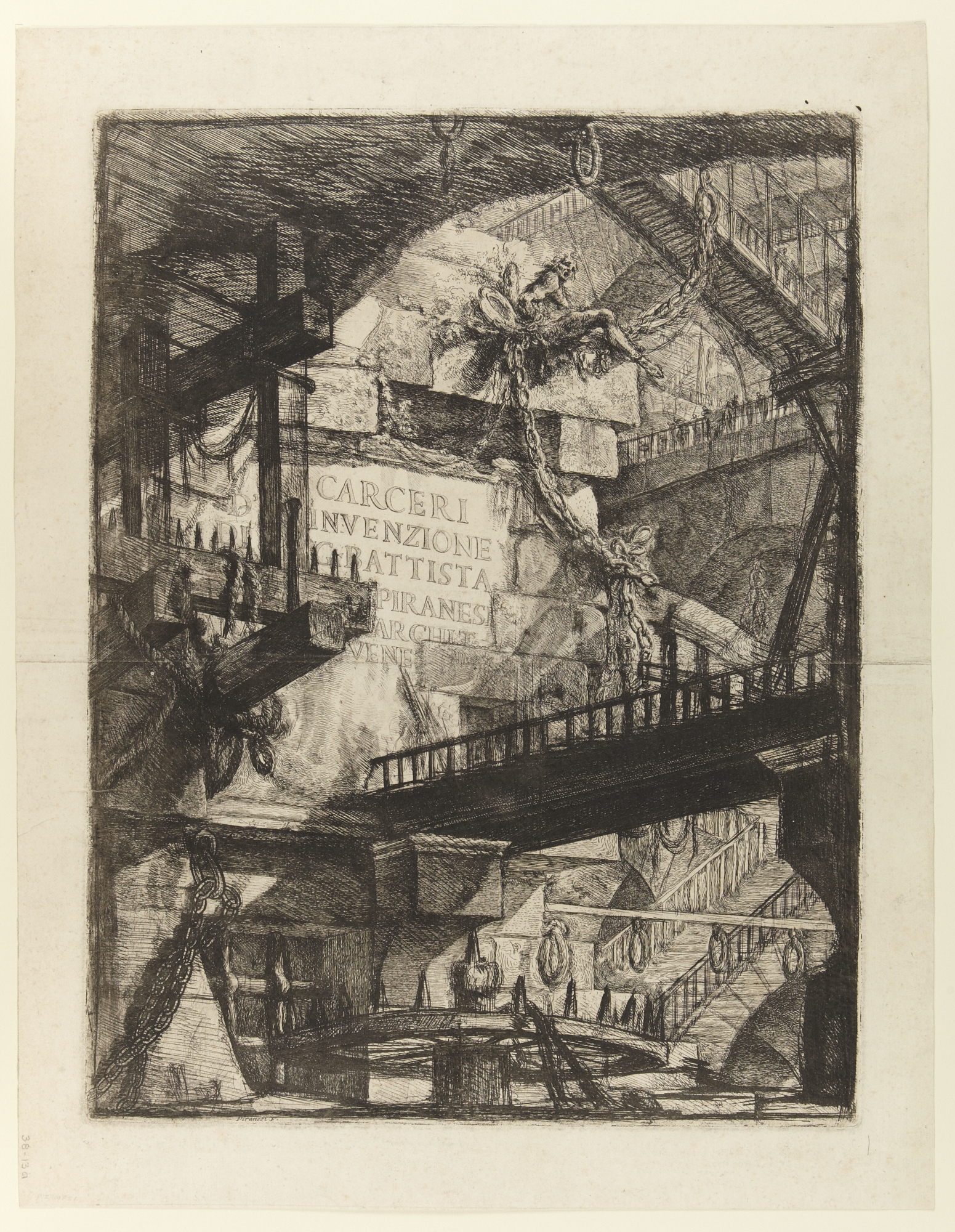
Title page, second edition, 1761

Carceri d'invenzione, often translated as Imaginary Prisons, is a series of 16 etchings by the Italian artist Giovanni Battista Piranesi, 14 produced from c. 1745 to 1750, when the first edition of the set was published. All depict enormous subterranean vaults with stairs and mighty machines, in rather extreme versions of the capriccio, a favourite Italian genre of architectural fantasies; the first title page uses the term.

The series was started in 1745, when Piranesi was already well known for more conventional prints of the ancient and modern buildings of Rome. The first state prints were published in 1750 and consisted of 14 etchings, untitled and unnumbered, with a sketch-like look. The original prints were 16" x 21". Piranesi reworked the prints a decade later, giving them a second states. For the second edition in 1761, all the etchings were reworked and numbered I–XVI (1–16), with numbers II and V new etchings in the series.

Despite being intensely personal imaginative creations, for Piranesi "a source of self-analysis and of creative release", aspects of the Carceri draw on Piranesi's early training as a set designer for the stage; prison scenes were often called for. Surviving drawings for complicated sets by Filippo Juvarra and Ferdinando Bibiena (both primarily architects) as well as others have evident similarities to the prints in their receding spaces and disappearing staircases. Number XI in the series is also very similar, in reverse, to a Piranesi drawing Study for a palatial interior in the British Museum.

The images influenced Romanticism and Surrealism. While the Vedutisti (or "view makers"), such as Canaletto and Bellotto, more often reveled in the beauty of the sunlit place, in Piranesi this vision takes on what from a modern perspective could be called a Kafkaesque distortion, seemingly erecting fantastic labyrinthine structures, epic in volume. They are capricci, whimsical aggregates of monumental architecture and ruin.

Numbers I to IX were all done in portrait format (vertical), while X to XVI were landscape format (horizontal). Piranesi seems to have been "diffident" about the reception of such unusual images, and the first edition title page does not name him as the artist, nor do most of the individual plates. Though untitled, they are sometimes given titles as below.

== Prints ==
First edition (1750)	Second edition (1761)	Number / Descriptive title	Text
		I / Title Plate	1st: ‘’INVENZIONE CAPRIC DI CARCERI ALL ACQUA FORTE DATTE IN LUCE DA GIOVANI BOUCHARD IN ROMA MERCANTE AL CORSO 2nd ’’CARCERI D’INVENZIONE DI G. BATTISTA PIRANESI ARCHIT. VENE’’
(None)		II / The Man on the Rack	Inscribed below busts at top, and on the pillar at left with names of "victims punished unjustly by Nero" as recorded by Tacitus.
		III / The Round Tower	
		IV / The Grand Piazza	
(None)		V / The Lion Bas-Reliefs	
		VI / The Smoking Fire	
		VII / The Drawbridge	Faint inscription on pier near centre
		VIII / The Staircase with Trophies	
		IX / The Giant Wheel	
		X / Prisoners on a Projecting Platform	
		XI / The Arch with a Shell Ornament	
		XII / The Sawhorse	
		XIII / The Well	
		XIV / The Gothic Arch	
		XV /The Pier with a Lamp	
		XVI / The Pier with Chains	2ND: AD TERROREM INCRESCEN AUDACIAE; IMPIETATI ET MALIS ARTIBUS, from Livy's life of Ancus Martius. INFAME SCELUS ... RI INFELICI SUSPE, a "paraphrase from the same work". There is a third inscription on the stele in the foreground.

== Background and creation ==
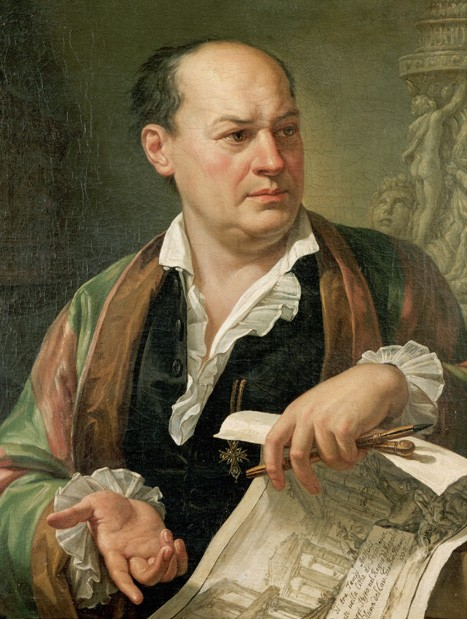
Pietro Labruzzi's portrait of Giovanni Battista Piranesi, 1779

Some preparatory drawings, mostly in ink wash, have survived, but for example two studies for Plate XIV in London and Edinburgh both differ significantly from each other and either state of the print (allowing for a reversal of the image between drawing and etching). But there are drawings for Plates VIII and XII that are close to the etchings. A drawing of Plate XIII appears to be a copy of the first edition print, as yet lacking the changes made for the second edition. Though the second edition was the last, Piranesi continued to print individual plates at least into the 1770s, experimenting with the printing "with regards to the effects of ink, in both extent and colour".

The first edition was reprinted together with Piranesi's archaeological Della Magnificenze ed Architettura de' Romani in 1751. The reworking all the plates underwent before the second edition around 1761, as well as perhaps effacing signs of wear on the plates, saw "heightened tonal contrasts and the introduction of more explicit details... the final traces of Rococo linear atmospheric subtleties were to be replaced by strongly bitten lines and broad areas of tonal contrast".

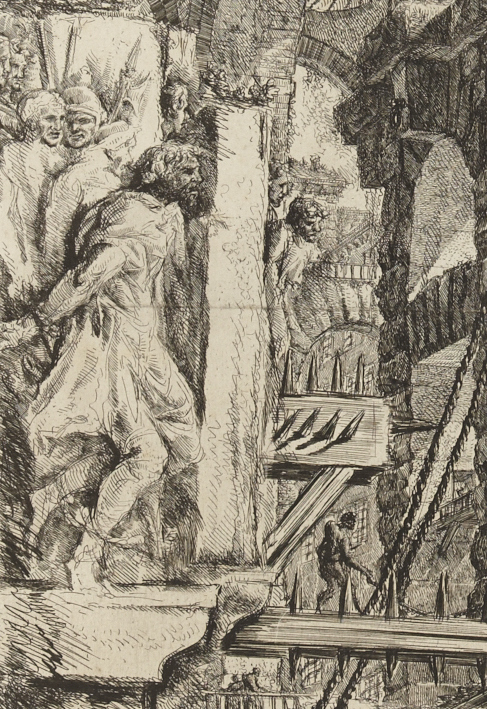
Detail from Plate V

The second edition takes a darker thematic, as well as visual, turn, with the new Plate II featuring a scene of torture near the bottom. In various plates new "penal apparatus in the form of chains, cables, gallows and sinsterly indistinct instruments of torture, many of them infused with a sense of decay through endless use."

In the second edition, some of the illustrations appear to have been reworked to contain deliberate impossible geometries. Wilton-Ely describes these as "visual ambivalences and contrived irrationality of space formulated in the early version and extended for new creative ends in the later one.

== Crime and punishment ==
The second edition in particular reflects Piranesi's idiosyncratic views on Italian history. In earlier works he had already deplored Greek influence on ancient Rome, and emphasized Rome's Etruscan heritage. The new Plates II and V, and the extensively reworked Plate XVI "reveal these new concerns in a more overt form", including inscriptions. Plate II has names and busts of "victims punished unjustly by Nero" as recorded by Tacitus, which Piranesi saw as "emphasizing the decline of Roman law under a philhellene emperor". The inscriptions in Plate XVI are quotations or paraphrases from Livy's history of the early Roman Republic, showing the justice of early Roman law. Plate V includes "a giant relief in a late Imperial style" of a prisoner in chains being "led to punishment".

== Reception ==
Thomas De Quincey in Confessions of an English Opium-Eater (1821) wrote:

Many years ago, when I was looking over Piranesi's Antiquities of Rome, Mr. Coleridge, who was standing by, described to me a set of plates by that artist ... which record the scenery of his own visions during the delirium of a fever: some of them (I describe only from memory of Mr. Coleridge's account) representing vast Gothic halls, on the floor of which stood all sorts of engines and machinery, wheels, cables, pulleys, levers, catapults, etc., etc., expressive of enormous power put forth, and resistance overcome. Creeping along the sides of the walls, you perceived a staircase; and upon it, groping his way upwards, was Piranesi himself: follow the stairs a little further, and you perceive it come to a sudden abrupt termination, without any balustrade, and allowing no step onwards to him.

An in-depth analysis of Piranesi's Carceri was written by Marguerite Yourcenar in her Dark Brain of Piranesi: and Other Essays (1984). The twentieth-century forger Eric Hebborn claimed to have forged Piranesi sketches.

== Further works ==
Piranesi's dark and seemingly endless staircases and blocked passages prefigure M. C. Escher's images, with endless stairs such as his 1960 lithograph "Ascending and Descending", and are said to have inspired Edgar Allan Poe's story "The Pit and the Pendulum". Piranesi's work inspired the Carceri d'invenzione series of chamber works by the English composer Brian Ferneyhough.

The 1998 film The Sound of the Carceri presents cellist Yo-Yo Ma performing works by Johann Sebastian Bach in a computer generated simulation of Piranesi's Carceri. The film is part of the Inspired by Bach series. The packaging for the 2001 album Amnesiac by Radiohead incorporates Carceri d'invenzione.

Susanna Clarke's novel Piranesi (2020) was inspired by Piranesi's Carceri etchings.
