= Jonathan Strange & Mr Norrell =

2004 novel by Susanna Clarke

- Black version of the first hardcover edition
- Author: Susanna Clarke
- Audio read by: Simon Prebble
- Illustrator: Portia Rosenberg
- Language: English
- Genre: Alternative history
- Publisher: Bloomsbury
- Publication date: 8 September 2004 (US); 30 September 2004 (UK)
- Publication place: United States; United Kingdom
- Media type: Print; audio; eBook
- Pages: 782
- ISBN: 9781582344164 (First edition US hardcover)
- OCLC: 974294356
- Dewey Decimal: 823/.92
- LC Class: PR6103.L375 J65 2004

Jonathan Strange & Mr Norrell is the debut novel by British writer Susanna Clarke. Published in 2004, it is an alternative history set in 19th-century England around the time of the Napoleonic Wars. Its premise is that magic once existed in England and has returned with two men: Gilbert Norrell and Jonathan Strange. Centred on the relationship between these two men, the novel investigates the nature of "Englishness" and the boundaries between reason and unreason, Anglo-Saxon and Anglo-Dane, and Northern and Southern English cultural tropes. It has been described as a fantasy novel, an alternative history, and a historical novel.

The narrative draws on various Romantic literary traditions, such as the comedy of manners, the Gothic tale, and the Byronic hero. The novel's language is a pastiche of 19th-century writing styles, such as those of Jane Austen and Charles Dickens.

Clarke began writing Jonathan Strange & Mr Norrell in 1992; ten years later she submitted the manuscript for publication. It was accepted by Bloomsbury and published in September 2004, with illustrations by Portia Rosenberg. The novel was well received by critics and reached number three on the New York Times Best Seller list. It was longlisted for the 2004 Man Booker Prize and won the 2005 Hugo Award for Best Novel.

== Plot summary ==
=== Volume I: Mr Norrell ===
He hardly ever spoke of magic, and when he did it was like a history lesson and no one could bear to listen to him.

— Description of Mr Norrell

The novel opens in northern England in 1806 with the Learned Society of York Magicians. The "magicians" of the society are in fact merely theoreticians, since no one in England has been able to perform real magic for several centuries. The society is stunned to learn of a "practical magician", Mr Gilbert Norrell. Norrell proves his skill as a magician by making the statues in York Cathedral speak, thereafter compelling the society to disband. John Childermass, Mr Norrell's factotum, convinces a member of the group, John Segundus, to write about the event for the London newspapers.

Segundus's article generates interest in Mr Norrell, who moves to London to revive practical English magic. He enters society with the help of two gentlemen about town, the superficial and foppish Christopher Drawlight and the shrewd Henry Lascelles, and meets a Cabinet Minister, Sir Walter Pole. To ingratiate himself, Mr Norrell attempts to resurrect Sir Walter's fiancée, Emma Wintertowne, from the dead. He summons a fairy — "the Gentleman with the Thistledown Hair" — who strikes a bargain with Norrell to resurrect Emma, the price being that half of her restored life will be spent in Faerie. After news spreads of Emma's resurrection and happy marriage to Sir Walter, magic becomes respected, and the government seeks Norrell's aid in its ongoing war against Napoleon.

While living in London, Norrell encounters Vinculus, a disreputable street-magician vagabond, who relates a prophecy about a "nameless slave" and two magicians in England, but Norrell dismisses it and has Vinculus banished. While travelling, Vinculus meets Jonathan Strange and recites the same prophecy, prompting Strange to become a magician. Meanwhile, the Gentleman with the Thistledown Hair takes a liking to Stephen Black, Sir Walter's Negro butler, and promises to make him a king. Emma (now Lady Pole) lapses into lassitude; she rarely speaks and is distraught by bells, music, and parties. Each night she and Stephen are forced to attend balls held by the Gentleman with the Thistledown Hair in the Faerie kingdom of Lost-Hope, where they dance all night long; their attempts to communicate their situation are confounded by magic, with their speech rendered into nonsense.

"Can a magician kill a man by magic?" Lord Wellington asked Strange. Strange frowned. He seemed to dislike the question. "I suppose a magician might," he admitted, "but a gentleman never could."

— Conversation between Strange and the Duke of Wellington

=== Volume II: Jonathan Strange ===
In 1809, Strange learns of Mr Norrell and travels to London to meet him. They immediately clash over the importance of John Uskglass (the legendary Raven King) to English magic. Strange argues that "without the Raven King there would be no magic and no magicians" while Norrell retorts that the Raven King abandoned England and should be forgotten. Despite their differing opinions and temperaments, Norrell acknowledges Strange's magical ability and takes him on as a pupil, but deliberately keeps some knowledge from him.

The Stranges become a popular couple in London. Lady Pole and Strange's wife, Arabella, become friends; during a visit, Arabella meets the Gentleman with the Thistledown Hair, whom she assumes is a relative of the Poles. The Cabinet ministers find Strange easier to deal with than Norrell, so they send him to assist the Duke of Wellington on his Peninsular Campaign. For over a year, Strange helps the army: he creates roads, moves towns, and makes dead men speak. After he returns, he fails to cure George III's madness, but manages to save him from the Gentleman with the Thistledown Hair, who is determined to make Black king in his place. On Napoleon's escape from Elba and return to power, Strange re-enters Wellington's service, helping defeat Napoleon and the French at the Battle of Waterloo.

Upon returning to England, Strange finds that Drawlight has been defrauding English citizens of their money by promising to fulfil their wishes through Strange's magic. Drawlight's schemes are publicized and he is arrested. Norrell strongly wishes for him to be hanged for magic-related crimes, but has insufficient political influence. Lascelles becomes closer to Norrell, threatening the relationship between Childermass and his master.

Frustrated with being Norrell's pupil, Strange pens a scathing review of a book outlining Norrell's theories on modern magic; in particular, Strange challenges Norrell's views of the Raven King. The English public splits into "Norrellites" and "Strangites". Norrell confides to Strange that he wasted years attempting to summon the Raven King, but Strange disagrees that the effort is futile; the two agree to part company, although not without regret. Strange returns home and works on his own book, The History and Practice of English Magic. Arabella goes missing, then suddenly reappears, sick and weak. Three days later she dies.

=== Volume III: John Uskglass ===
It is the contention of Mr Norrell of Hanover-square that everything belonging to John Uskglass must be shaken out of modern magic, as one would shake moths and dust out of an old coat. What does he imagine he will have left? If you get rid of John Uskglass you will be left holding the empty air.

— Jonathan Strange, Prologue to The History and Practice of English Magic, pub. John Murray, London, 1816

In 1816, Lady Pole attempts to shoot Mr Norrell. Childermass takes the bullet himself, but is not killed. Lady Pole is sent to the countryside and cared for by John Segundus, who has an inkling of the magic surrounding her. During travels in the north, Black meets Vinculus, who recites his prophecy: "the nameless slave shall be a king in a strange country ..." Stephen, who was born into slavery and does not know his true name, believes it applies to him, but the Gentleman with the Thistledown Hair argues that it refers to the Raven King.

Strange travels to Venice and meets Flora Greysteel there. They become fond of each other and Strange's friends believe he may marry again. However, after experimenting with dangerous magic that threatens his sanity, he discovers that Arabella is alive and being held captive alongside Lady Pole in Lost-Hope as a result of the bargain Norrell struck with the fairy. The Gentleman with the Thistledown Hair curses Strange with an "Impenetrable Darkness", a pillar of darkness that engulfs him and follows him wherever he goes. Thereafter, Strange's strenuous efforts to rescue Arabella take their toll: his letters to his friends appear crazed and so his public reputation suffers. At Strange's request, Flora moves with her family to Padua and secludes herself, along with a mirror given to her by Strange. Drawlight is sent by Lascelles and Norrell to Venice to find out more about Strange's activities and on his arrival he is magically brought before Strange. Strange instructs him to deliver messages to Norrell, Childermass, and the magical community within England before dismissing him. Strange then re-invokes the old alliances that exist in England between the forces of nature and John Uskglass. This sparks a magical renaissance, reopening roads to Faerie, and causing many to spontaneously perform magic, but Norrell fails to grasp its significance.

Drawlight attempts to deliver the messages but is intercepted by Lascelles, who murders him, because if Norrell learnt the truth it would damage Lascelles's control over Norrell. Strange, bringing the Impenetrable Darkness with him, asks Norrell to help him undo Arabella's enchantment by summoning John Uskglass. Childermass explores a corner of Faerie and stumbles upon a castle, whose guardian challenges him to a duel; he declines. Lascelles takes on the guardian, wishing to preserve English honour, and succeeds in killing him, but this causes him to be trapped in the role of guardian himself.

Meanwhile, Childermass receives the message meant for him by Strange; he and Segundus use magic to break the enchantment over Lady Pole. Enraged by this, the Gentleman with the Thistledown Hair determines to place a second deadly curse on Lady Pole, as Faerie tradition demands. En route, the Gentleman hangs and kills Vinculus after they encounter him, with Black forced to watch. During these events, Norrell and Strange attempt a spell that would cause the natural forces of England to pay homage to John Uskglass. Not knowing his true name, they dedicate it to the "nameless slave". Instead of Uskglass, the power is vested in Black, who uses his momentary control of all of English magic to destroy the Gentleman with the Thistledown Hair. Then, leaving England forever by one of the Faerie roads, Black sheds his name and becomes the new king of the now-blossoming kingdom of Lost-Hope.

Childermass discovers Vinculus's body and notes that it is tattooed with the last work of John Uskglass. A man appears; he calls Childermass his servant, though Childermass does not recognize him, then brings Vinculus back to life and performs other feats of magic with ease. The mysterious man, heavily implied to be John Uskglass himself, then disappears, removing Childermass's and Vinculus's memories of the encounter.

As a result of the imprecision of the fairy's curse, which was placed on "the English magician", Norrell and his library are trapped along with Strange within the Impenetrable Darkness, and they cannot move more than a certain distance from each other. Upon the Gentleman with the Thistledown Hair's death, Arabella comes through the mirror in Padua, where Flora is waiting for her upon instruction of Strange. Childermass informs the Learned Society of York Magicians that their contract is void, and they can study magic again. He shows the now-restored Vinculus as proof that John Uskglass's book of magic survives, tattooed upon his body. Two months later, Strange has a conversation with Arabella, who is still living in Padua. He explains that he and Norrell are studying magic together and intend to learn to remove the Darkness they are both trapped in, but will adventure into other worlds in the meantime. Neither wishes to take Arabella to Faerie again, so Strange promises to return to her when he has dispelled the Darkness and tells her not to be a widow till then, to which she agrees.

== Characters ==
- Gilbert Norrell: England's first "practical magician" in centuries. He keeps a large collection of books of magic, which he has spent years purchasing to keep out of the hands of others, in his library at Hurtfew Abbey in Yorkshire. He is dry, pedantic, and querulous, and regards those who do not share his views on magic with deep disdain.
- Jonathan Strange: a young gentleman of Shropshire who becomes England's second magician and Mr Norrell's pupil. He marries Arabella Woodhope, the daughter of a clergyman and his friend since childhood. Unlike Norrell, he is pleasant and sociable.
- Stephen Black: Sir Walter Pole's butler and the head servant of the Pole household. He is of African descent, the son of a slave woman from Sir Walter's grandfather's estate in Jamaica. He catches the attention of the Gentleman with the Thistledown Hair.
- Emma Wintertowne (Lady Pole): Sir Walter Pole's wife; she is raised from the dead by Norrell with the help of the Gentleman with the Thistledown Hair, who keeps her under an enchantment.
- Arabella Woodhope: a young lady from a family of clergymen who marries Jonathan Strange around the time he begins to practice magic. She befriends Lady Pole, and is later enchanted and stolen away by the Gentleman with the Thistledown Hair.
- Christopher Drawlight: a vain, gossiping fop who ingratiates himself with Mr Norrell by using his position in London society to enhance the latter's fame and influence.
- Henry Lascelles: an amoral rake who works in concert with Drawlight.
- John Childermass: Mr Norrell's factotum and confidant, in opposition to Drawlight and Lascelles. He is also a practical magician, and a devoted follower of the Raven King.
- John Segundus: a new member of the York Society, who sets off the events that lead to Norrell's going to London by asking him why no more magic is done in England.
- The Gentleman with the Thistledown Hair: a powerful and malevolent fairy whom Mr Norrell summons to revive Lady Pole. He is the ruler of several kingdoms in Faerie, including Lost-Hope, where he hosts balls each night.
- Vinculus: a disreputable street magician and vagabond, the son of a Yorkshire farm servant who was hanged for stealing a valuable book from his master. He recites the Raven King's prophecy to Norrell, Strange, and others.
- John Uskglass, the Raven King: originally an English child kidnapped by fairies, he was King of Northern England from 1110 to 1434 and created English magic. By Vinculus's prophecy he describes the revival of English magic through Norrell and Strange.

== Composition and publication ==
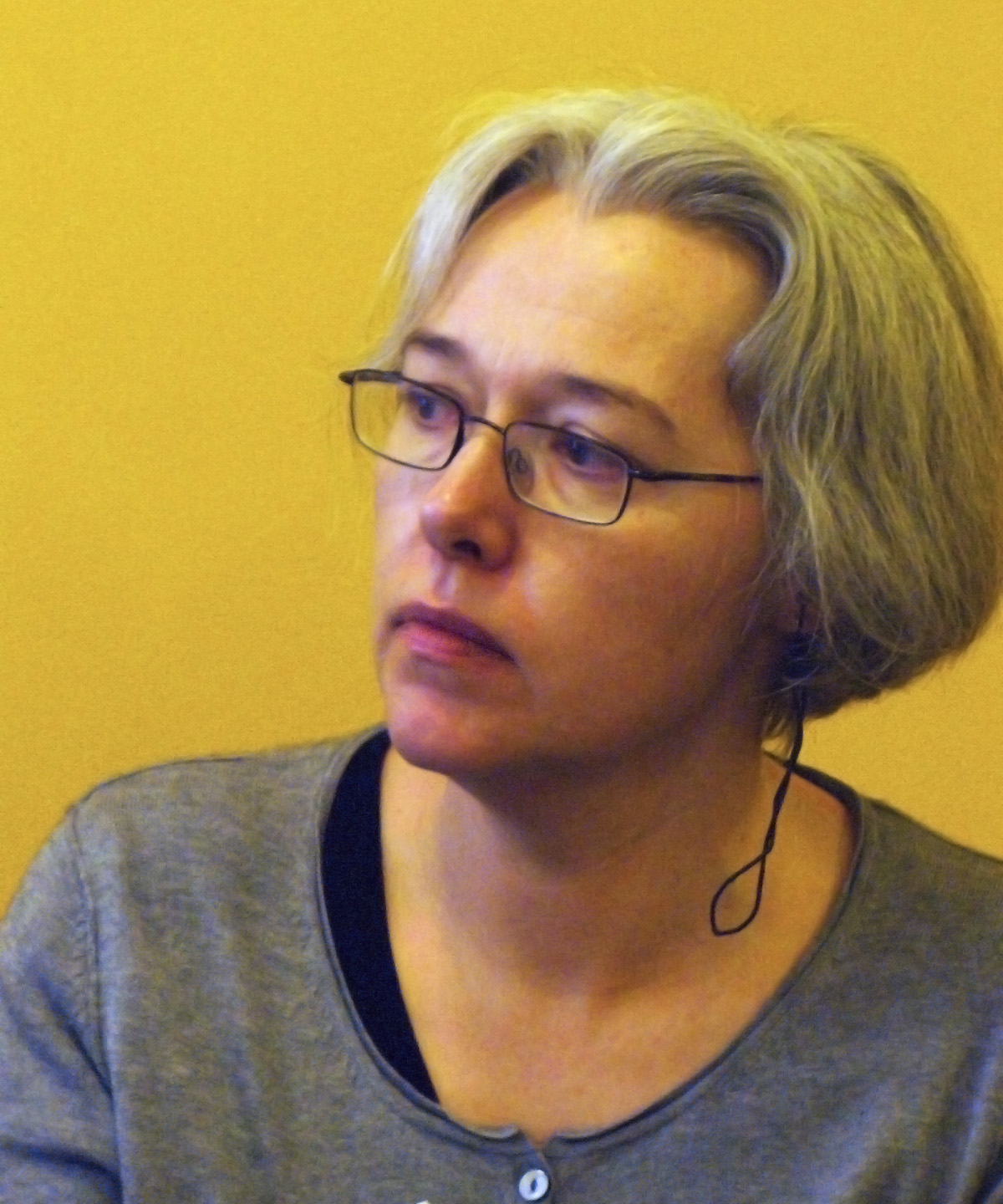
In an interview, Susanna Clarke said: "I have a fascination with magicians. I always liked them in the books I read by authors like C. S. Lewis and J. R. R. Tolkien – the Narnia Chronicles were my favourite as a child."

Clarke first developed the idea for Jonathan Strange & Mr Norrell during a year spent teaching English in Bilbao, Spain: "I had a kind of waking dream ... about a man in 18th-century clothes in a place rather like Venice, talking to some English tourists. And I felt strongly that he had some sort of magical background—he'd been dabbling in magic, and something had gone badly wrong." She had also recently re-read J. R. R. Tolkien's The Lord of the Rings and afterwards was inspired to "trying writing a novel of magic and fantasy".

After she returned from Spain in 1993, Clarke began to think seriously about writing her novel. She signed up for a five-day fantasy and science-fiction writing workshop, co-taught by writers Colin Greenland and Geoff Ryman. The students were expected to prepare a short story before attending, but Clarke only had "bundles" of material for her novel. From this she extracted "The Ladies of Grace Adieu", a story about three women secretly practising magic who are discovered by the famous Jonathan Strange. Greenland was so impressed with the story that, without Clarke's knowledge, he sent an excerpt to his friend, the fantasy writer Neil Gaiman. Gaiman later said, "It was terrifying from my point of view to read this first short story that had so much assurance ... It was like watching someone sit down to play the piano for the first time and she plays a sonata." Gaiman showed the story to his friend, science-fiction writer and editor Patrick Nielsen Hayden. Clarke learned of these events when Nielsen Hayden called and offered to publish her story in his anthology Starlight 1, which featured pieces by well-regarded science-fiction and fantasy writers. She accepted, and the book won the World Fantasy Award for best anthology in 1997.

Clarke spent the next ten years working on the novel in her spare time, while editing cookbooks full-time for Simon & Schuster in Cambridge. She also published stories in Starlight 2 and Starlight 3; according to the New York Times Magazine, her work was known and appreciated by a small group of fantasy fans and critics on the internet. She was never sure, however, if she would finish her novel or if it would be published. Clarke tried to write for three hours each day, beginning at 5:30 am, but struggled to keep this schedule. Rather than writing the novel from beginning to end, she wrote in fragments and attempted to stitch them together. Clarke, admitting that the project was for herself and not the reader, "clung to this method" because "I felt that if I went back and started at the beginning, [the novel] would lack depth, and I would just be skimming the surface of what I could do. But if I had known it was going to take me ten years, I would never have begun. I was buoyed up by thinking that I would finish it next year, or the year after next." Clarke and Greenland moved in together while she was writing the novel. Greenland did not read the novel until it was published.

Around 2001, Clarke "had begun to despair", and started looking for someone to help her finish and sell the book. Giles Gordon became her agent and sold the unfinished manuscript to Bloomsbury in early 2003, after two publishers rejected it as unmarketable. Bloomsbury were so sure the novel would be a success that they offered Clarke a £1 million advance. They printed 250,000 hardcover copies simultaneously in the United States, Britain, and Germany. Seventeen translations were begun before the first English publication was released. Jonathan Strange & Mr Norrell was first published in the United States on 8 September 2004, in the United Kingdom on 30 September, and in other countries on 4 October.

== Style ==
Reviewers disagree over the effect of Portia Rosenberg's illustrations, one praising their haunting tone and another condemning their sentimental effect as "inappropriate".

Clarke's style has frequently been described as a pastiche, particularly of nineteenth-century British writers such as Charles Dickens, Jane Austen, and George Meredith. Specifically, the novel's minor characters, including sycophants, rakes, and the Duke of Wellington, evoke Dickens' caricatures. Laura Miller, in her review for Salon, suggests that the novel is "about a certain literary voice, the eminently civilized voice of early 19th-century social comedy", exemplified by the works of Austen. The novel uses obsolete spellings—chuse for choose and shewed for showed, for example—to convey this voice as well as the free indirect speech made famous by Austen. Clarke herself notes that Austen's influence is particularly strong in the "domestic scenes, set in living rooms and drawing rooms where people mostly chat about magic" where Dickens's is prominent "any time there's more action or description". While many reviewers compare Clarke's style to that of Austen, Gregory Feeley argues in his review for The Weekly Standard that "the points of resemblance are mostly superficial". He writes that "Austen gets down to business briskly, while Clarke engages in a curious narrative strategy of continual deferral and delay." For example, Clarke mentions Jonathan Strange on the first page of the novel, but only in a footnote. He reappears in other footnotes throughout the opening but does not appear as a character in the text proper until a quarter of the way through the novel.

In Jonathan Strange & Mr Norrell, Clarke infuses her dry wit with prosaic quaintness. For example, the narrator notes: "It has been remarked (by a lady infinitely cleverer than the present author) how kindly disposed the world in general feels to young people who either die or marry. Imagine then the interest that surrounded Miss Wintertowne! No young lady ever had such advantages before: for she died upon the Tuesday, was raised to life in the early hours of Wednesday morning, and was married upon the Thursday; which some people thought too much excitement for one week." As Michel Faber explains in his review for The Guardian, "here we have all the defining features of Clarke's style simultaneously: the archly Austenesque tone, the somewhat overdone quaintness ('upon the Tuesday'), the winningly matter-of-fact use of the supernatural, and drollness to spare." Gregory Maguire notes in The New York Times that Clarke even gently ridicules the genre of the novel itself: "[A gentleman] picks up a book and begins to read ... but he is not attending to what he reads and he has got to Page 22 before he discovers it is a novel—the sort of work which above all others he most despises—and he puts it down in disgust." Elsewhere, the narrator remarks, "Dear Emma does not waste her energies upon novels like other young women." The narrator's identity has been a topic of discussion, with Clarke declaring that said narrator is female and omniscient rather than a future scholar from within the real storyline as some had suggested.

Clarke's style extends to the novel's 185 footnotes, which document a meticulous invented history of English magic. (Note: One published article, at least, references a 'fictional' work cited by Clarke in the book: Jemmer, P., De tractatu magicarum linguarum – on dealing with the magical spells (of psycho-chaotic semiotics), European Journal of Clinical Hypnosis, 4 (7) 22–33, (2007).) At times, the footnotes dominate entire pages of the novel. Michael Dirda, in his review for The Washington Post, describes these notes as "dazzling feats of imaginative scholarship", in which the anonymous narrator "provides elaborate mini-essays, relating anecdotes from the lives of semi-legendary magicians, describing strange books and their contents, speculating upon the early years and later fate of the Raven King". This extensive extra-textual apparatus is reminiscent of postmodernist works, such as David Foster Wallace's Infinite Jest (1996) and Thomas Pynchon's Mason & Dixon (1997), particularly as Clarke's notes humorously refer to previous notes in the novel. Clarke did not expect her publisher to accept the footnotes.

Feeley explains that Romantic poet John Keats's "vision of enchantment and devastation following upon any dealings with faeries" informs the novel, as the passing reference to the "cold hillside" makes clear. (Note: The reference is to Keats's poem "La Belle Dame sans Merci". See John Keats, "La Belle Dame sans Merci". www.bartleby.com. Retrieved 13 January 2009.) The magic in Jonathan Strange & Mr Norrell has been described as "wintry and sinister" and "a melancholy, macabre thing". There are "flocks of black birds, a forest that grows up in the canals of Venice, a countryside of bleak moors that can only be entered through mirrors, a phantom bell that makes people think of everything they have ever lost, a midnight darkness that follows an accursed man everywhere he goes". The setting reflects this tone, as "dark, fog, mist and wet give the book much of its creepy, northern atmosphere". According to Nisi Shawl in her review for The Seattle Times, the illustrations reinforce this tenor: "Shadows fill the illustrations by Portia Rosenberg, as apt as Edward Gorey's for Dickens' Bleak House." Author John Clute disagrees, arguing that they are "astonishingly inappropriate" to the tone of the novel. Noting that Clarke refers to important nineteenth-century illustrators George Cruikshank and Thomas Rowlandson, (Note: The original article says "George Rowlandson", but as there is no nineteenth-century illustrator of that name, it is likely that the author meant the famous Thomas Rowlandson.) whose works are "line-dominated, intricate, scabrous, cartoon-like, savage and funny", he is disappointed with the "soft and wooden" illustrations provided by Rosenberg.

== Genre ==
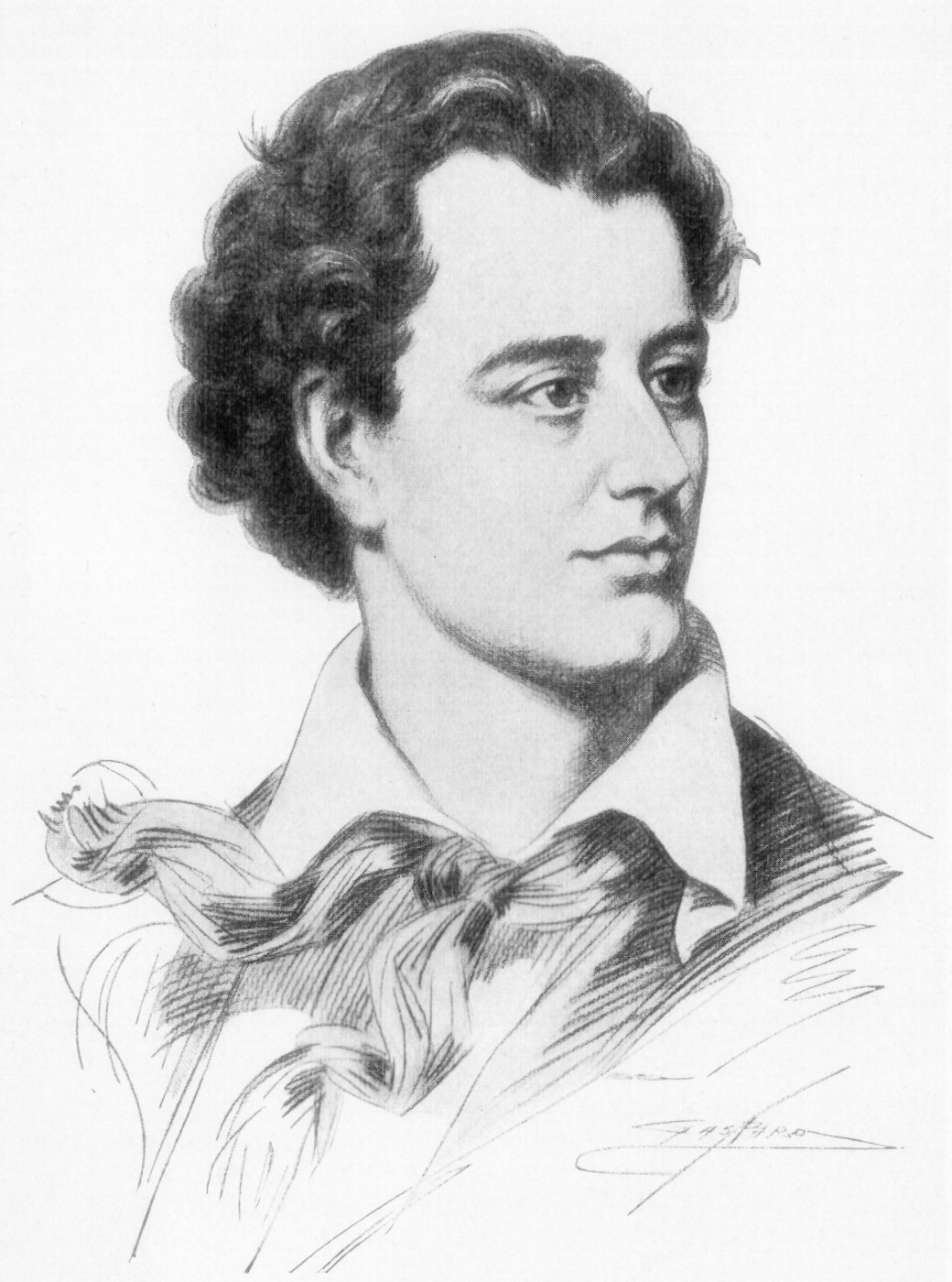
In the novel, Lord Byron (pictured) models the lead of Manfred after Jonathan Strange.

Reviewers variously describe Jonathan Strange & Mr Norrell as a fantasy novel, an alternative history, a historical fiction, or as a combination of these styles. Clarke herself says, "I think the novel is viewed as something new ... blending together a few genres—such as fantasy and adventure and pastiche historical—plus there's the whole thing about slightly knowing footnotes commenting on the story." She explains in an interview that she was particularly influenced by the historical fiction of Rosemary Sutcliff as well as the fantasies of Ursula K. Le Guin and Alan Garner, and that she loves the works of Austen.

In his review for The Boston Globe, John Freeman observes that Clarke's fantasy, like that of Franz Kafka and Neil Gaiman, is imbued with realism. He argues that the footnotes in particular lend an air of credibility to the narrative: for example, they describe a fictional biography of Jonathan Strange and list where particular paintings in Norrell's house are located. In an interview, Clarke describes how she creates this realist fantasy: "One way of grounding the magic is by putting in lots of stuff about street lamps, carriages and how difficult it is to get good servants." To create this effect, the novel includes many references to real early-nineteenth century people and things, such as: artists Francisco Goya, Cruikshank, and Rowlandson; writers Frances Burney, William Beckford, "Monk" Lewis, Lord Byron, and Ann Radcliffe; Maria Edgeworth's Belinda and Austen's Emma; publisher John Murray; politicians Lord Castlereagh and George Canning; The Gentleman's Magazine and The Edinburgh Review; Chippendale and Wedgwood furnishings; and the madness of King George III. Clarke has said that she hopes the magic is as realistic as that in Le Guin's Earthsea trilogy. This realism has led other reviewers, such as Polly Shulman, to argue that Clarke's book is more of an historical fiction, akin to the works of Patrick O'Brian. As she explains, "Both Clarke's and O'Brian's stories are about a complicated relationship between two men bound together by their profession; both are set during the Napoleonic wars; and they share a dry, melancholy wit and unconventional narrative shape." Shulman sees fantasy and historical fiction as similar because both must follow rigid rules or risk a breakdown of the narrative.

As well as literary styles, Clarke pastiches many Romantic literary genres: the comedy of manners, the Gothic tale, the silver-fork novel, the military adventure, the Byronic hero, and the historical romance of Walter Scott. In fact, Clarke's novel maps the literary history of the early nineteenth century: the novel begins with the style and genres of Regency England, an "Austenian world of light, bright, sparkling dialogue and well-mannered gentility", and gradually transforms into a dark, Byronic tale. Clarke combines these Romantic genres with modern ones, such as the fantasy novel, drawing on the works of J. R. R. Tolkien, Philip Pullman, T. H. White, and C. S. Lewis. As Maguire notes, Clarke includes rings of power and books of spells that originate in these authors' works. In contrast, Sacha Zimmerman suggests in The New Republic that while Tolkien's world is "entirely new", Clarke's world is more engaging because it is eerily close to the reader's. Although many reviewers compare Jonathan Strange & Mr Norrell to the Harry Potter series, Annie Linskey contends in The Baltimore Sun that "the allusion is misleading": unlike J. K. Rowling's novels, Clarke's is morally ambiguous, with its complex plot and dark characters.

== Themes ==
=== Friendship ===
Reviewers focus most frequently on the dynamic between Norrell and Strange, arguing that the novel is about their relationship. In her review for the Times Literary Supplement, Roz Kaveney writes that the two illustrate Harold Bloom's notion of the "anxiety of influence" in addition to romantic friendship. The two are a "study in contrasts", with Norrell "exceptionally learned but shy and fussy" while Strange is "charming, young, fashionable and romantic". As one reviewer remarks, "Clarke could have called the book Sense and Sensibility if the title weren't already taken."

=== Reason and madness ===
The novel is not about the fight between good and evil but rather the differences between madness and reason—and it is the fairy world that is connected to madness (mad people can see fairies, for example). Lady Pole, who is taken away into the fairyland of Lost-Hope every night, appears insane to those around her. She is hidden away, like the character type examined by Sandra Gilbert and Susan Gubar in their seminal book The Madwoman in the Attic (1979). Developing a "divided consciousness", she is passive and quiet at home, but at the same time is vengeful and murderous in the fairy land.

=== Englishness ===
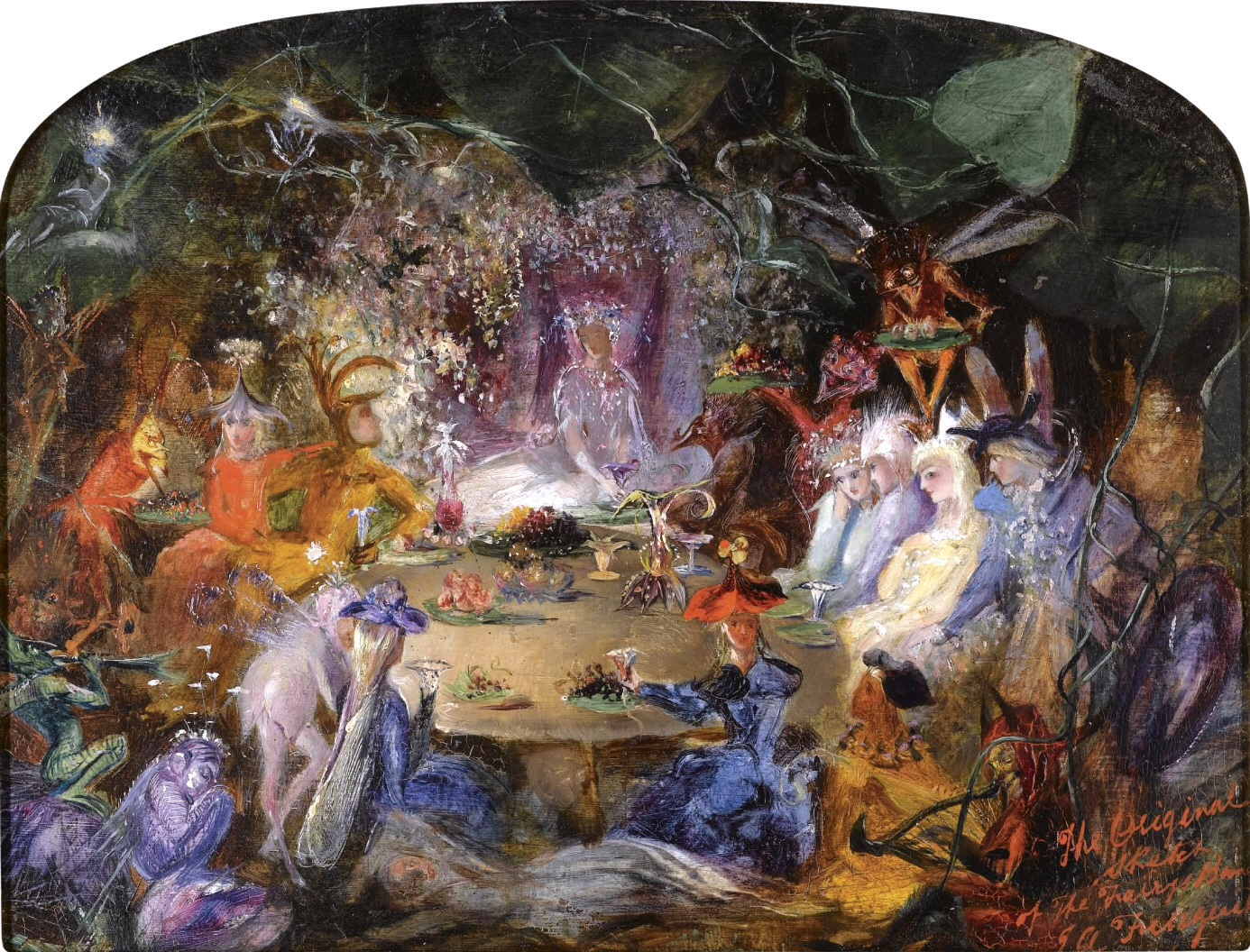
Fairies' Banquet (1859) by John Anster Fitzgerald

Clarke's book is identified as distinctively English not only because of its style but also because of its themes of "vigorous common sense", "firm ethical fiber", "serene reason and self-confidence", which are drawn from its Augustan literary roots. The "muddy, bloody, instinctual spirit of the fairies" is equally a part of its Englishness, along with "arrogance, provincialism and class prejudice". The fairy tradition that Clarke draws on is particularly English; she alludes to tales from children's literature and others which date back to the medieval period. As Feeley notes, "The idea of fairies forming a hidden supernatural aristocracy certainly predates Spenser and Shakespeare, and seems to distinguish the English tales of wee folk from those of Scotland and Ireland." In these medieval English stories, the fairies are depicted as "capricious, inconsistent in their attitude toward humankind, [and] finally unknowable", characteristics which Clarke integrates into her own fairies. Clarke notes in an interview that she drew the idea of unpredictable, amoral fairies from the works of Neil Gaiman.

In an interview with Locus, Clarke explains why and how she integrated the theme of "Englishness" into Jonathan Strange: "I wanted to explore my ideas of the fantastic, as well as my ideas of England and my attachment to English landscape. ... Sometimes it feels to me as though we don't have a fable of England, of Britain, something strong and idealized and romantic. I was picking up on things like Chesterton and Conan Doyle, and the sense (which is also in Jane Austen) of what it was to be an English gentleman at the time when England was a very confident place". In particular, "it's the sort of Englishness which is stuffy but fundamentally benevolent, and fundamentally very responsible about the rest of the world", which connects Conan Doyle's Sherlock Holmes to Clarke's Jonathan Strange.

=== Historical otherness ===
Using techniques of the genre of alternative history, Clarke creates events and characters that would have been out of place in the early nineteenth century. She also explores the "silencing" of under-represented groups: women, people of colour, and poor whites. Both Strange and Norrell suppress the voices of these groups in their rise to power. Mr Norrell, for example, attempts to buy up all the books of magic in England to keep anyone else from acquiring their knowledge. He also barters away half of Emma Wintertowne's (Lady Pole's) life for political influence, a deal about which, due to an enchantment, she cannot speak coherently.

Clarke explores the limits of "English" magic through the characters of Stephen Black and Vinculus. As Clarke explains, "If you put a fairy next to a person who is also outside English society ... suddenly the fact that there is this alien race seems more believable, because you've got another alien and the two of them can talk about the English in this very natural way." The gentleman with the thistle-down hair idealizes Stephen as a noble savage and enslaves him by taking him to the Lost-Hope—like Lady Pole, Stephen is silenced. Both "suffer under a silencing spell that mimics gaps in the historical record". Furthermore, the gentleman's desire to acquire Stephen for his dancing hall is reminiscent of the objectification of black slaves in European society. Stephen vows to eternally hate all white men after he hears the circumstances of the death of his enslaved mother, but when the thistle-down haired gentleman kills the white Vinculus in front of Stephen, he weeps. Both Strange and Norrell see the essence of Englishness in the Raven King, a character who was raised by fairies and could not speak English. As Elizabeth Hoiem explains, "The most English of all Englishmen, then, is both king and slave, in many ways indistinguishable from Stephen Black. This paradox is what ultimately resolves the plot. When Strange and Norrell summon 'the nameless slave', the Raven King's powerful alliances with nature are transferred to Stephen Black, allowing Stephen to kill the Gentleman and free himself from slavery." In the end, it is Strange and Norrell who are trapped in everlasting darkness while the silenced women, people of colour, and poor whites defeat the antagonist.

== Reception ==
To promote Jonathan Strange & Mr Norrell, Bloomsbury—who also published the Harry Potter series—launched what The Observer called "one of the biggest marketing campaigns in publishing history". Their campaign included plans for newspaper serialisations, book deliveries by horse and carriage, and the placement of "themed teasers", such as period stationery and mock newspapers, in United States coffeeshops. 7,500 advance readers' copies were sent out, a limited number wrapped in paper and sealed with wax. These sold for more than US$100 each on eBay in England in the weeks leading up to publication. By 2005, collectors were paying hundreds of pounds for signed copies of a limited edition of the novel.

The book made its debut at No. 9 on the New York Times Best Seller list, rising to No. 3 two weeks later. It remained on the list for eleven weeks. Four weeks after the book's initial publication, it was in Amazon's top ten. Clarke went on a 20-city tour to promote the novel, after its near-simultaneous publication in 20 countries. Endorsements from independent booksellers helped the book sell out its first printing; by the end of September 2004, it had gone through eight printings.

The novel met with "a crackle of favorable reviews in major papers".

The New Republic hailed it as "an exceptional work", both "thoughtful and irrepressibly imaginative". The Houston Chronicle described Clarke as "a superb character writer", and the Denver Post called her a "superb storyteller". The reviews praised Clarke's "deft" handling of the pastiche of styles, but many criticised the novel's pace, The Guardian complaining that "the plot creaks frightfully in many places and the pace dawdles". In his review for Science Fiction Weekly, Clute suggested that "almost every scene in the first 300 pages should have been carefully and delicately trimmed" (emphasis in original) since they do little to advance the story. He argued that, at times, Clarke's Austenesque tone gets in the way of plot development. On the other hand, The Baltimore Sun found the novel "a quick read". Complaining that the book leaves the reader "longing for just a bit more lyricism and poetry", The Washington Post reviewer noted, with others, that "sex plays virtually no role in the story ... [and] one looks in vain for the corruption of the innocent". The New Statesman reviewer, Amanda Craig, praised the novel as "a tale of magic such as might have been written by the young Jane Austen—or, perhaps, by the young Mrs Radcliffe, whose Gothic imagination and exuberant delicacy of style set the key." However, she also criticised the book: "As fantasy, it is deplorable, given that it fails to embrace the essentially anarchic nature of such tales. What is so wonderful about magicians, wizards and all witches other than Morgan le Fay is not just their magical powers, but that they possess these in spite of being low-born. Far from caring about being gentlemen, wizards are the ultimate expression of rank's irrelevance to talent". However, reviewers were not in universal agreement on any of these points. Maguire wrote in The New York Times:

What keeps this densely realised confection aloft is that very quality of reverence to the writers of the past. The chief character in Jonathan Strange and Mr. Norrell isn't, in fact, either of the magicians: it's the library that they both adore, the books they consult and write and, in a sense, become. Clarke's giddiness comes from finding a way at once to enter the company of her literary heroes, to pay them homage and to add to the literature.

While promoting the novel, Neil Gaiman said that it was "unquestionably the finest English novel of the fantastic written in the last 70 years", a statement which has been read hyperbolically by Clute. However, Clute explains what Gaiman meant was that Jonathan Strange is "the finest English novel of the fantastic since Hope Mirrlees's great Lud-in-the-Mist (1926), which is almost certainly the finest English fantasy about the relationship between England and the fantastic yet published". Gaiman himself concurred with this view, stating that he had had Lud-in-the-Mist in mind when making his promotion and that, when asked about Tolkien's place in English fantasy, "I would explain that I did not, and do not, think of The Lord of the Rings as English fantasy but as high fantasy". Clute writes that "a more cautious claim" would be: "if Susanna Clarke finishes the story she has hardly begun in Strange ... she may well have then written the finest English novel of the fantastic about the myth of England and the myth of the fantastic and the marriage of the two ever published, bar none of the above, including Mirrlees."

== Awards and nominations ==
Year	Award	Result	Ref.
2004	Guardian First Book Award	Shortlisted	
2004	Man Booker Prize	Longlisted	
2004	Whitbread First Novel Award	Shortlisted	
2004	Time's Best Novel of the Year	Won	
2005	British Book Awards Literary Fiction Award	Shortlisted	
2005	British Book Awards Newcomer of the Year Award	Won	
2005	Hugo Award for Best Novel	Won	
2005	Locus Award for Best First Novel	Won	
2005	Mythopoeic Award for Adult Literature	Won	
2005	Nebula Award for Best Novel	Shortlisted	
2005	World Fantasy Award for Best Novel	Won	

== Adaptations and sequel ==
=== Film ===
On 15 October 2004, New Line Cinema announced that it had bought a three-year option on the film rights to Jonathan Strange & Mr Norrell. Clarke received an undisclosed "seven-figure sum", making the deal "one of the biggest acquisitions of film rights for a book in recent years". New Line chose Christopher Hampton, whose adaptation of Dangerous Liaisons won an Academy Award, to write it; New Line executives Mark Ordesky and Ileen Maisel were overseeing the production. On 7 November 2005, The Daily Telegraph reported that Hampton had finished the first draft: "As you can imagine, it took a fair amount of time to work out some way to encapsulate that enormous book in a film of sensible length ... [b]ut it was lots of fun—and very unlike anything I have ever done before." At that time, no director or cast had yet been chosen. As of June 2006, Hampton was still working on the screenplay. Julian Fellowes then took over writing duties before the collapse of New Line Cinema.

=== Television ===
Pre-production of a seven-part adaptation of the book began in April 2013, with filming later in the year, including locations in England, primarily in Yorkshire, as well as in Canada and Croatia.

The miniseries began broadcast on BBC One on Sunday 17 May 2015. The book was adapted by Peter Harness, directed by Toby Haynes, starring Bertie Carvel and Eddie Marsan as the titular magicians, and was produced by Cuba Pictures and Feel Films.

=== Audio book ===
The 32-hour audio book of Jonathan Strange & Mr Norrell was released by Audio Renaissance in 2004. According to a review in The Boston Globe, reader Simon Prebble "navigates this production with much assuredness and an array of accents. ... Prebble's full voice is altered to a delicate softness for young ladies of a certain breeding, or tightened to convey the snarkiness often heard in the costive Norrell." Prebble interrupts the main text to read the footnotes, announcing them with the word footnote. According to the AudioFile review, the "narrative flow suffers" because of these interruptions and the reviewer recommends listening "with text in hand". Each note is on its own track, so listeners have the option of skipping them without missing text from the main narrative. When doing public readings, Clarke herself skips the notes.

=== Sequel ===
In 2004, Clarke mentioned that she was working on a book that begins a few years after Jonathan Strange & Mr Norrell ends, intended to centre on characters such as Childermass and Vinculus who, as Clarke says, are "a bit lower down the social scale". She commented in 2005 and 2007 that progress on the book had been slowed by her ill health. In 2006 it was reported that she suffered from chronic fatigue syndrome, although she has since received a wide assortment of diagnoses. In promotional interviews for her second novel, Piranesi, she commented that her illness would have made the effort required to research and write another book of the same scope "insurmountable" even when partially recovered, and that she had instead devoted her time to an older, "much more feasible" idea, which became Piranesi. The sequel, she said, is "a long way off":

I think it may be a feature with chronic fatigue that you become incapable of making decisions. I found it impossible to decide between one version of a sentence and another version, but also between having the plot go in this direction and having it go in that direction. Everything became like uncontained bushes, shooting out in all directions. That's the state that the sequel to Jonathan Strange is in. It's almost like a forest now.
