= The Legend of Krishna =

1975 fantasy novel by Nigel Frith

- First edition cover
- Author: Nigel Frith
- Language: English
- Publication date: 1975

The Legend of Krishna is a novel written by Nigel Frith and published in 1975 by Sheldon Press. It was published again in 1985 by Unwin under the title Krishna.

== Plot summary ==
Krishna is a novel in which the story of Krishna is retold.

== Reception ==
Colin Greenland reviewed Krishna for Imagine magazine, and stated that "Start practising those finger-cymbals now."

== Reviews ==
- Review by Brian Stableford (1985) in Fantasy Review, June 1985
- Review by Chris Bailey (1985) in Paperback Inferno, #55
