= The Ladies of Grace Adieu and Other Stories =

2006 short story collection by Susanna Clarke

- Author: Susanna Clarke
- Illustrator: Charles Vess
- Cover artist: Petra Borner
- Publisher: Bloomsbury USA
- Publication date: October 17, 2006
- Publication place: United States
- Pages: 235
- ISBN: 978-1596912519 (hardcover US 1st ed)
- OCLC: 68623988
- Dewey Decimal: 823/.92
- LC Class: PR6103.L375 L33 2006

The Ladies of Grace Adieu and Other Stories, published in October 2006 by Bloomsbury, is a collection of eight short stories by British writer Susanna Clarke, illustrated by Charles Vess. The stories, which are sophisticated fairy tales, focus on the power of women and are set in the same alternative history as Clarke's debut novel Jonathan Strange & Mr Norrell (2004), in which magic has returned to England. The stories are written in a pastiche of 18th- and 19th-century styles and their tone is macabre as well as satirical. The volume was generally well received, though some critics compared it unfavorably to Jonathan Strange.

== Contents and themes ==
The collection, presented as the work of several different writers, contains an introduction and eight fairy tales, seven of which had been previously anthologized. The volume's focus on "female mastery of the dark arts" is reflected in the ladies of Grace Adieu's magical abilities and the prominent role needlework plays in saving the Duke of Wellington and Mary, Queen of Scots. The collection is a "sly, frequently comical, feminist revision" of Jonathan Strange & Mr Norrell. In tone, the stories are similar to the clear yet impassive narrator's voice of Jonathan Strange.

"Introduction" by Professor James Sutherland, Director of Sidhe Studies, University of Aberdeen. Written in the same postmodern style as Jonathan Strange, the "introduction" to the collection by fictional Professor Sutherland speculates on the "sources" for the stories. Clarke begins by describing his "two very modest aims": "The first is to throw some sort of light on the development of magic in the British Isles at different periods; the second is to introduce the reader to some of the ways in which Faerie can impinge upon our own quotidian world, in other words to create a sort of primer to Faerie and fairies."

"The Ladies of Grace Adieu" was Clarke's first published story. While working on Jonathan Strange & Mr Norrell, she enrolled in a writing course co-taught by Colin Greenland and Geoff Ryman, which required each student to submit a completed short story before the course began. Clarke culled "The Ladies of Grace Adieu" from her incipient novel. Greenland was so impressed with the story that, without Clarke's knowledge, he sent an excerpt to his friend, the fantasy writer Neil Gaiman. Gaiman later said, "It was terrifying from my point of view to read this first short story that had so much assurance ... It was like watching someone sit down to play the piano for the first time and she plays a sonata." Gaiman showed the story to his friend, science-fiction writer and editor Patrick Nielsen Hayden. Clarke learned of these events when Hayden called and offered to publish her story in his anthology Starlight 1 (1996), which featured pieces by well-regarded science-fiction and fantasy writers. She accepted and the book won the World Fantasy Award for best anthology in 1997.

The story is set in early 19th-century Gloucestershire and concerns the friendship of three young women, Cassandra Parbringer, Miss Tobias, and Mrs. Fields. Though the events of the story do not actually appear in Jonathan Strange & Mr Norrell, they are referenced in a footnote in Chapter 43. Clarke has said:

For a long time it was my hope that these three ladies should eventually find a place in [Jonathan Strange] ... I decided there was no place for them ... I deliberately kept women to the domestic sphere in the interests of authenticity ... it was important that real and alternate history appeared to have converged. This meant that I needed to write the women and the servants, as far as possible, as they would have been written in a 19th-century novel.

Reviewers of the short story collection highlighted this tale, one calling it "the most striking story" of the volume and "a staunchly feminist take on power relations". Victoria Hoyle in Strange Horizons writes in particular that "there is something incredibly precise, clean, and cold about Clarke's portrayal of 'women's magic' in this story (and throughout the collection)—it is urgent and desperate, but it is also natural and in the course of things."

"On Lickerish Hill" is a retelling of the Rumplestiltskin tale. Narrated by the 17th-century Suffolk bride Miranda Sowreston, it tells of how she resorts to magic to spin enough flax to satisfy her husband's demands. As Hoyle explains, in order to avoid "imprisonment, murder, dismemberment, or sexual slavery", Miranda must defeat not only her captor but also the man attempting to save her. The story satirizes the antiquarian John Aubrey and his ilk, as Aubrey's advice to Miranda and her husband turns out to be largely worthless. Written in the form of an old diary, the text includes archaic spellings; for example, Miranda's assistant is described as "[a] small black thinge. Hairie. Legges like jug-handles. Face – not a bitt handsome."

"Mrs Mabb" is a story about a 19th-century woman, Venetia Moore, whose fiancé, Captain Fox, leaves her for the mysterious Mrs. Mabb (who turns out to be Queen Mab). Devastated, Venetia attempts to get him back. In the process, she becomes enchanted and, for example, ends up wandering around a cemetery with bleeding bare feet. The community assumes she is insane. However, as Lucy Atkins in The Times notes, who calls this "most memorable" story of the collection, "for her this is not madness, it is persistence." As Hoyle argues, in this story Clarke toys with the stereotypes of women as both hysterical and intuitive.

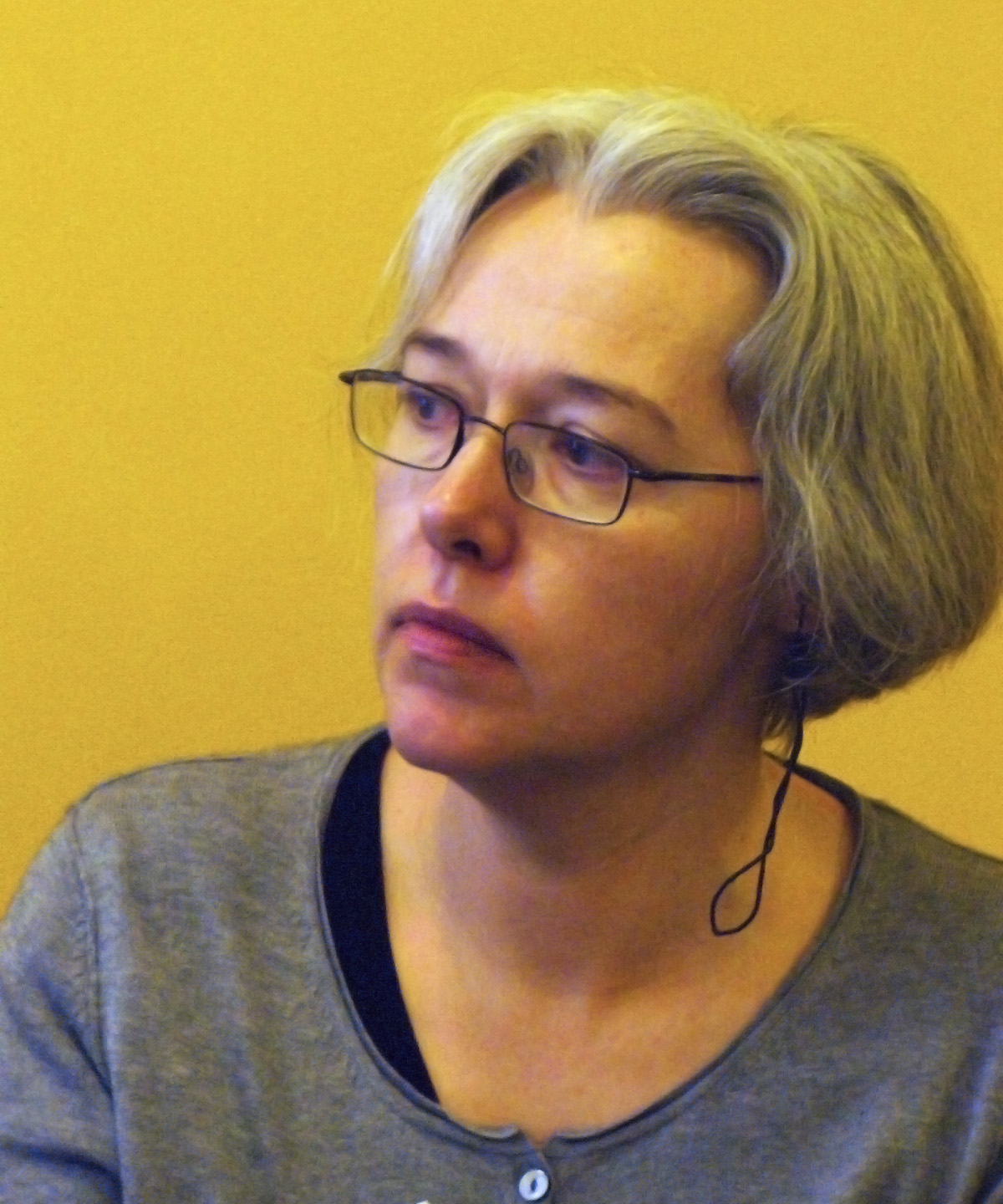
Susanna Clarke enjoyed reading the works of Sir Arthur Conan Doyle, Charles Dickens, and Jane Austen as a child.

"The Duke of Wellington Misplaces His Horse" is set in the village of Wall, which is part of Gaiman's novel Stardust (also illustrated by Vess). In this story, the Duke enters Faerie, where he finds a Lady of Shalott figure embroidering a tapestry of what appears to be his future. Frustrated by the seeming inevitability of his fate, he unweaves her tapestry and resews his own future to match his desires. Hoyle calls this story "trite" and "clichéd", however.

"Mr Simonelli, or the Fairy Widower" is presented as an extract from Allessandro Simonelli's journal and describes his conflict with an amoral Faerie aristocrat. It is presented, in the words of Tim Martin of The Independent, in "the creaking diary form of Bram Stoker". Simonelli must propose to each of the five Gathercole sisters, who resemble the Bennetts from Jane Austen's Pride and Prejudice, in order to save them from John Hollyshoes. The tale is related by:

Simonelli, the unreliable and otherwise morally deplorable narrator ... [and] the bastard child of an elusive stranger who might have been Italian, but was actually a fairy. In this story Clarke plays (as she did in her novel) with analogies between racial otherness and the uncanny, while simultaneously presenting us with a narrative of subtly layered ironies set in a vividly evoked landscape, part Peak District, part fantasy of Burkean sublimity.

"Tom Brightwind, or How the Fairy Bridge was Built at Thoresby" is set during the 18th century and tells the story of a Jewish-Venetian doctor, David Montefiore, and his fairy friend, Tom Brightwind. The fictional Professor Sutherland remarks in a note to the story that it "suffers from all the usual defects of second-rate early-19th-century writing". In his review of the collection, Steven H. Silver writes that "the story is diverting, made even more interesting by the copious asides explaining fairy culture."

"Antickes and Frets" is a fictionalized version of the detention of Mary, Queen of Scots, by Bess of Hardwick and George Talbot, 6th Earl of Shrewsbury. After discovering that Bess murdered her husband using magic, Mary attempts to learn her secret knowledge to assist in her own political plots. The story was first published in The New York Times immediately after the release of Jonathan Strange.

"John Uskglass and the Cumbrian Charcoal Burner" is a "ribald piece of pseudo-folklore" about John Uskglass, who was a central figure in Jonathan Strange. It is "an anarchic medieval triumph-of-the-peasantry tale" in which the "pagan power of faerie [is] outwitted by the Christian saints". Hoyle notes that this story, the only one not previously published, was used to sell the volume, but that it is not as "sinister" as the others and lacks "Clarke's usual imaginative feeling".

== Cover art ==
Cover art was drawn by Petra Borner. Reviewers praised the hardcover edition of Grace Adieu, describing its design and careful construction as similar to 19th-century printing.

== Illustrations ==
Charles Vess's illustration for "The Duke of Wellington Misplaces his Horse".

Vess's black-and-white line drawings are "reminiscent of the great Arthur Rackham, harking back to the early 20th-century golden age of children's book illustrations". Mary Ann Gwinn praises them in The Seattle Times, describing them as "delightful" and inspired by Art Deco and Edward Gorey. Lucy Hughes-Hallett, however, argues that the volume is "insistently and inappropriately illustrated". Agreeing that the images are indebted to Rackham, she contends that they are "anachronistic" and a "kind of mimsy-whimsy".

Reviewers praised the design and construction of the book itself, praising its similarity to products of late 19th-century publishing. Hoyle notes that the hardback was "embossed rather than jacketed, shaded in a discreet grey and black palette with flashes of a lively petunia pink; inside the paper is thick and creamy, the font is bold and each story has its own title page, provided by Vess."

== Reception ==
Published in October 2006.

Karen Luscombe of The Globe and Mail called the collection "mesmerizing". She praised the tone of the collection, describing it as "delicious[ly] macabre ... exquisitely balanced by an equally delectable sense of satire". For example, a magician tries to find a spell "for turning Members of Parliament into useful members of society" but cannot find one. However, Graham Joyce of The Washington Post complained that while Jonathan Strange "was celebrated for its literary touch and its filigree attention to detail", The Ladies of Grace Adieu lacks of the "density" of the novel and "without the scope and the escapist hermetical seal of Strange & Norrell, the stories become suddenly exposed as light-as-a-feather whimsies". He further commented on the asexuality of the stories and criticized the characters as "emotionally disengaged", arguing that "there is a kind of darkness, but there is no shadow." In her review in Strange Horizons, Hoyle agreed with Joyce's general review, writing "the stories ... are consistently subtle and enchanting, and as charismatic as any reader could wish, but, while the collection has the panache of the novel, it lacks its glorious self-possession." In the end, she said that:

we would be best to read these stories as a series of extended footnotes, the kind for which Clarke is famous. They continue to play on the riffs—of Faerie, power, and gender—that were established in her novel, but really, they're something else, a sideline in storytelling and representative of Clarke's much wider interests as a writer of English mythology and folklore.

The story Mrs Mabb was dramatised on BBC Radio 4 in 2008, starring Bertie Carvel as Captain Fox. He went on to play Jonathan Strange in the 2015 BBC TV dramatisation of Clarke's novel Jonathan Strange and Mr Norrell.

== Audio book ==
Audio Renaissance released an audio book read by Simon Prebble and Davina Porter. In her review of the recording in The Boston Globe, Rochelle O'Gorman writes that:

narrator Davina Porter has one of those pretty, well-trained British voices that one could listen to forever. She does a remarkable job of changing her voice and accent. She can manage deep and growly in one sentence and then sound delicate and extremely feminine in the next. Almost her match is Simon Prebble, who is also adept at interpreting various characters, but his narration lacks the brio Porter brings.
