= The Entropy Exhibition =

Non-fiction work by Colin Greenland

- Author: Colin Greenland
- Publication date: 1983
- ISBN: 0710093101

The Entropy Exhibition: Michael Moorcock and the British 'New Wave' in Science Fiction is a book by Colin Greenland published in 1983.

== Contents ==
The Entropy Exhibition: Michael Moorcock and the British 'New Wave' in Science Fiction is a book that provides a critical study of New Worlds magazine during the period when Michael Moorcock was its editor.

== Reception ==
Dave Pringle reviewed The Entropy Exhibition: Michael Moorcock and the British 'New Wave' in Science Fiction for Imagine magazine, and stated that "The author, still in his 20s, is obviously too young to have read NW in the 60s, but he has imagined the excitement of the period remarkably well. An important book, on an important subject."

== Reviews ==
- Review by Dan Chow (1983) in Locus, #271 August 1983
- Review by John Clute (1983) in Interzone, #5 Autumn 1983
- Review by Patrick Parrinder (1983) in Foundation, #29 November 1983
- Review by Paul Brazier (1984) in Vector 120
