= Piranesi (novel) =

2020 fantasy novel by Susanna Clarke

- Cover of first UK edition
- Author: Susanna Clarke
- Audio read by: Chiwetel Ejiofor
- Language: English
- Publisher: Bloomsbury Publishing
- Publication date: 15 September 2020
- Publication place: London
- Media type: Print (hardback), e-book, audio
- Pages: 272
- Awards: Women's Prize for Fiction (2021)
- ISBN: 978-1-5266-2242-6 (hardback)
- OCLC: 1157346980
- Dewey Decimal: 823/.92
- LC Class: PR6103.L375 P57 2020

Piranesi is a speculative fiction novel by English author Susanna Clarke, published by Bloomsbury Publishing in 2020. It is Clarke's second novel, following her debut Jonathan Strange & Mr Norrell (2004), published sixteen years earlier. The novel is written as a journal from within a seemingly infinite, world-encompassing megastructure called the House.

Piranesi received highly positive reviews; it won the 2021 Women's Prize for Fiction and was nominated for the Hugo Award for Best Novel.

== Plot ==
The protagonist, identified only by his nickname of Piranesi, lives in a place called the House, a world composed of infinite halls and vestibules lined with statues, no two of which are alike. The upper levels of the House are filled with clouds, and the lower levels with an ocean, which occasionally surges into the middle level following tidal patterns that Piranesi meticulously tracks. He records every day in his journals, the text of which makes up the novel. Piranesi identifies himself as a scientist, postulating the House is alive and deific and stating he has evidence for the existence of only fifteen people in the world, all but two of whom are long-dead skeletons.

Twice a week, Piranesi meets with the Other, a well-dressed man who enlists his help to search for a "Great and Secret Knowledge" hidden somewhere in the House. The Other occasionally brings Piranesi supplies that seem to originate from outside the House, such as shoes, electric torches, and multivitamins. When Piranesi suggests that they abandon the quest for the Great and Secret Knowledge, the Other says they have had this conversation before, and warns Piranesi that the House slowly erodes one's memories and personality.

The Other warns Piranesi that a sixteenth person, whom both call "16", may enter the House to do him harm, and that he must not approach 16 under any circumstances or he will lose his sanity. Piranesi meets an elderly stranger he calls the Prophet, who identifies the Other as Ketterley, a rival who stole his ideas about the Knowledge. The Prophet claims that the House is a "distributary world", formed by ideas flowing out of another world. He declares he will lead 16 to the House in order to hurt Ketterley.

While indexing his journals, Piranesi discovers references to entries he does not remember writing, which include terms mentioned by the Prophet. The entries tell the story of an occultist from the modern world named Laurence Arne-Sayles who posited that other worlds existed and could be accessed; Ketterley was one of his students. Arne-Sayles fostered a cult-like mentality among his followers and was eventually imprisoned for kidnapping a man named James Ritter. Ritter later described being held captive in a place resembling the House.

Piranesi discovers that 16 has entered the House, and leaves a message. Piranesi avoids reading 16's reply, but interactions with the Other reveal that she is a woman named Raphael. After learning that a rare confluence of tides will soon flood the middle level of the House, Piranesi leaves a warning for 16, and discovers a message from her asking "Are you Matthew Rose Sorensen?" Reading the name awakes Piranesi's memories of the modern world.

Further research in Piranesi's journals reveals that someone has destroyed all entries relating to Ketterley. Piranesi pieces the destroyed pages back together from scraps he finds in gull nests, and learns the true story of how he came to the House: he was Matthew Rose Sorensen, a journalist writing a book about Arne-Sayles, revealed to be Piranesi's Prophet. When Rose Sorensen went to interview Ketterley, Ketterley used a rite to imprison him in the House, where he slowly lost his memory and constructed a new identity which Ketterley mockingly named Piranesi.

On the day of the flood, Piranesi confronts Ketterley with his reclaimed memories just as Raphael returns to find him. Ketterley tries to kill them both, but drowns in the floodwaters. After the water recedes, Raphael explains that she is a British police detective investigating disappearances related to Arne-Sayles, who revealed to her the rite necessary to enter the House out of spite for Ketterley. She asks Piranesi to return to his home world, where his family has been mourning his disappearance for all six years he has spent in the House. After long deliberation, he elects to leave.

In an epilogue, the narrator has adjusted to living in his home world, but often returns to the House. He brings Ritter to visit the House, tends to Ketterley's body as he did to the other thirteen decedents, and accompanies Raphael during her own exploration of the House. He reflects that he is no longer quite Rose Sorensen or Piranesi, but must construct a third identity from the remnants of the other two. He accepts the modern world as an extension of the House's divinity after beginning to encounter the statues' subjects in his daily life.

== Background and publication ==
Piranesi is Clarke's second novel, following her debut Jonathan Strange & Mr Norrell (2004), which sold 4 million copies worldwide and was adapted into a BBC miniseries of the same name in 2015. Shortly after the publication of Jonathan Strange & Mr Norrell, Clarke became ill with what was later diagnosed as chronic fatigue syndrome. Her writing became a "torturous" process. She worked on several projects, including a sequel to Jonathan Strange & Mr Norrell, but found herself "incapable of making decisions": "I found it impossible to decide between one version of a sentence and another version, but also between having the plot go in this direction and having it go in that direction. Everything became like uncontained bushes, shooting out in all directions." Clarke credits a visit to the set of the Jonathan Strange & Mr Norrell miniseries with reinvigorating her confidence as an author. She had felt weighed down by the "consciousness" of her time spent inactive and unable to complete projects, and decided to "simplify" what she was asking of herself. Piranesi was a longtime unfinished project of Clarke's which "probably predates Jonathan Strange & Mr Norrell". She decided to return to it as she deemed it "more manageable": "I thought, it doesn't have hundreds of characters and it won't require a huge amount of research because I don't know what research I could do for it."

Piranesi was published in hardback, e-book and audio format on 15 September 2020 by Bloomsbury Publishing. The audiobook version was narrated by actor Chiwetel Ejiofor.

== Reception ==
Piranesi received a number of admiring reviews.

Sarah Ditum of The Times gave the novel a rave review, writing, "After all that time, she has produced a second novel that is close to perfect."

Ron Charles of The Washington Post called it "infinitely clever" and praised Piranesi's acceptance of his imprisonment for unintentionally making the novel "resonate with a planet in quarantine" due to the COVID-19 pandemic.

Publishers Weekly called it an "inventive" novel, praising Clarke's subtlety in progressing the novel's storyline.

Gary K. Wolfe of Locus highlighted Clarke's continuing themes of lost knowledge and magic, while also commending the novel's formal, archaic narrative voice. Wolfe characterised the structure of the novel as both elegant and "hypnotic". He also underscored the story's risks, such as putting readers one step ahead of its "ingenuous" protagonist and presenting its character roles as "shifty and indeterminate" for much of the book. However, Wolfe ultimately praised Piranesi for its "astonishing narrative performance" that he deemed was as intriguing as Clarke's first book.

== Allusions ==
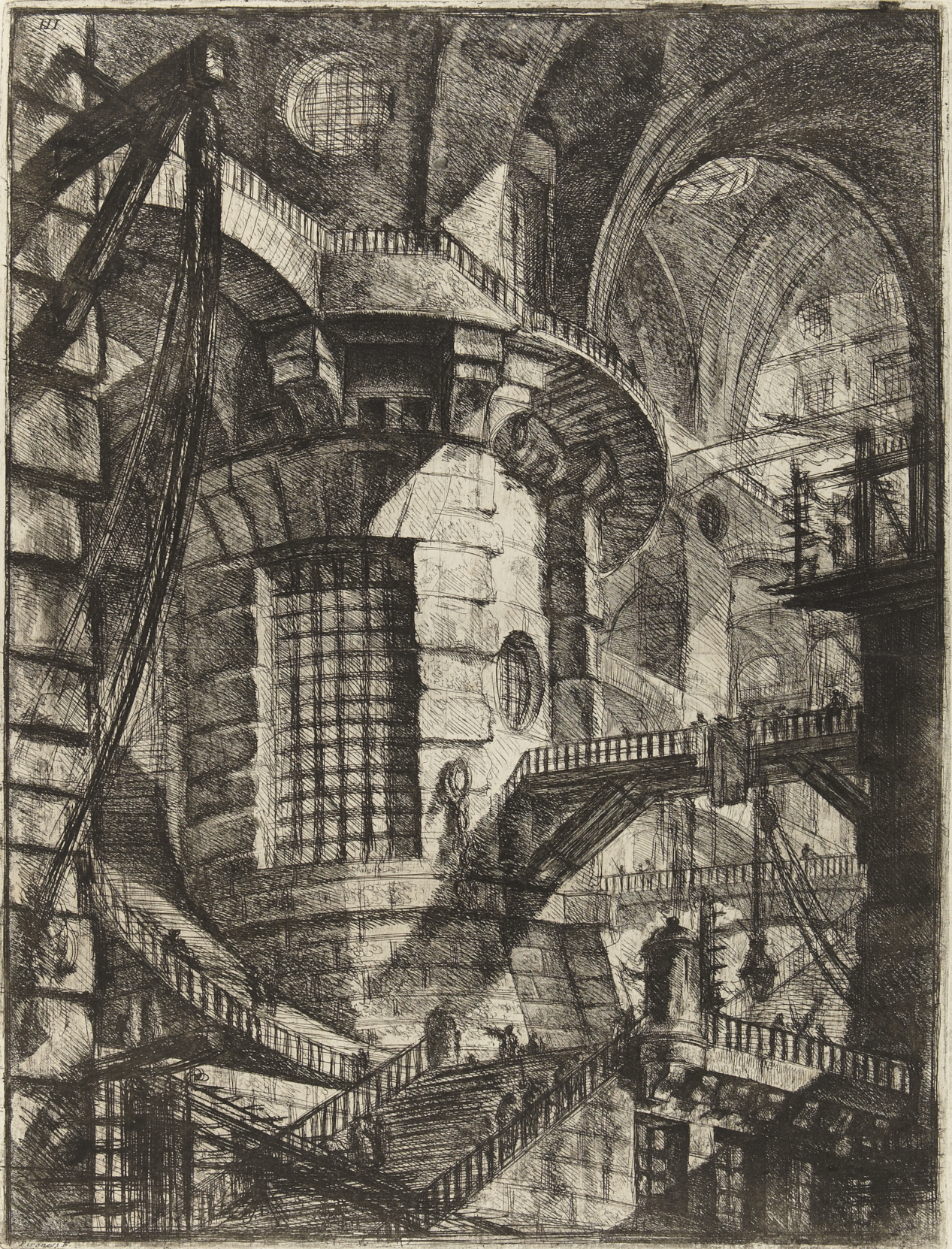
The Round Tower, Giovanni Battista Piranesi

The title of the novel alludes to the 18th-century Italian artist Giovanni Battista Piranesi, who produced a series of sixteen prints entitled Imaginary Prisons which depict enormous subterranean vaults with stairs and mighty machines.

Piranesi contains several references or allusions to C. S. Lewis's series The Chronicles of Narnia. In the "Statues" entry of Part I, the narrator of Piranesi notes that he dreamt of a faun "standing in a snowy forest and speaking to a female child", likely a reference to Lucy Pevensie meeting the faun Mr. Tumnus in The Lion, the Witch and the Wardrobe. The character of Dr. Valentine Andrew Ketterley is evocative of Andrew Ketterley, the villain in The Magician's Nephew, A line from whom is used as the epigraph of Piranesi. In addition, there are several similarities between the House of Piranesi and the so-called "Wood between the Worlds" of The Magician's Nephew. Both are alternative worlds (distinct from our own) that must be reached through supernatural means, both contain life but of a less varied nature than that in the characters' original worlds, and both induce a state of forgetfulness in newcomers, making them believe that they have always been in the new, supernatural world.

The story of Piranesi has been compared to Plato's allegory of the cave. In the story of Piranesi, Piranesi is confined to a world filled with nothing but statues, which represent a greater reality of which he is simultaneously ignorant. In Plato's allegory of the cave, a character, possessing no knowledge of the outside world, is imprisoned within a dark cave with nothing but shadows, reflections of the actual world, projected on the cave wall.

Piranesi also contains allusions to the work of Jorge Luis Borges, in particular his short stories "The Library of Babel" and "The House of Asterion", which Clarke has discussed in an interview.

== Adaptations ==
=== Radio ===
Piranesi was adapted and abridged for BBC Radio 4, read by Samuel Anderson, and broadcast as ten 15-minute episodes in February 2022.

=== Film ===
In June 2024, it was announced that the American stop-motion studio Laika had acquired the rights to adapt the novel into an animated feature film, to be directed by Travis Knight. David Kajganich was announced to write the script.

=== Theatre ===
In October 2026, it was announced that the Royal Shakespeare Company would put on a staged production of the novel, written by Sami Ibrahim and directed by Ned Bennett. The play is expected to run from July to August 2027.

== Awards and honours ==
| Year | Award | Result | Ref. |
|---|---|---|---|
| 2020 | BSFA Award for Best Novel | Shortlisted | |
| 2020 | Costa Book Awards (Novel) | Shortlisted | |
| 2020 | Goodreads Choice Awards (Fantasy) | Nominated | |
| 2020 | Nebula Award for Best Novel | Nominated | |
| 2020 | Ray Bradbury Prize | Finalist | |
| 2021 | Audie Award (Audiobook of the Year) | Won | |
| 2021 | Hugo Award for Best Novel | Finalist | |
| 2021 | Kitschies Red Tentacle (Best Novel) | Won | |
| 2021 | Women's Prize for Fiction | Won | |
| 2021 | World Fantasy Award for Best Novel | Nominated | |
| 2022 | Mythopoeic Award for Fantasy | Finalist | |
