= Plenty series =

Space opera series by Colin Greenland

The Plenty series is a space opera series by British writer Colin Greenland, consisting of three novels and two short stories.

== Setting ==
At the time of the first book in Greenland's future history (Take Back Plenty), many of the sentient species in the Milky Way (including humans) are client races of advanced aliens known as the Capellans. The main character is Tabitha Jute, a space pilot from Luna and owner of the starship Alice Liddell. The series itself is named after the worldship Plenty. Jute's story was continued in Seasons of Plenty and Mother of Plenty.

The story "In the Garden", part of the collection The Plenty Principle, features the Zodiac twins from the first novel while "The Well Wishers" (found in the same collection) serves as a prologue to the main series, as Jute attempts to collect a number of artworks from Umbriel.
