= Daybreak on a Different Mountain =

1984 Novel by Collin Greenland

First edition (publ. Allen & Unwin) Cover Artist: Steve Weston

Daybreak on a Different Mountain is a novel by Colin Greenland published in 1984.

== Plot summary ==
Daybreak on a Different Mountain is a novel in which a fighter and a mystical poet go on a quest to redeem their sealed city.

== Reception ==
Dave Langford reviewed Daybreak on a Different Mountain for White Dwarf #61, and stated that "I found this one unusually well written, but short on narrative energy."

== Reviews ==
- Review by Faren Miller (1985) in Locus, #288 January 1985
- Review by Brian Stableford (1985) in Fantasy Review, June 1985
- Review by Christopher Fowler (1985) in Interzone, #12 Summer 1985
- Review by Don D'Ammassa (1986) in Science Fiction Chronicle, #86 November 1986
