= The Dweller in High Places =

- Genre: Historical fantasy
- Running time: 15 minutes
- Country of origin: United Kingdom
- Language: English
- Home station: BBC 7
- Written by: Susanna Clarke
- Produced by: Gemma Jenkins
- Narrated by: Georgina Hagen
- Original release: 26 February 2007

"The Dweller in High Places" is a short story by Susanna Clarke. An audio production, narrated by Georgina Hagen, was broadcast on BBC 7's The 7th Dimension program as part of the Blood Lines series. It was broadcast on 26 February 2007 at 18:30 GMT, and re-aired in several subsequent years.

The story was published in 2010, in Tails of Wonder and Imagination, an anthology of fantasy stories about cats, edited by Ellen Datlow.

== Plot ==
Lucy Manners is a 12-year-old girl who has been sent to Mrs Hackett's School on Titchfield Street, London. After encountering several unpleasant fellow students, Lucy discovers the Greek Sphinx in the school's attic. The two become fast friends, sharing conversations, despite the Sphinx's quarrelsome nature.

Lucy soon discovers that the Sphinx, considering herself a blight upon man, has come to London to query men with riddles and, when they fail to answer correctly, to strangle them. In order to prevent this massacre, Lucy opts to be the first person to attempt to answer a riddle, which she does correctly.
