= The Hour of the Thin Ox =

1987 novel by Colin Greenland

The Hour of the Thin Ox is a novel by Colin Greenland published in 1987.

== Plot summary ==
The Hour of the Thin Ox is a novel in which warfare is conducted using balloons, old-fashioned guns, and biological weapons.

== Reception ==
Dave Langford reviewed The Hour of the Thin Ox for White Dwarf #91, and stated that "Greenland's real story begins in the southern jungle at about chapter 12, and continues into mystery beyond the end of the book: yet I don't think there's to be a sequel. Odd."

== Reviews ==
- Review by Faren Miller (1986) in Locus, #308 September 1986
- Review by Pauline Morgan (1987) in Fantasy Review, July-August 1987
- Review by Paul Brazier (1987) in Vector 139
- Review by David V. Barrett (1989) in Foundation, #44 Winter 1988/89
