= Take Back Plenty =

1990 novel by Colin Greenland

- First edition
- Author: Colin Greenland
- Cover artist: Steve Crisp
- Language: English
- Series: Plenty series
- Genre: Science fiction
- Publisher: Unwin Hyman
- Publication date: 1990
- Publication place: United Kingdom
- Media type: Print (Paperback)
- Pages: 359
- ISBN: 978-0-04-440265-7
- Followed by: Seasons of Plenty

Take Back Plenty (1990), is a novel by British writer Colin Greenland, which won both major British science fiction awards, the 1990 British SF Association award and the 1991 Arthur C. Clarke Award, as well as being a nominee for the 1992 Philip K. Dick Award for the best original paperback published that year in the United States.

The Plenty series starts with Take Back Plenty and continues with Seasons of Plenty (1995), the collection The Plenty Principle (1997), containing a prequel to the series "In the Garden: The Secret Origin of the Zodiac Twins". and Mother of Plenty (1998)

== Plot ==
While it is a time of festivity on Mars, freighter captain Tabitha Jute isn't interested in the celebration. She is trying to elude planetary law enforcement agencies, almost bankrupt and about to lose her sole asset and her best friend, her starship "Alice Liddell". Unexpectedly, millionaire entertainer and entrepreneur Marco Metz arrives at her hideout and promises remuneration if she takes him to the distant giant spaceship Plenty, as well as his band. However, Metz is not what he seems. He is actually the estranged father of two of the other band members, who appear to be in an incestuous relationship, and has also engaged Jute under false pretenses, intending to steal the Frasque, an alien artefact. En route, they become entangled with the Capellans, an advanced alien species who have confined humanity to the Solar System and prohibited interstellar travel .

== Reception ==
Both Michael Moorcock and Brian Aldiss praised the novel. Moorcock stated that the novel was "intelligent, literate space opera" in the tradition of The Stars My Destination, The Paradox Men by Charles L. Harness and Nova.

== Sources ==
- Clute, John and Peter Nicholls. The Encyclopedia of Science Fiction. New York: St. Martin's Griffin 1993 (2nd edition 1995). ISBN 0-312-13486-X.
