= Susanna Clarke =

British author

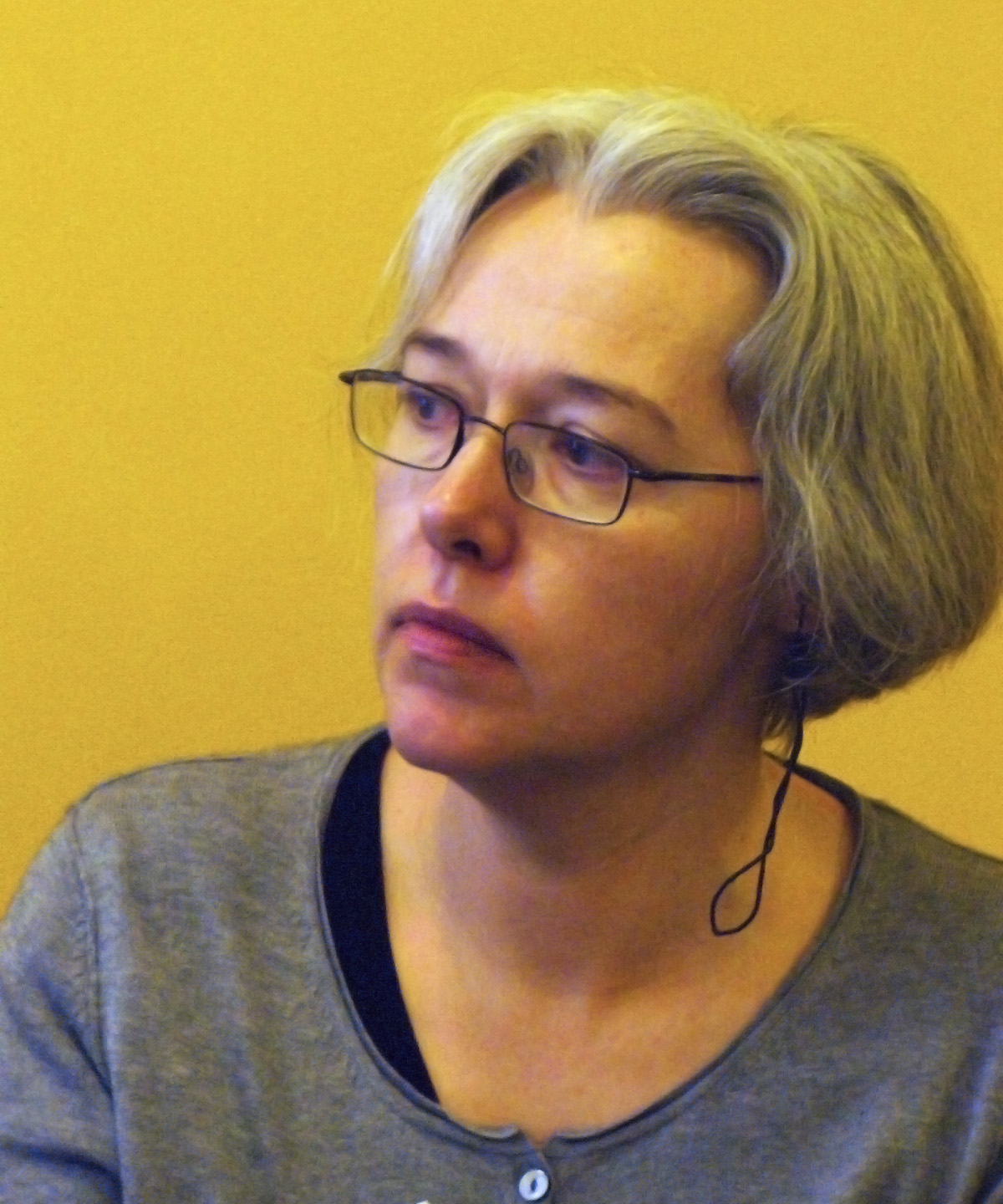
- Clarke in 2006
- Born: Susanna Mary Clarke; 1 November 1959 (age 67); Nottingham, England
- Education: St. Hilda's College, Oxford
- Occupation: Novelist
- Partner: Colin Greenland
- Writing career
- Genres: Fantasy, alternate history
- Notable works: Jonathan Strange & Mr Norrell; The Ladies of Grace Adieu and Other Stories; Piranesi
- Notable awards: Hugo Award (2005); Locus Award (2005); Women's Prize for Fiction (2021)

Susanna Mary Clarke (born 1 November 1959) is an English author best known for her debut novel Jonathan Strange & Mr Norrell (2004), a Hugo Award-winning alternative history. Clarke began Jonathan Strange in 1993 and worked on it during her spare time. For the next decade, she published short stories from the Strange universe, but it was not until 2003 that Bloomsbury bought her manuscript and began work on its publication. The novel became a best-seller.

Two years later, she published a collection of her short stories, The Ladies of Grace Adieu and Other Stories (2006). Both Clarke's debut novel and her short stories are set in a magical England and written in a pastiche of the styles of 19th-century writers such as Jane Austen and Charles Dickens. While Strange focuses on the relationship of two English magicians with opposing views, Jonathan Strange and Gilbert Norrell, the stories in Ladies focus on the power female characters gain through magic.

Clarke's second novel, Piranesi, won the 2021 Women's Prize for Fiction. In January 2024, Clarke shared that she was working on a novel set in Bradford, England.

== Early life and background ==
Clarke was born in Nottingham, England, the eldest daughter of a Methodist minister and his wife. Owing to her father's posts, she spent her childhood in various towns across Northern England and Scotland, and enjoyed reading the works of Sir Arthur Conan Doyle, Charles Dickens, and Jane Austen. She studied philosophy, politics, and economics at St Hilda's College, Oxford, receiving her degree in 1981.

For eight years, she worked in publishing at Quarto and Gordon Fraser. She spent two years teaching English as a foreign language in Turin, Italy, and Bilbao, Spain. She returned to England in 1992 and spent the rest of that year in County Durham, in a house that looked out over the North Sea. There she began working on her first novel, Jonathan Strange and Mr Norrell. In 1993, she was hired by Simon & Schuster in Cambridge to edit cookbooks, a job she kept for the next ten years.

== Writing Career ==
=== Jonathan Strange and Mr Norrell ===
Clarke first developed the idea for Jonathan Strange & Mr Norrell while she was teaching in Bilbao: "I had a kind of waking dream ... about a man in 18th-century clothes in a place rather like Venice, talking to some English tourists. And I felt strongly that he had some sort of magical background – he'd been dabbling in magic, and something had gone badly wrong." She had also recently reread J. R. R. Tolkien's The Lord of the Rings and afterwards was inspired to "[try] writing a novel of magic and fantasy".

After she returned from Spain in 1993, Clarke began to think seriously about writing her novel. She signed up for a five-day fantasy and science-fiction writing workshop, co-taught by science fiction and fantasy writers Colin Greenland and Geoff Ryman. The students were expected to prepare a short story before attending, but Clarke only had "bundles" of material for her novel. From this she extracted "The Ladies of Grace Adieu", a fairy tale about three women secretly practising magic who are discovered by the famous Jonathan Strange. Greenland was so impressed with the story that, without Clarke's knowledge, he sent an excerpt to his friend, the fantasy writer Neil Gaiman. Gaiman later said, "It was terrifying from my point of view to read this first short story that had so much assurance ... It was like watching someone sit down to play the piano for the first time and she plays a sonata." Gaiman showed the story to his friend, science-fiction writer and editor Patrick Nielsen Hayden. Clarke learned of these events when Nielsen Hayden called and offered to publish her story in his anthology Starlight 1 (1996), which featured pieces by well-regarded science-fiction and fantasy writers. She accepted, and the book won the World Fantasy Award for best anthology in 1997.

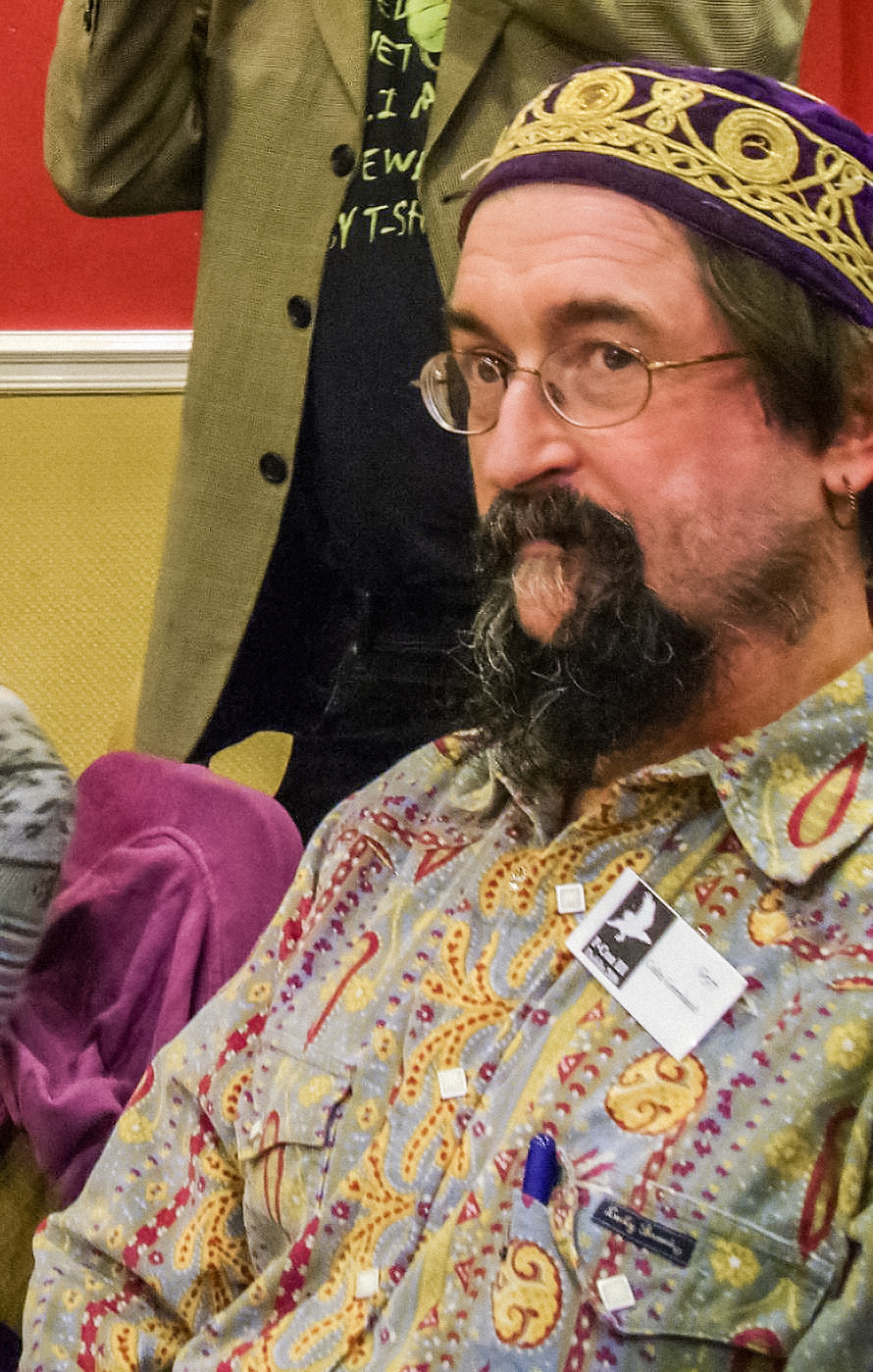
Colin Greenland, Clarke's partner, did not read Jonathan Strange & Mr Norrell until it was published.

Clarke spent the next ten years working on the novel in her spare time. She also published stories in Starlight 2 (1998) and Starlight 3 (2001); according to The New York Times Magazine, her work was known and appreciated by a small group of fantasy fans and critics on the internet. Overall, she published seven short stories in anthologies. "Mr Simonelli, or The Fairy Widower" was shortlisted for a World Fantasy Award in 2001.

Clarke was never sure if she would finish her novel or if it would be published. Clarke tried to write for three hours each day, beginning at 5:30 am, but struggled to keep this schedule. Rather than writing the novel from beginning to end, she wrote in fragments and attempted to stitch them together. Clarke, admitting that the project was for herself and not for the reader, "clung to this method" "because I felt that if I went back and started at the beginning, [the novel] would lack depth, and I would just be skimming the surface of what I could do. But if I had known it was going to take me ten years, I would never have begun. I was buoyed up by thinking that I would finish it next year, or the year after next." Clarke and Greenland fell in love while she was writing the novel and moved in together.

Around 2001, Clarke "had begun to despair", and started looking for someone to help her finish and sell the book. Giles Gordon became her first literary agent and sold the unfinished manuscript to Bloomsbury in early 2003, after two publishers rejected it as unmarketable. Bloomsbury were so sure the novel would be a success that they offered Clarke a £1 million advance. They printed 250,000 hardcover copies simultaneously in the United States, Britain, and Germany. Seventeen translations were begun before the first English publication was released on 8 September 2004 in the United States and on 30 September in the United Kingdom.

Jonathan Strange & Mr Norrell is an alternate history novel set in 19th-century England during the Napoleonic Wars. It is based on the premise that magic once existed in England and has returned with two men: Gilbert Norrell and Jonathan Strange. Centring on the relationship between these two men, the novel investigates the nature of Englishness and the boundary between reason and madness. It has been described as a fantasy novel, an alternative history, and an historical novel and draws on various Romantic literary traditions, such as the comedy of manners, the Gothic tale, and the Byronic hero. Clarke's style has frequently been described as a pastiche, particularly of 19th-century British writers such as Charles Dickens, Jane Austen, and George Meredith. The supernatural is contrasted with and highlighted by mundane details and Clarke's tone combines arch wit with antiquarian quaintness. The text is supplemented with almost 200 footnotes, outlining the backstory and an entire fictional corpus of magical scholarship. The novel was well received by critics and reached number three on the New York Times best-seller list, remaining on the list for eleven weeks.

A seven-part adaptation of the book by the BBC began broadcast on BBC One on Sunday 17 May 2015. The book was adapted by Peter Harness, directed by Toby Haynes, and produced by Cuba Pictures and Feel Films.

=== The Ladies of Grace Adieu and Other Stories ===
In 2006, Clarke published a collection of eight fairy tales presented as the work of several different writers, seven of which had been previously anthologized. The volume's focus on "female mastery of the dark arts" is reflected in the ladies of Grace Adieu's magical abilities and the prominent role needlework plays in saving the Duke of Wellington and Mary, Queen of Scots. The collection is a "sly, frequently comical, feminist revision" of Jonathan Strange. In tone, the stories are similar to the novel—"nearly every one of them is told in a lucid, frequently deadpan, bedtime-story voice strikingly similar to the voice that narrates the novel."

The title story, "The Ladies of Grace Adieu", is set in early 19th-century Gloucestershire and concerns the friendship of three young women, Cassandra Parbringer, Miss Tobias, and Mrs. Fields. Though the events of the story do not actually appear in Jonathan Strange & Mr Norrell, they are referenced in a footnote in Chapter 43. Clarke has said, "For a long time it was my hope that these three ladies should eventually find a place in ... the novel ... I decided there was no place for them ... I deliberately kept women to the domestic sphere in the interests of authenticity ... it was important that real and alternate history appeared to have converged. This meant that I needed to write the women and the servants, as far as possible, as they would have been written in a 19th-century novel." Reviewers highlighted this tale, one calling it "the most striking story" of the collection and "a staunchly feminist take on power relations". In her review of the volume in Strange Horizons, Victoria Hoyle writes that "there is something incredibly precise, clean, and cold about Clarke's portrayal of 'women's magic' in this story (and throughout the collection)—it is urgent and desperate, but it is also natural and in the course of things."

The collection received many positive reviews, though some critics compared the short stories unfavourably with the highly acclaimed and more substantial Jonathan Strange and Mr Norrell. Hoyle wrote in her review that "the stories ... are consistently subtle and enchanting, and as charismatic as any reader could wish, but, while the collection has the panache of the novel, it lacks its glorious self-possession."

=== Piranesi ===
When she began writing her next book, Clarke was living in Cambridge with her partner, the science fiction novelist and reviewer Colin Greenland. They met when she took his fantasy writing course. She was, in 2004, working on a book that begins a few years after Jonathan Strange & Mr Norrell ends and which would involve characters who, as Clarke said, are "a bit lower down the social scale". She commented in 2005 and 2007 that progress on the book had been slowed by her ill health. In 2006 it was reported that she suffered from chronic fatigue syndrome. Clarke found that writing the sequel to Jonathan Strange & Mr Norrell was becoming too complex considering her illness, and she returned instead to an earlier project with fewer characters and requiring less research – which became her second novel. While writing this book she moved to Derbyshire.

In September 2019, Publishers Weekly reported that Clarke's second novel would be titled Piranesi and published in September 2020 by Bloomsbury. Quoting their press release, "A Bloomsbury spokesperson said the novel is set in 'a richly imagined, very unusual world.' The title character lives in a place called the House and is needed by his friend, the Other, to work on a scientific project. The publisher went on: 'Piranesi records his findings in his journal. Then messages begin to appear; all is not what it seems. A terrible truth unravels as evidence emerges of another person and perhaps even another world outside the House's walls.'" Piranesi was published on 15 September 2020 by Bloomsbury. The audiobook is narrated by actor Chiwetel Ejiofor.

=== "The Bishop of Durham Attempts to Surrender the City" ===
In October 2026, Clarke released a 96 page illustrated short story, "The Bishop of Durham Attempts to Surrender the City", through Bloomsbury, hardcover edition. The story takes place 700 years before the events of Jonathan Strange and Mr Norrell.

== Awards and nominations ==
Year	Work	Award	Result	Ref.
2001	"Mr Simonelli, or the Fairy Widower"	World Fantasy Award for Best Novella	Shortlisted	
2004	Jonathan Strange & Mr Norrell	Booker Prize	Longlisted	
2004	Jonathan Strange & Mr Norrell	Guardian First Book Award	Shortlisted	
2004	Jonathan Strange & Mr Norrell	Whitbread First Novel Award	Shortlisted	
2004	Jonathan Strange & Mr Norrell	Time's Best Novel of the Year	Won	
2005	Jonathan Strange & Mr Norrell	British Book Awards Literary Fiction Award	Shortlisted	
2005	Jonathan Strange & Mr Norrell	Hugo Award for Best Novel	Won	
2005	Jonathan Strange & Mr Norrell	Locus Award for Best First Novel	Won	
2005	Jonathan Strange & Mr Norrell	Mythopoeic Award for Adult Literature	Won	
2005	Jonathan Strange & Mr Norrell	Nebula Award for Best Novel	Shortlisted	
2005	Jonathan Strange & Mr Norrell	World Fantasy Award for Best Novel	Won	
2005	—	British Book Awards as Newcomer of the Year	Won	
2020	Piranesi	Costa Book Award for Novel	Shortlisted	
2020	Piranesi	Nebula Award for Best Novel	Shortlisted	
2020	Piranesi	Ray Bradbury Prize	Finalist	
2021	Piranesi	Encore Award	Shortlisted	
2021	Piranesi	Hugo Award for Best Novel	Shortlisted	
2021	Piranesi	Kitschies Red Tentacle for Best Novel	Won	
2021	Piranesi	Women's Prize for Fiction	Won	

== List of works ==
=== Novels ===
- —— (September 2004). Jonathan Strange & Mr Norrell (hardcover ed.). New York and London: Bloomsbury. pp. 1–782. ISBN 978-1582344164.
- —— (September 2020). Piranesi (hardcover ed.). New York and London: Bloomsbury. pp. 1–245. ISBN 978-1526622426.

=== Collections ===
- —— (October 2006). The Ladies of Grace Adieu and Other Stories (hardcover US 1st ed.). New York & London: Bloomsbury. pp. 1–235. ISBN 978-1596912519.

=== Short stories ===
Clarke has published her short stories in multiple publications, including traditional press and newspapers as well as radio broadcast. This list contains the first publication of each as well as first appearance of "John Uskglass and the Cumbrian Charcoal Burner" in her collection The Ladies of Grace Adieu and Other Stories.

- Kramer, Ed; Gaiman, Neil, eds. (1996). "Stopp't-Clock Yard". The Sandman: Book of Dreams. New York: Harper Prism.
- Hayden, Patrick Nielsen, ed. (1996). "The Ladies of Grace Adieu". Starlight 1. New York: Tor Books.
- Datlow, Ellen; Windling, Terri, eds. (1997). "On Lickerish Hill". Black Swan, White Raven. New York: Avon.
- Hayden, Patrick Nielsen, ed. (1998). "Mrs Mabb". Starlight 2. New York: Tor Books.
- Vess, Charles, ed. (1999). "The Duke of Wellington Misplaces His Horse". A Fall of Stardust. Green Man Press.
- Datlow, Ellen; Windling, Terri, eds. (2000). "Mr. Simonelli or the Fairy Widower". Black Heart, Ivory Bones. New York: Avon.
- Hayden, Patrick Nielsen, ed. (2001). "Tom Brightwind, or, How the Fairy Bridge Was Built at Thoresby". Starlight 3. New York: Tor Books.
- "Antickes and Frets". The New York Times. 31 October 2004.
- "John Uskglass and the Cumbrian Charcoal Burner". The Ladies of Grace Adieu and Other Stories. New York & London: Bloomsbury. 2006. pp. 221–235.
- Datlow, Ellen, ed. (2010). "The Dweller in High Places". Tails of Wonder and Imagination. San Francisco: Night Shade Books.
- "The Wood at Midwinter". Bloomsbury Publishing. 22 October 2024.
- —— (22 October 2026). The Bishop of Durham Attempts to Surrender the City (hardcover ed.). New York and London: Bloomsbury. p. 96. ISBN 9781037203909.

=== Radio dramas ===
- "The Dweller in High Places". BBC. 26 February 2007.
- "The Wood at Midwinter". BBC. 23 December 2022.
