= Colin Greenland =

British science fiction writer (born 1954)

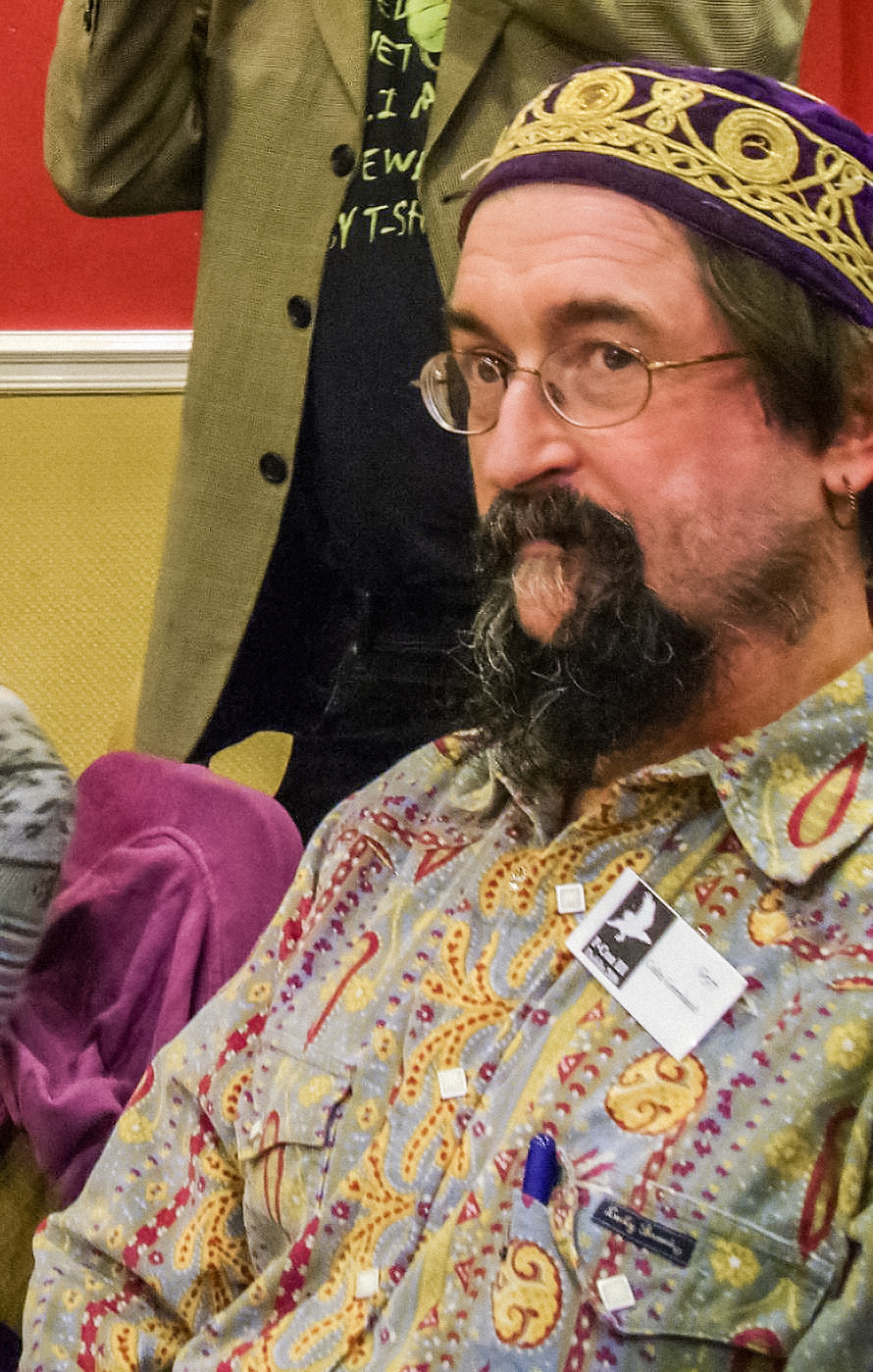
- Greenland in 2006
- Born: 17 May 1954 (age 72); Dover, Kent, England, UK
- Education: Pembroke College, Oxford (BA, MA, DPhil)
- Occupation: Novelist
- Partner: Susanna Clarke
- Writing career
- Genre: Science fiction

Colin Greenland (born 17 May 1954) is a British science fiction writer, whose first story won the second prize in a 1982 Faber & Faber competition. His best-known novel is Take Back Plenty (1990), winner of both major British science fiction awards, the 1990 British SF Association award and the 1991 Arthur C. Clarke Award, as well as being a nominee for the 1992 Philip K. Dick Award for the best original paperback published that year in the United States.

== Biography ==
Colin Greenland attended Pembroke College, Oxford, eventually earning a BA, MA (1978), and DPhil (1981). Greenland's first published book, which was based on his DPhil dissertation, was a critical look at the New Wave entitled The Entropy Exhibition: Michael Moorcock and the British 'New Wave' in Science Fiction (1983). His most successful fictional work is the Plenty series that starts with Take Back Plenty and continues with Seasons of Plenty (1995), The Plenty Principle (1997) and Mother of Plenty (1998).

Besides his work on fiction, Greenland has continued to write non-fiction books and has been active in the Science Fiction Foundation, as well as serving on the editorial committee of Interzone. He has been a guest speaker at four separate Microcons: 1988, 1989, 1993 and 1994.

His wife is the novelist Susanna Clarke, with whom he has lived since 1996.

He is good friends with Neil Gaiman, and is frequently cited among Gaiman's acknowledgments pages.

== Bibliography ==
=== Novels ===
- Daybreak series
  - Daybreak on a Different Mountain. London: Unwin Hyman, 1984. ISBN 0-04-823346-3
  - The Hour of the Thin Ox. London: Unwin Hyman, 1987. ISBN 0-04-823341-2
  - Other Voices. London: Unwin Hyman, 1988. ISBN 0-04-440165-5
- Plenty series
  - Take Back Plenty. London: Unwin Hyman, 1990 (paper). ISBN 0-04-440265-1
  - Seasons of Plenty. London: HarperCollins, 1995. ISBN 0-00-224208-7
  - Mother of Plenty. London: HarperCollins Voyager, 1998 (paper). ISBN 0-00-649907-4
- Harm's Way. London: HarperCollins, 1993. ISBN 0-00-223916-7
- Spiritfeather. London: Orion, 2000 (paper). ISBN 1-85881-710-2
- Finding Helen. London: Black Swan, 2002 (paper). ISBN 0-552-77080-9

=== Collections ===
- The Plenty Principle. London: HarperCollins Voyager, 1997 (paper). ISBN 0-00-649906-6

=== Non-fiction ===
- The Entropy Exhibition: Michael Moorcock and the British 'New Wave' in Science Fiction. London: Routledge & Keegan, 1983. ISBN 0-7100-9310-1
- Storm Warnings: Science Fiction Confronts the Future, with Eric S. Rabkin and George E. Slusser. Carbondale, IL: Southern Illinois University Press, 1987. ISBN 0-8093-1376-6
- Michael Moorcock: Death is No Obstacle. Manchester: Savoy Books, 1992. ISBN 0-86130-087-4

=== As editor ===
- Interzone: The First Anthology, with John Clute and David Pringle. London: Everyman Fiction, 1985. ISBN 978-0-460-02294-1

== Sources ==
- Clute, John and Peter Nicholls. The Encyclopedia of Science Fiction. New York: St. Martin's Griffin 1993 (2nd edition 1995). ISBN 0-312-13486-X.
- Reginald, Robert. Science Fiction and Fantasy Literature, 1975-1991. Detroit, Washington DC, London: Gale Research, Inc., 1992. ISBN 0-8103-1825-3.
