= Piranesi (disambiguation) =

Piranesi is an Italian surname. Notable people with the surname include:

- Giovanni Battista Piranesi (1720–1778), Italian artist
- Francesco Piranesi (1758/59–1810), Italian engraver and architect, son of Giovanni Battista Piranesi
- Laura Piranesi (1754–1790), Italian etcher, daughter of Giovanni Battista Piranesi

== Other uses ==
- Piranesi (software), architectural visualisation software by Informatix Software
- Piranesi (novel), a 2020 novel by Susanna Clarke
