= Studio fotografico Vasari =

Studio fotografico Vasari it is one of the oldest Italian companies operating in the field of photography.

The studio is known for its specialization in architectural photographs and works of art, and for having documented the transformation of Rome in the twentieth century.

Collections of Vasari photographs are held by the International Museum of Photography and Film at George Eastman House in Rochester (New York), at the Istituto Nazionale per la Grafica in Rome, and at the Centro studi e archivio della comunicazione (CSAC) of the University of Parma.

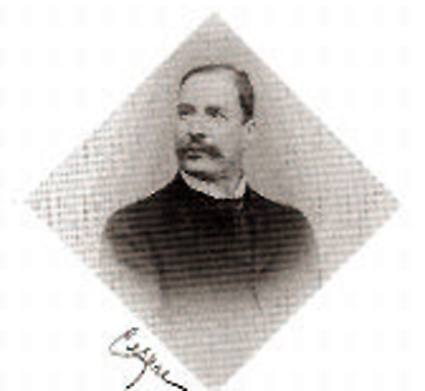
Cesare Vasari

== History ==
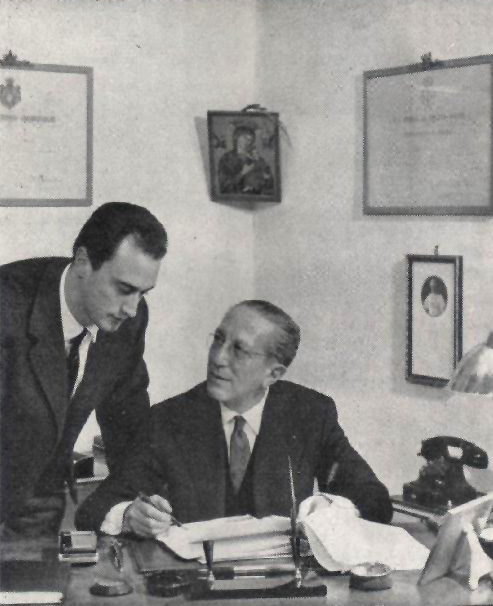
Tommaso and Giorgio Vasari

The company founder Cesare Vasari (Arezzo, 30 May 1846 - Rome, 31 May 1901) moved to Rome in 1860, working initially for professional photographers. He become a collaborator of Tommaso Cuccioni's widow, Isabella Bonafede. In 1875 he opened one of the first ateliers for the production of art and architecture photographs.

After Cesare moved to Florence, the Roman atelier passed to his nephew Alessandro (Rome, 1 July 1866 - 18 March 1929); Alessandro's son Tommaso (Rome, March 21, 1894 - August 25, 1971) documents the artistic and architectural story of Rome of the Twenties, becoming a supplier of the Royal House, and photographing the post-war reconstruction.

Initially, the laboratory for the development and printing of the photographs was located in via della Mercede, subsequently transferred to via Ludovisi and finally to via Condotti, where all the processing of the negatives was carried out, the subsequent printing and final retouching.

Tommaso, who had two children (Laura and Giorgio), was succeeded by Giorgio, a doctor in chemistry (Rome, 11 September 1931 - Filettino, 3 July 2004). Under Giorgio, the business developed in the fields of art, architecture and industry, including the photographic documentation of public works for the 1960 Olympics, the headquarters of the major companies of the Italian "economic boom", as well as editions that dealt with the most important basilicas, churches and Roman galleries of art and antiques.

Subsequently, Giorgio's sons Alessandro (Rome, 25 February 1957), Cecilia (Rome, 16 December 1958), Andrea (Rome, 3 June 1962) e Francesco (Rome, 9 June 1968 - Chefchaouen, 26 July 2022). Alessandro, Andrea e Francesco continued the studio's activity, establishing the Vasari Photographic Archive and enriching it through photographic campaigns commissioned by state bodies, museums, private collections and national and international publishers.

Today the company is directed by Alessandro Vasari.

== Vasari and the architecture ==
The specialization in architectural photography began at first under Cesare Vasari, but Tommaso and Giorgio added a strong impulse to this kind of shooting with their work for important architects such as Enrico Del Debbio, Pier Luigi Nervi, Luigi Walter Moretti and Giuseppe Vaccaro

== The photographic archive ==
The historical archive of Vasari which contains 5,024 plate (in glass 21x27 cm and other 13x18 cm). It is currently available at the Chalcography-Istituto Nazionale per la Grafica.

The third party production from 1910 ca. to immediately postwar period, consisting of 350,000 black and white and color plates and negatives, is kept in the Study and Communication Archive Center (CSAC) of the University of Parma.

The Vasari private archive (about 90,000 films of various positive, negative black/white and color formats and high resolution digital files). This constantly expanding fund includes the photographic production of the Vasari to date.

== Exhibitions on Vasari photographers ==
- Rome 1991: The Vasari: a dynasty of photographers in Rome from 1875 to 1991, 26 February - 30 April, Biblioteca Vallicelliana of Oratorio dei Filippini
- Parma 1994: Plaster and clay: Vasari Rome studio, the Ximenes atelier, curated by Paolo Barbaro, texts by Marzio Pieri, CSAC of University of Parma.
- Milan 2010: Walk the Stones - a journey through time and the streets of Rome, Spazio ILEX of Archivolto - Milan, 14–30 April
- Stockholm 16 October - 6 November 2014: At the origins of the European Union. Italian architecture and art for the Palazzo della Farnesina, Istituto Italiano di Cultura
- Berlin 12 November - 4 December 2014: At the origins of the European Union. Italian architecture and art for the Palazzo della Farnesina, Italian Embassy
- Skopje 11 December 2014 - 21 January 2015: At the origins of the European Union. Italian architecture and art for the Palazzo della Farnesina, Macedonian National Gallery "Chifte Hamam"

== Gallery ==
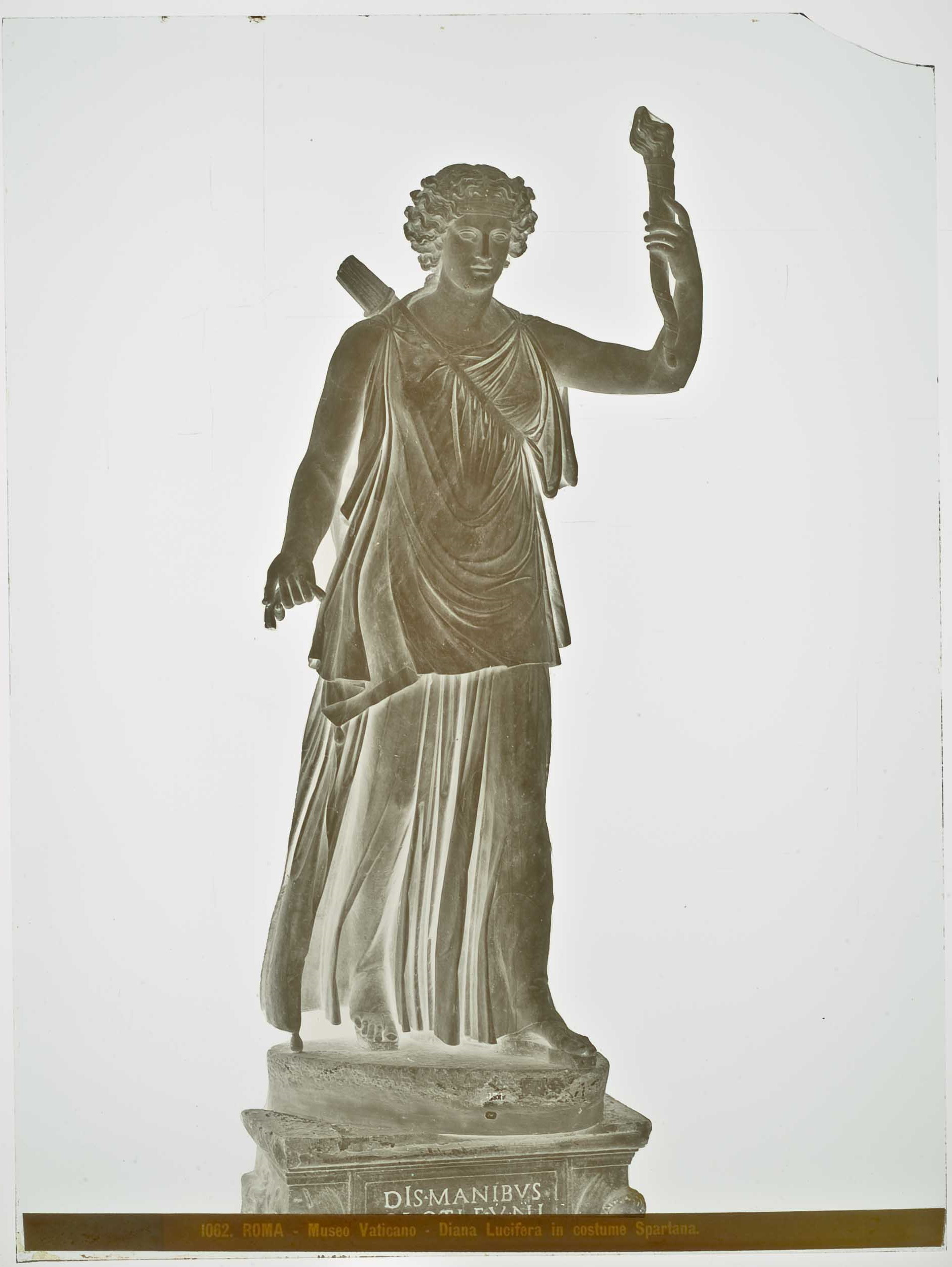
Negative on glass plate, depicting Diana Lancifera, Vatican Museums

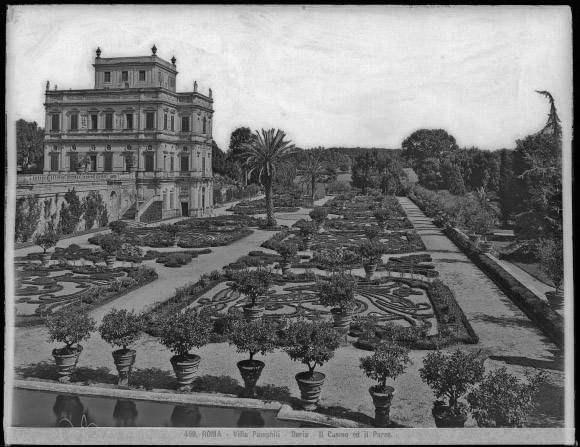
View of Villa Algardi in villa Doria Pamphilj

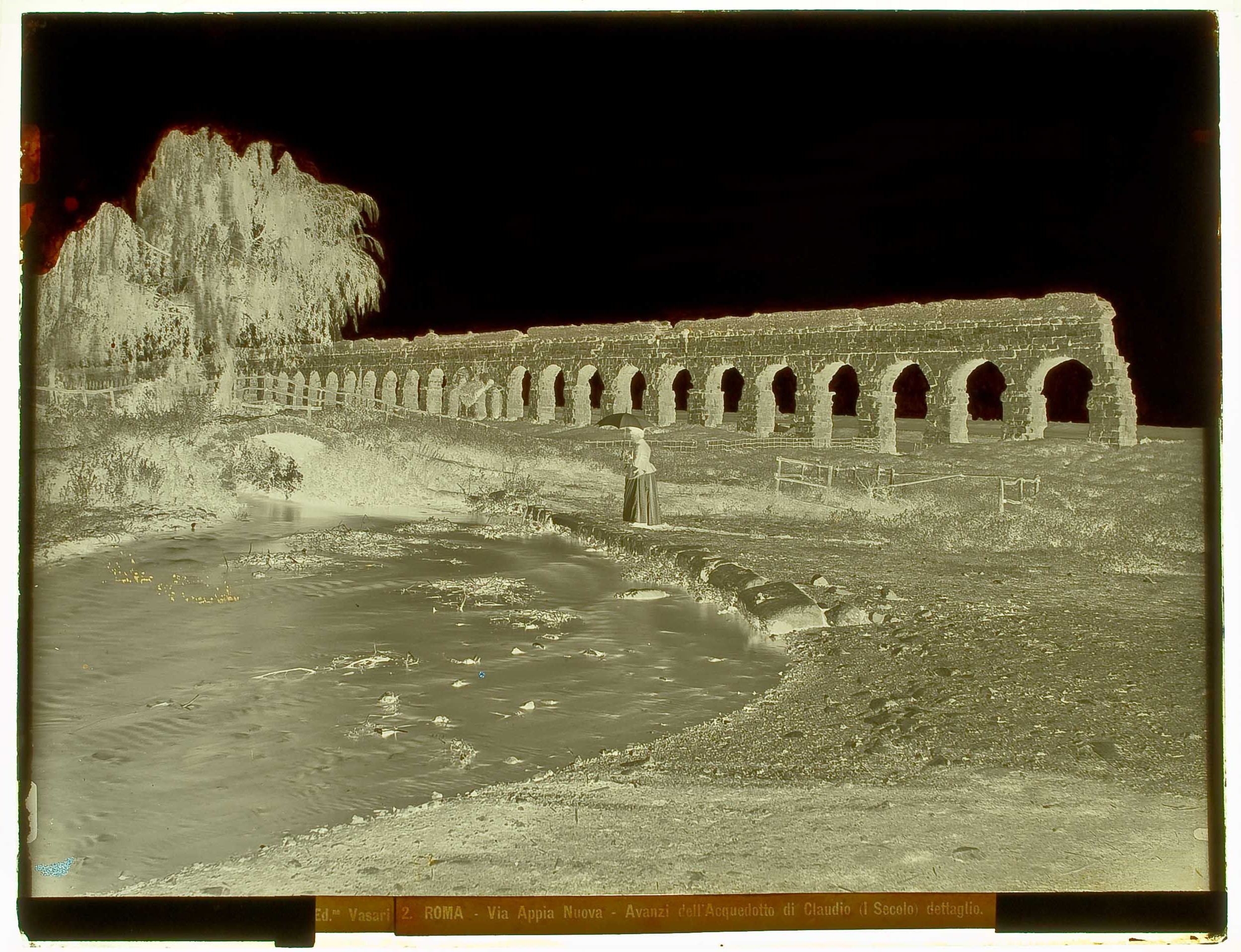
Negative on glass plate, view of Claudio's aqueduct, Via Appia

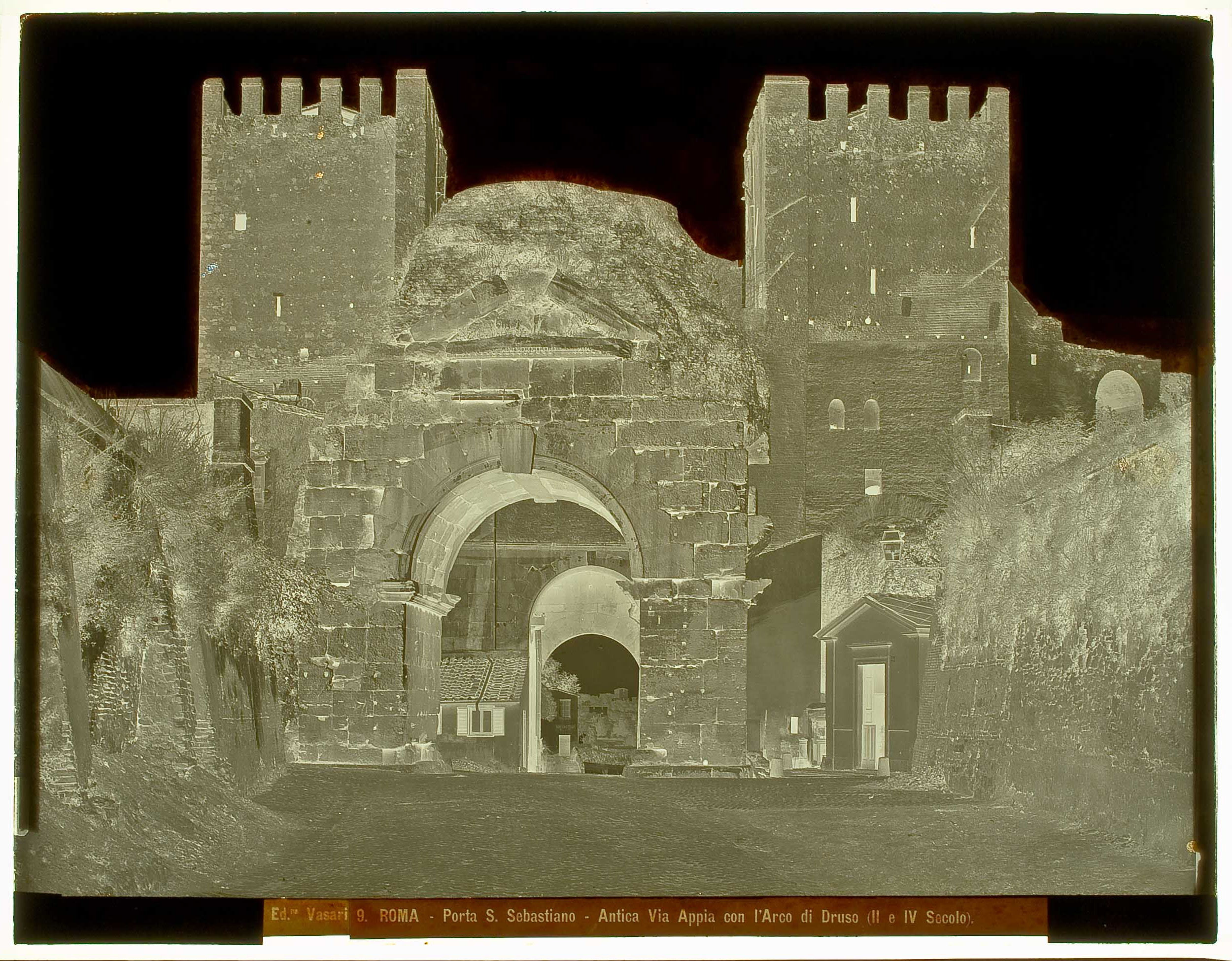
Negative on glass plate, view of Porta San Sebastiano with Arco di Druso, Via Appia

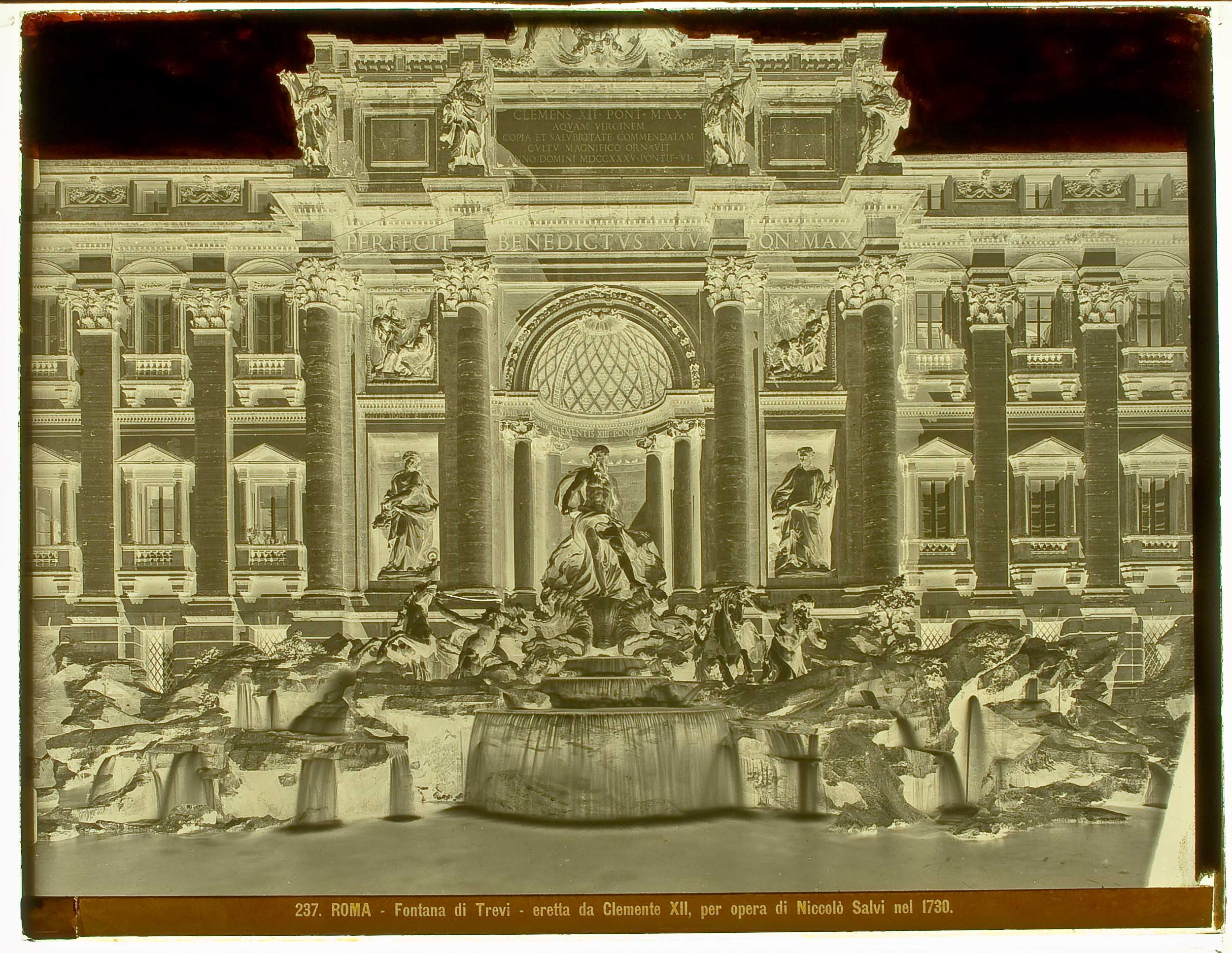
Negative on glass plate, view of the Trevi Fountain work by Niccolò Salvi 1730

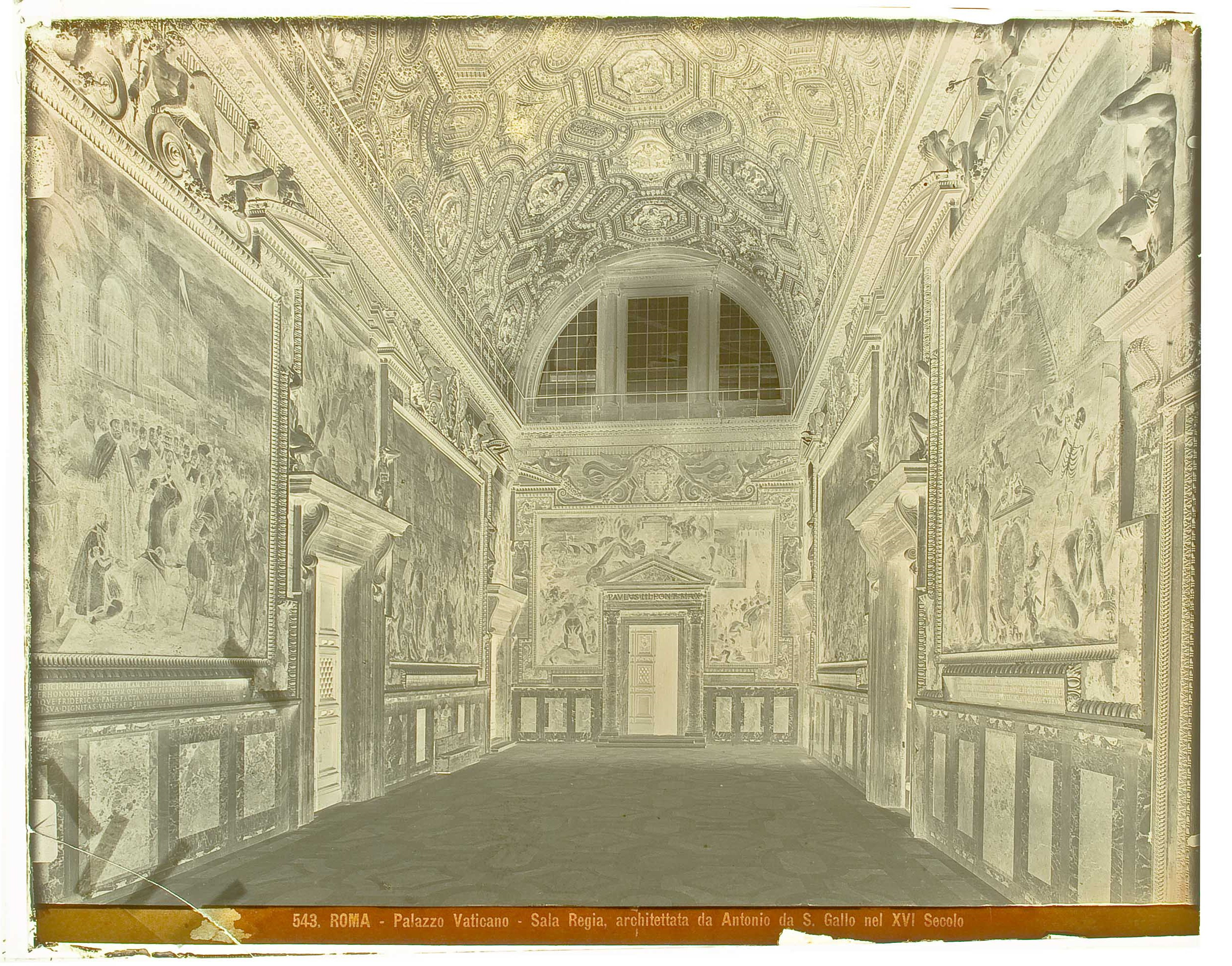
Negative on glass plate, view of the Sala Regia, Vatican Apostolic Palaces

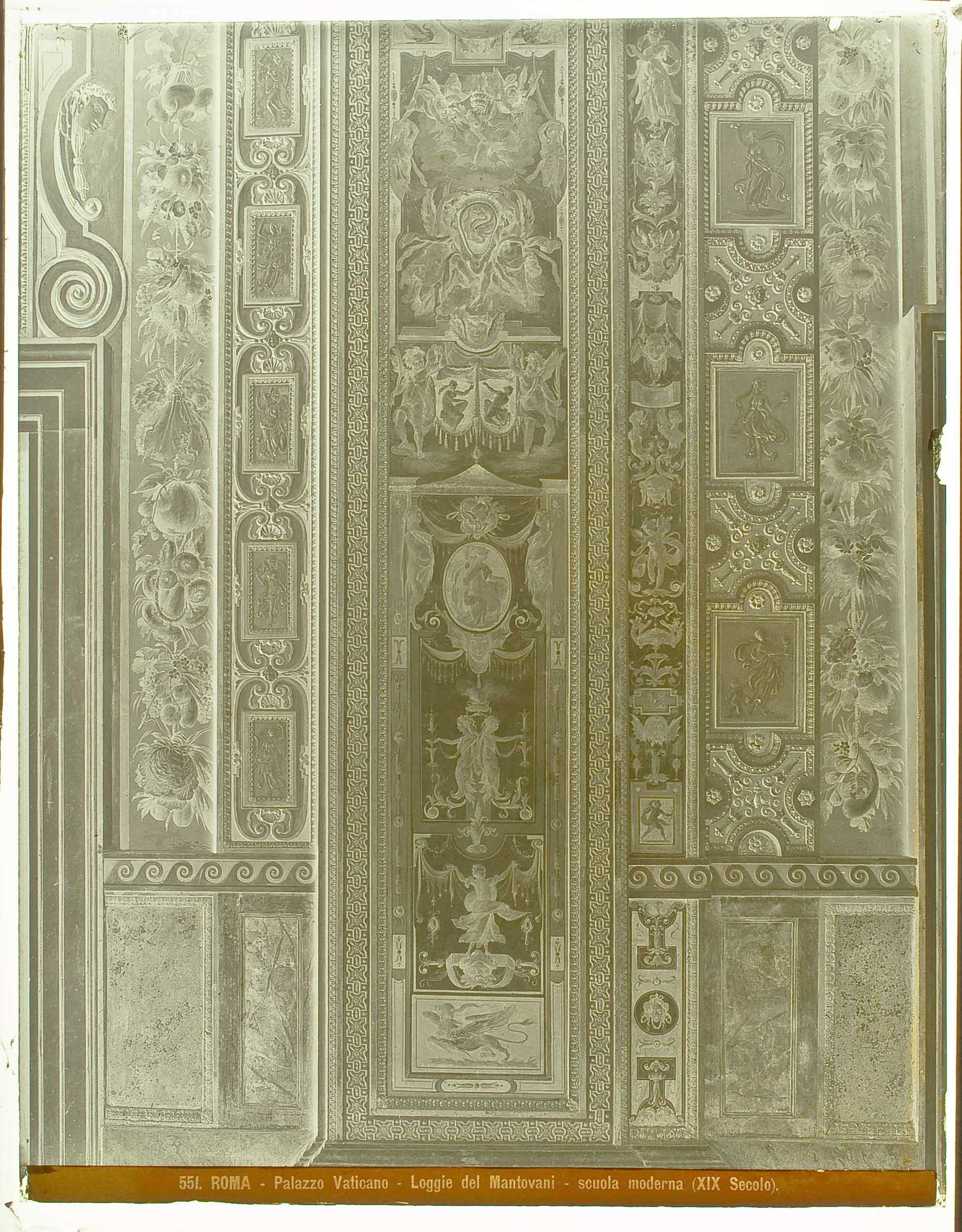
Negative on glass plate, view of the Loggia del Mantovani, Vatican Apostolic Palaces

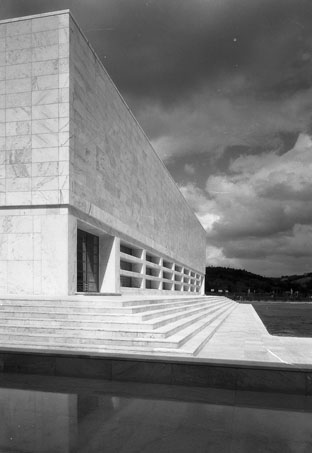
Vasari for the architect Moretti, Entrance with stairs of the Fencing Academy, Foro Italico, Rome

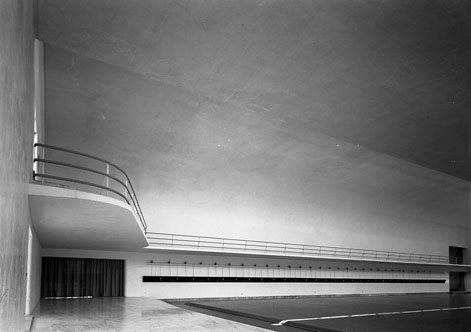
Vasari for the architect Moretti, Fencing Academy at the Foro Italico, Rome

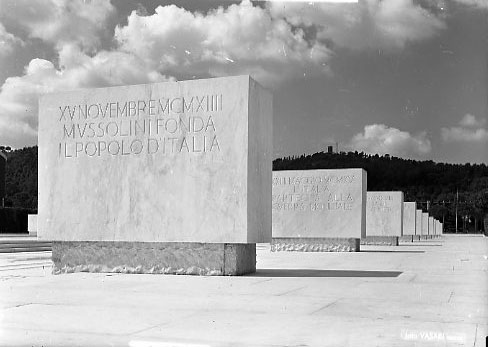
Vasari for the architect Moretti, Foro Italico, Rome

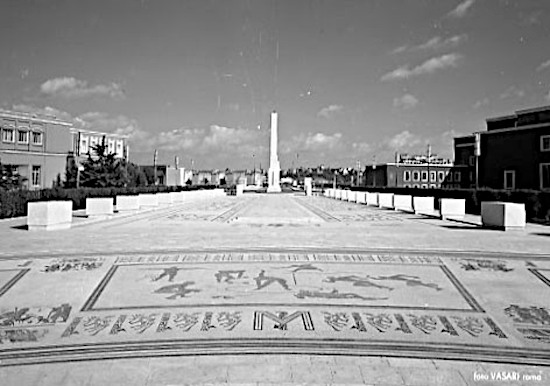
Vasari for the architect Moretti, Panorama of Foro Italico, Rome

== See also ==
- Istituto Nazionale per la Grafica
- Centro studi e archivio della comunicazione
- George Eastman House
- Tommaso Cuccioni
