= Francesco Piranesi =

Italian engraver (died 1810)

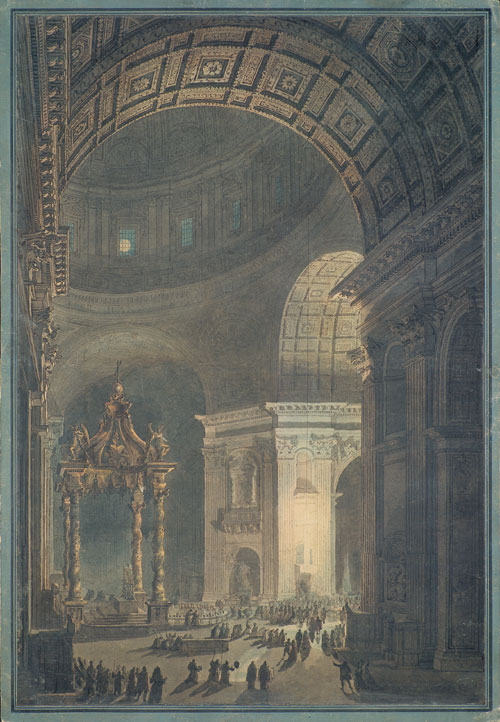
Illumination of the Lenten Cross, etching by Francesco Piranesi, coloring by Louis Jean Desprez

Francesco Piranesi (Italian pronunciation: [franˈtʃesko piraˈneːzi; -eːsi]; 1758/59 – 23 January 1810) was an Italian engraver, etcher and architect. He was the son of the more famous Giovanni Battista Piranesi and continued his series of engravings representing monuments and ancient temples. He worked for a long period in France, where he lived during the French Revolution.

== Life ==
Francesco Piranesi was born in Rome, the eldest son of Giovanni Battista Piranesi and his wife, Angela Pasquini. He was instructed in engraving by his father, together with his older sister Laura (1754–1790), also a noted engraver by the time of her early death. He was both engraving his own works of art and assisting his father's work by 1775. He then started to study with other experts: engraving with Giovanni Volpato, landscape painting under the German Jacob Philipp Hackert and his brother Georg and architecture under Pierre-Adrien Pâris.

Piranesi accompanied his father on two trips to the ancient Roman ruins in Paestum, Pompei and Ercolano, first in 1770, and again in 1778. In this he was part of a group of engravers which collaborated with Benedetto Mori and the architect Augusto Rosa, considered the inventor of felloplastica, the art of constructing scale models of ancient monuments in cork. Giovanni Battista created a series of preparatory drawings about Paestum, which were completed by Francesco. Upon his father's death, shortly after the second trip, Francesco acquired his father's publishing house and was responsible for printing most of the later editions of his prints.

Piranesi collaborated with the French artist Louis Jean Desprez on a series of views of Naples, Pompeii and Rome, which were advertised in 1783 as dessins coloriés and sold at Piranesi's shop in Rome. Although the 1783 advertisement promised 48 views, the series was not completed before Desprez left Rome to enter the employ of King Gustav III of Sweden. In the following years, Piranesi built his reputation primarily upon his engravings of antique statuary.

After the assassination of Gustav III in 1792 Piranesi was employed by Baron Gustaf Adolf Reuterholm, the head of the regent council which ruled Sweden during the minority of Gustav IV Adolf of Sweden. Reuterholm tasked Piranesi with spying on the favourite of the deceased king, Gustaf Mauritz Armfelt, who had been one of the men the king had appointed in the regent council in his will, but whom Reuterholm had deposed. Piranesi managed to steal Armfelt's letters which he had stored in the British embassy in Florence before beginning his work as foreign ambassador to the Kingdom of the Two Sicilies. These letters were the primary evidence used against Armfelt when he was tried in absentia for treason and sentenced to death, a sentence he managed to avoid, however, by fleeing to Russia.

The occupation of the Italian peninsula in 1798 by the French Revolutionary Army led to the establishment of the short-lived Roman Republic. Piranesi soon won the admiration of the French officials directing the republic, becoming a government official. When the republic fell the following year, together with his younger brother, Pietro, he moved to Paris where he soon gained the admiration of Talleyrand. They opened a new branch of the family enterprise there, called Piranesi Frères, which decorated a line of terracotta vases manufactured in imitation of the ancient Etruscan works by Joseph Bonaparte.

In 1807 Pietro Piranesi sold his share of the firm and returned to Rome. Francesco fell upon hard times after this. The Emperor Napoleon came to his help, issuing an imperial decree granting the sum of 300,000 French francs, upon the condition that Piranesi dedicate himself solely to his engraving work, then considered the best in Europe. He died unexpectedly in Paris, however, before he could fulfill his contract.

In 1839, the surviving collection of his engravings was purchased by the Calcografia Camerale, founded by Pope Gregory XVI, and brought to Rome. That institution is now the Istituto Nazionale per la Grafica.

== Works ==
- Raccolta de' tempj antichi, Volume I (1780)
- Il teatro di Ercolano (1785)
- Collezione delle più belle statue di Roma (1786)
- Raccolta de' tempj antichi, Volume II (1790)
- Ragguaglio ossia giornale della venuta e permanenza in Roma di S.A.R. Sofia Albertina Principessa di Svezia (1793)
- Antiquités de la Grande-Grèce, three volumes (1804–1807)

== Bibliography ==
- Rossana Caira Lumetti: La cultura dei lumi tra Italia e Svezia. Il ruolo di Francesco Piranesi. Bonacci Editore, Roma 1990.
- Vincenzo Monti: Lettera di Francesco Piranesi al signor generale D. Giovanni Acton(ed. Rossana Caira Lumetti). Sellerio Editore, Palermo 1991.
- M. Calvesi: Giovan Battista e Francesco Piranesi, catalogo mostra Calcografia Nazionale. De Luca Editore, Roma 1968.
- Alessandro Bettagno: Piranesi-incisioni-rami-legature-architetture, pp 71–76 "La calcografia Piranesi: I rami originali" (ed. Maria Catelli Isola). Neri Pozza Editore, Vicenza 1978.
- Pierluigi Panza: Museo Piranesi. Skira, 2017
