= Palazzo Poli =

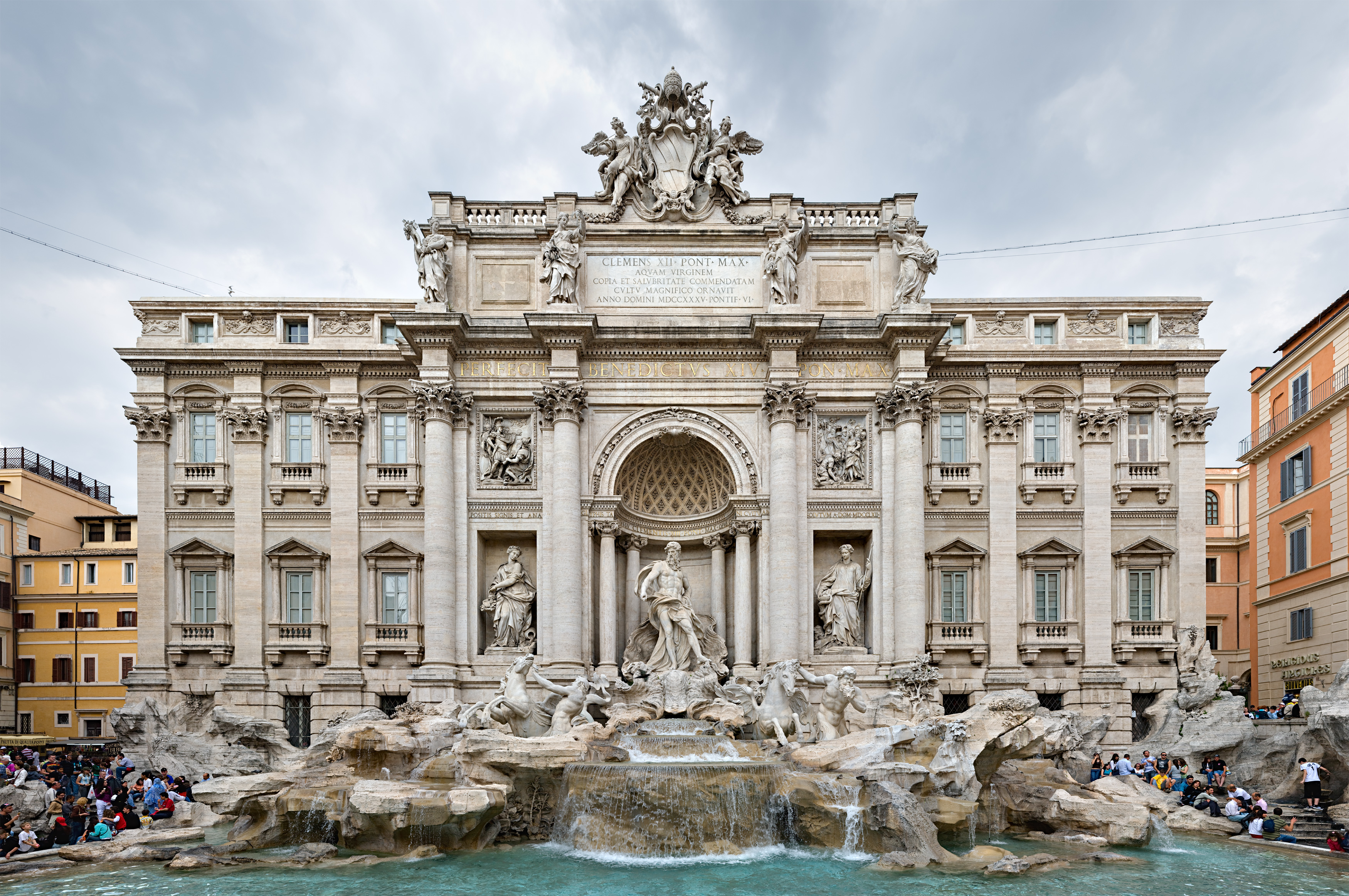
- Click on the map for a fullscreen view

General information
- Architectural style: Baroque
- Location: Rome, Italy
- Coordinates: 41°54′04″N 12°28′59″E

The Palazzo Poli is a palace in Rome, Italy, that was altered in the 18th century to form the backdrop to the Trevi Fountain.

== History ==
In 1566, Lelio dell'Anguillara, Duke of Ceri, purchased the Palazzo Del Monte. He commissioned the Palazzo Ceri, in honor of himself, and hired the architect Martino Longhi the Elder. In 1591, Martino Longhi the Elder died and the architect Ottaviano Nonni was hired to finish the original project.

The House of Borromeo inherited Palazzo Ceri and completed multiple renovations and extensions. Eventually, in 1678, the palace was for sale. Purchased by Lucrezia Colonna, who was married to the Duke of Poli, Giuseppe Lotario Conti. Here, the palace changed names again to how it is known today, Palazzo Conti di Poli, or Palazzo Poli. The Conti family was responsible for many more extensions, including purchasing and incorporating of many adjacent buildings which formed the Piazza di Trevi. The son of Giuseppe Lotario, Duke Stefano Conti, completed these renovations, including demolishing the central portion of the building, before 1730 to allow for the building of the Trevi Fountain.

The new Baroque style south facade of the building was commissioned by Nicola Salvi in 1731. He hired the architect, Luigi Vanvitelli. As a setting for the fountain, Vanvitelli gave the building a new monumental façade that contains the giant order of Corinthian pilasters linking the two main storeys of the palace.

== In popular culture ==
In the 1830s, Princess Zinaida Volkonskaya threw lavish parties in this palace.

== Museum ==
Maria Cristina Misiti, director of the National Institute of Graphics, had the idea to turn the building into a museum to help visitors learn more about the history of Rome and its inhabitants. The Palazzo Poli houses the institute's collection of copper engraving plates dated from the sixteenth century to the present.

Preceded by Palazzo Pamphilj	Landmarks of Rome; Palazzo Poli	Succeeded by Palazzo Corsini, Rome
