= Giuseppe Angelini (sculptor) =

Italian sculptor (1735–1811)

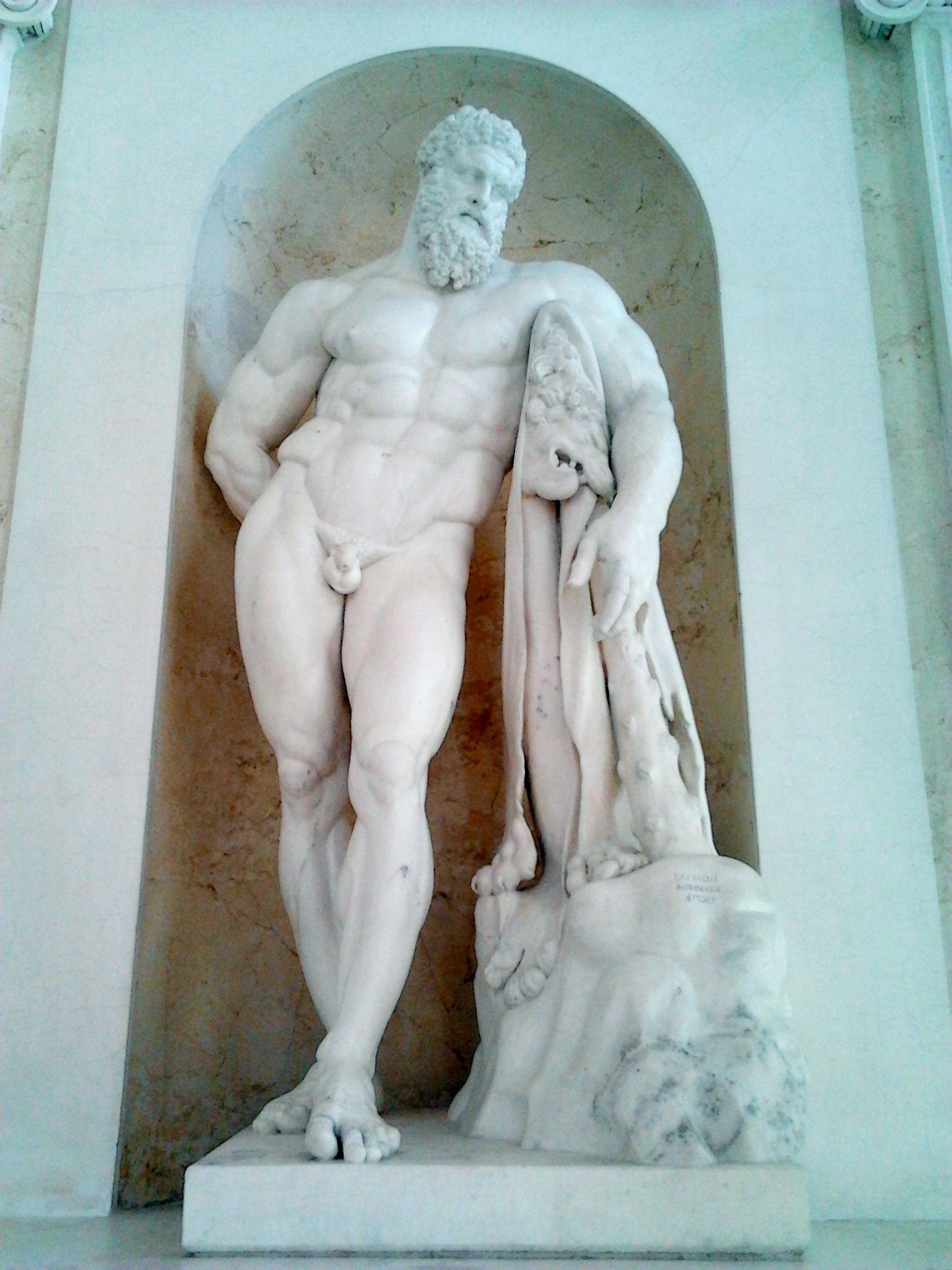
Angelini's version of the Farnese Hercules, circa 1792

Giuseppe Angelini (1735–1811) was an Italian sculptor active in Rome. His notable works include the tomb of Giambattista Piranesi in the church of Sta. Maria del Priorato, as well as a wax model from a funeral urn in the Capitoline Museums produced for Josiah Wedgwood.

== Biography ==
He attended artistic studies at the studio of the painter Niccolò Ricciolini and the sculptor Bartolomeo Cavaceppi and in 1770 he moved to England where, in 1775, he exhibited at the Society of Artists a sculptural group representing Chastity driving away profane Love. However, he did not enjoy particular success and in 1778 he returned to Italy where he worked in Rome and Naples. He also dedicated himself to the restoration and copying of ancient sculptures.
