= Laura Piranesi =

Italian artist (1754–1789)

Laura Gertrude Piranesi
- Born: 1754; Rome
- Died: 1790 (aged 35–36); Rome
- Known for: Etching
- Movement: Neoclassicism, Romanticism
- Spouse: Giuseppe Svezzeman

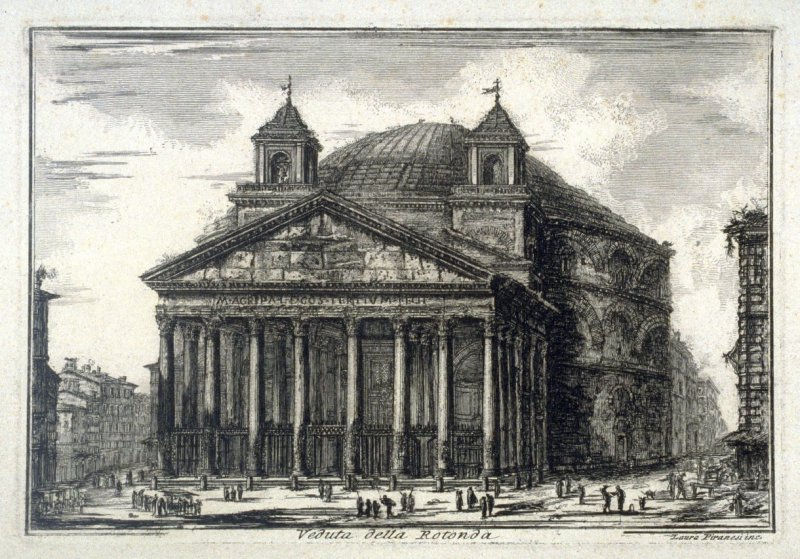
Veduta della Rotonda (the Pantheon, Rome), Laura Piranesi

Laura Piranesi (1754–1790) was an Italian etcher working in Rome towards the end of the 18th century. She was an active participant in her family's print workshop, run by her father Giovanni Battista Piranesi, an Italian artist, etcher, and antiquarian. Participating in the veduta genre, Piranesi's prints consist of stylized views of Roman architecture and ruins that aim to capture the spirit of the city through landscapes. Vedute and architectural prints were particularly popular among travelers participating in the Grand Tour, and as Piranesi lived and worked during the height of the Grand Tour, her prints catered to the souvenir market. Her use of chiaroscuro and free-flowing lines reflect the rising popularity of Romanticism, which prioritizes emotion over accuracy.

Her etchings are normally a good deal smaller than those of her father, at around 200 by 140 mm.

Her life and career has long been overshadowed by her father, Giovanni Battista Piranesi, and brother, Francesco Piranesi.

== Biography ==
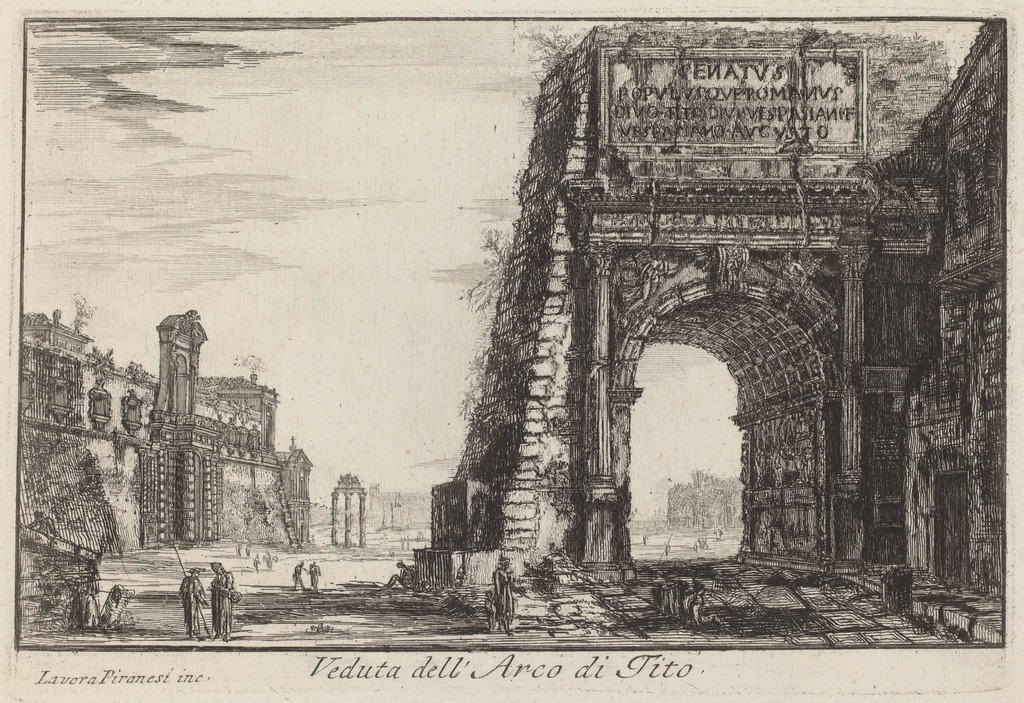
Arch of Titus, c. 1780

Laura Piranesi was born in Rome in 1754, the eldest child of Giovanni Battista Piranesi and his wife, Angela Pasquini. She had four younger siblings: Francesco Piranesi (1758/59–1810), Angelo Piranesi (1763–1782), Anna Maria Rosalia Piranesi (b. 1766–?), and Pietro Piranesi (1773–?). Piranesi and her brothers were trained by their father in the family craft of etching; it is unknown whether her sister Anna Maria, who entered the Bambin-Gesù on Via Urbana in 1783, was trained in etching. Well-educated, Piranesi could write in Latin.

On November 9, 1778, her father died, sending his family into legal and financial turmoil. Though Piranesi was the eldest child, inheritance laws in 18th-century Rome dictated that the workshop was to be inherited by the next male heir, Francesco. Not only was the workshop in Francesco's hands, but Piranesi and her youngest siblings were under his guardianship as well; within three days of Giovanni Battista's death, Francesco drew up an initial dowry contract for Piranesi's betrothal to carpenter Giuseppe Svezzeman. In May 1779, a final contract was agreed upon and her dowry was used by Svezzeman to open three financially unsuccessful shops in Rome.

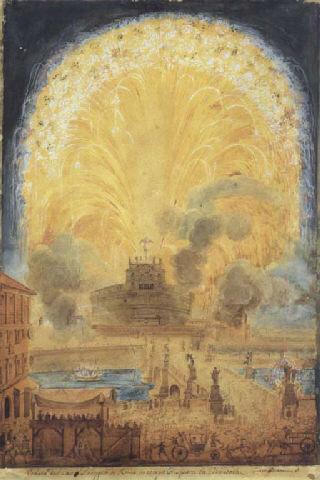
La girandola a Castel Sant' Angelo (Fireworks over the Castel Sant' Angelo, watercolour and pencil)

In 1780, Piranesi and Giuseppe had a daughter, Luisa Clara Maria Gertrude Fortunata Svezzeman. Over the next decade, debt and ill-health followed the family, involving the couple in numerous court trials.

Piranesi is now known to have been alive in 1789, though scholarship previously thought her to have died by 1785. She was certainly dead by 1799, when the remaining Piranesi family members fled to Paris following the collapse of the Roman Republic.

== Career and reception ==
In an era when it was rare for a woman to produce art professionally, Piranesi is a rare example of a female artist creating for a specific and viable market. In addition, Piranesi played a role in managing the family workshop – written sales records and inventories of her father's prints exist in Piranesi's hand, helping modern scholars to date his prints.

Piranesi's prints are undated, making it uncertain when she produced her prints, and whether she produced them before or after her father's death. However, it is known that some of her prints were created after her father's death, but on a lesser scale. Two prints that fall into this category are the View of the Basilica de Santa Maria Maggiore and the View of San Giovanni Laterano.

Labelled her work as copies, art historians from the 18th century to today have overlooked the unique aspects of Piranesi's work, as nearly all are reinterpretations of her father's etchings. In the 1920s, the Keeper of Prints and Drawings at the British Museum, Arthur Mayger Hind took an interest in Piranesi's prints when the museum acquired 20 prints by her. Hind recognized a liberty of design and unique style in Piranesi's prints. Due to their delicate nature, many of Piranesi's prints have been lost, damaged, or destroyed.

== Notable collections ==
- Veduta del Tempio di Antonino, oggi Dogana di Terra (View of the Temple of Antoninus, now the Land Customs Office), 19th century, Fine Arts Museums of San Francisco
- Vedute di Roma, 1750–1785, British Museum. A collection 20 prints.

== Recent exhibits ==
- 2023–2024: Laura Piranesi is featured in the exhibit "Making Her Mark: A History of Women Artists in Europe, 1400–1800" at the Baltimore Museum of Art.

== Gallery ==
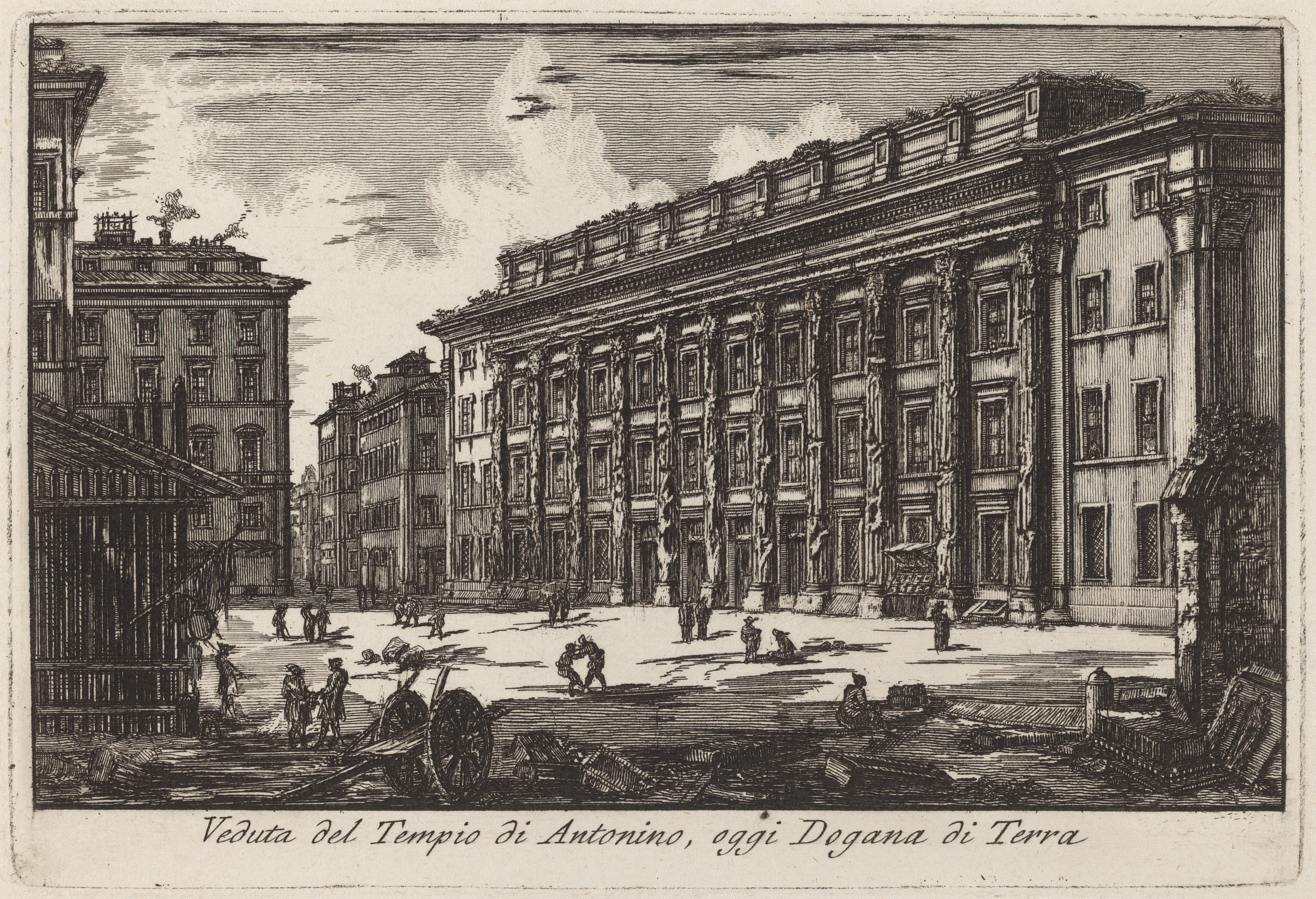
Veduta del Tempio di Antonino, oggi Dogana di Terra (View of the Temple of Antoninus, now the Land Customs Office in Rome), the Hadrianeum, a reduced copy of her father's view

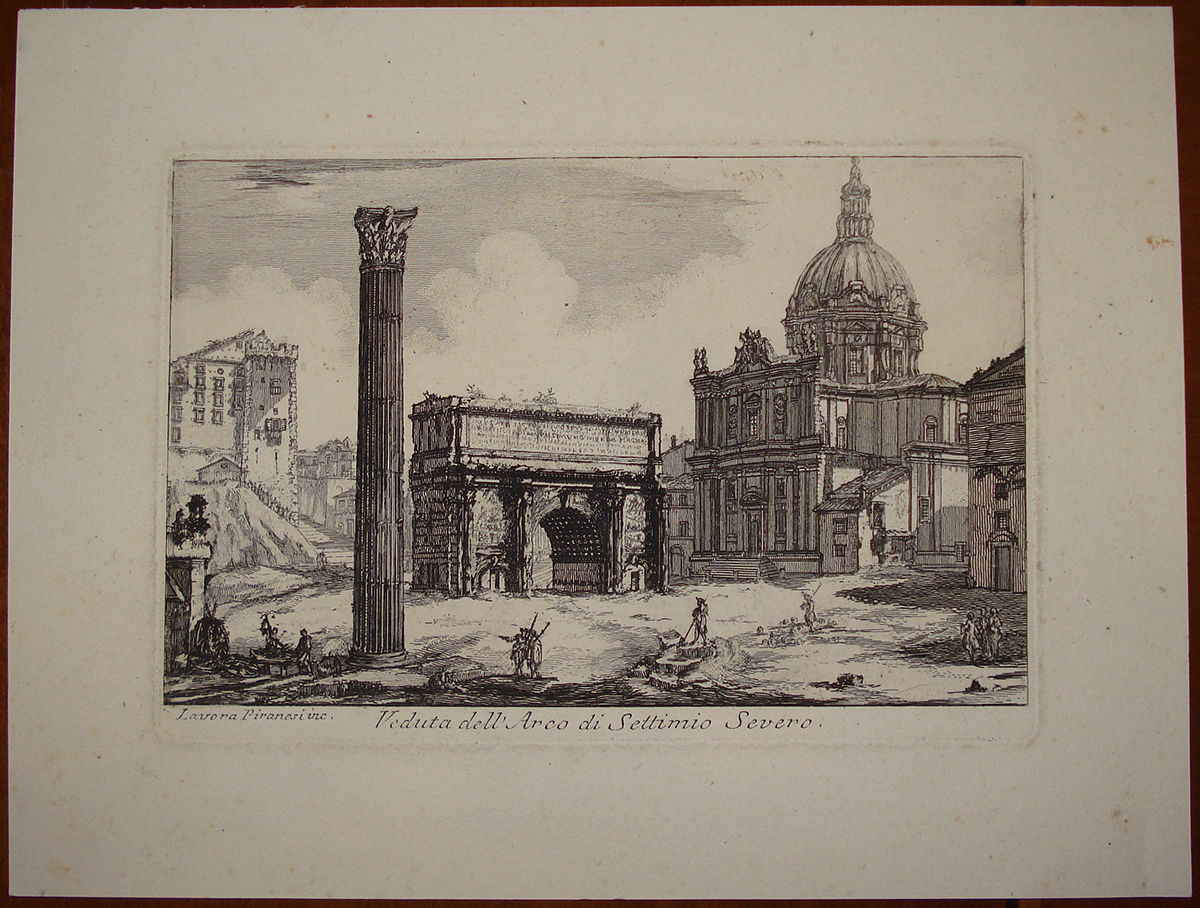
Veduta dell'Arco di Settimio Severo, Laura Piranesi

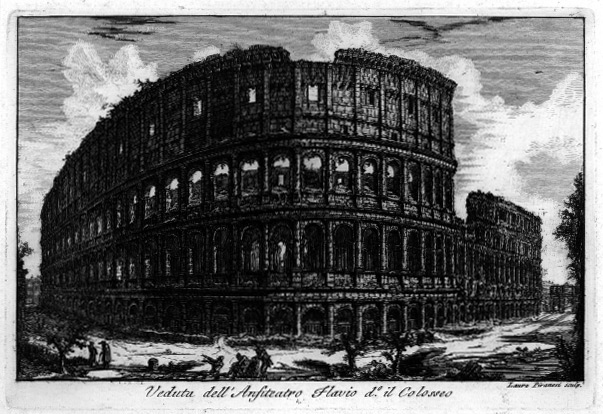
Veduta dell'anfiteatro flavio detto il colosseo, Laura Piranesi.
