= Giovanni Battista Piranesi =

Italian architect and artist (1720–1778)

Piranesi
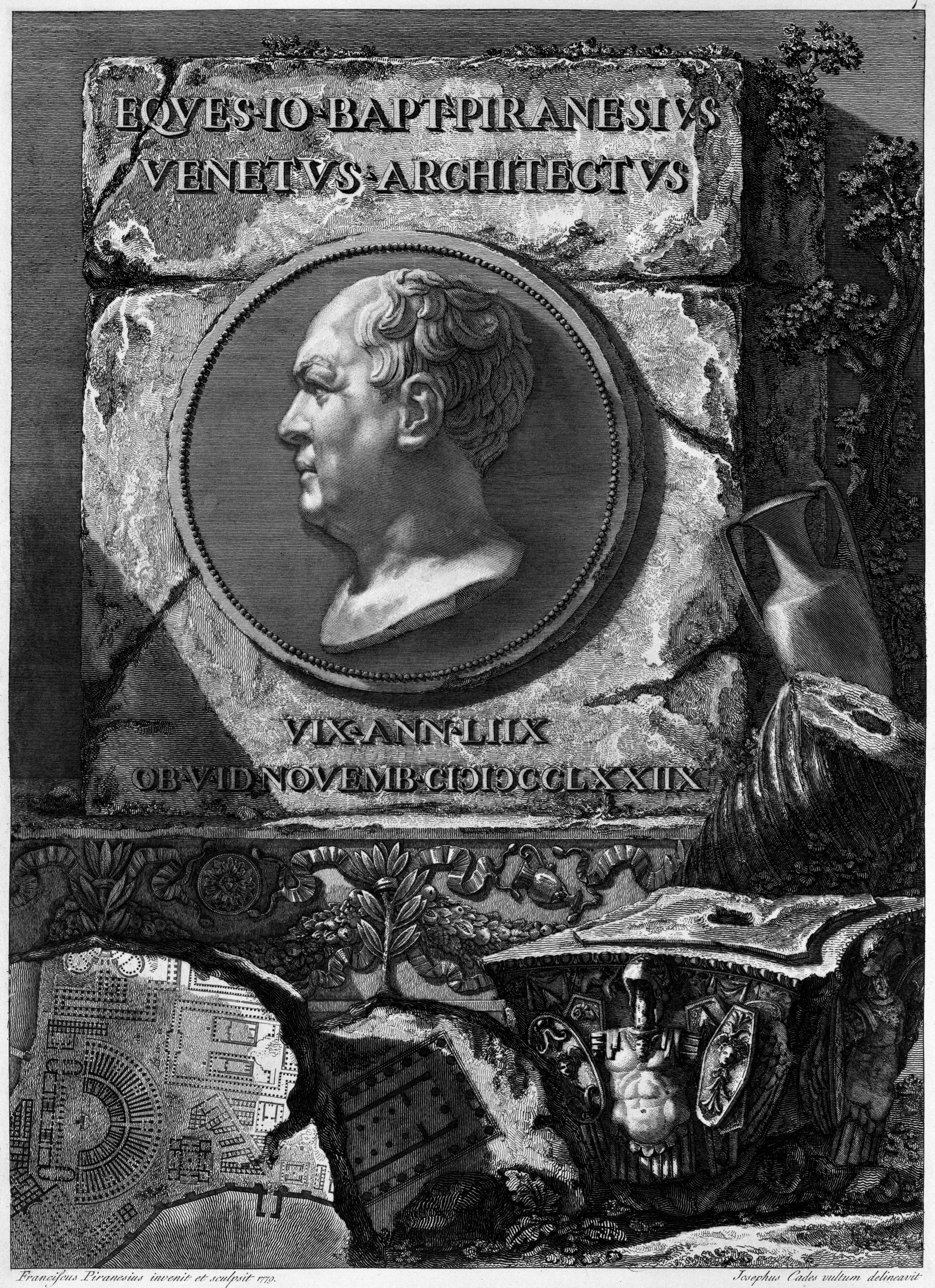
- Portrait by Francesco Piranesi, 1779
- Born: 4 October 1720; Venice, Republic of Venice
- Died: 9 November 1778 (aged 58); Rome, Papal States
- Education: Matteo Lucchesi
- Known for: Etching
- Notable work: Le Carceri d'Invenzione and etchings of Rome
- Movement: Neoclassicism

Giovanni Battista (or Giambattista) Piranesi (Italian pronunciation: [dʒoˈvanni batˈtista piraˈneːzi; -eːsi]; also known as simply Piranesi; 4 October 1720 – 9 November 1778) was an Italian classical archaeologist, architect, and artist, famous for his etchings of Rome and of fictitious and atmospheric "prisons" (Carceri d'invenzione). He was the father of Francesco Piranesi, Laura Piranesi and Pietro Piranesi.

== Biography ==
Piranesi was born in Venice, in the parish of San Moisè, where he was baptised. His father was a stonemason. His brother Andrea introduced him to Latin literature and ancient Greco-Roman civilization, and later he was apprenticed under his uncle, Matteo Lucchesi, who was a leading architect in the Magistrato alle Acque, the state organization responsible for engineering and restoring historical buildings.

From 1740, he had an opportunity to work in Rome as a draughtsman for Marco Foscarini, the Venetian ambassador (and future Doge of Venice) to the new Pope Benedict XIV. He resided in the Palazzo Venezia and studied under Giuseppe Vasi, who introduced him to the art of etching and engraving of the city and its monuments. Giuseppe Vasi found Piranesi's talent was much greater than that of a mere engraver. According to Legrand, Vasi told Piranesi that "you are too much of a painter, my friend, to be an engraver."

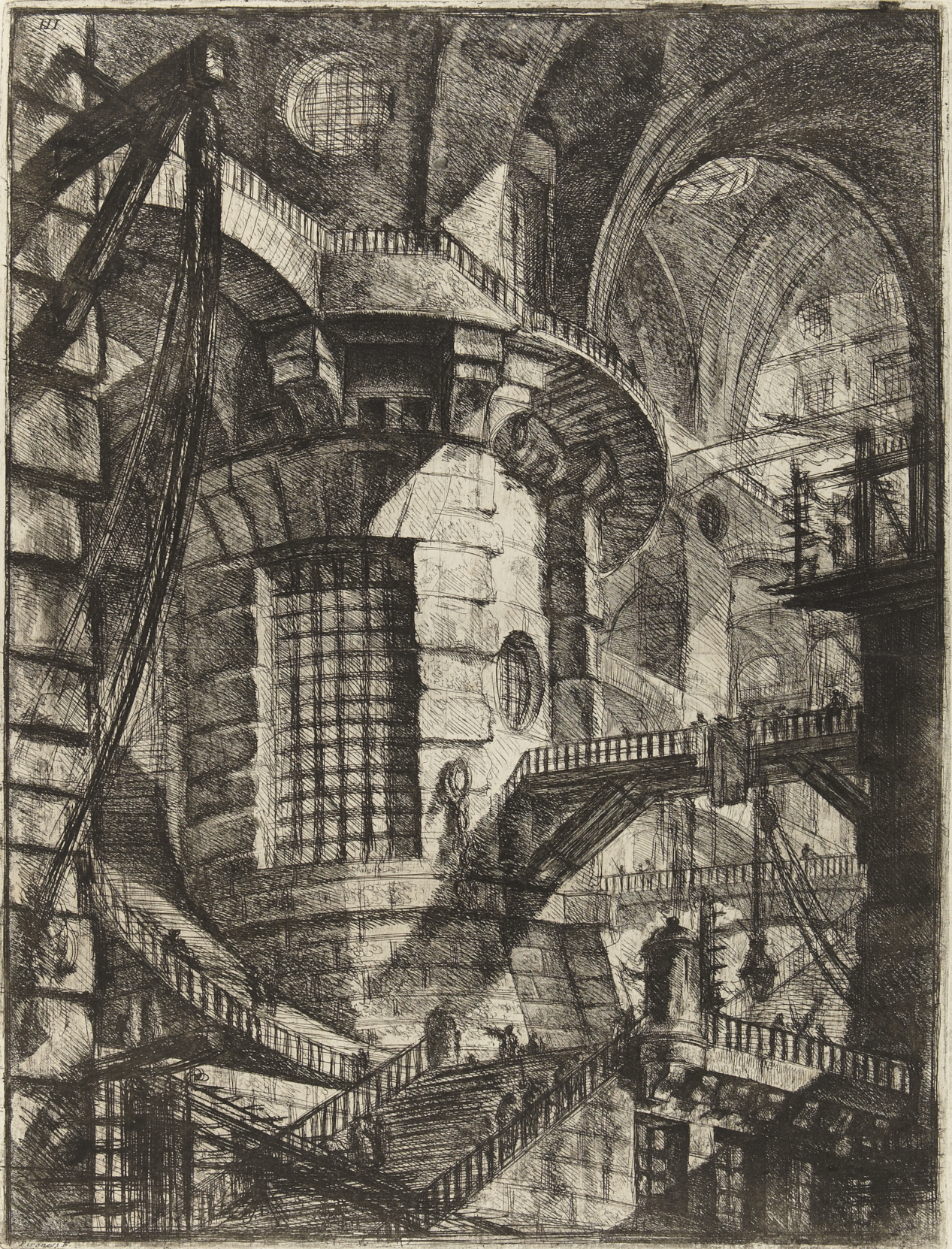
The Round Tower, etching

After his studies with Vasi, he collaborated with pupils of the French Academy in Rome to produce a series of vedute (views) of the city; his first work was Prima parte di Architettura e Prospettive (1743), followed in 1745 by Varie Vedute di Roma Antica e Moderna.

In 1752 Piranesi married Angela Pasquini, with their son Francesco born in 1758/1759.

From 1743 to 1747, he was mainly in Venice where, according to some sources, he often visited Giovanni Battista Tiepolo, a leading artist in Venice. It was Tiepolo who expanded the restrictive conventions of reproductive, topographical and antiquarian engravings. He then returned to Rome, where he opened a workshop in Via del Corso. In 1748–1774, he created an important series of vedute of the city which established his fame. In the meantime Piranesi devoted himself to the measurement of many of the ancient buildings: this led to the publication of Le Antichità Romane de' tempo della prima Repubblica e dei primi imperatori ("Roman Antiquities of the Time of the First Republic and the First Emperors"). In 1761, he became a member of the Accademia di San Luca and opened a printing house of his own. In 1762, the Campo Marzio dell'antica Roma collection of engravings was printed.

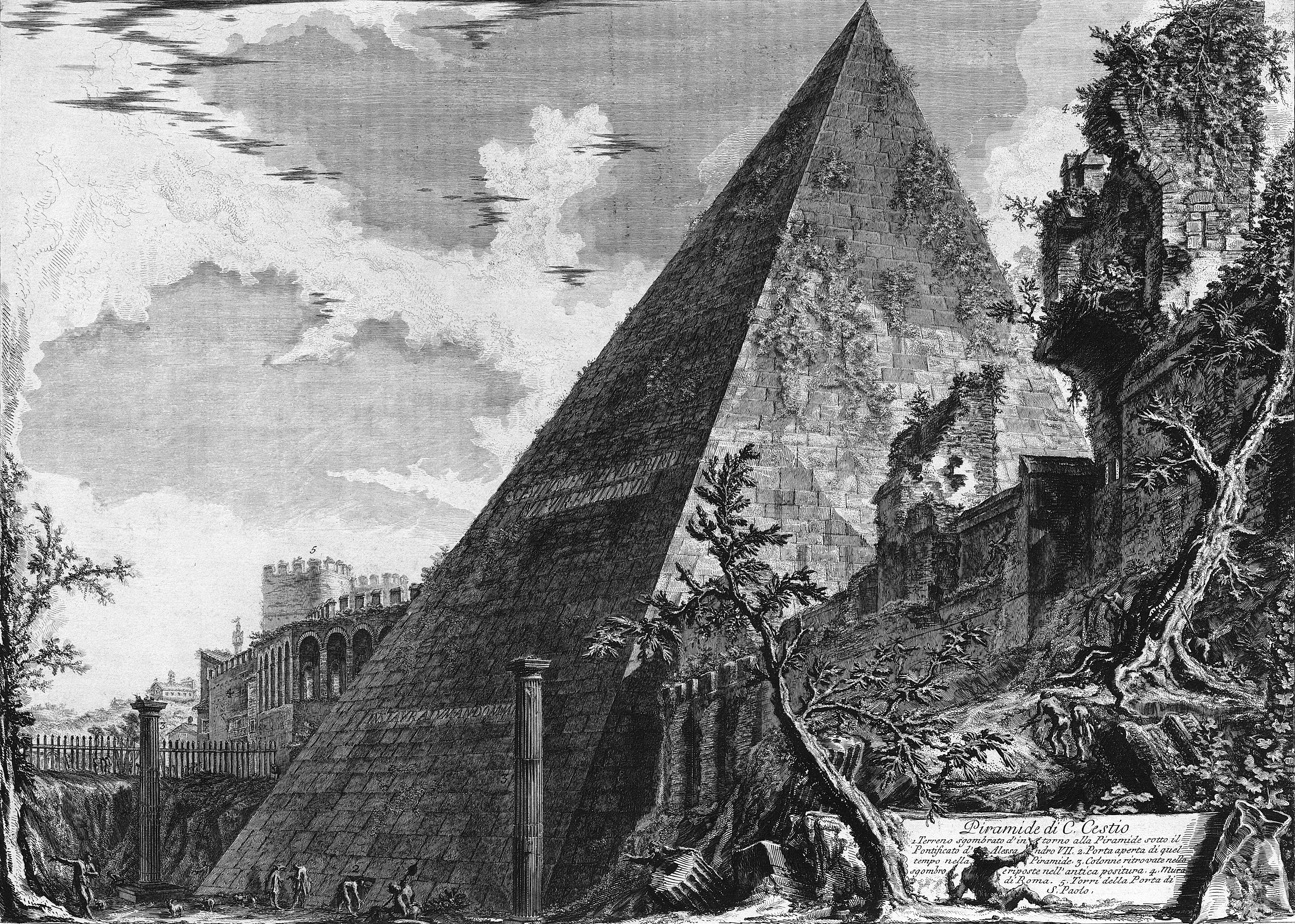
The Pyramid of Cestius, etching

The following year he was commissioned by Pope Clement XIII to restore the choir of San Giovanni in Laterano, but the work did not materialize. In 1764, one of the Pope's nephews, Cardinal Rezzonico, appointed him to start his only architectural work, the restoration of the church of Santa Maria del Priorato in the Villa of the Knights of Malta, on Rome's Aventine Hill. He combined Classical architectural elements, trophies and escutcheons with his own particular imaginative genius for the design of the facade of the church and the walls of the adjacent Piazza dei Cavalieri di Malta.

In 1767, he was made a knight of the Golden Spur, which enabled him to sign himself "Cav[aliere] Piranesi". In 1769, his publication of a series of ingenious and sometimes bizarre designs for chimneypieces, as well as an original range of furniture pieces, established his place as a versatile and resourceful designer. In 1776, he created his best known work as a 'restorer' of ancient sculpture, the Piranesi Vase, and in 1777–78 he published Avanzi degli Edifici di Pesto (Remains of the Edifices of Paestum).

He died in Rome in 1778 after a long illness, and was buried in the church he had helped restore, Santa Maria del Priorato. His tomb was designed by Giuseppe Angelini.

== The Views (Vedute) ==
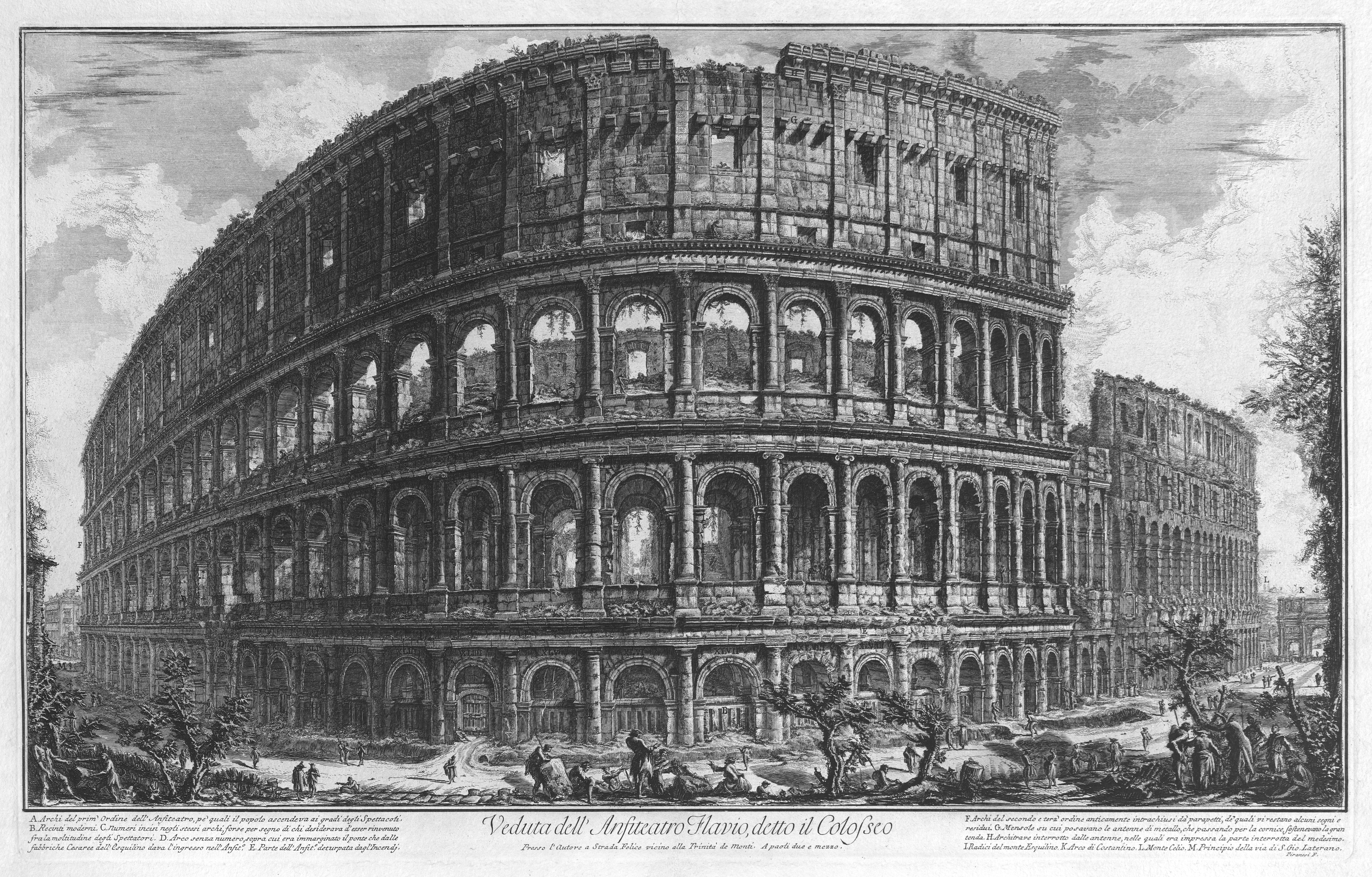
The Colosseum, etching, 1757

Even though the social structure by an aristocracy remained rigid and oppressive, Venice revived through the Grand Tour as the center of intellectual and international exchange in the eighteenth century. The ideas of the Enlightenment stimulated theorists and artists all over Europe including Paris, Dresden, and London. New forms of artistic expression emerged: veduta, capriccio, and veduta ideata, topographical view, architectural fantasy, accurate renderings of ancient monuments assembled with imaginary compositions in response to the demand of increased visitors.

The developing center of the Grand Tour was Rome. Rome became a new meeting place and intellectual capital of Europe for the leaders of a new movement in the arts. The city was attracting artists and architects from all over Europe beside the Grand Tourists, dealers and antiquarians. While many came through official institutions such as the French Academy in Rome, others came to see the new discoveries at Herculaneum and Pompeii. Coffee shops were frequent gathering places, most famously the Antico Caffè Greco, established 1760. The Caffe degli Inglesi opened several years later, at the foot of the Spanish Steps in Piazza di Spagna, with wall paintings by Piranesi. With his own print workshop and museum of antiquities nearby, Piranesi was able to cultivate relationships in both places with wealthy buyers on the tour, particularly English.

The remains of Rome kindled Piranesi's enthusiasm. Informed by his experience in Venice and his study of the works of Marco Ricci and particularly Giovanni Paolo Panini, he appreciated not only the engineering of the ancient buildings but also the poetic aspects of the ruins. He was able to faithfully imitate the actual remains; his invention in catching the design of the original Roman architect provided the missing parts. His masterful skill at engraving introduced groups of vases, altars, tombs that were absent in reality; his manipulations of scale; and his broad and scientific distribution of light and shade completed the picture, creating a striking effect from the whole view.

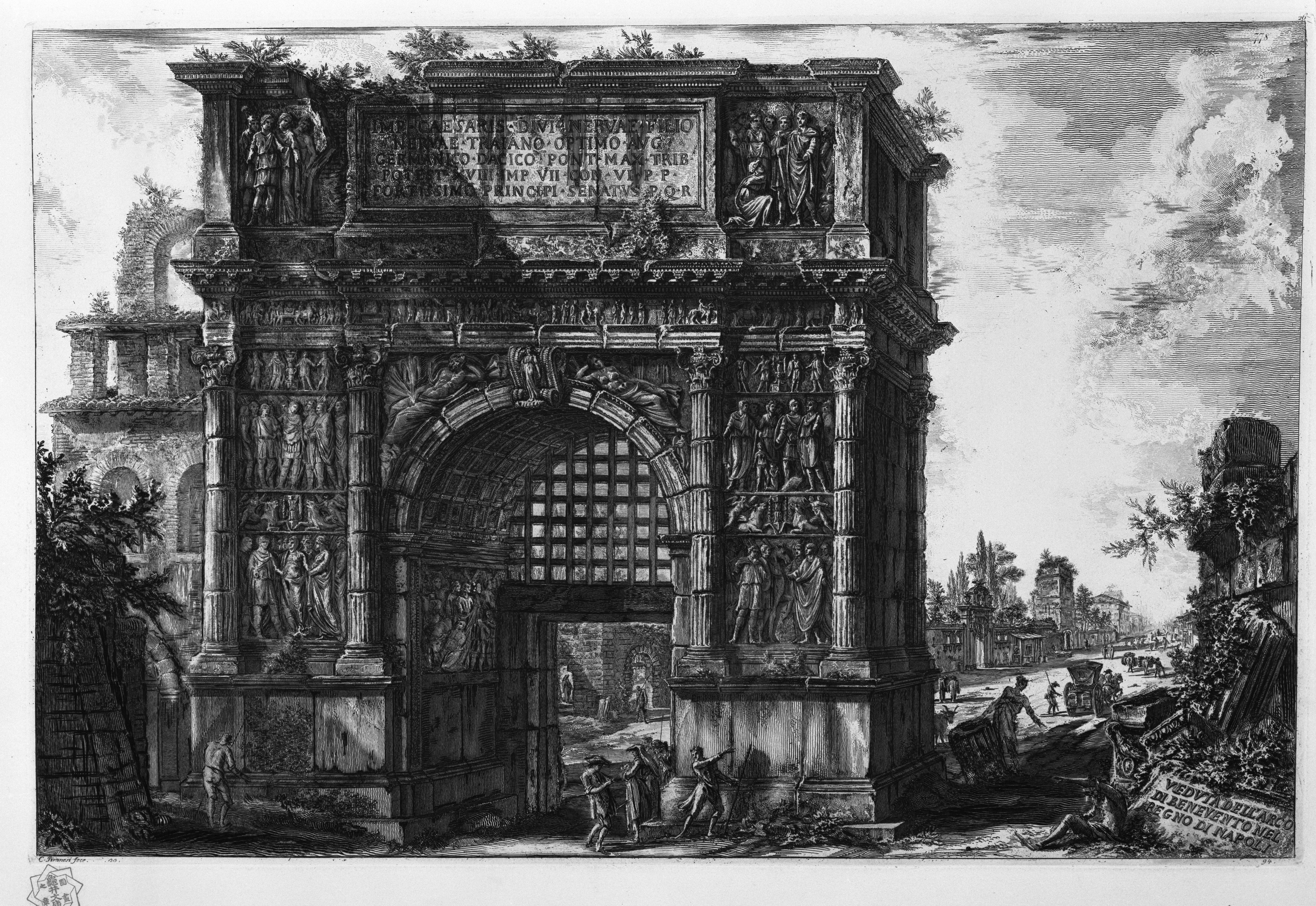
The Arch of Trajan at Benevento, etching

A number of the Views are notable for depicting human figures whose poverty, lameness, apparent drunkenness, and other visible flaws appear to echo the decay of the ruins. This is consistent with a familiar trope of Renaissance literature, in which the ruins of Rome are lamented as a metaphor for the imperfection and transience of human existence.

Some of his later work was completed by his children and several pupils. Piranesi's son and coadjutor, Francesco, collected and preserved his plates, in which the freer lines of the etching-needle largely supplemented the severity of burin work. Twenty-nine folio volumes containing about 2000 prints appeared in Paris (1835–1837).

The Arch of Septimius Severus is pictured with the Church of Santi Luca e Martina and the Column of Phocas, all situated in the Roman Forum.

The late Baroque works of Claude Lorrain, Salvator Rosa, and others had featured romantic and fantastic depictions of ruins; in part as a memento mori or as a reminiscence of a golden age of construction. Piranesi also made copies of a number of etchings by Israel Silvestre, whose works he apparently admired. Piranesi's reproductions of real and recreated Roman ruins were a strong influence on Neoclassicism.

One of the main features of Neo-Classicism is the attitude towards nature and the uses of the past. Neo-Classicism was prompted by the discoveries at Herculaneum and Pompeii. Rediscovery and revaluation of the art and architecture of Greece, Egypt, and Gothic continued throughout the century. The view of a Golden Age was changing from static to mutable, inspired by Rousseau and Winckelmann in response to the dynamic growth of society.

The wider perspective on the past created a new way of expression. Artists developed a greater self-consciousness in confronting the limited authority of the ancient world, and there was a growing interest in civilizations and the destiny of nations. Piranesi was especially interested in the Graeco-Roman debate in the 1760s, between followers of Winckelmann who thought Greek culture and architecture superior to their Roman counterparts, and those who (like Piranesi) believed that the Romans had improved upon their Greek models. His free relationship to the past may be summarized in a phrase of his that become a mantra: "col sporcar si trova"; "by messing about, one discovers".

Throughout his lifetime, Piranesi created numerous prints depicting the Eternal City; these were widely collected by gentlemen on the Grand Tour. The Lobkowicz Collections, housed at the Lobkowicz Palace in Prague, contains a group of twenty-six of his engravings.

== The Prisons (Carceri) ==
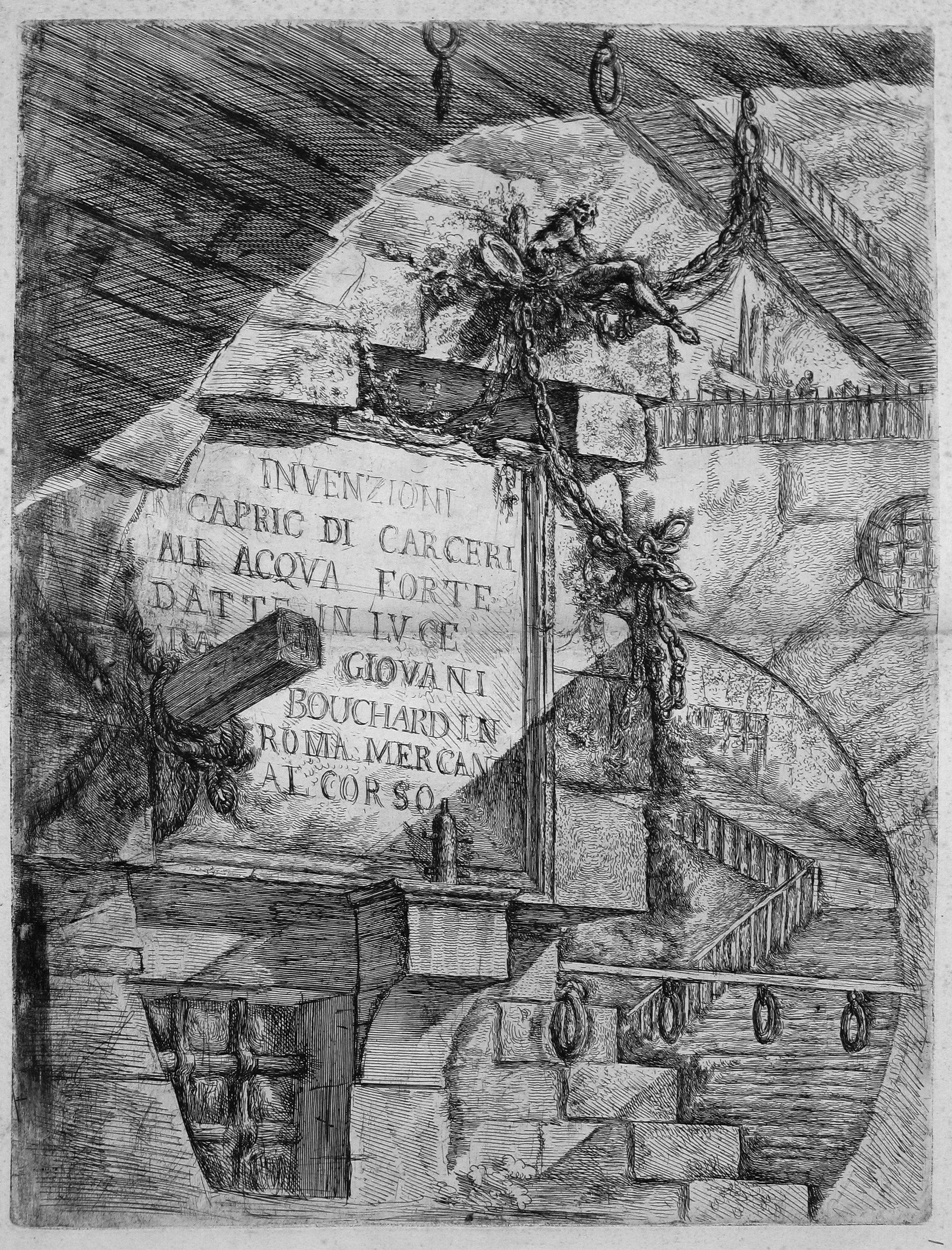
First plate in the first edition of Le Carceri d'Invenzione

The Prisons (Carceri d'invenzione or "Imaginary Prisons"), is a series of 16 prints produced in first and second states that show enormous subterranean vaults with stairs and mighty machines. The series was started in 1745. The first state prints were published in 1750 and consisted of 14 etchings, untitled and unnumbered, with a sketch-like look. The original prints were 16" x 21". For the second publishing in 1761, all the etchings were reworked and numbered I–XVI (1–16). Numbers II and V were new etchings to the series. Numbers I to IX were all done in portrait format (vertical), while X to XVI were landscape format (horizontal+).

In the second publishing, some of the illustrations appear to have been edited to contain (likely deliberate) impossible geometries.

== Archaeologist ==
It is important to look at his contribution as an archaeologist, which was acknowledged at the time as he had been elected to the Society of Antiquaries of London. His influence of technical drawings in antiquarian publications is often overshadowed. He left explanatory notes in the lower margin about the structure and ornament. Most ancient monuments in Rome were abandoned in fields and gardens. Piranesi tried to preserve them with his engravings. To do this, Piranesi pushed himself to achieve realism in his work. A third of the monuments in Piranesi's engravings have disappeared, and the stucco and surfacings were often stolen, or restored and modified clumsily. Piranesi's precise observational skills allow people to experience the atmosphere in Rome in the eighteenth century. Piranesi may have recognised his role of disseminating remarkable information through meaningful images. He became the Director of the Portici Museum in 1751.

== Contemporary references ==
- The International Piranesi Award for architecture, awarded annually since 1989.
- The Franco-Belgian comic La Tour features designs based on Piranesi's Imaginary Prisons and a main character called "Giovanni Battista" after Piranesi.
- The titular character in Susanna Clarke's novel Piranesi (2020), who lives in an unimaginably vast, labyrinthine house.
- Piranesi is the name of a mutable, inscrutable prison surrounded by statues of impossible geometry, featured in the Sunless Skies video game.
- In the video game Ixion, the Piranesi is a vessel belonging to a group called the "Black Market Society" and is hostile to the player.
- The name of ambient drone music project, Piranesi.
