= Istituto Nazionale per la Grafica =

Coordinates: 41.9011°N 12.4831°E

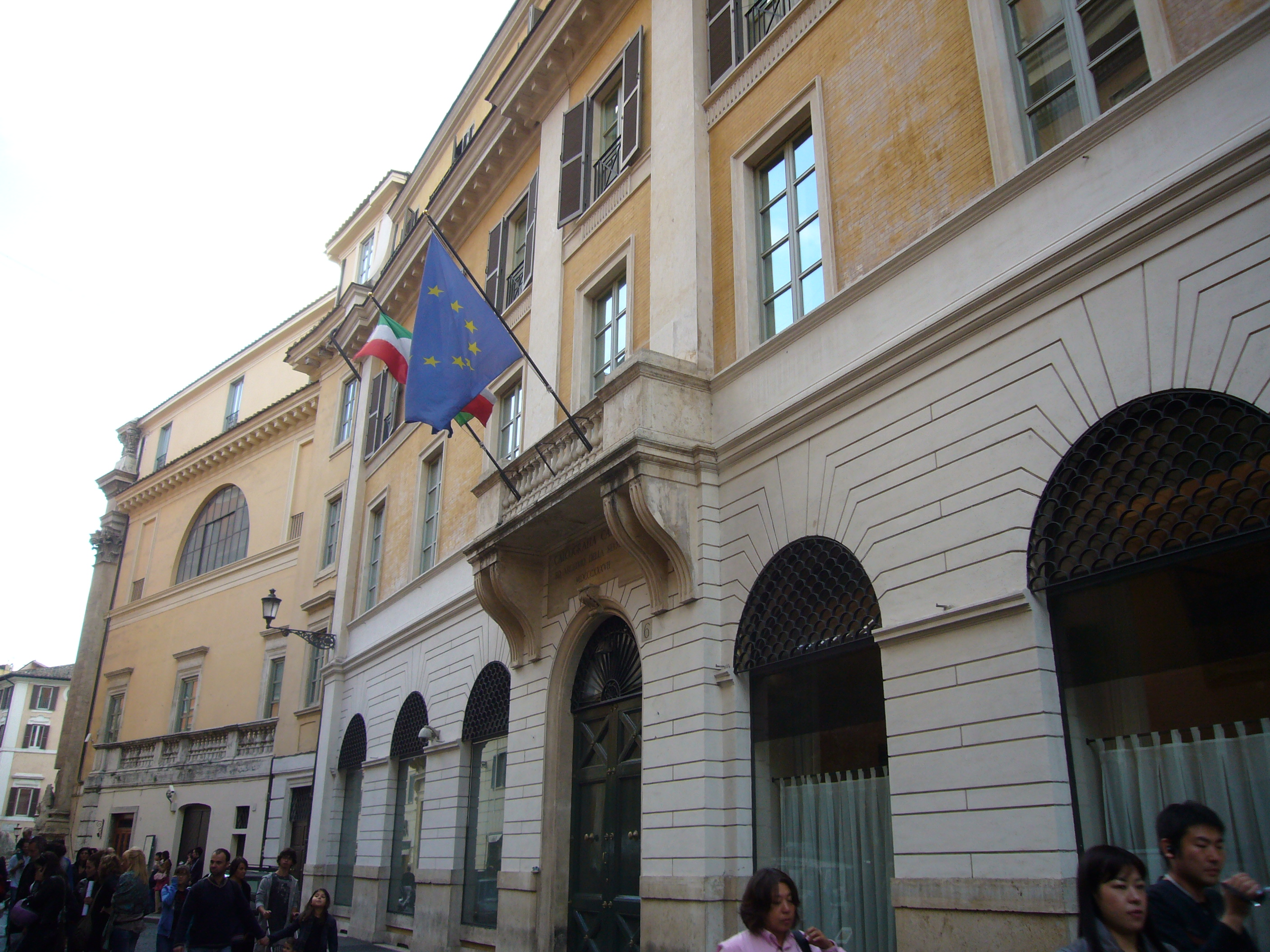
- Established: 1975
- Location: Palazzo Poli and Palazzo della Calcografia, Rome
- Director: Maria Antonella Fusco
- Website: www.grafica.beniculturali.it

The Istituto Nazionale per la Grafica (National Institute for the Graphic Design) is an Italian institute having the aim of preserving, protecting and promote a heritage of works providing documentary evidence of all types of graphic design: prints, drawings, photographs. The institute is located in Rome and is managed by the Directorate-General for Contemporary Landscape, Arts and Architecture of the Italian Ministry of Cultural Heritage and Activities.

The institute is housed in the monumental complex of Trevi Fountain, consisting of Palazzo Poli and neighbouring Palazzo della Calcografia, built in 1837 by architect Giuseppe Valadier as headquarters of the Chamber Intaglio, directed by Valadier himself for decades. The historic Palazzo Poli was purchased in 1978 by the Italian State, with the very purpose of unifying the National Intaglio and the National Cabinet of Prints, which in 1975 were merged into the present institute.

== Gallery ==
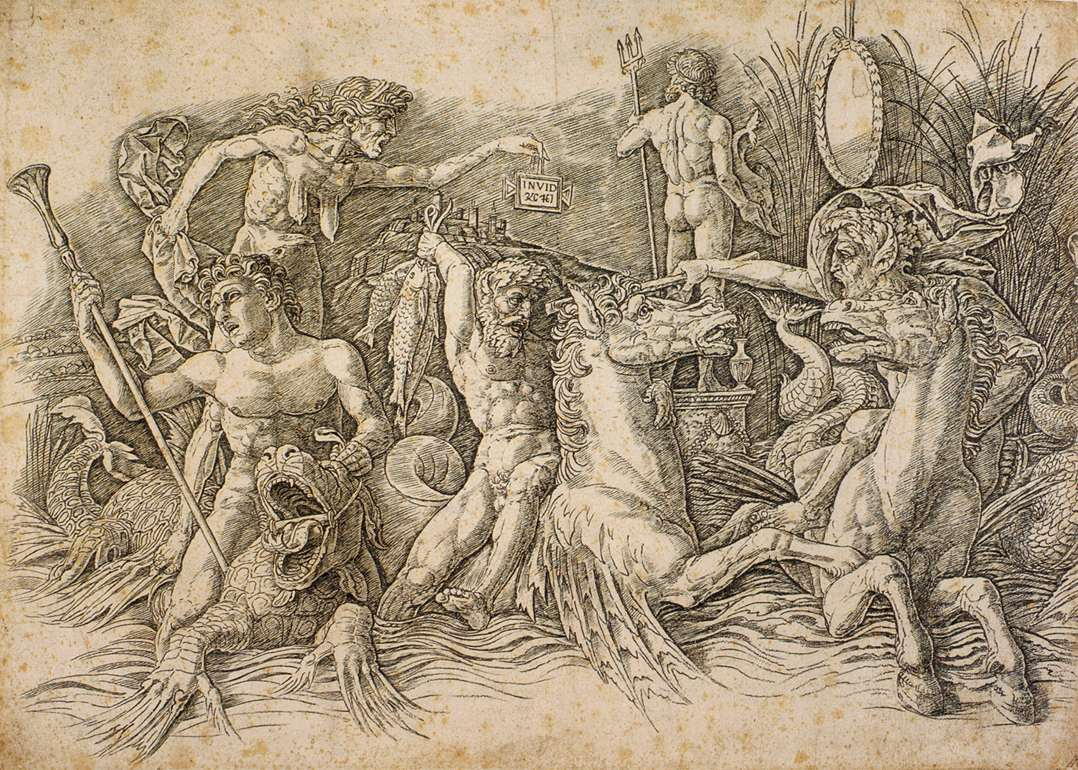
Andrea Mantegna, Battle of two sea monsters

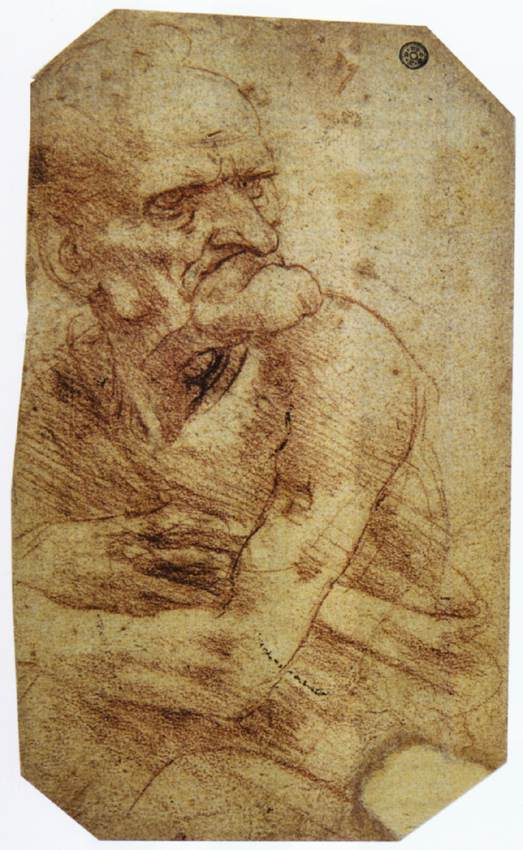
Leonardo da Vinci, Study of an old man

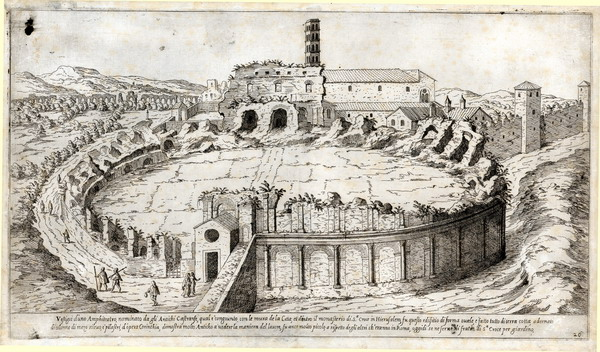
Étienne Dupérac, Anfiteatro Castrense

== Bibliography ==
- Paola Staccioli, Istituto Nazionale per la Grafica in I musei nascosti di Roma Alla scoperta dei tesori dimenticati della città Collana Roma Tascabile, pages 45–46, Newton Compton, Rome, ISBN 88-8183-417-0
